= List of programmes broadcast by Kana TV =

Kana TV is an Ethiopian satellite television channel that airs television dramas and local programmes. Launched in 2016, Kana TV is known for broadcasting Turkish television series, which gained significant marketing share. Programs are dubbed in the Amharic language, and Kana TV developed locally produced shows such as #Time, Weraj Ale, Kana News and Sheqela. In addition, Kana TV began connecting to international Ethiopian audiences overseas through YouTube, gaining popular attraction to series such as Üç Kız Kardeş (Yewef Gojo) on YouTube.

== Local content ==
- #Time – a locally produced entertainment show featuring the latest music and popular trends. Hosted by presenter Danayit Mekbebe.
- Weraj Ale – a local production talk show that present informative amongst lifestyle and workplace
- Kana News – A locally produced short daily news segment airing weekdays during commercial breaks in regular programming.
- #Sheqela – a local produced entertainment featuring types of strategies of the future life and trends.

== Dubbed content ==
=== Foreign dramas/shows ===
- Saraswatichandra (TV series) / ዛራና ቻንድራ "Zara Ena Chandra" – Broadcast from April 4, 2016 – January 10, 2017
- Fugitivos / ወጥመድ "Wetmed" – Broadcast from April 4, 2016 – January 10, 2017
- Kara Para Aşk / ጥቁር ፍቅር "Tikur Fikir" – Broadcast from April 4, 2016 – November 16, 2016
- Salve Jorge / የውበት እስረኞች "Yewubet Esregnoch" – Broadcast from April 4, 2016 – November 16, 2016
- Le tre rose di Eva (TV series) / የጠፋ ስም "Yetefa Sim" – Broadcast from April 4, 2016 – January 10, 2017
- Bogosipda / ፍለጋ "Flega" – Broadcast from April 4, 2016 – January 10, 2017
- Squadra antimafia – Palermo oggi / የንስር ዐይን "Ye Neser Ayen" – Broadcast from April 4,2016 – July 10, 2017
- La ronca de oro / መረዋ "Merewa" – Broadcast from April 4, 2016 – January 10, 2017
- Kuzey Güney / ኩዚ ጉኒ "Kuzi Guni" – Broadcast from May 30, 2016 – February 14, 2017
- Fatmagül'ün Suçu Ne? / ቅጣት "Kitat" – Broadcast from November 17, 2016 – July 3, 2017
- O'Hayati Benim / የተቀማ ሕይወት "Yetekema Hiwot" – Broadcast from February 15, 2017 – May 30, 2019
- Paramparça / ሽንቁር ልቦች "Shinkur Liboch" – Broadcast from July 4, 2017 – June 17, 2018
- Pasión y poder / የራስ ምርኮኛ "Yeras Mirkogna" – Broadcast from February 14, 2017 – August 4, 2017
- Adini Feriha Koydum / ፈሪሀ "Feriha" – Broadcast from February 7, 2018 – August 27, 2018
- Cesur ve Güzel / ፍቅር ከበቀል "Fikir kbekel" – Broadcast from August 6, 2017 – February 12, 2018
- Avenida Brasil / የበቀል መንገድ "Yebekel Menged" – Broadcast from August 6, 2017 – February 12, 2018
- Dicte / ያልተንኳኩ በሮች "Yaltenkwaku Beroch" – Broadcast from August 6, 2017 – February 12, 2018
- İçerde / ምሥጢር "Mistir" – Broadcast from October 13, 2018 – February 22, 2019
- Bir Aşk Hikayesi / የፍቅር ነገር "Ye'fekir Neger" – Broadcast from January 10, 2018 – April 18, 2018
- Sol Nascente / መድረሻ "Medresha" – Broadcast from April 20, 2018 – September 16, 2018
- Kaçak / ታዳኙ "Tadagnu" – Broadcast from September 16, 2018 – January 22, 201
- Kadın / ያልተፈታ ሕልም "Yaltefeta Hilm" - Broadcast from February 23, 2019 – October 4, 2020
- Karadayı / ፍርደኞቹ "Firdegnochu" – Broadcast from May 8, 2019 – March 3, 2021
- Aşk-ı Memnu / የተከለከለ "Yetekelekele" – Broadcast from October 5, 2020 – March 31, 2021
- Zalim İstanbul / ሽሚያ "Shimya" – Broadcast from April 5, 2021 – October 8, 2021
- Siyah Beyaz Aşk / ድርና ማግ "Dir Ena Mag" – Broadcast from July 28, 2021 – December 23, 2021
- Çukur / የኛ ሰፈር "Yegna Sefer" – Broadcast from August 10, 2019 – January 3, 2022
- The Queen and the Conqueror / ካታሊና "Katalina" – Broadcast from October 8, 2021 – January 23, 2022
- Cennet'in Gözyaşları / ያልታበሰ እንባ "Yaltabese Emba" – Broadcast from October 12, 2021 – March 23, 2022
- Öyle Bir Geçer Zaman ki / ማዕበል "Maebel" – Broadcast from October 27, 2020 – May 23, 2022
- Doğduğun Ev Kaderindir / ስበት "Sibet" – Broadcast from January 4, 2022 – July 15, 2022
- Bu Şehir Arkandan Gelecek / መልህቅ "Melhik" – Broadcast from March 24, 2022 – August 4, 2022
- Órfãos da Terra / ፍልሰት "Filset" – Broadcast from July 22, 2022 – September 12, 2022
- Meryem / ዉሳኔ "Wusane" – Broadcast from August 25, 2022 – January 5, 2023
- Mrs. Fazilet and Her Daughters / የፋዚሌት ልጆች "Ye Fazilet Lijoich" – Broadcast from May 25, 2022 – January 20, 2023
- Şeref Meselesi / ሥም "Sim" – Broadcast from August 8, 2022 – January 30, 2023
- Family Secrets (2016 TV series) / የቤተሰብ ገበና "Yebeteseb Gebena" – Broadcast from December 12, 2022 – February 6, 2023
- Son Yaz / በዛ በበጋ "Beza Bebega" – Broadcast from January 16, 2023 – March 20, 2023
- Aziz / አዚዝ "Aziz" – Broadcast from January 7, 2023 – May 13, 2023
- Akrep / የሸረሪት ድር "Yeshererit Dir" – Broadcast from January 24, 2023 – May 29, 2023
- Güneşin Kızları / የፀሐይ ልጆች "Yetsehay Lijoch" – Broadcast from January 16, 2023 – Jun 22, 2023
- Küçük Ağa / ትንሹ ባላባት "Tinishu Balabat" – Broadcast from March 6, 2023 – Aug 25, 2023
- Vatanım Sensin / የቆሰለ ፍቅር "Yeqosele Fikir" – Broadcast from May 15, 2023 – January 11, 2024
- Güllerin Savaşı / የአበባዎች ፍልሚያ "Yeabeboch Filmya" – Broadcast from July 10, 2023 – February 28, 2024
- Merhamet / ምሕረት "Mihret" – Broadcast from September 6, 2023 – April 19, 2024
- Ramo (TV series)/ ራሞ "Ramo" – Broadcast from September 12, 2023 – March 13, 2024
- Sefirin Kızı / የበኩር ልጅ "Yebekur Lij" – Broadcast from January 26, 2024 – Sep 27, 2024
- Kızlarım İçin / ስብራት "Sibrat" – Broadcast from April 22, 2024 – July 24, 2024
- Baht Oyunu / እጣ ፈንታ "Eta Fenta" – Broadcast from May 27, 2024 – August 20, 2024
- Maviye Sürgün / ዳርቻ "Daricha" – Broadcast from July 25, 2024 – December 13, 2024
- Tuzak / ድር "Dir" – Broadcast from August 14, 2024 – February 25, 2025
- Yeougagsibyeol / ማረፊያ "Marefiya" – Broadcast from September 30, 2024 – October 30, 2024
- Kırık Hayatlar / ሥንኩል ሕይወት "Sinkul Hiwot" – Broadcast from November 13, 2024 – May 2, 2025
- Lebeoliji sagijojagdan / ምርኮኞች "· Mirkognoch " – Broadcast from December 13, 2024 – February 3, 2025
- Aldatmak / አንቀፅ "Anqets" – Broadcast from Mar 14, 2024 – May 29, 2025
- Arıza / አሪዛ "Ariza" – Broadcast from October 31, 2024 – June 7, 2025
- Anne (Turkish TV series) / እቴ እሜቴ "Ete Emete" – Broadcast from January 6, 2025 – August 7, 2025
- Veda Mektubu / ስንብት "Sinbet" – Broadcast from May 29, 2025 – September 17, 2025
- Cabo (TV series) / ሁለት ልብ "Hulet Lib" – Broadcast from August 8, 2025 – December 5, 2025
- Siyah Kalp / መንታ መንገድ "Menta Menged" – Broadcast from September 18, 2025 – February 13, 2026
- Sinú, río de pasiones / የምኞት ጥላ "Yemignot Tila" – Broadcast from December 8, 2025 – March 2, 2026
- Üç Kız Kardeş / የወፍ ጎጆ "Yewef Gojo" – Broadcast from February 4, 2025 – June 10, 2026
- Sakla Beni / መሐላ "Mehala" – Broadcast from February 16, 2026 – June 19, 2026
- Poyraz Karayel / ለልጄ "Lelije" – Broadcast from May 22, 2026
- Tatlı İntikam / ጣፋጭ በቀል "Tafach_Beqel" – Broadcast from June 11, 2026 – october 2,2026
- Toprak ile Fidan / እህል ውሃ "Ehel "Weha" - Broadcast from June 22, 2026
- Bodrum Masalı / መብረቅ "Mebreq" – Broadcast from october 5,2026

=== Others ===
- Kana Passport/National Geographic – a weekly documentary program covering such topics as geography, archaeology and natural sciences.

== Music ==
- Hop – offers back-to-back music from the region and around the world.
