= List of programs broadcast by TRT 1 =

This is a list of television programs formerly and currently broadcast by the cable television channel TRT 1 in Turkey.

== Current programming ==
The following is a list of original TRT 1 programs that are currently in production and are being broadcast on the channel.

=== Historical ===
- Diriliş: Ertuğrul (2014-2019)
- Payitaht: Abdülhamid (2017–2021)
- Alparslan: Büyük Selçuklu (2021-2023)
- Uyanış: Büyük Selçuklu (2020–2021)
- Bir Zamanlar Kıbrıs (2021–2022)
- Tozkoparan İskender (2021-2022)
- Kudüs Fatihi Selahaddin Eyyubi (2023-present)

=== Drama ===
- Masumlar Apartmanı (2020–present)
- Teşkilat (2021-present)

=== Comedy ===
- The Marvelous Misadventures of Flapjack (2010–present)
- Kral Şakir (2016–present)
- Seksenler (2012–2016; 2019–present)

=== Talk shows ===
- Pelin Çift İle Gündem Ötesi (2015–present)

=== Sports ===
- UEFA Champions League (2015–present)
- UEFA Europa League (2015–present)
- UEFA Super Cup (2015–present)

=== Reality/documentary ===
- Ana Ocağı (2014–present)

== Former programming ==
The following is a list of TRT 1 original programs that have appeared on the channel in the past.

=== Domestica ===
- 1970: Kaçaklar
- 1974: Yılkı Atı
- 1974: Sokak Şarkıcıları
- 1974: Ahududu
- 1974: Hartlineden Hititlere
- 1974: Kaynanalar
- 1975: Aşk-ı Memnu
- 1975: Diyet
- 1975: Ferman
- 1975: Pembe İncili Kaftan
- 1975: Topuz
- 1976: Darısı Başınıza
- 1976: Caniko
- 1977: Seyahatname
- 1977: Annemi Hatırlıyorum
- 1977: Hakem Seyfi Dalmaz
- 1977: Şıpsevdi
- 1977: Çözülme
- 1977: Bir Yürek Satıldı
- 1977: Oynaş
- 1977: Çok Sesli Bir Ölüm
- 1977: İstanbul
- 1978: Bağrıyanık Ömer ile Güzel Zeynep
- 1978: At Gözlüğü
- 1978: Denizin Kanı
- 1978: Bizim Sınıf
- 1978: Giyim Kuşam Dünyası
- 1978: Evdekiler
- 1978: Bir Kadının Penceresinden
- 1979: Yorgun Savaşçı
- 1979: Paranın Kiri
- 1979: Tatlı Çarşamba
- 1979: İbiş'in Rüyası
- 1979: Bir Ceza Avukatının Anıları: Emekli Başkan
- 1980: İttihat Ve Terakki
- 1980: Annem Annem
- 1980: Sizin Dersane
- 1980: Sönmüş Ocak
- 1980: Mahmut Mangal
- 1980: Hikayelerden Biri
- 1981: IV. Murat
- 1981: Bağdat Hatun
- 1981: Zaman Mekan Makinesi
- 1981: Flamingo Yolu
- 1982: Hacı Arif Bey
- 1982: Dost Eller
- 1982: Sekiz Sütuna Manşet
- 1982: Tohum ve Toprak
- 1982: Chambre 666
- 1982: Preveze Öncesi
- 1983: Kartallar Yüksek Uçar
- 1983: Üç İstanbul
- 1983: Yalancı Dünya
- 1983: Kurt ve Kuzu
- 1983: Alçaktan Uçan Güvercin
- 1983: Çıplak Ayak
- 1983: Kuruntu Ailesi
- 1984: Küçük Ağa
- 1984: Aliş ile Zeynep
- 1984: Fotoğraftakiler
- 1984: Köşe Dönücü
- 1984: Parkta Bir Sonbahar Günüydü
- 1984: Skape'nin Dolapları
- 1984: Yalnızlar
- 1984: Sessiz Film
- 1985: 32. Gün
- 1985: Kaçaklar
- 1985: Türk Vakıf Medeniyetleri
- 1985: Dokuzuncu Hariciye
- 1985: Kırık Hayatlar
- 1985: Acımak
- 1985: Bay Alkolü Takdimimdir
- 1985: Parmak Damgası
- 1985: Bugünün Saraylısı
- 1986: Ahmet Hamdi Tanpınar
- 1986: Altınkuş Musiki Cemiyeti
- 1986: Bizi Güldürenler
- 1986: Çalıkuşu
- 1986: Duvardaki Kan
- 1986: Gazoz Ağacı
- 1986: Gönül İşi
- 1986: Mardin-Münih Hattı
- 1986: Ölümünün Ellinci Yılında M. Akif Ersoy
- 1986: Perihan Abla
- 1986: Sevgiyi Öğrenen Adam
- 1986: Sızı
- 1986: Şey Bey
- 1986: Uzak Kentin İnsanları (Köprü)
- 1987: Bir Muharrir'in Ölümü
- 1987: Bir Yabancı Konuk
- 1987: Belene
- 1987: Elif Ana-Ayşe Kız
- 1987: Ferhunde Kalfa
- 1987: Gecenin Öteki Yüzü
- 1987: Gönül Dostları
- 1987: Kavanozdaki Adam
- 1987: Kuruluş/Osmancık
- 1987: Saat Sabahın Dokuzu
- 1987: Utanç Yılları
- 1987: Yalnız Efe
- 1987: Yarın Artık Bugündür
- 1987: Yeniden Doğmak
- 1987: Cesur ve Güzel
- 1987: Uzaylı Zekiye
- 1988: Yaprak Dökümü
- 1988: Dünya Durdukça-Mimar Sinan
- 1988: Hisseli Harikalar Kumpanyası
- 1988: Necip Fazıl Kısakürek
- 1988: Ateşten Günler
- 1988: İlk Aşk
- 1988: Halının Türküsü
- 1988: Olacak O Kadar
- 1988: Macide Öğretmen
- 1988: Kavak Yelleri
- 1988: Uğurlugil Ailesi
- 1988: Dudaktan Kalbe
- 1988: Eylül
- 1988: Rıza Beyin Polisiye Öyküleri
- 1988: Dönemeç
- 1988: Keşanlı Ali Destanı
- 1989: Bizimkiler
- 1989: Avrupa'da Türk İzleri
- 1989: Hünkarın Bir Günü
- 1989: Beybaba
- 1989: Geçmiş Bahar Mimozaları
- 1989: İçimizden Biri: Yunus Emre
- 1989: İslam'ın Şartları
- 1989: Doktorlar
- 1989: Lüküs Hayat
- 1989: Manken
- 1989: Beyaz Peçeli Kadın İstanbul da
- 1989: Samanyolu
- 1989: Gönüller Sultanı Mevlana
- 1989: Kanun Savaşçıları
- 1989: Hacı Bektaşı Veli
- 1989: Türkmen Düğünü
- 1989: Kaldırım Serçesi
- 1989: Süleyman Çelebi ve Mevlid
- 1989: İstanbul Efendisi
- 1989: Köy Doktoru
- 1989: Dullar Pansiyonu
- 1989: Can Şenliği
- 1989: Ayaşlı ve Kiracıları
- 1989: Baharın Bittiği Yer
- 1989: Ah Ana
- 1989: Cahide
- 1989: Çaylar Şirketten
- 1989: Kirli Sarı
- 1989: Gençler
- 1989: Ahi Evran
- 1989: 21. Yüzyıla Girerken Türk Ailesi
- 1989: Tatlı Ali
- 1990: Bizim Ev
- 1990: Hayırlı Bir Konu
- 1990: Boğaziçine Sığınanlar
- 1990: Öyle Bir Şey
- 1990: Hanımın Çiftliği
- 1990: Kara Elmas
- 1990: Duygu Çemberi
- 1990: Yuva
- 1990: Dilruba Hanım
- 1990: Orta Bereket
- 1990: Ah Şu Komşularımız
- 1990: Küçük Dünya
- 1990: Bir Milyara Bir Çocuk
- 1990: Başka Olur Ağaların Düğünü
- 1990: Fatih Harbiye
- 1990: İstasyondaki Pastane
- 1990: İz Peşinde
- 1990: Hayat Ağacı
- 1991: Yalnızlar
- 1991: Aile Bağları
- 1991: Bir Ömrün Bedeli
- 1991: Peri Kızı
- 1991: Varsayalım İsmail
- 1991: Ahmet Hamdi Bey Ailesi
- 1991: Kıssadan Hisseler
- 1991: Yarına Gülümsemek
- 1991: Anadolu'nun Kadın Erenleri
- 1991: Vatandaş Ahmet Efendi
- 1991: Geçmişe Açılan Pencere
- 1991: Üçüncü Gözle
- 1991: Yarınlardan Gelen Kız
- 1992: Ayla Öğretmen
- 1992: Aysarının Zilleri
- 1992: Metamorfoz
- 1992: Emret Muhtarım
- 1992: Kopuk Dünyalar
- 1993: Yaz Evi
- 1993: Bizim Mahalle
- 1993: Ferhunde Hanımlar
- 1993: Yazlıkçılar
- 1994: Ah Bir Büyümesek
- 1994: Gülşen Abi
- 1994: Hüsnü Bey Amca
- 1994: Suçlu Kim
- 1994: Geçmişin İzleri
- 1994: Sonradan Görmeler
- 1995: Bizim Aile
- 1996: Cafe Casblanca
- 1996: Kurtuluş
- 1996: Şaşıfelek Çıkmazı
- 1997: Eltiler
- 1998: Üç Yapraklı Yonca
- 1998: Karambol Kamil
- 1998: Yerim Seni
- 1999: Konu Komşu
- 1999: Su Sinekleri
- 1999: Ayrılsak da Beraberiz
- 1999: Aile Bağları
- 2000: Bizim Evin Halleri
- 2000: Dikkat Bebek Var
- 2000: Karakolda Ayna Var
- 2000: Kurşun Kalem
- 2000: Nisan Yağmuru
- 2000: Üzgünüm Leyla
- 2000: Yedi Numara
- 2001: Baba Ocağı
- 2001: Bir Filiz Vardı
- 2001: Bizim Çocuklarımız
- 2001: Dedem, Gofret ve Ben
- 2001: Karanlıkta Koşanlar
- 2001: Maria Bonita
- 2001: Pas Çocuk
- 2001: Tek Celse
- 2001: Vasiyet
- 2001: Yeditepe İstanbul
- 2001: Çiçek Taksi
- 2002: Canım Kocacığım
- 2002: Evli ve Çocuksuz
- 2002: Mihriban
- 2002: En Son Babalar Duyar
- 2002: Koçum Benim
- 2002: Kuzenlerim
- 2003: Havada Bulut
- 2003: Kasabanın İncisi
- 2003: Yuvadan 1 Kuş Uçtu
- 2003: Esir Şehrin İnsanları
- 2003: Çınaraltı
- 2003: 6. His
- 2004: Aşk Buralara Uğramıyor
- 2004: Şeytan Ayrıntıda Gizlidir
- 2004: Kadirşinas
- 2004: Aynalar
- 2004: Ayışığı Neredesin
- 2005: Ne Seninle Ne Sensiz
- 2005: Cumbadan Rumbaya
- 2005: Günün Adamı
- 2005: Zeytin Dalı
- 2005: Üç Kadın
- 2006: Pertev Bey'in Üç Kızı
- 2006: Hayat Türküsü
- 2006: Hisarbuselik
- 2007: Aşk Yeniden
- 2007: Evimin Erkeği
- 2007: Dede Korkut Masalları
- 2007: Güzel Günler
- 2007: İpucu: Krinimal
- 2007: Kınalı Kuzular
- 2007: Sarayın Rüzgarı
- 2008: Babam Adam Olacak
- 2008: Beni Unutma
- 2008: Dalgakıran
- 2008: Dur Yolcu
- 2008: Her Halimle Sev Beni
- 2008: Süper Babaanne
- 2008: Sürgün Hayatlar
- 2008: Mert ile Gert
- 2008: İpsiz Recep
- 2008: Kırmızı Işık
- 2008: Doludizgin Yıllar
- 2009: Bahar Dalları
- 2009: Acemi Müezzin
- 2009: Ah Kalbim
- 2009: Alayına İsyan
- 2009: Aynadaki Düşman
- 2009: Ayrılık
- 2009: Cam Kırıkları
- 2009: Canını Sevdigim İstanbul'u
- 2009: Çılgın Kanal
- 2009: Çocukluk Günleri
- 2009: Hesaplaşma
- 2009: İstanbulda Aşık Oldum
- 2009: Karşı Köyün Delisi
- 2009: Kaybedenler
- 2009: Kısaca Ramazan
- 2009: M.A.T.
- 2009: Sivas: Aşıklar Bayramı
- 2009: Yapma Diyorum
- 2009: Hicran Yarası
- 2009: Zoraki Başkan
- 2009: Ramazan Güzeldir
- 2009: Sakarya Fırat
- 2010: Abur Cubur
- 2010: Sınıf
- 2010: Gökkuşağı Çocukları
- 2010: Hanımeli Sokağı
- 2010: Halil İbrahim Sofrası
- 2010: Küstüm Çiçeği
- 2010: Yerden Yüksek
- 2010: Elde Var Hayat
- 2011: Adım Bayram Bayram
- 2011: Hayata Beş Kala
- 2011: Kayıp Aranıyor
- 2011: Komiser Rex
- 2011: Mazi Kalbimde Yaradır
- 2011: Su'dan Sebepler
- 2011: Yamak Ahmet
- 2011: Yeniden Başla
- 2011: Başrolde Aşk
- 2011: Küçük Hanımefendi
- 2011: Mavi Kelebekler
- 2011: Mor Menekşeler
- 2011: Sen de Gitme
- 2011: Tacir
- 2011: Leyla ile Mecnun
- 2011: Avrupa Avrupa
- 2012: Bir Zamanlar Osmanlı
- 2012: Bir Zamanlar Osmanlı: Kıyam
- 2012: Bulutların Ötesi
- 2012: Evvel Zaman Hikayesi
- 2012: Esir Sultan
- 2012: Korkma
- 2012: Kurt Kanunu
- 2012: Prensin Şarkısı
- 2012: Sarayın Incisi
- 2012: 6 Mantı
- 2012: Şubat
- 2012: Yol Ayrımı
- 2012: Böyle Bitmesin
- 2012: Zengin Kız Fakir Oğlan
- 2013: Bir Yastıkta
- 2013: En Uzun Yüzyıl
- 2013: Eski Hikaye
- 2013: Gurbette Aşk
- 2013: Gönül Hırsızı
- 2013: Osmanlı Tokadı
- 2013: Beni Böyle Sev
- 2014: Bir Yusuf Masalı
- 2014: Hayat Ağacı
- 2014: Kızılelma
- 2014: Yedikule Hayat Yokuşu
- 2014: Aşkın Kanunu
- 2014: Şimdi Onlar Düşünsün
- 2014: Filnita
- 2014: Filinta
- 2014: Yedi Güzel Adam
- 2015: Baba Candır
- 2015: Heredot Cevdet Saati
- 2015: Milat
- 2017: Kalk Gidelim

=== Foreign shows or series ===
- Escrava Isaura
- Flamingo Road
- Dempsey and Makepeace
- Moonlighting
- Golden Girls
- Knight Rider
- The Monroes
- Barnaby Jones
- McMillan & Wife
- The Citadel
- Kung Fu
- Shogun
- Tales of the Gold Monkey
- Voyagers!
- Falcon Crest
- Yes Minister
- Mission: Impossible
- Dallas
- Space: 1999
- Perfect Strangers
- L.A. Law
- The Life and Times of Grizzly Adams
- Charles in Charge
- The White Shadow
- Bonanza
- Miami Vice
- Hart to Hart
- Charlie's Angels
- Petrocelli
- Battlestar Galactica
- Seven Brides for Seven Brothers
- Roots
- The Fugitive
- The Onedin Line
- The Waltons
- Star Trek
- Cheers
- Bewitched
- Logan's Run
- Blake's 7
- Magnum, P.I.
- The Six Million Dollar Man
- Little House on the Prairie
- Taxi
- Rich Man, Poor Man
- Supergran
- The Persuaders!
- The Saint
- Maelstorm
- Flipper
- North and South
- Amanda's
- Run for Your Life
- Silver Spoons
- Webster
- Robin of Sherwood
- The Love Boat
- The Streets of San Francisco
- The Cosby Show
- V
- The Adventures of Black Beauty
- The Avengers
- Daktari
- Quantum Leap
- Santa Barbara
- The Equalizer
- Wish Me Luck
- The Magician
- Banacek
- Police Woman
- Baretta
- Columbo
- All My Children
- Everybody Loves Raymond
- CSI: Crime Scene Investigation
- 7th Heaven
- Return to Eden
- Father Knows Best
- Holmes & Yo-Yo
- Quincy, M.E.
- Northern Exposure
- McCoy
- Roseanne
- Eight Is Enough
- Cagney & Lacey
- Simon & Simon
- seaQuest DSV
- Life Goes On
- Beverly Hills, 90210
- Goof Troop
- Kim Possible
- Recess
- American Dragon: Jake Long
- Lilo & Stitch: The Series
- Ocean Girl
