= Kayra Zabcı =

Turkish actress (born 2001)

- Born: Kayra Aleyna Zabcı; 24 August 2001 (age 25); Istanbul, Turkey
- Education: Istanbul University State Conservatory
- Occupation: Actress
- Years active: 2013–present

Kayra Aleyna Zabcı (born 21 August 2001) is a Turkish actress known for her role as the character of Oya in the series Canım Annem and as Seferiye Hatun in the Turkish historical series Alparslan: Büyük Selçuklu. Zabcı was born in 2001 in Istanbul, Turkey.

== Early life ==
Zabcı was born on 21 August 2001 in Istanbul, Turkey. She attended high school at Mimar Sinan Fine Arts High School and is currently a student at the Acting Department of the Istanbul University State Conservatory.

== Career ==
Zabcı started acting from the age of 12. She won first place in the 2013 Best Model Child Turkey and Best Child Model of the World competitions. She appeared in various shows and starred as the female lead in the second season of the popular Turkish historical fiction series Alparslan: Büyük Selçuklu. She portrayed the role of Seferiye Hatun, one of the wives of Alparslan, the second sultan of the Seljuk Empire. She later took the lead role of Yasemin in Kanal D's daily series Bizi Birleştiren Hayat, which premiered in September 2024 and ran for about 150 episodes.

== Filmography ==
=== Television ===
Year	Title	Role	Notes
2013	Harem		3 episodes
2013–2014	Muhteşem Yüzyıl	Ayşe Hümaşah Sultan	Supporting role
2014	Küçük Ağa		2 episodes
2014	Aşktan Kaçılmaz		11 episodes
2015	Aydamaya	Ada	
2016	Seddülbahir 32 Saat		Mini series
2017–2018	Vatanım Sensin		3 episodes
2018–2019	Gülperi	Young Gülperi	14 episodes
2019–2020	Doğduğun Ev Kaderindir	Yasemin	12 episodes
2022	Canım Annem	Oya	3 episodes
2022	Another Self		2 episodes
2022–2023	Alparslan: Büyük Selçuklu	Seferiye Hatun	Leading role
2024–2025	Bizi Birleştiren Hayat	Yasemin	Leading role
2026-	Susuz Yaz	Gülşen	Side character

=== Film ===
Year	Title	Role
2006	Küçük Kıyamet	
2017	Yeni Başlayanlar İçin Hayatta Kalma Sanatı	Elif
