= Okur =

Okur is a Turkish surname. Notable people with the surname include:

- Mehmet Okur (born 1979), Turkish retired basketball player who played in the National Basketball Association
- Şaziye Okur (born 1992), Turkish female weightlifter competing in the Women's 48 kg division
- Yurdaer Okur (born 1974), Turkish actor
