= Nina Caicedo =

Colombian actress

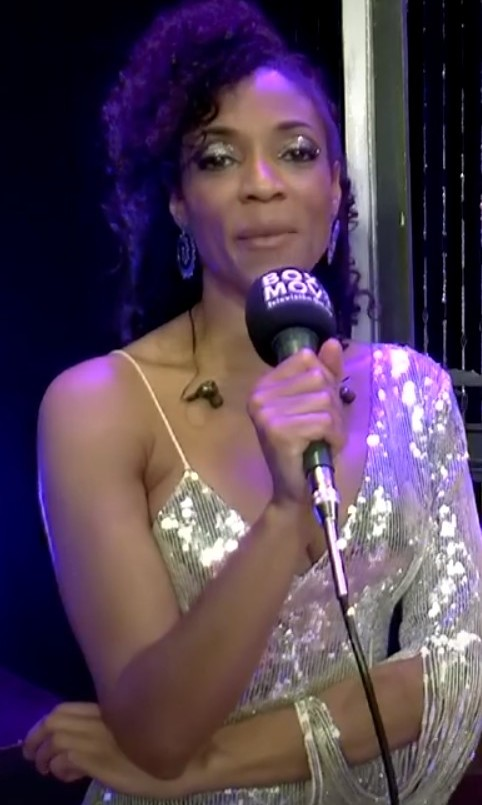
- In a 2021 interview
- Born: Nina Caicedo Vargas; 3 February 1986 (age 39); Quibdó, Colombia
- Education: Universidad Externado de Colombia
- Occupation(s): Actress, model, lawyer

Nina Caicedo Vargas (born 3 February 1986) is a Colombian film and television actress, model, and lawyer, recognized for her appearances in productions such as Las detectivas y el Víctor, Azúcar, The White Slave, The Girl, and Nurses.

== Biography ==
Nina Caicedo was born in Quibdó on 3 February 1986, the daughter of musician, composer, and music producer Saturnino Caicedo Córdoba (known professionally as Nino Caicedo), and singer and psychologist Nimia Teresa Vargas Cuesta. She is the sister of singer and actor Anddy Caicedo. She studied law at the Universidad Externado de Colombia, and began working as an actress in the 2000s. Her first big break came in 2009 when she played Nelly in the television series Las detectivas y el Víctor. In 2010, she had a brief appearance in Sergio Cabrera's telenovela La Pola.

In the 2010s, she had more prominent television and film roles in her native country. In 2012, she joined the cast of the series Bazurto, followed by an appearance in the telenovela La selección. In 2016, Caicedo starred in the series The White Slave as Sara, Azúcar as Lola Ocoró, and The Girl as Vanessa Mosquera. In 2017, she returned to cinema with a supporting role in the Spanish film Loving Pablo. A year later, she starred with Mario Duarte in the comedy film Pelucas y Rokanrol, where she played a police sergeant.

In 2019, she starred in the series Nurses on Canal RCN, playing the role of Sol Angie Velásquez. She also appeared in the Telepacífico miniseries Leonor.

== Filmography ==
=== TV series ===
| Year | Title | Role | Channel |
|---|---|---|---|
| 2008 | La hija del mariachi | | Canal RCN |
| 2008–2009 | Sin senos no hay paraíso | Alina | Telemundo |
| 2008–2010 | Oye bonita | | Caracol Televisión |
| 2009–2010 | Las detectivas y el Víctor | Nelly | Canal RCN |
| 2010 | El cartel | Jessica | Caracol Televisión |
| 2010–2011 | La Pola | Acacia | Canal RCN |
| 2013–2014 | La selección | Nely Asprilla | Caracol Televisión |
| 2014 | Bazurto | Celina | Caracol Televisión |
| 2016 | Azúcar | Lola Ocoró | Canal RCN |
| 2016 | The White Slave | Sara | Caracol Televisión |
| 2016 | The Girl | Vanessa Mosquera | Caracol Televisión |
| 2018 | Wild District | Misury | Netflix |
| 2018–2019 | Heart's Decree | Anabel García | Canal RCN |
| 2019 | Always a Witch | Esclava Hoguera | Netflix |
| 2019 | Leonor | | Telepacífico |
| 2019–2022 | Nurses | Sol Angie Velásquez | Canal RCN |
| 2021 | Fábulas del confinamiento | Andrea Jiménez | Canal Capital |
| 2021 | The Unremarkable Juanquini | Agente Alika | Netflix |
| 2022 | Vicente, el imprudente | Sol Angie Velásquez | Canal RCN |

=== Films ===
| Year | Title | Role | Director |
|---|---|---|---|
| 2017 | Loving Pablo | Woman | Fernando León de Aranoa |
| 2018 | Pelucas y Rokanrol | Gina | Mario Duarte |
