= Sevtap Özaltun =

Turkish actress (born 1984)

- Born: 12 September 1984 (age 41); Istanbul, Turkey
- Education: Haliç University State Conservatory, Department of Theatre
- Occupation: Actress
- Years active: 2010–present
- Agent: Şogen Film Music Production

Sevtap Özaltun (born 12 September 1984) is a Turkish television, film and theatre actress. She is originally from Arhavi, Artvin.

== Life and career ==
She was born on 12 September 1984, in Istanbul. After graduating from the Theatre Department of the Haliç University Conservatory, the young actress began her acting career by appearing in commercials. She appeared in commercials for Yapı Kredi, Turkcell, Bebelac, and Falım.

She became known for her role as "Asude/Hacer Ovacıklı" in the television series Fatmagül'ün Suçu Ne?, starring Engin Akyürek and Beren Saat. In 2013, she also portrayed the character "Ece" in the series A.Ş.K., broadcast on Kanal D. In 2014, she portrayed the character "Derya" in the production Ulan İstanbul, which premiered as a summer series on Kanal D.

== Filmography ==
Year	Production	Role	Format	Network	Notes
2007	Hakkını Helal Et		Television series	Samanyolu TV	
2008	Canım Ailem	Ahsen	Television series	atv	
2010–2012	Fatmagül'ün Suçu ne?	Hacer / Asu(de)	Television series	Kanal D	
2011	Devrimden Sonra	Elif	Film	-	Lead role
2013	A.Ş.K.	Ece	Television series	Kanal D	
2014–2015	Ulan İstanbul	Derya	Television series	Kanal D	Lead role
2014	Yağmur: Kıyamet Çiçeği	Seher	Film	-	
2016–2017	Sevda Kuşun Kanadında	Tümay Erbay	Television series	TRT 1	Lead role
2018	Düş Kırgınları	Refugee	Film	-	
2018	Gülizar	Mine	Television series	Kanal D	
2018	Çarpışma	Aslı Adalı	Television series	Show TV	
2019	Kimse Bilmez	Özlem	Television series	atv	
2021	Hekimoğlu	Sevda Nurse	Television series	Kanal D	
2021	Hükümsüz	Sevtap	Web series	Exxen	
2021	Muallim	Rabia	Film	-	Lead role
2024	Kara Ağaç Destanı	Zeynep	Television series	TRT 1	

== Theatre plays ==
Year	Play	Role	Source	Notes
2013	Oyun Sandalı (HAYYAM Ab-ı Hayat)			Lead role
2015	Son Zenne	Nesibe		Lead role
