= Barış Bağcı =

Turkish actor (born 1975)

Barış Bağcı (born 27 May 1975, Karaman) is a Turkish theater, cinema, and television actor. He is known for his role as Baiju Noyan in the TV series Diriliş: Ertuğrul. Also, he portrayed as Rashid ad-Din Sinan in TV series Kudüs Fatihi Selahaddin Eyyubi

== Biography ==
He graduated from the Konya Selçuk University Conservatory's theater department. After working in Trabzon State Theater, he continued his career at Istanbul State Theater.

He played in adaptations of Turkish classic novels Küçük Hanımefendi, Yaprak Dökümü.

He played in period series "Kırık Kanatlar". He played the Mongol commander Baycu Noyan in Diriliş: Ertuğrul. He played the role of Sultan Tuğrul Bey in Alparslan: Büyük Selçuklu.

He played in TV films "Çember".

== Filmography ==
=== Television ===
Title	Role	Year
Gümüş	Emir	2005
Kırık Kanatlar	Halim	2006–2007
Yaralı Yürek	Veysel	2007
Yaprak Dökümü	Ali Sarper	2009–2010
Küçük Hanımefendi	Ömer	2011–2012
Kara Kutu	Katip Günal	2015
Diriliş: Ertuğrul	Baiju Noyan	2015–2016, 2019
Çember	Başkomiser Barış	2017
Masumlar Apartmanı	Cüneyt	2020–2021
Alparslan: Büyük Selçuklu	Tughril	2021-2023
Kudüs Fatihi Selahaddin Eyyubi	Rashid ad-Din Sinan	2023
Mehmed: Fetihler Sultanı	Bahadır Hamza Pasha	2025–2026

=== Film ===
Title	Role	Year
Pars: Operation Cherry	Kadir Zebari	2006
Breath	Lieutenant Barış	2009
Losers' Club	Devrim	2010
Pazarları Hiç Sevmem	Ali	2011
