= Cheila (film) =

Cheila: Una Casa Pa' Maita
- Directed by: Eduardo Barberena
- Written by: Elio Palencia
- Produced by: Nelson Carranza
- Starring: Endry Cardeño; Violeta Alemán; José Manuel Suárez
- Cinematography: Mahmood Patel
- Edited by: Yolimar Aquino
- Music by: José Ramón Carranza
- Distributed by: Fundación Villa del Cine
- Release dates: October 27, 2009 (Festival Premiere); July 16, 2010 (Theatrical Release)
- Running time: 90 minutes
- Country: Venezuela
- Language: Spanish

Cheila (Spanish: Cheila: Una Casa Pa' Maita) is a 2009 Venezuelan tragicomedy film directed by Eduardo Barberena based on the theatrical play La Quinta Dayana written by Elio Palencia. It was first premiered at the 2009 Mérida Film Festival receiving the Best Movie and other five awards it was then released in theaters on 16 July 2010.

== Plot ==
Cheila is a transsexual who has come back from Canada to spend holidays at the quinta she bought for her mother years ago, seeking family support before undergoing her sexual reassignment surgery. Upon her arrival she finds the once luxurious house completely deteriorated and inhabited by her lazy and unemployed brothers with their wives and children. The financial problems and chaotic situations surrounding her relatives make her reconsider her relationship with them and herself.

The movie uses flashbacks to show Cheila's experiences when she was Cheíto.

== Cast ==
- Endry Cardeño as Cheila
- José Manuel Suárez as Cheíto
- Violeta Alemán as Maíta
- Aura Rivas as Abuela
- Elodie Bernardeau as Katy
- Luke Grande as Bachaco
- Nelson Acosta as Guicho
- Freddy Aquino as Dayán
- Patricia Pacheco as Noreidis

== See also ==
- List of Venezuelan films
- List of lesbian, gay, bisexual or transgender-related films
