= Sarp Levendoğlu =

Turkish actor (1981)

- Born: Ali Sarp Levendoğlu; 25 December 1981 (age 44); Ankara, Turkey
- Occupations: Actor, director
- Years active: 2002–present
- Spouse: Birce Akalay (m. 2014; div. 2017)
- Relatives: Mustafa Altıoklar (uncle)

Ali Sarp Levendoğlu (born 25 December 1981) is a Turkish actor and director.

Levendoğlu started acting at the age of six. After studying at Saint-Benoît French High School, he studied visual communication design at Istanbul Bilgi University before getting a degree in acting from Istanbul Kültür University. As the nephew of director Mustafa Altıoklar, he started his acting career by taking part in his uncle's works. Levendoğlu also worked as a director in the TV series Emret Komutanım and Gece Gündüz.

He was cast in a number of hit military series, including Emret Komutanım, Gece Gündüz, Savaşçı, O Şimdi Asker, Sakarya Fırat, Şevkat Tepe. He played as Kabadayı Akif in period series "Mor Menekşeler" based on the life of "Kabadayı Mehmet". He portrayed Romanos IV Diogenes in Alparslan: Büyük Selçuklu.

Also, he played in hit youth series Lise Defteri, Çınaraltı, surreal series "Zeliha'nın Gözleri", child series "Küçük Ağa".

== Filmography ==
Film
Year	Title	Role	Notes
2002	O Şimdi Asker	Yunan asker	Supporting role
2007	Emret Komutanım Şah Mat	Üsteğmen Levent	Leading role
2016	Deliormanlı	Savaş Türkyılmaz	Leading role
2016	Resimdeki Sevgili	Engin	Leading role
2016	Adam ve Çocuk	Halit	Leading role (TV film)
2017	Nereden Nereye	Metin Leylek	Leading role
2018	İki İyi Çocuk	Serdar	Leading role
Television
Year	Title	Role	Notes
2003	Lise Defteri	Mehmet	
2004	Çınaraltı	İbrahim	
2005, 2008	Emret Komutanım	Üsteğmen Levent	Director, actor
2007	Zeliha'nın Gözleri	Rehan	
2007	Yasak Elma		Guest appearance
2008–2009	Gece Gündüz	Aslan Aydemir	Director, leading role
2009	Altın Kızlar		Guest appearance
2009	Uygun Adım Aşk		Director
2010	Kirli Beyaz	Yekta	Guest appearance
2010	Kalp Ağrısı	Hasan	Guest appearance
2011	Mor Menekşeler	Kabadayı Akif	Leading role
2012	Atlılar		Not released
2013	Sakarya Fırat	Altan Barut	Guest appearance
2013	Galip Derviş	Hilmi Çalışır	Guest appearance
2013	Böyle Bitmesin	Serkan	Guest appearance
2014	Şefkat Tepe	Kılıç Başkan	Guest appearance
2014–2015	Küçük Ağa	Ali	Leading role
2015	Ne Münasebet	Demir	Leading role
2017	Ölene Kadar	Ender	Leading role
2017–2021	Savaşçı	Haydar Bozkurt	Leading role
2021-2022, 2023- present	Alparslan: Büyük Selçuklu	Romanos IV Diogenes	Leading role
2022–	Gecenin Ucunda	Ahmet Işık	Leading role
2022	Macerasever	Himself	Presenter
2023–2024	Teşkilat	Pehlivan	
Web series
Year	Title	Role	Notes
2021	N Kuşağı	Commissioner Ali	Guest appearance
