= Nurses (Colombian TV series) =

Colombian medical drama television series

- Genre: Telenovela
- Written by: Patricia Ramírez; Juliana Lema; Carolina Barrera; Rodrigo Holguín
- Directed by: Víctor Cantillo; Lucho Sierra
- Creative director: Patricia Ramírez
- Starring: Diana Hoyos; Sebastián Carvajal; Viña Machado; Julián Trujillo; Lucho Velasco; Nina Caicedo; Federico Rivera; María Manuela Gómez; Cristian Rojas
- Country of origin: Colombia
- Original language: Spanish
- No. of seasons: 2
- No. of episodes: 429 (list of episodes)

Production
- Executive producer: Ana María Pérez
- Production company: RCN Televisión

Original release
- Network: Canal RCN
- Release: 23 October 2019 – 12 August 2022

Nurses (Spanish: Enfermeras) is a Colombian medical drama television series produced by Ana María Pérez that aired on RCN Televisión from 23 October 2019 to 12 August 2022. The series focuses on the lives of several nurses, specifically focusing on the life of María Clara González (Diana Hoyos).

== Plot ==
María Clara González (Diana Hoyos) works as the head of nurses in one of the most recognized hospitals in the city: the Santa Rosa. Life would seem to smile at her were it not for the monotony into which her marriage with Román has fallen, with whom she has two children. On the day of her anniversary, María Clara makes the decision to win her husband back and reserves a hotel room to spend the night with him. However, Román suffers a heart attack at the scene and is transferred to an emergency to receive medical help. María Clara spends the night at his side. The next day, a woman named Paula arrives, accompanied by her young son, and tells the nurse that it is Román's first-born son. From there, Maria Clara becomes increasingly disillusioned with her husband, to the point of planning their divorce.

On the other hand, a young resident of internal medicine arrives at the hospital, Dr. Carlos Pérez (Sebastián Carvajal), who immediately has a special connection with María Clara, later becoming more than a friend. However, their relationship will be clouded by multiple obstacles, when Maritza and Valeriano, Carlos's wife and father, respectively, find out what happens between them. In addition, María Clara's enmity with boss Gloria, her children's opposition to her new love, the turbulent business that occurs within the hospital on behalf of Manuel Castro (Lucho Velasco), its scientific director, and the appearance of a new person in Dr. Pérez's life will make their lives take different directions.

== Cast ==
=== Main ===
- Diana Hoyos as María Clara González
- Sebastián Carvajal as Carlos Pérez
- Viña Machado as Gloria Mayorga Moreno
- Julián Trujillo as Álvaro Rojas
- Lucho Velasco as Manuel Alberto Castro
- Nina Caicedo as Sol Angie Velásquez
- Federico Rivera as Héctor Rubiano "Coco"
- María Manuela Gómez as Valentina Duarte González
- Cristian Rojas as Camilo Duarte González
- Luciano D'Alessandro as Félix Andrade
- Majida Issa as Alex Luján
- Javier Jattin as Juan Pablo Valderrama

=== Recurring ===
- Andrés Suárez Montoya as Agustín Garnica
- Tatiana Ariza as Helena Prieto
- Vince Balanta as Fabio Mosquera
- Andrea Rey as Nelly Mejía
- Alejandra Correa as Inés Chacón
- Viviana Posada as Ivonne Ramírez
- Mariana Gómez as Maritza Ferrari
- Susana Rojas as Paula Rivera
- Pedro Palacio as Román Duarte
- Nayra Castillo as Psicóloga Esperanza
- Miguel González as Felipe Mackenzie
- Pedro Calvo as Iñaki Ventura
- Juan Fernando Sánchez as Ernesto Álvarez
- Ricardo Vélez as Bernard Mackenzie
- Marcela Posada as Ruby Palacino
- Martha Liliana Ruiz as Jefe Evelyn
- Hugo Gómez as Valeriano Pérez
- María Cecilia Botero as Beatriz Ramírez
- Jessica Mariana Cruz as Mariana Cruz
- Diego Garzón as Luis Tarazona
- Mario Espitia as Jaime Guerra
- Bárbara Perea as Petra
- Andrés Durán as Richi
- Óscar Salazar as Óscar Peñate
- Alexandra Serrano as Milena de Peñate
- Tiberio Cruz as Dr. Castillo

== Production ==
The series has a format similar to La ley del corazón where in each episode there will be a different case, which will resolve in the same episode. In addition, the series has a team of scriptwriters who are: Patricia Ramírez, Carolina López, Catalina Palomino, Juliana Lema, Rodrigo Holguín, Carolina Becerra, Jorge Ribón, Andrés Guevara, Catalina Coy, Diego Chálela, Johanna Gutiérrez, and as scene directors are: Víctor Cantillo and Luis Sierra. Also is stipulated to have 100 episodes of one hour, it was presented at the 2019 MIPCOM, along with other series such as El man es Germán,

== Episodes ==
Due to the COVID-19 pandemic in Colombia, RCN Televisión temporarily suspended the telenovela, broadcasting the last episode on 20 March 2020. New episodes resumed on 12 January 2021.

Season	Episodes	Originally released	
Season	Episodes	First released	Last released
1	100	23 October 2019	20 March 2020
2	329	12 January 2021	12 August 2022

== Television ratings ==
Viewership and ratings per season of Nurses
Season	Episodes	First aired		Last aired		Avg. viewers (millions)
Season	Episodes	Date	Viewers (millions)	Date	Viewers (millions)	Avg. viewers (millions)
1	100	23 October 2019	6.4	20 March 2020	12.7	9.0
2	242	12 January 2021	7.8	12 August 2022	TBD	7.4

== Awards and nominations ==
Year	Award	Category	Nominated	Result
2020	India Catalina Awards	Best Leading Actress in a Telenovela or Series	Diana Hoyos	Won
2020	India Catalina Awards	Best Public Favorite Talent	Sebastián Carvajal	Won
2020	India Catalina Awards	Best Antagonistic Actress in a Telenovela or Series	Viña Machado	Won
2020	India Catalina Awards	Best Antagonistic Actor in a Telenovela or Series	Lucho Velasco	Won
2020	India Catalina Awards	Best Children's Talent in the National Audiovisual Industry	Cristian Rojas	Won
