= Emmanuel Esparza =

Spanish actor

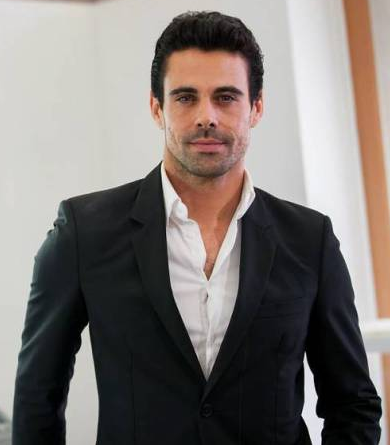
- Born: 2 March 1976 (age 49); Valencia, Spain
- Occupation: Actor
- Years active: 2005–present
- Children: 1

Emmanuel Esparza (born 2 March 1976) is a Spanish actor based in Colombia, where he became popular for his performances in La Pola (2010–2011) and Mentiras perfectas (2013–2014). He has also starred in Fugitivos (2014) and Venganza (2017). Later that same year, it was highlighted internationally in the Telemundo's crime drama series El Señor de los Cielos, where he played Tony Pastrana, the main antagonist throughout Season 5.

== Personal life ==
He maintained a relationship with actress and model Cristina Warner. In 2015 his first daughter Zoe was born.

== Filmography ==
Television roles
Year	Title	Roles	Notes
2006	El cas de la núvia dividida	Freddie	Television film
2006	Cartas de Sorolla	Unknown	Television film
2006–2007	La dársena de poniente	Rubén	19 episodes
2007	Les moreres	Luis Cantudo Escribano	
2007–2009	Yo soy Bea	Nacho	Series regular; 289 episodes
2007	Cuerpo a la carta	Javier	Television film
2008	Martini, il valenciano	Charles Lepicq	Television film
2010–2011	La Pola	Alejandro Sabbarain	Main role; 182 episodes
2013	Mentiras perfectas	Cristóbal Alzáte	Main role; 58 episodes
2014	Fugitivos	Julián Duarte	Main role; 40 episodes
2016	Sala de urgencias	Eduardo Mejia	Recurring role (season 2); 49 episodes
2017	Venganza	César Riaño	Main role; 124 episodes
2017	El Señor de los Cielos	Antonio "Tony" Pastrana	Series regular (season 5); 73 episodes
2018	Sitiados	Bocanegra	Series regular (season 2); 8 episodes
2019	Secretos de Estado	Alberto Guzmán	Main role (season 1); 13 episodes
2020	The Queen and the Conqueror	Pedro de Heredia	Main role
