= The Queen and the Conqueror =

Colombian television series

- Genre: Historical period drama
- Created by: Johhny Ortiz
- Directed by: Camilo Villamizar; Juan Carlos Vásquez
- Country of origin: Colombia
- Original language: Spanish
- No. of seasons: 1
- No. of episodes: 60

Original release
- Network: Netflix
- Release: 20 May 2020

The Queen and the Conqueror (Spanish: La reina de Indias y el conquistador), is a Colombian historical drama television series created by Johhny Ortiz, and directed by Camilo Villamizar, and Juan Carlos Vásquez. The series revolves around the history that led to the founding of the city of Cartagena de Indias, of major importance in the Americas. The series is recorded in 4K Ultra-high-definition television. The show is filmed in Colombia, specifically in Sierra Nevada de Santa Marta, the banks of the Magdalena River and Palomino, Villa de Leyva, and Santa Fe de Antioquia. It stars Essined Rivera Aponte, and Emmanuel Esparza as the main characters.

The series premiered on streaming on 20 May 2020 on Netflix.

== Cast ==
- Essined Rivera Aponte as La India Catalina
- Emmanuel Esparza as Pedro de Heredia
- Juliette Arrieta as Sanya
- Manuel Navarro as Diego Nicuesa
- Carlos Kajú as Enriquillo
- Gilma Escobar as Abuela de Toto
- Ilenia Antonini as Luz
- Aroha Hafez as Beatriz
- Alejandro Rodríguez as Pedro Badillo
- Wolframio Sinué as Cacique Galeras
- Cristina Warner as Gloria Badillo
- Maia Landaburu as Constaza Franco
- Fernando Campo as Alberto de Heredía
- Álvaro Benet as José Buendía
- Camilo Jiménez as Falla
- Patricia Castañeda as Criada Carmela
- Jairo Camargo as Arturo
- Adelaida Buscato as Genoveva
- Mercedes Salazar as Inés de López
- Luis Mesa as Fernando de Valenzuela
- Tahimí Alvariño as Isabela I de Castilla
- Kepa Amuchastegui as Bartolomé de las Casas
- Lucho Velasco as Moa
- Alejandro Muñoz as Alonso Montes

== Awards and nominations ==
Year	Award	Category	Nominated	Result	Ref
2020	Produ Awards	Best Superseries	La reina de Indias y el conquistador	Nominated	
2020	Produ Awards	Best Producer	Asier Aguilar	Nominated	
2020	Produ Awards	Best Music Composer	Jox	Nominated	
2020	Produ Awards	Best Lead Actor	Emmanuel Esparza	Nominated	
