= List of Nurses (Colombian TV series) episodes =

The following is a list of episodes of the Colombian telenovela Nurses, which premiered on 23 October 2019 on RCN Televisión and ended its first season on 20 March 2020 due to the COVID-19 pandemic in Colombia. On 12 January 2021, the new episodes were resumed with the broadcast of a second season.

During the course of the series, 429 episodes of Nurses aired over two seasons, concluding on 12 August 2022.

== Series overview ==
Season	Episodes	Originally released	
Season	Episodes	First released	Last released
1	100	23 October 2019	20 March 2020
2	329	12 January 2021	12 August 2022

== Episodes ==
=== Season 1 (2019–20) ===
No. overall	No. in season	Title	Original release date	Colombia viewers (Rating points)
1	1	"María Clara se entera de la verdad"	23 October 2019	6.4
2	2	"Gloria es la nueva coordinadora"	24 October 2019	6.0
3	3	"Valentina comete un grave error"	25 October 2019	6.2
4	4	"Gloria enfrenta a Manuel"	28 October 2019	5.9
5	5	"Sol Angie es atacada"	29 October 2019	6.3
6	6	"Manuel y Gloria ocultan un crimen"	30 October 2019	6.4
7	7	"María Clara termina su relación con Román"	31 October 2019	5.5
8	8	"María Clara se aloja en el hospital"	1 November 2019	6.7
9	9	"Maritza llega a la casa de Carlos"	5 November 2019	7.5
10	10	"Fabio recibe un difícil caso"	6 November 2019	6.6
11	11	"La junta toma una decisión"	7 November 2019	7.4
12	12	"Una discusión definitiva"	8 November 2019	6.0
13	13	"María Clara le hace un fuerte reclamo a Carlos"	12 November 2019	6.5
14	14	"María Clara enfrenta un difícil caso"	13 November 2019	6.3
15	15	"Sol le confiesa todo a Héctor"	14 November 2019	6.6
16	16	"Ernesto llega al hospital"	15 November 2019	4.9
17	17	"Carlos confiesa que le gusta María Clara"	18 November 2019	7.5
18	18	"Un almuerzo de interés"	19 November 2019	6.6
19	19	"María Clara le deja las cosas claras a Carlos"	20 November 2019	6.5
20	20	"Román descubre a Valentina"	21 November 2019	6.3
21	21	"Sol Angie le da una buena noticia a Héctor"	22 November 2019	6.2
22	22	"Carlos besa a María Clara"	25 November 2019	8.5
23	23	"Carlos le cuenta la verdad a Maritza"	26 November 2019	7.6
24	24	"María Clara se cambia de look"	27 November 2019	7.0
25	25	"Maritza se encuentra con María Clara"	28 November 2019	7.2
26	26	"Paula se entera de que Román le es infiel"	29 November 2019	8.1
27	27	"Valentina encuentra a Román con Paula"	2 December 2019	7.3
28	28	"El hospital Santa Rosa entra en paro"	3 December 2019	7.5
29	29	"Castro amenaza a Gloria"	4 December 2019	8.0
30	30	"Ernesto confronta a Carlos"	5 December 2019	8.3
31	31	"Álvaro, a punto de revelar su secreto"	6 December 2019	7.7
32	32	"María Clara descubre la verdad sobre Álvaro"	9 December 2019	7.8
33	33	"Valeriano le hace una difícil propuesta a Castro"	10 December 2019	7.5
34	34	"Ernesto besa a María Clara"	11 December 2019	8.3
35	35	"María Clara recibe una noticia"	12 December 2019	8.2
36	36	"María Clara soluciona su situación con Carlos"	13 December 2019	6.8
37	37	"Maritza y Carlos sufren un grave accidente"	16 December 2019	8.0
38	38	"Maritza presenta muerte cerebral"	17 December 2019	8.6
39	39	"El funeral de Maritza"	18 December 2019	7.9
40	40	"Carlos aprueba que Simón viva con Beatriz"	19 December 2019	7.7
41	41	"Héctor se enfrenta con Fabio"	20 December 2019	5.7
42	42	"Carlos es acusado por un paciente"	23 December 2019	6.6
43	43	"María Clara demanda a Román"	26 December 2019	7.1
44	44	"Carlos y María Clara comienzan una relación"	30 December 2019	6.5
45	45	"María Clara se arriesga con Carlos"	2 January 2020	7.0
46	46	"Carlos no puede salvar un amor eterno"	3 January 2020	7.6
47	47	"Camilo deberá batallar por su vida"	7 January 2020	8.7
48	48	"Valentina se entera de la verdad"	8 January 2020	9.1
49	49	"Carlos se enfrenta con Valeriano"	9 January 2020	8.9
50	50	"Román llega a donde María Clara"	10 January 2020	10.0
51	51	"Carlos es rechazado por Valentina y Camilo"	13 January 2020	10.0
52	52	"Carlos se reencuentra con su hijo"	14 January 2020	9.9
53	53	"El hospital apoya a Camilo"	15 January 2020	10.0
54	54	"Carlos enfrenta a Beatriz"	16 January 2020	11.0
55	55	"Camilo atraviesa una difícil etapa"	17 January 2020	10.1
56	56	"María Clara termina su relación con Carlos"	20 January 2020	10.5
57	57	"Carlos intenta convencer a María Clara"	21 January 2020	9.1
58	58	"Carlos sorprende a María Clara con una propuesta"	22 January 2020	10.6
59	59	"Álvaro recibe una amenaza"	23 January 2020	10.4
60	60	"Lorna Cepeda llega al hospital Santa Rosa"	24 January 2020	11.2
61	61	"Álvaro cede a quienes lo buscan"	27 January 2020	9.0
62	62	"Castro revela la verdad"	28 January 2020	9.8
63	63	"Carlos regresa a Medellín"	29 January 2020	10.3
64	64	"Carlos conoce a Helena"	30 January 2020	8.9
65	65	"Ernesto amanece con Gloria"	31 January 2020	11.1
66	66	"Castro descubre a Gloria"	3 February 2020	9.5
67	67	"María Clara descubre un grave problema en el hospital"	4 February 2020	10.6
68	68	"Álvaro se desilusiona de Felipe"	5 February 2020	10.5
69	69	"Bernard Mackenzie se entera de la verdad"	6 February 2020	9.6
70	70	"María Clara busca pruebas contra Castro"	7 February 2020	9.8
71	71	"Richi amenaza a Carlos"	10 February 2020	10.1
72	72	"Gloria delata a Castro"	11 February 2020	10.4
73	73	"Castro intenta borrar las pruebas"	12 February 2020	10.7
74	74	"Carlos se comunica con María Clara"	13 February 2020	10.8
75	75	"Martina La Peligrosa llega al Santa Rosa"	14 February 2020	11.0
76	76	"Mackenzie es el nuevo director del Santa Rosa"	17 February 2020	10.6
77	77	"Gloria es suspendida del hospital"	18 February 2020	10.9
78	78	"Carlos regresa a Bogotá"	19 February 2020	10.8
79	79	"María Clara y Carlos se reencuentran"	20 February 2020	10.4
80	80	"Helena se une al equipo del Santa Rosa"	21 February 2020	9.4
81	81	"Sol Angie le pide un tiempo a Héctor"	24 February 2020	10.7
82	82	"Un infiltrado en el hospital Santa Rosa"	25 February 2020	11.9
83	83	"Un nuevo director llega al Santa Rosa"	26 February 2020	11.6
84	84	"María Clara es retirada de su cargo"	27 February 2020	11.1
85	85	"María Clara besa a Carlos"	28 February 2020	11.4
86	86	"María Clara habla de sus sentimientos con Carlos"	2 March 2020	10.6
87	87	"Estafan a Héctor"	3 March 2020	10.9
88	88	"Garnica le hace una invitación a María Clara"	4 March 2020	10.5
89	89	"María Clara aceptar coordinar la jornada de vacunación"	5 March 2020	11.2
90	90	"Camilo le prepara una sorpresa a Eva"	6 March 2020	11.1
91	91	"El gesto de agradecimiento de Garnica con María Clara"	9 March 2020	12.1
92	92	"Garnica le hace una dura confesión a María Clara"	10 March 2020	11.4
93	93	"Helena asiste a la junta médica"	11 March 2020	12.4
94	94	"María Clara presenta su carta de renuncia"	12 March 2020	11.6
95	95	"Garnica le pide perdón a María Clara"	13 March 2020	11.8
96	96	"Carlos se le declara a María Clara"	16 March 2020	11.3
97	97	"Sol Angie y Héctor reciben la visita de la trabajadora social"	17 March 2020	11.2
98	98	"Carlos besa a María Clara"	18 March 2020	12.7
99	99	"Carlos se arrodilla y le hace una propuesta a María Clara"	19 March 2020	13.3
100	100	"Carlos termina su relación con Helena"	20 March 2020	12.7

=== Season 2 (2021–22) ===
No. overall	No. in season	Title	Original release date	Colombia viewers (Rating points)
Part 1
101	1	"Helena enfrenta a María Clara"	12 January 2021	7.8
102	2	"María Clara y Carlos están dispuestos a luchar por su amor"	13 January 2021	8.4
103	3	"A Carlos se le viene el mundo encima"	14 January 2021	7.4
104	4	"Álvaro confronta a Felipe"	15 January 2021	7.2
105	5	"Valentina conoce al hijo de Garnica"	18 January 2021	7.4
106	6	"Felipe cancela su matrimonio"	19 January 2021	8.3
107	7	"Mackenzie confronta a Álvaro y lo golpea"	20 January 2021	7.8
108	8	"Gloria es internada en el hospital"	21 January 2021	8.3
109	9	"Llegan nuevos retos a la vida de María Clara"	22 January 2021	7.3
110	10	"Garnica está a punto de descubrir el secreto de Helena y Gloria"	25 January 2021	7.8
111	11	"María Clara tendrá que definir su situación en el Santa Rosa"	26 January 2021	7.2
112	12	"María Clara toma una decisión que cambiará su vida"	27 January 2021	7.9
113	13	"María Clara sorprende a Carlos con una noticia"	28 January 2021	6.6
114	14	"Carlos y Helena tendrán que unirse para asumir un reto"	29 January 2021	7.0
115	15	"Helena se entera de una sorpresiva noticia"	1 February 2021	7.4
116	16	"Helena consuela a Carlos"	2 February 2021	6.9
117	17	"Helena le cuenta la verdad a Carlos"	3 February 2021	10.0
118	18	"Carlos le da una noticia a María Clara que le dejará con el corazón roto"	4 February 2021	9.4
119	19	"María Clara le da una oportunidad a Carlos"	5 February 2021	9.2
120	20	"Helena pasa un gran susto"	8 February 2021	8.9
121	21	"Helena busca llamar la atención de Carlos y finge estar mal de salud"	9 February 2021	8.9
122	22	"María Clara le hace una fuerte confesión a Carlos sobre Helena"	10 February 2021	9.2
123	23	"María Clara se enfrenta a un nuevo reto"	11 February 2021	9.6
124	24	"Gloria teme por la vida de su mamá"	12 February 2021	7.7
125	25	"La fuerte discusión entre María Clara y Carlos"	15 February 2021	10.1
126	26	"La angustiante situación que está viviendo Gloria"	16 February 2021	8.8
127	27	"Gloria se despide de su mamá"	17 February 2021	9.0
128	28	"El bello gesto que María Clara tiene con Gloria"	18 February 2021	8.4
129	29	"Helena provoca a María Clara"	19 February 2021	9.5
130	30	"Gloria atenta contra su vida"	22 February 2021	10.0
131	31	"La sorpresiva propuesta que Carlos le hace a María Clara"	23 February 2021	8.6
132	32	"Helena se entera de una noticia que la deja sin palabras"	24 February 2021	9.1
133	33	"Carlos y Helena se enteran del sexo de su bebé"	25 February 2021	8.6
134	34	"Garnica deja sin palabras a María Clara tras hacerle una confesión"	26 February 2021	9.2
135	35	"Helena y Carlos revelan el nombre de su hija"	1 March 2021	8.8
136	36	"Helena y Carlos reciben una noticia sobre su hija poco alentadora"	2 March 2021	9.6
137	37	"María Clara se entera de una triste noticia"	3 March 2021	10.1
138	38	"Garnica ofende a Carlos"	4 March 2021	10.1
139	39	"Helena se desmaya en los brazos de Carlos y María Clara"	5 March 2021	8.9
140	40	"María Clara le hace una advertencia a Andrés"	8 March 2021	9.1
141	41	"A Garnica se le viene el mundo encima"	9 March 2021	10.1
142	42	"María Clara se entera de una desconcertante noticia sobre Carlos y Helena"	10 March 2021	9.7
143	43	"Helena le hace una atrevida propuesta a Carlos"	11 March 2021	9.0
144	44	"Helena le pide a Carlos formar un hogar"	12 March 2021	10.0
145	45	"El consejo que Garnica le da a María Clara sobre Carlos"	15 March 2021	9.5
146	46	"Helena y Candelaria se enfrentan a un gran reto"	16 March 2021	9.2
147	47	"El resultado de la operación de Helena y Candelaria"	17 March 2021	9.4
148	48	"Helena se complica y debe ser operada de urgencias"	18 March 2021	9.8
149	49	"Garnica le confiesa a Carlos sus sentimientos hacía María Clara"	19 March 2021	8.4
150	50	"Garnica abre su corazón con María Clara y le confiesa la verdad"	23 March 2021	8.9
151	51	"La propuesta con la que Carlos sorprende a María Clara"	24 March 2021	9.9
152	52	"Victoria hace que María Clara y Carlos discutan"	25 March 2021	8.7
153	53	"Carlos y María Clara dan un gran paso en su relación"	26 March 2021	7.8
154	54	"Evelyn regresa al Santa Rosa"	29 March 2021	8.8
155	55	"Evelyn ataca a Victoria"	30 March 2021	8.8
156	56	"Se complica la situación de Carlos y María Clara en el Santa Rosa"	31 March 2021	9.8
157	57	"Garnica le da una gratificante noticia a María Clara"	5 April 2021	8.9
158	58	"María Clara tendrá que enfrentar una difícil situación"	6 April 2021	8.8
159	59	"María Clara vive un arduo momento"	7 April 2021	9.3
160	60	"Helena tiene una fuerte discusión con Victoria"	8 April 2021	9.3
161	61	"Victoria le pide a Helena aliarse en contra de María Clara"	9 April 2021	9.2
162	62	"Helena le confiesa la verdad de sus sentimientos a Carlos"	12 April 2021	10.7
163	63	"María Clara comienza a sentir molestias en su salud"	13 April 2021	9.6
164	64	"El gran temor al que se enfrenta María Clara"	14 April 2021	9.5
165	65	"La propuesta de María Clara que deja a Carlos sin palabras"	15 April 2021	9.7
166	66	"Helena sorprende a Carlos con una noticia"	16 April 2021	9.4
167	67	"Carlos deja sin palabras a María Clara tras hacerle una propuesta"	19 April 2021	9.2
168	68	"Carlos recibe una triste noticia sobre su hijo"	20 April 2021	9.1
169	69	"Carlos recibe una citación por parte del juzgado de familia"	21 April 2021	8.2
170	70	"Héctor tiene un grave accidente"	22 April 2021	9.2
171	71	"El Santa Rosa se entera de una lamentable noticia"	23 April 2021	9.9
172	72	"La dura decisión que toma el hijo de Héctor"	26 April 2021	8.0
173	73	"Carlos enfrenta un mal momento"	27 April 2021	8.5
174	74	"María Clara tiene una cita con Garnica"	28 April 2021	8.4
175	75	"María Clara toma cartas sobre el asunto y enfrenta a Valeriano"	29 April 2021	8.3
176	76	"Carlos queda preocupado luego de que Helena le hiciera una confesión"	30 April 2021	8.7
177	77	"María Clara toma la decisión de terminar su relación con Carlos"	3 May 2021	8.4
178	78	"María Clara y Carlos se dan otra oportunidad y viven un apasionado momento"	4 May 2021	8.5
179	79	"Valentina le cuenta la verdad a Camilo sobre su embarazo"	5 May 2021	9.3
180	80	"Carlos se entera del embarazo de Valentina"	6 May 2021	9.6
181	81	"Victoria le revela a María Clara que Valentina está embarazada"	7 May 2021	9.1
182	82	"María Clara enfrenta a Valentina"	10 May 2021	9.2
183	83	"Carlos llega a su límite y le deja las cosas claras a María Clara"	11 May 2021	9.1
184	84	"El juez determina quién se queda con la custodia de Simón"	12 May 2021	9.4
185	85	"La conmovedora promesa que Carlos le hace a Simón"	13 May 2021	9.4
186	86	"María Clara y Carlos se reconcilian y viven un momento muy especial"	14 May 2021	8.6
187	87	"Carlos y María Clara tienen una tensionante conversación"	18 May 2021	8.5
188	88	"La decisión que le cambiará la vida a Valentina y a Andrés"	19 May 2021	8.7
189	89	"Lanzan fuertes acusaciones contra Carlos"	20 May 2021	9.2
190	90	"Valentina vive un desafortunado momento"	21 May 2021	9.4
191	91	"Carlos es retirado del Santa Rosa"	24 May 2021	8.7
192	92	"Carlos toma la decisión de ponerle fin a su relación con María Clara"	25 May 2021	8.7
193	93	"Carlos llega al Santa Rosa y se lleva una gran sorpresa"	26 May 2021	9.4
194	94	"La junta toma una decisión que a pocos les agradará"	27 May 2021	9.5
195	95	"Garnica sorprende a María Clara con una revelación"	28 May 2021	8.8
196	96	"María Clara decide darle una oportunidad a Garnica"	31 May 2021	9.5
197	97	"Carlos se entera de la relación de María Clara y Garnica"	1 June 2021	8.7
198	98	"Los primeros acercamientos entre Carlos y Andrea"	2 June 2021	8.9
199	99	"Carlos sorprende a Garnica con una revelación"	3 June 2021	7.3
200	100	"Carlos ve la luz al final del túnel"	4 June 2021	8.4
201	101	"Helena le da una noticia a Carlos que lo sacará de sus casillas"	8 June 2021	9.0
202	102	"El gesto de agradecimiento que María Clara tiene con Helena"	9 June 2021	8.7
203	103	"Andrea y Carlos no pueden ocultar sus sentimientos"	10 June 2021	9.6
204	104	"La confesión que Carlos le hace a María Clara"	11 June 2021	8.3
205	105	"Una despedida melancólica"	15 June 2021	8.2
206	106	"Carlos recibe una inesperada visita"	16 June 2021	8.9
207	107	"Carlos le aclara sus sentimientos a Andrea"	17 June 2021	9.1
208	108	"Garnica y María Clara se dejan llevar por la pasión"	18 June 2021	9.2
209	109	"A Carlos le vuelve el alma al cuerpo"	21 June 2021	9.6
210	110	"En el Santa Rosa se viven momentos de tensión y angustia"	22 June 2021	9.5
211	111	"Un nuevo acercamiento entre María Clara y Carlos"	23 June 2021	10.5
212	112	"Carlos toma una decisión drástica con María Clara"	24 June 2021	8.6
213	113	"Carlos enfrenta un duro momento"	25 June 2021	7.7
214	114	"La vida de Carlos tomará un giro inesperado"	28 June 2021	8.3
215	115	"Carlos recibe una dolorosa noticia"	29 June 2021	8.3
216	116	"Carlos enfrenta una gran pérdida"	30 June 2021	9.3
217	117	"Álvaro recibe una sorpresiva visita"	1 July 2021	8.4
218	118	"Felipe enfrenta una difícil situación"	2 July 2021	8.2
219	119	"A Álvaro se le agota la paciencia"	7 July 2021	8.6
220	120	"María Clara sorprende a Garnica con una tentadora propuesta"	8 July 2021	8.4
221	121	"La inesperada confesión que María Clara le hace a Carlos"	9 July 2021	8.9
222	122	"María Clara tiene un golpe de suerte"	12 July 2021	8.4
223	123	"Donde hubo fuego, cenizas quedan"	13 July 2021	8.3
224	124	"María Clara se entera que de Carlos y Andrea planean tener un hijo"	14 July 2021	8.1
225	125	"Suenan campanas de boda"	15 July 2021	7.6
226	126	"La propuesta de Garnica que quedó en véremos"	16 July 2021	8.3
227	127	"María Clara y Carlos les son infieles a sus parejas"	19 July 2021	7.9
228	128	"Carlos se sincera con Andrea y le cuenta lo ocurrido con María Clara"	21 July 2021	8.5
229	129	"Carlos le hace una amorosa revelación a María Clara"	22 July 2021	8.8
230	130	"María Clara le confiesa a Garnica que le falló"	23 July 2021	8.2
231	131	"Garnica golpea fuertemente a Carlos"	26 July 2021	8.2
232	132	"María Clara le pide perdón a Andrea"	27 July 2021	9.2
233	133	"A Carlos se le hace difícil sacarse de la cabeza a María Clara"	28 July 2021	8.4
234	134	"María Clara enfrenta una difícil situación con su hijo"	29 July 2021	8.3
235	135	"María Clara acepta una propuesta de Garnica que le cambiará la vida"	30 July 2021	8.5
236	136	"María Clara renuncia al Santa Rosa"	2 August 2021	9.2
237	137	"Carlos le da la noticia a María Clara de que se irá con ella para Nueva York"	3 August 2021	8.6
238	138	"El enternecedor momento entre Carlos y María Clara"	4 August 2021	8.6
239	139	"Sol Angie y Danilo dan el sí y emprende una aventura"	5 August 2021	8.6
240	140	"María Clara vuelve a Colombia y sorprende a Carlos"	6 August 2021	8.4
241	141	"María Clara recibe una interesante propuesta"	9 August 2021	9.8
242	142	"María Clara acepta un gran reto"	10 August 2021	8.7
243	143	"La anhelada boda de María Clara y Carlos"	11 August 2021	8.9
244	144	"María Clara acepta una propuesta que le cambiará la vida"	12 August 2021	8.5
245	145	"Félix sorprende a Gloria con una inesperada propuesta"	13 August 2021	7.5
246	146	"Gloria acepta una propuesta de Félix"	17 August 2021	7.9
247	147	"Gloria vuelve al Santa Rosa"	18 August 2021	8.5
248	148	"Félix llega pisando fuerte al Santa Rosa"	19 August 2021	7.4
249	149	"Félix y María Clara tienen un inconveniente"	20 August 2021	6.9
250	150	"Las tensiones entre Félix y Carlos siguen subiendo"	23 August 2021	7.4
251	151	"María Clara rechaza el proyecto de Félix"	24 August 2021	8.1
252	152	"Lanzan fuertes acusaciones en contra de María Clara"	25 August 2021	7.9
253	153	"María Clara en el ojo del huracán"	26 August 2021	7.6
254	154	"Inés le confiesa una triste verdad a María Clara"	27 August 2021	7.0
255	155	"Manuela se encuentra con una escena que la saca de las casillas"	30 August 2021	8.1
256	156	"El panorama en el Santa Rosa no pinta bien"	31 August 2021	7.7
257	157	"El matrimonio de Sol Angie está en la cuerda floja"	1 September 2021	7.8
258	158	"Sol Angie recibe una desgarradora noticia"	2 September 2021	8.4
259	159	"María Clara deja de una sola pieza a Carlos"	3 September 2021	7.5
260	160	"Una luz de esperanza para Sol y Danilo"	6 September 2021	8.1
261	161	"Una noche llena de romanticismo"	7 September 2021	8.0
262	162	"Carlos sufre un percance de salud"	8 September 2021	8.6
263	163	"Nicolás le confiesa sus sentimientos a Manuela"	9 September 2021	7.9
264	164	"Manuela y Nicolás se besan"	10 September 2021	6.7
265	165	"María Clara recibe una propuesta que no podrá rechazar"	14 September 2021	6.4
266	166	"Félix mueve sus cartas a su conveniencia"	15 September 2021	6.4
267	167	"La vida de Camilo corre peligro"	16 September 2021	6.3
268	168	"María Clara y Carlos rescatan a Camilo"	17 September 2021	5.3
269	169	"Un sorpresivo regreso"	20 September 2021	7.2
270	170	"Álvaro se vuelve a encontrar con Felipe"	21 September 2021	7.0
271	171	"Un tensionante momento en el Santa Rosa"	22 September 2021	6.5
272	172	"Carlos no soporta la actitud de Félix"	23 September 2021	7.1
273	173	"Carlos recibe una angustiante noticia sobre María Clara"	24 September 2021	5.4
274	174	"A Carlos se le derrumba el mundo"	27 September 2021	5.9
275	175	"Carlos arriesga su vida por amor y encuentra a María Clara"	28 September 2021	6.1
276	176	"María Clara y Carlos tratan de salvar una vida"	29 September 2021	6.4
277	177	"Félix le da la cara a María Clara"	30 September 2021	5.6
278	178	"Félix se enfrenta a un gran reto"	1 October 2021	4.8
279	179	"Álvaro y Fernando reciben una grata visita"	4 October 2021	5.8
280	180	"Álvaro recibe una noticia que lo deja con el corazón triturado"	5 October 2021	5.7
281	181	"Gloria se entera de una cruel verdad"	6 October 2021	5.3
282	182	"Sara se une con Luisa Fernanda W y Pipe para darle una sorpresa a su mamá"	7 October 2021	6.2
283	183	"Luz Marina recibe un diagnóstico poco alentador"	8 October 2021	5.2
284	184	"Carlos y Félix se enfrentan a un gran reto"	11 October 2021	5.9
285	185	"Una gran sorpresa para Gloria y Félix"	12 October 2021	5.7
286	186	"Álvaro y su familia enfrentan una gran pérdida"	13 October 2021	5.4
287	187	"Álvaro le hace un fuerte reclamo a Fernando"	14 October 2021	5.7
288	188	"Gloria y Félix dan el sí en el altar"	15 October 2021	5.4
289	189	"Félix cae en cuenta de sus errores"	19 October 2021	5.8
290	190	"Gloria descubre el gran secreto de Félix"	20 October 2021	6.2
291	191	"Sol Angie le abre las puertas de su casa a Gloria"	21 October 2021	6.8
292	192	"Félix le da una sorpresa a Gloria"	22 October 2021	5.9
293	193	"Gloria acepta una gran propuesta de María Clara"	25 October 2021	6.0
294	194	"El duro comportamiento de Félix con Gloria"	26 October 2021	4.8
295	195	"María Clara deja de una sola pieza a Carlos"	27 October 2021	5.8
296	196	"La oportunidad que María Clara no podrá rechazar"	28 October 2021	4.9
297	197	"Carlos le cuenta a María Clara una impactante verdad sobre Camilo"	29 October 2021	4.0
298	198	"María Clara se lleva una gran desilusión"	2 November 2021	N/A
299	199	"La melancólica despedida de María Clara"	3 November 2021	4.4
300	200	"Los planes de Félix y Jaime quedan al descubierto"	4 November 2021	5.0
301	201	"Félix, el nuevo director del Santa Rosa"	5 November 2021	4.6
302	202	"Mackenzie vive un angustiante momento"	8 November 2021	4.7
303	203	"Félix y Carlos tienen una fuerte discusión"	9 November 2021	4.6
304	204	"El ambiente en el Santa Rosa se tensiona"	10 November 2021	N/A
305	205	"La tentadora propuesta que Gloria le hace a Nicolás"	11 November 2021	N/A
306	206	"Félix acaba con la ilusión de Sol Angie"	12 November 2021	4.6
307	207	"Carlos utiliza sus armas en contra de Félix"	16 November 2021	5.1
308	208	"Félix acepta la tentadora propuesta de Carlos"	17 November 2021	4.9
309	209	"El lado nunca antes visto de Félix"	18 November 2021	5.2
310	210	"Reynaldo confiesa que cometió un gran error"	19 November 2021	5.0
311	211	"Gloria recibe noticias poco alentadoras sobre la posibilidad de ser mamá"	22 November 2021	4.8
312	212	"La distancia pondrá en peligro la relación de Carlos y María Clara"	23 November 2021	5.1
313	213	"La atrevida decisión que Katy toma con Carlos"	24 November 2021	4.7
314	214	"Gloria confiesa que aún está interesada en Félix"	25 November 2021	4.8
315	215	"María Clara le da una noticia a Carlos que le cambiará la vida"	26 November 2021	4.4
316	216	"María Clara y Carlos a punto de dar una dulce noticia"	29 November 2021	4.6
317	217	"Félix le reclama a Gloria por su cercanía con Nicolás"	30 November 2021	4.7
318	218	"Álvaro y Félix tienen un fuerte enfrentamiento"	1 December 2021	N/A
319	219	"Gloria y Castro se vuelven a ver"	2 December 2021	N/A
320	220	"Félix se entera que Castro está de vuelta"	3 December 2021	N/A
321	221	"María Clara sorprende a Carlos con su regreso al país"	6 December 2021	4.4
322	222	"Camilo y Sol se enteran del embarazo de María Clara"	7 December 2021	N/A
323	223	"Manuel Castro a punto de salir de la cárcel"	9 December 2021	5.0
324	224	"Félix y Gloria le dan una nueva oportunidad a su amor"	10 December 2021	4.7
325	225	"Gloria resulta herida en medio de un atentado"	13 December 2021	4.9
326	226	"Guerra en la mira para ser el reemplazo de Carlos en el Santa Rosa"	14 December 2021	4.8
327	227	"Félix vuelve al Santa Rosa y está en el ojo del huracán"	15 December 2021	N/A
328	228	"Sol Angie descubre a Danilo y a Renata besándose"	16 December 2021	N/A
329	229	"Renata pretende arreglar el daño que le causó a Sol Angie"	17 December 2021	N/A
330	230	"Reynaldo le hace una dura confesión a Eva"	17 January 2022	N/A
331	231	"Julio tendrá que enfrentar una realidad"	18 January 2022	N/A
332	232	"Una relación llega a su fin"	19 January 2022	N/A
333	233	"Carlos toma una decisión definitiva"	20 January 2022	N/A
334	234	"Mackenzie sorprende a Amanda con una propuesta"	21 January 2022	N/A
Part 2
335	235	"Juan Pablo queda flechado al ver a Alex"	24 January 2022	N/A
336	236	"Manuela descubre un desgarrador secreto sobre Diego"	25 January 2022	4.6
337	237	"Carlos le dice adiós al Santa Rosa"	26 January 2022	4.8
338	238	"Félix pone a competir a Alex y Juan Pablo por el cargo de enfermería"	27 January 2022	4.0
339	239	"Carlos preocupa al dar una noticia sobre María Clara"	28 January 2022	3.5
340	240	"Helena regresa al Santa Rosa"	31 January 2022	4.0
341	241	"Helena revela la grave razón de su regreso"	1 February 2022	4.3
342	242	"Jaime Guerra es el nuevo director científico del Santa Rosa"	2 February 2022	3.7
343	243	"Reynaldo se vuelve aliado de Jaime Guerra"	3 February 2022	3.6
344	244	"Félix se acerca a Alex de una forma especial"	4 February 2022	4.4
345	245	"Álex tiene una fuerte discusión con su hijo"	7 February 2022	2.6
346	246	"Helena quiere descubrir la verdad del proyecto del Vaupés"	8 February 2022	3.1
347	247	"Guerra invita a salir a la doctora Prieto"	9 February 2022	3.1
348	248	"Álex le hace escena de celos a Félix"	10 February 2022	2.6
349	249	"Lucas le da una gran sorpresa a Álex"	11 February 2022	2.8
350	250	"Félix deja claros sus sentimientos hacia Kathy"	14 February 2022	3.0
351	251	"Félix suspende al jefe Álvaro"	15 February 2022	2.6
352	252	"La situación de Álvaro se complica"	16 February 2022	2.5
353	253	"Lucas se siente traicionado por Álex"	17 February 2022	3.3
354	254	"La Fiscalía detiene a Álvaro"	18 February 2022	2.9
355	255	"Álex se desahoga con Félix"	21 February 2022	1.9
356	256	"Álex y Félix tienen un comprometedor acercamiento"	22 February 2022	N/A
357	257	"Álex recibe una noticia desgarradora"	23 February 2022	3.4
358	258	"Los suecos se enteran de los inconvenientes de su proyecto"	24 February 2022	3.6
359	259	"Helena intercede por Álvaro ante los suecos"	25 February 2022	3.7
360	260	"Kathy se mete en problemas"	28 February 2022	N/A
361	261	"Lucas se arrepiente de como trató a su mamá"	1 March 2022	N/A
362	262	"Félix acompaña a Álex en un momento difícil"	2 March 2022	N/A
363	263	"Juan Pablo se desilusiona por respuesta de Álex"	3 March 2022	N/A
364	264	"Sol le da una buena noticia a Álvaro"	4 March 2022	N/A
365	265	"Amanda se entera de su embarazo"	7 March 2022	N/A
366	266	"Félix intercede por Álex ante Lucas"	10 March 2022	N/A
367	267	"Amanda podría perder a su bebé"	11 March 2022	N/A
368	268	"Kathy le hace una grave advertencia a Álex"	14 March 2022	N/A
369	269	"El doctor Guerra vuelve al hospital"	15 March 2022	N/A
370	270	"Jaime apoya la versión de Álvaro"	16 March 2022	N/A
371	271	"La fiscalía insiste en hablar con Guerra"	17 March 2022	N/A
372	272	"Félix le abre su corazón a Álex"	18 March 2022	N/A
373	273	"Lucas insiste en buscar a sus papás biológicos"	22 March 2022	N/A
374	274	"Félix y Kathy tienen una fuerte discusión"	23 March 2022	N/A
375	275	"Álex le deja las cosas claras a Juan Pablo"	23 May 2022	N/A
376	276	"Juan Pablo recibe una propuesta inesperada"	24 May 2022	N/A
377	277	"Jaime Guerra ha decidido contar toda la verdad"	25 May 2022	N/A
378	278	"Jaime Guerra quiere ver a Helena"	26 May 2022	N/A
379	279	"Álex le abre su corazón al doctor Félix"	27 May 2022	N/A
380	280	"Juan Pablo se siente mal por su vida amorosa"	31 May 2022	N/A
381	281	"Helena rechaza a Jaime Guerra"	1 June 2022	N/A
382	282	"Félix está en graves problemas"	2 June 2022	N/A
383	283	"Félix logra comprobar su inocencia"	3 June 2022	N/A
384	284	"Kathy llega muy mal herida al Hospital Santa Rosa"	6 June 2022	N/A
385	285	"Kathy trata de seguir adelante"	7 June 2022	N/A
386	286	"Félix le pide a Kathy que diga la verdad"	8 June 2022	N/A
387	287	"Álvaro no quiere seguir en el Hospital Santa Rosa"	9 June 2022	N/A
388	288	"El Hospital Santa Rosa está en venta"	10 June 2022	N/A
389	289	"La venta del Hospital Santa Rosa se complica"	13 June 2022	N/A
390	290	"Álvaro interroga a un paciente muy misterioso"	14 June 2022	N/A
391	291	"Juan Pablo y Álex se acercan un poco más"	15 June 2022	N/A
392	292	"La venta del Hospital Santa Rosa ya es un hecho"	16 June 2022	N/A
393	293	"Álvaro se siente muy nervioso"	17 June 2022	N/A
394	294	"Álvaro presentó el examen"	21 June 2022	N/A
395	295	"Juan Pablo deja plantada a la jefe Álex"	22 June 2022	N/A
396	296	"El Hospital Santa Rosa es intervenido por la Fiscalía"	23 June 2022	N/A
397	297	"Aníbal Serrano administrará el Hospital Santa Rosa"	24 June 2022	N/A
398	298	"Helena se siente derrotada"	28 June 2022	N/A
399	299	"Aníbal Serrano no tiene el control del Hospital Santa Rosa"	29 June 2022	N/A
400	300	"El personal médico del hospital hará respetar sus derechos"	30 June 2022	N/A
401	301	"Aníbal llevará a cabo muchos despidos"	1 July 2022	N/A
402	302	"Juan Pablo es despedido"	5 July 2022	N/A
403	303	"César visita a Juan Pablo"	6 July 2022	N/A
404	304	"Álex y Juan Pablo le dan rienda suelta a sus sentimientos"	7 July 2022	N/A
405	305	"Álex pone en peligro su puesto de trabajo"	8 July 2022	N/A
406	306	"Reynaldo y Sandra tienen una fuerte discusión"	11 July 2022	N/A
407	307	"Álvaro vive una situación complicada"	12 July 2022	N/A
408	308	"Helena está en problemas"	13 July 2022	N/A
409	309	"Álex no quiere perder a su hijo"	14 July 2022	N/A
410	310	"Helena tendrá que enfrentar su destino"	15 July 2022	N/A
411	311	"Álvaro y Fernando no quieren perder a Sarita"	18 July 2022	N/A
412	312	"César le cuenta toda la verdad a Juan Pablo"	19 July 2022	N/A
413	313	"Helena tiene una crisis existencial"	21 July 2022	N/A
414	314	"Álex se encuentra entre la espada y la pared"	22 July 2022	N/A
415	315	"Juan Pablo no se rendirá"	25 July 2022	N/A
416	316	"Álex tomará una difícil decisión"	26 July 2022	N/A
417	317	"Álvaro y Fernando extrañan a Sarita"	27 July 2022	N/A
418	318	"Álvaro sufre por la salud de su papá"	28 July 2022	N/A
419	319	"Álex recibe la visita de César"	29 July 2022	N/A
420	320	"César quiere reconquistar a la jefe Álex"	1 August 2022	N/A
421	321	"Álvaro está preocupado por el futuro de Sarita"	2 August 2022	N/A
422	322	"Juan Pablo se pasa de tragos"	3 August 2022	N/A
423	323	"César le propone matrimonio a la jefe Álex"	4 August 2022	N/A
424	324	"Helena y Reynaldo se acercan un poco más"	5 August 2022	N/A
425	325	"Helena y Reynaldo despiertan juntos"	8 August 2022	N/A
426	326	"César pelea con Juan Pablo"	9 August 2022	N/A
427	327	"Fernando tiene problemas de salud"	10 August 2022	N/A
428	328	"Fernando toma una difícil decisión"	11 August 2022	N/A
429	329	"Álex y Juan Pablo viven felices para siempre"	12 August 2022	N/A
