= Endry Cardeño =

Colombian actress (born 1976)

Endry Cardeño Zuluaga
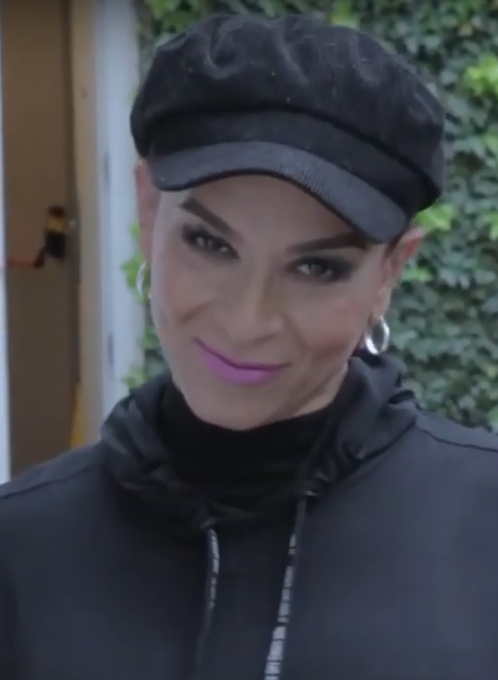
- Cardeño in 2019
- Born: May 17, 1976 (age 50); Cúcuta, Norte de Santander, Colombia

Endry Cardeño Zuluaga (born 17 May 1975) is a Colombian actress. In 2005 she became the first transgender actress to appear in a Colombian telenovela, starring as Laisa in Los Reyes. She appeared in the film Cheila (2009) and the television series Fugitivos (2015).

== Early life ==
Cardeño was born on 17 May 1975 in Cúcuta, Colombia. Her birth name was Hendri Iván. She began transitioning around the age of 17 when she started working and was able to buy her own clothes. In her youth, she worked at a hair salon, noting that the beauty industry was one of the few viable alternatives to sex work available to trans women in Colombia at the time.

== Career ==
She started her career by starring as Laisa in Los Reyes on 2005. She became first transgender actress in Colombian telenovela at that time. She auditioned for the role by sending an audition tape at the end of 2004 when she was still in Italy.

Cardeño migrated to Italy using forged Venezuelan documents, which she discarded upon arrival to avoid legal suspicion. Living as an undocumented immigrant, she faced xenophobia and resorted to sex work to survive. After being cast in Los Reyes, she needed to return to Colombia but lacked identification. To secure a flight home, she went to the Colombian consulate and acted the part of a vacationing stylist who had been robbed. Convinced by her story, officials issued her a deportee passport that allowed her to return to Colombia.

During her role as Laisa, she faced discrimination during her first day of filming when production preemptively hired a leg double. She was forced to surrender her wardrobe to the double and was threatened with termination by the producer.

== Award ==
In 2009, she won the Best Actress award at the Festival del Cine Venezolano for her starring role in Cheila. Then, on 2015, she won TVyNovelas Awards Colombia for Best Antagonist for her role in Fugitivos.
