= Şebnem Bozoklu =

Turkish actress (born 1979)

- Born: 25 August 1979 (age 46); Istanbul, Turkey
- Education: Kadıköy Girls High School; Dokuz Eylül University
- Occupation: Actress
- Years active: 2001–present
- Spouse(s): Emre İzer (m. 2010; div. 2016) Kanat Atkaya (m. 2019)
- Awards: 2009 Golden Butterfly Awards – Best Comedy Actress

Şebnem Bozoklu (born 25 August 1979) is a Turkish actress.

Her paternal family is from Isparta, while her maternal family is from Siirt and of Egyptian descent. Her family moved to Moda neighborhood in Istanbul and she spent most of her childhood in Kadıköy.

She graduated from Kadıköy Girls High School in 1996 and finished her education at the School of Fine Arts of Dokuz Eylül University in 2000. She started taking acting classes at Müjdat Gezen Art Center and finished her studies in 2004.

Between 2005 and 2006, she served as a director for the play Sanat Dansı ile Mondi' at Çisenti Theatre. Later, between 2006–2007 she worked as a presenter on TRT's program Hazır Mısınız?. During the same period, she worked on another TRT program called Elma Kurdu as a soloist and puppeteer.

Bozoklu's breakthrough came with her 45 year-old role in Canım Ailem as Meliha, for which she received a Golden Butterfly Award as Best Comedy Actress in 2009. In 2010, she was awarded at Radio-Television Journalists Association Oscars as Best Actress. Her other popular series are comedy crime Ulan İstanbul. She played in crime drama series Şahsiyet which won International Emmy Award.

== Filmography ==
Television
Year	Title	Role	Network
2006	Selena	Ceylan	ATV
2008–2010	Canım Ailem	Meliha	ATV
2011	Bizim Yenge	Filiz	Kanal D
2013	Galip Derviş	Sevin Sezgin	Kanal D
2014–2015	Ulan İstanbul	Yaren	Kanal D
2016	Altınsoylar	Gülsüm Altınsoy	Kanal D
2016	Çifte Saadet	Perihan	FOX
2020	Gel Dese Aşk	Yasemin Düdenli	ATV
2020–2021	Babam Çok Değişti	Aslı Pamuk	Kanal D
2021	Elbet Bir Gün	Nesime Baykan	FOX
2023	Hayatımın Neşesi	Neşe	TRT 1
2024-2025	Kızılcık Şerbeti	Meri (Meryem)	Show TV
2025-	Ruya Gibi	Fiko	Show TV
Streaming series and films
Year	Title	Role	Network
2018	Şahsiyet	Zuhal Çelik	puhutv, Disney+
2021	Bunu Bi' Düsüsün	Ayfer	BluTV
2021	Hamlet	Nagehan Tan	GAİN
2022	Yılbaşı Gecesi	Didem	Disney+
Film
Year	Title	Role	
2013	Soğuk	Fincan	
2015	İçimdeki İnsan	Nejla	
2015	Niyazi Gül Dörtnala	Hediye	
2015	Yok Artık!	Asuman	
2016	Albüm	Bahar Bahtiyaroğlu	
2016	Yok Artık 2	Merve	
2017	Tatlım Tatlım	Tatlım	
2018	Cebimdeki Yabancı	Esra	
2019	Türk İşi Dondurma	Gülsüm	
2020	Biz Böyleyiz	Dolunay	
2020	9,75	Sevgi	
2023	Prestij Meselesi	Jale	
2023	Mucize Aynalar	Emel Cenabettin	
2024	Gelin Takımı	Selin	

== Theatre ==
- Aşk Geçmişim, Uniq Hall, 2019
- A Streetcar Named Desire, BKM & ID Communications, 2017
- Kaplan Sarılması, Toy Istanbul, 2016
- Bezirgan, Istanbul People's Theatre, 2012
- Festen/Kutlama, DOT Theatre, 2011

== As assistant director ==
- TiyatroKare, İki Oda Bir Sinan (2005–2006)
- İstanbul City Theatre, Ben Anadolu (2003–2004)

== Awards ==
- 14th Kemal Sunal Culture and Art Week Awards, Best Stage Actress, (A Streetcar Named Desire), 2019
- Istanbul Kültür University Awards, Most Admired Stage Actress of the Year, (A Streetcar Named Desire), 2018
- Harbiye Leo Club Awards, Best Stage Actress (A Street Named Desire), 2018
- Sadri Alışık Awards, Most Successful Actress of the Year (Comedy) (Albüm)
- 2009 Golden Butterfly Awards - Best Comedy Actress
