= Gülperi =

Turkish television series

- Genre: Drama
- Starring: Ezgi Gör; Nurgül Yeşilçay; Timuçin Esen; Ece Sükan; Burak Dakak; Tarık Papuçcuoğlu; Aleyna Özgeçen; Emir Özyakışır; Onur Bilge
- Country of origin: Turkey
- Original language: Turkish
- No. of seasons: 1
- No. of episodes: 30

Production
- Producers: Timur Savcı; Burak Sağyaşar
- Production companies: TIMS & B Productions

Original release
- Network: Show TV
- Release: September 15, 2018 – May 3, 2019

Gülperi is a Turkish drama television series, produced by TIMS & B Productions and directed by Metin Balekoğlu, the series is inspired by the 1982 Turkish film Gülsüm Ana, starring Fatma Girik. it was aired for the first time on September 15, 2018, on Show TV, starring Ezgi Gör, Nurgül Yeşilçay, Timuçin Esen, Tarık Papuçcuoğlu, Ece Sükan, Burak Dakak, Aleyna Özgeçen, Emir Özyakışır and Onur Bilge, the last episodes was aired on May 3, 2019.

== Plot ==
Gülperi receives the news that her husband Eyüp has died on a business trip. From then on, her life will become extremely difficult as she and her three children, Hasan, Bedriye, Can, move into her father-in-law and family's mansion. In that place, her husband's brother is obsessed with her, he tries to abuse her, but she defends herself by hurting him with scissors. For this reason, Gülperi is sentenced to almost two years in prison. When she completes her sentence in prison, she returns to the mansion to recover her children, who left her husband's family in custody. With the help of Kadir Aydin, her lawyer and first love, she will try to regain the love and custody of her children.

== Cast ==
Actor	Role	Episodes.
Nurgül Yeşilçay	Gulperi Cetin	1-30
Timuçin Esen	Kadir Aydin	1-30
Tarik Papuççuoğlu	Yakup Agha	1-30
Ece Sükan	Şeyma	1-30
Burak Dakak	Hasan	1-30
Aleyna Özgeçen	Bedriye	1-30
Emir Özyakışır	Can	1-30
Onur Bilge	Ejder	1-30
Sefika Umit Tolun	Fatma	1-30
Gülçin Kültür Şahin	Kader	1-30
Emir Cubukcu	Ali	1-30
Ezgi Gör	Artemis	1-30
Haluk Cömert	Süleyman	1-30
Sureyya Kilimci	Suna	1-30
Intuition Deniz	Ezgi	1-30
Kayra Zabcı	Gülperi (as a young)	1-30
Batuhan Sert	Kadir (as a young)	1-30
Hafsanur Sancaktutan	Fidan	1-30
Zeynep Guldoğan	Songül	1-30
Necati Kutlu	Armağan	1-30
Gülperi Buycu	Tuğçe	1-30
Nilufer Camci	Azamet	1-30
Can İlhan	Atakan	1-30
Lale Cangal	Nesli	1-30
Cute Ergüven Hamşioğlu	Hacer	1-30
Ayda Aksel	Ayten	1-30
Enes Demirkapi	Gökhan	1-30
İrem Kahyaoğlu	Ajda Adakli	1-30
Furkan Oğulcan İlker	Serdar	2-30
Ejder Ozkaslıgil	Salih	2-30
Rabia Soytürk	Selen	8-30

== Series overview ==
Season	No. of episodes	Start of the Season	End of the Season	Episodes	TV Channel
1	30	September 15, 2018	May 3, 2019	1 - 30	Show TV
