= Şahsiyet =

Crime drama TV series

- Genre: Crime drama, mystery
- Written by: Hakan Günday
- Directed by: Onur Saylak
- Starring: Haluk Bilginer; Cansu Dere; Hüseyin Avni Danyal; Metin Akdülger; Şebnem Bozoklu; Necip Memili; Müjde Ar
- Theme music composer: Sertaç Özgümüş; Güntaç Özdemir
- Country of origin: Turkey
- Original language: Turkish
- No. of episodes: 22

Production
- Producers: Kerem Catay & Pelin distas
- Production locations: Istanbul; Gölyazı
- Cinematography: Feza Çaldıran
- Running time: 52-96 minutes
- Production company: Ay Yapım

Original release
- Network: puhutv Show tv (2018); GAIN (2023)
- Release: 17 March 2018 – 7 January 2024

Şahsiyet (transl. Persona) is a 2018 Turkish crime drama television series written by Hakan Günday and directed by Onur Saylak. The first season of the series premiered on 17 March 2018 and was broadcast by puhutv. The second season started on 13 November 2023 and was broadcast by Turkish digital video and TV network GAİN.

== Plot summary ==
Agâh Beyoğlu is a 65-year-old retired court clerk whose spouse died some time ago. Agâh lives alone in an old Ottoman building bearing the name of his deceased spouse, Mebrure, in Beyoğlu. One day, his beloved cat Münir Bey dies, since Agâh forgets to feed him. After the incident, he goes to a doctor to figure out the reasons of his memory impairment and there he is diagnosed with Alzheimer's disease. Agâh can't accept the fact that he has Alzheimer's disease and becomes depressed. One day, when Agâh meets his friends at an invitation, he discerns some advantages of his disease and makes a decision which is a turning point.

Nevra Elmas is a young and idealistic police-officer working in Istanbul Police Headquarters. She is the only female personnel in the Homicide Department but due to her gender, she experiences mobbing by her male co-workers, especially by misogynist Firuz. Her workmates believe that she does not deserve her position in the department and that her assignment is purely and simply due to benevolent sexism.

A serial-killer wearing a cat costume shows up in Istanbul. There is a common ground between the victims, Nevra Elmas, and Agâh Beyoğlu: Kambura, a small and conservative district near to Istanbul.

== Cast ==
Actor name	Character's name
Haluk Bilginer	Agâh Beyoğlu
Cansu Dere	Nevra Elmas
Metin Akdülger	Ateş Arbay
Şebnem Bozoklu	Zuhal Beyoğlu
Hüseyin Avni Danyal	Cemil Havran
Necip Memili	Tolga
Şenay Gürler	Nükhet
Ayhan Kavas	Gürkan
Önder Selen	Mümtaz
Ibrahim Selim	Sefa
Fırat Topkorur	Firuz
Recep Usta	Deva
Rabia Soytürk	Süveyda
Alptekin Ertürk	Selim
Müjde Ar	Nesrin
Yusufcan Sancaklı	Polis
Hümeyra	Feza Yurtgil
Volkan Uygun	Vural
Avni Yalçın	Mehmet Yurtgil
Okan Avcı	Tufan
Cengiz Samsun	Rüstem
Ömer Çobanoğlu	Bedir
Can İlhan	Afşin
Bekir Hakan Uyanık	Başkomiser
Ali Seçkiner Alıcı	Naim Türedi
Erkan Ayan	Sadi
Turhan Kaya	Yüksel
Naz Karaca	Reyhan

== Reception ==
Writing for Vatan, Oya Doğan criticized the length of the first episode, adding that it "was too long [...] 85 percent of the first episode was telling who Agah Beyoğlu was". In her article, she mentions that the series initially followed the typical rules set out for web series but later became more like a television series. Sabah writer Ayşe Özyılmazel praised the production quality of the series and described it as "perhaps the best series in the history of Turkish series". In November 2018, Şahsiyet entered the top 40 of the IMDb's list of the top 250 TV shows of all time, and as of 2025 is on position 47 with an average rating of 9.0.

== Awards and nominations ==
Year	Award	Category	Recipients and nominees	Result	References
2018	EN Awards	Best Internet TV series of 2018	Şahsiyet	Won	
2019	SXSW Film Design Awards	Excellence in Title Design	Ethem Cem & Enes Özenbaş	Nominated	
2019	International Emmy Awards	Best Performance by an Actor	Haluk Bilginer	Won	
