= Rabia Soytürk =

Turkish actress (born 1999)

- Born: 26 January 1999 (age 27); Istanbul, Turkey
- Education: Sadri Alışık Cultural Center
- Occupations: Actress,Model
- Years active: 2018–present
- Height: 1.76 m (5 ft 9 in)

Rabia Soytürk (born 26 January 1999) is a Turkish actress and model.

== Life and career ==
Soytürk was born on 26 January 1996 in Istanbul. Originally from Trabzon, she graduated from the Health College's nursing department. Later, she studied acting at the Sadri Alışık Cultural Center. She made her debut in 2018 in the television series Gülperi. She then landed the lead role in the film Özgür Dünya in 2019. Between 2021 and 2022, she starred in the series Alparslan: Büyük Selçuklu. In 2023, Soytürk played the lead role in the series Veda Mektubu. In 2025, Rabia was approved for the lead female role in the TV series Teşkilat.

== Filmography ==
Television
Year	Title	Role	Network
2018–2019	Gülperi	Selen	Show TV
2019–2021	Benim Adım Melek	Defne Yıldırım	TRT 1
2021–2022	Alparslan: Büyük Selçuklu	Karaca Hatun	TRT 1
2022	Duy Beni	Ekim Güleryüz	Star TV
2023	Veda Mektubu	Aslı Yıldız	Kanal D
2024	Kör Nokta	Aslım Gencer	atv
2025	Teşkilat	Hilal Turhantürk	TRT 1
Streaming series and movies
Year	Title	Role	Platform
2018	Şahsiyet	Süveyda	puhutv
TBD	Aşk Sarmalı	Defne	Amazon Prime
TBD	Ölüm Bizi Ayırana Dek	Azra	TOD
Film
Year	Title	Role	Notes
2019	Özgür Dünya	Aslı	

== Awards and nominations ==
Year	Award	Category	Work	Reference	Result
2022	48th Golden Butterfly Awards	Best Actress	Duy Beni		Nominated
2022	48th Golden Butterfly Awards	Best TV Couple (with Caner Topçu)	Duy Beni		Nominated
