= Ulan İstanbul =

- Genre: Comedy, Drama
- Directed by: Murat Onbul
- Starring: Uğur Polat; Şebnem Bozoklu; Erkan Kolçak Köstendil; Sevtap Özaltun; Kaan Yıldırım; Caner Özyurtlu; Salih Bademci; Zeynep Kankonde; Beyti Engin; Zihni Göktay; Demet Gül; Ayta Sözeri; Emre Kınay; Gökhan Niğdeli; Bahadır Hakim; Gözde Türkpençe; Can Bartu Aslan; Alptekin Serdengeçti; Necip Memili; Bekhan Doğan; Gökhan Kıraç
- Country of origin: Turkey
- Original language: Turkish
- No. of seasons: 1
- No. of episodes: 39

Production
- Production company: D Productions

Original release
- Network: Kanal D
- Release: 23 June 2014 – 23 March 2015

Ulan İstanbul is a Turkish drama TV series that aired from 23 June 2014 to 23 March 2015 on the Kanal D network. The television finale aired on 9 February 2015, and its last six episodes were streamed on the internet.

== Plot ==
The TV series portrays a group of con-artists disguised as a well-established Istanbul family, the Nevizades. Firuz (Emre Kınay) loses one million Turkish Lira in a scam and blames Derya's father, Captain(Sevtap Özaltun), for his loss, resulting in Captain being imprisoned. This leads Kandemir (Uğur Polat), a member of the Nevizade family, and his five children to become con-artists, scamming "bad" people in order to raise money for Captain's release. The Nevizade family begins by moving to a historical street of Istanbul.

After the 29th episode of the series, the Nevizade family finally manages to collect one million Turkish Lira, enough to free Captain. However, unknown to them, one of their scams was recorded by a former family friend, Firuz. In lieu of being exposed by Firuz, the family is blackmailed into working for Firuz and continues to scam people.

== Characters ==
Actor	Character	Bio
Uğur Polat	Kandemir	The leader and father figure of the Navizade family.
Emre Kınay	Firuz	Kandemir's former friend and the Navizade family boss. After recording one of the scams perpetrated by the family, he betrays and blackmails Kandemir in order to get his crew to work for him.
Erkan Kolçak Köstendil	Karlos / Karlos The Jackal	An orphan at birth, Karlos escaped the orphanage he lived in when he was young. He was given the nickname 'Karlos The Jackal' after mastering the art of scamming in such a short period of time. He is an avid music lover as well as an equestrian fan. He dreams of one day establishing his own horse farm with his lover, Yaren.
Şebnem Bozoklu	Yaren	After facing persecution for her crimes, Yaren fled to Istanbul. She is funny and playful but has been known to be serious when it matters. She is in love with Karlos. She is Derya's best friend and a close friend with Ferdi.
Kaan Yıldırım	Ferdi	Like Karlos, Ferdi is an orphan. The smart and cunning member of the Nevizade family, Ferdi is an essential asset to the Nevizade crew. He slowly falls in love with Derya, even though in the beginning they were always arguing. He's Karlos' best friends and a close friend with Yaren.
Sevtap Özaltun	Derya	Daughter of Ali Riza, Derya went to Istanbul to study acting. However, her acting career was cut short when she faced persecution for her father's crimes. In order to clear their family name, Derya joined the Nevizade family. Derya starts falling deeply in love with Ferdi. She is also Yaren's best friend and a close friend with Karlos.
Salih Bademci	Ceyhun	Police officer, Derya's long-lasted fiancé.
Caner Özyurtlu	Bahadır	A computer genius and hacker, Bahadir excelled in all parts of his academic life. After graduating from College, Bahadir left his job in order to join the Nevizade family, whom he met online, and began scamming
Zeynep Kankonde	Şehriban	One of the Nevizade family's many neighbours.
Beyti Engin	Hayati	One of the Nevizade family's many neighbours. Unlike the others, he is suspicious of their activities and is constantly suspicious of them.
Zihni Göktay	Servet	One of the Nevizade family's many neighbours.
Demet Gül	Maşuka	Kandemir's love interest.
Ayta Sözeri	Umay	Shan Li's wife. She spends most of her time with him running their Chinese restaurant.
Gökhan Niğdeli	Dulkadir	The chairperson of the neighborhood committee. He is one of the first people the Nevizade family meet upon their arrival.
Bahadır Hakim	Shan Li	A funny and honest owner of a local Chinese restaurant. He runs the restaurant with his wife, Umay.
Gözde Türkpençe	Esra	A successful police officer who is in love with Derya. His love for Derya proves to be paralyzing at a time, placing him in a position between his job and his love.
Can Bartu Aslan	Gıyasettin	A child known to help his father with scams. Known to be lazy, Giyasettin is always complaining about his life.
Alptekin Serdengeçti	Ali Rıza	A former sea hand and fisherman, Ali was convicted and taken to jail for a crime he did not commit. The one true love in his life is his daughter, Derya, to whom he is a compassionate and loving father.

== Release ==
The show started being broadcast on Kanal D and was released via Kanal D's web portal. After the 33rd episode, the show ended its television broadcasts and became web-only. The first web episode was aired on 16 February 2015 and was free to view, along with the second and third web episodes. The following episodes were paid-only. The show ended with the explanation that Turkish audiences were not yet ready to pay for content.

Season	Episodes	Originally aired		Network
Season	Episodes	First aired	Last aired	Network
1	33	23 June 2014	9 February 2015	Kanal D
1	6	16 February 2015	23 March 2015	web-only
