= Fugitivos =

- Genre: Drama
- Created by: Clara María Ochoa
- Written by: Said Chamie; Claudia Sánchez
- Directed by: Klych López
- Creative director: Gonzalo Martínez
- Starring: Emmanuel Esparza; Taliana Vargas
- Music by: Carlos Aguera
- Country of origin: Colombia
- Original language: Spanish
- No. of seasons: 1
- No. of episodes: 40

Production
- Executive producer: Ana Piñeres
- Producer: Clara María Ochoa
- Production locations: Bogotá, Ibagué, Salento, Ambalema, San Juan de Girón, Barichara and Tabio
- Cinematography: Andrés Gutiérrez
- Editor: Gersón Aguilar
- Camera setup: Multi-camera

Original release
- Network: Caracol Televisión
- Release: August 4 – October 3, 2014

Fugitivos is a Colombian drama television series that premiered on Caracol Televisión on August 4, 2014, and concluded on October 3, 2014. Created by Clara María Ochoa inspired on the 1997 Colombian telenovela La mujer del presidente, and produced by CMO Producciones and distributed by Caracol Internacional. The series is available in 4K Ultra-high-definition television. It stars Emmanuel Esparza and Taliana Vargas.

== Plot ==
Julián (Emmanuel Esparza) is an engineer who sees his life, his marriage and his work destroyed overnight, as he is blamed for a murder he did not commit. After being sentenced to 26 years in prison, he decides to escape to find the only witness who really knows who is the real culprit of the crime. However, in jail he meets Esperanza (Taliana Vargas) and in her he finds love again.

== Cast ==
- Emmanuel Esparza as Julián Duarte
- Taliana Vargas as Esperanza Gómez
- José Narváez as Ricardo Pradilla
- María José Martínez as Mariana Cárdenas
- Christian Tappan as Steve Houston
- Endry Cardeño as Vladimir Mendoza
- Jorge Soto as Carlos Alberto
- Marcela Agudelo as Patricia Rodríguez
- Alex Letón as Johnny Masson
- Mario Jurado as Hernán Sierra
- Alejandra Miranda as La Coyote
- Alma Rodríguez as Lorena Pineda
- Constanza Hernández as Maribel Pardo
- Juan Diego Sánchez as Sergio Caviedes
- Jóse Pedraza as Teniente Morales
- Alex Adames as Agente Torres
- Juan Esteban Aponte as Samuel Duarte
- Yuly Pedraza as Melba
- Dave Thomas as Plummer

== Rating ==
Season	Timeslot (CT)	Episodes	First aired		Last aired	
Season	Timeslot (CT)	Episodes	Date	Viewers (millions)	Date	Viewers (millions)
1	Mon–Fri 9:00pm	40	August 4, 2014	9.5	October 3, 2014	11.6

== Hindi version ==
Fugitivos is dubbed in Hindi language under the title "Faraar" and its available in parts/episodes on YouTube.
