= Yurdaer Okur =

Turkish actor

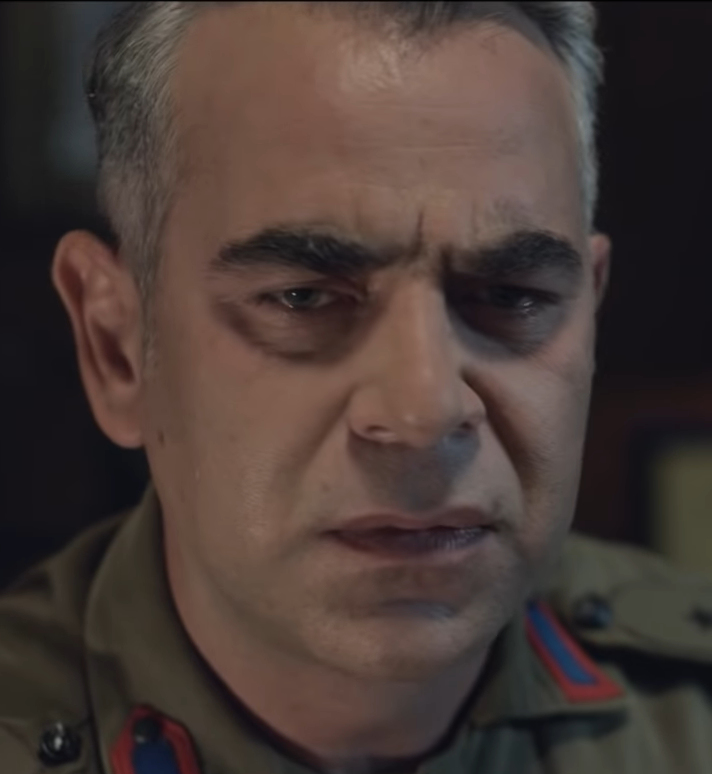
- Okur in a scene from 7. Koğuştaki Mucize (2019)
- Born: 29 October 1974 (age 50); Rize, Turkey
- Occupation: Actor
- Years active: 1999–present
- Spouse: Dilara Yalçın
- Children: 1

Yurdaer Okur (born 29 October 1974) is a Turkish film, television and stage actor.

== Life and career ==
Yurdaer Okur was born on 29 October 1974 in Rize. After finishing his high school in Bafra, he enrolled in Akdeniz University's tourism management program. After studying at this school for three years, he decided to change his major and in 1994 enrolled in Hacettepe University State Conservatory's theatre program. He later received his master's degree from Mimar Sinan Fine Arts University.

After being introduced to drama actor Genco Erkal in 1999, he joined the Dostlar Theatre and got a role in the play Barefoot in Athens. In the following year, he started working for the Istanbul State Theatre as a part-time actor. In 2002, he joined the cast of Diyarbakır State Theatre. Starting from 2000, he acted in and directed various plays for the Turkish State Theatres. He also taught drama and acting lessons in Diyarbakır. Alongside his career on stage, Okur soon began appearing in a number of movies and television series.

He had a recurring role in the Netflix original series Hakan: Muhafız. Okur was also among the cast of 7. Koğuştaki Mucize. In 2020, he starred in the historical drama series Kuruluş: Osman as Balgay. In the following year he began portraying Tuğrul Bozan in another historical drama, titled Alparslan: Büyük Selçuklu.

== Theatre ==
=== As actor ===
- Barefoot in Athens : Maxwell Anderson – Dostlar Theatre – 1999
- Spaghetti mit Ketchup : Rainer Hachfeld – Istanbul State Theatre – 2000
- The Beauty Queen of Leenane : Martin McDonagh – Istanbul State Theatre – 2000
- Ben Ruhi Bey Nasılım : Edip Cansever – Istanbul State Theatre – 2001
- Benerci Kendini Niçin Öldürdü : Nâzım Hikmet – Istanbul State Theatre – 2001
- Dünyanın Ortasında Bir Yer : Özen Yula – Diyarbakır State Theatre – 2003
- Hortulus : Plautus – Diyarbakır State Theatre – 2003
- Yaşar Ne Yaşar Ne Yaşamaz : Aziz Nesin – Diyarbakır State Theatre – 2004
- Así que pasen cinco años : Federico García Lorca – Tiyatro Oyunevi – 2006
- The Pillowman : Martin McDonagh – Talimhane Theatre – 2009
- Ölümü Yaşamak : Orhan Asena – Diyarbakır State Theatre – 2010
- Babamın Cesetleri : Berkun Oya – Krek – 2012
- Kuvâyi Milliye - Kurtuluş Savaşı Destanı : Nâzım Hikmet – 2014 – Tiyatro 2000
- The Pillowman : Martin McDonagh – 2016 – Entropi Sahne
- Ran : Nâzım Hikmet – 2017 – Entropi Sahne
- The Beauty Queen of Leenane : Martin McDonagh – 2018

=== As director ===
- Benim Güzel Pabuçlarım : Dersu Yavuz Altun – Diyarbakır State Theatre – 2004
- A Marriage Proposal : Anton Chekhov – Diyarbakır State Theatre – 2006
- Ich Feuerbach : Tankred Dorst – Trabzon State Theatre – 2011
- Mãos de Eurídice : Pedro Bloch – Ankara State Theatre – 2012
- Taziye : Murathan Mungan – Diyarbakır State Theatre – 2013–14
- Empty City : Dejan Dukovski – Entropi Sahne – 2017
- The Little Prince : Antoine de Saint-Exupéry – Entropi Sahne – 2019
- The Dumb Waiter : Harold Pinter – Entropi Sahne – 2019

== Filmography ==
Film
Year	Title	Role	Notes
2002	Sır Çocukları		
2005	Chemins d'O (Güneşin Doğuşu)	Güneş	Short film
2005	Gen	Dr. Ragıp	Leading role
2005	Kısık Ateşte 15 Dakika		
2011	Türkan	Commissioner Emin	
2011	Labirent	İsmet	
2018	Direniş Karatay	Baiju Noyan	Leading role
2018	Keşif	Bekir	
2019	7. Koğuştaki Mucize	Yarbay Aydın	
2019	Körler Pencereden Bakar mı?	Doctor	Short film, leading role
2020	Bilmemek	Sinan	Leading role
2020	Son Kale Hacıbey	Ahmet Paşa	Leading role
2023	Demir Kadın: Neslican	Doctor Nevzat	
2023	Kadınlara Mahsus	Metin Ünal	

Television
Year	Title	Role	Notes
1999	Ferhunde Hanımlar		
2000	Üzgünüm Leyla		
2000	Evdeki Yabancı		
2001	Çifte Bela		
2001	Tatlı Hayat		
2002	Aslı ile Kerem		
2002	Dadı	Journalist	Guest appearance
2005	Belalı Baldız	Demir	Guest appearance
2005	Aşk Oyunu	Hakan	
2006–2008	Köprü	Tekin	
2007	Kabuslar Evi: Çarşamba Karısı	Erdal	TV film
2010	Kılıç Günü	Mustafa Kiziroğlu	
2011–2012	Sakarya Fırat	Kerküklü Süleyman	
2012–2015	Karadayı	Turgut Akın	
2014	Reaksiyon	Gürkan	
2015–2016	Yeter	Yekta Harmanlı	Leading role
2016	Saruhan	Kadı	TV film, leading role
2018	Alija	Alija Izetbegović	Leading role
2019	Nöbet	Major Barış Kalender	Leading role
2019	Sevgili Geçmiş	Tekin Malik	Guest appearance
2020	Kuruluş: Osman	Balgay	
2020–2021	Kefaret	Ahmet Çınarlı	Leading role
2021–2022	Alparslan: Büyük Selçuklu	Tuğrul Bozan	
2022	Hakim	Azem Demirkıran	Leading role
2022, 2023	Yargı	Turgut Ali Duymaz	Guest appearance
2023-2024	Yabani	Serhan Soysalan	Leading role
2025	Piyasa	Şefik	Supporting role

Streaming series and films
Year	Title	Role	Notes
2018	Hakan: Muhafız	Kemal Erman	Netflix original series
2023	İyi Adamın 10 Günü	Arif	Netflix original film
TBA	#adaleTT	Selim	TRT Dijital series
