= La Pola (TV series) =

- Genre: Telenovela
- Story by: Juan Carlos Pérez Florez
- Directed by: Sergio Cabrera
- Creative directors: Rosario Lozano; Sofía Morales
- Starring: Carolina Ramírez; Ana María Estupiñán; Emmanuel Esparza; Pablo Espinosa; Luis Fernando Hoyos; Valentina Rendón; Juliana Galvis; Sebastián Martínez; Andoni Ferreño; Manuel Navarro; Zharick León; Laura Torres; José Sospedra; Joel Bosqued; Diego Trujillo; Marcela Agudelo; Héctor De Malba; María Elena Döehring; Luis Felipe Cortés; Ana Mosquera; Ana María Arango; Kepa Amuchastegui; Mariano Venancio; Ana Fernández
- Music by: Germán Arrieta
- Country of origin: Colombia
- Original language: Spanish
- No. of episodes: 200

Production
- Executive producer: Juan Carlos Perez Florez
- Producer: Carlos Lamus
- Production locations: Barichara, Santander, Colombia; Bogotá, Colombia; Villa de Leyva, Boyacá, Colombia

Original release
- Network: RCN Televisión
- Release: September 13, 2010 – July 27, 2011

La Pola is a Colombian drama telenovela based on historical facts and directed by Sergio Cabrera for RCN Televisión. The series tells the political and loving life of Policarpa Salavarrieta Ríos, a woman who became one of the most important figures in the history of the Independence of Colombia for preferring death instead of submission. The series originally aired from September 13, 2010, to July 27, 2011.

== Plot ==
The action of the telenovela is located in Viceroyalty of New Granada, early nineteenth century and the period of Colombian independence called Patria Boba, just before and after the cry of the Colombian Independence of the Spanish Empire on July 20, 1810, A strong crisis due to the French invasion by Napoleon. It was a time of definitions because it was realistic or patriotic. There is a struggle for the independence of the Spaniards and for trying to organize an army to defend the nascent country that is not yet called Colombia and freedom. A time of injustice.

Within this framework, a love story is depicted between La Pola and Alejo Sabaraín, a relationship that has drawn the attention of Colombians and historians. La Pola held libertarian and egalitarian ideals, opposing contemporary social hierarchies and male dominance that restricted women's public expression, and publicly spoke out against established social norms.

The series depicts a period in which love and social relationships were shaped by the restrictions of the colonial era. La Pola develops a passionate and troubled romance with Alejo Sabaraín, the son of a Spanish father and a creole mother. Their relationship is considered socially unacceptable due to differences in ancestry, colonial status, and Alejo's connection to the armies of the Spanish Crown. Despite these barriers, the couple attempts to maintain their relationship while facing the consequences of challenging the social order of the time.

== Cast ==
=== Main ===
- Carolina Ramírez as Pola Salavarrieta
  - Ana María Estupiñán as Young Pola Salavarrieta
- Emmanuel Esparza as Alejandro Sabbarain
  - Pablo Espinosa as Young Alejandro Sabbarain
- Luis Fernando Hoyos as Antonio Nariño
- Valentina Rendón as Magdalena Ortega de Nariño
- Juliana Galvis as Maria Ignacia de Valencia
- Sebastián Martínez as Jorge Tadeo Lozano
- Andoni Ferreño as Francisco Javier Sabaraín y San Vicente
- Manuel Navarro as Juan Sámano
- Zharick León as Catarina Salavarrieta
  - Laura Torres as Young Catarina Salavarrieta
- José Sospedra as Leandro Sabaraín
  - Joel Bosqued as Young Leandro Sabaraín
- Diego Trujillo as Domingo Garcia
- Marcela Agudelo as María Teresa Ramos de Sabaraín
- Héctor De Malba as Gaspar Alonso de Valencia
- María Elena Döehring as Eusebia Caicedo Santamaria de Valencia
- Luis Felipe Cortés as Juliano
- Ana Mosquera as Nicolasa
- Ana María Arango as Gertrudis
- Kepa Amuchastegui as Gobernador Miguel Tacón
- Mariano Venancio as Virrey Antonio Amar y Borbón
- Ana Fernández as Doña Francisca Villanova y Marco

=== Recurring ===
- Matilde Lemaitre as Young María Ignacia Valencia
- Greeicy Rendón as Sierva
- Carlos Humberto Camacho as Francisco José de Caldas
- Diego Cadavid as Ambrosio Almeida
- Elkin Díaz as José Antonio Galán
