= Juan Carlos Vásquez =

Juan Carlos Vasquez
- Vasquez performing in 2013

Background information
- Born: 14 September 1986 (age 39); Santiago de Cali, Colombia
- Occupations: Composer; sound artist
- Labels: Important, Ablaze
- Education: Aalto University; Sibelius Academy; Javeriana University; University of Virginia

Juan Carlos Vasquez (born 14 September 1986) is a Colombian composer and sound artist.

Vasquez has participated as a sonic artist, composer and/or performer in events in over 30 countries of the Americas, Asia, Europe and Oceania, including an acclaimed interactive installation for the Milan Furniture Fair reviewed as "one of the most eye-catching sights of the fair" by the Architects' Journal, while working as a sound director for a research project at the Pilot University of Colombia. In 2013 the Chelsea and Westminster Hospital in partnership with the Royal College of Music selected him as one of the winners for the "Rhapsody Composition Project", to write under commission the sonic counterpart for the sculpture "The Acrobat", by Allen Jones (sculptor) RA. The Grammy-winning American composer Eric Whitacre was linked to this project as ambassador

In 2014, the Sibelius Birth Town Foundation, Sibhack and the Ateneum Museum commissioned Vasquez to compose an electroacoustic rendition to Jean Sibelius' Romance Op. 24 No.9, as part of the official 150th anniversary of the Finnish composer's birth. The "Sibelius Collage" was premiered in October 2014 at the museum's Auditorium. In 2016, Vasquez received the award for "Excellence in Art, Design, and the Production of Sound" at the Hamburg University of Applied Sciences (HAW).

Later in 2023, Vasquez's game art project Ecstasy / Light / Inertia received international recognition and was featured by Finnish loudspeaker manufacturer Genelec. A year later, Vasquez was both a participant artist and curator of the exhibition Interwoven Existence at Ars Electronica, a festival renowned for its focus on art, technology, and society.

He earned his M.A. in New Media from Aalto University, graduating with the Dean’s Grant and recognition as the Primus Master. He also completed a Ph.D. at the University of Virginia, where he was awarded the Jefferson Fellowship, the university's premier graduate award.

Since January 2023, Vasquez has been serving as an assistant professor at Xi'an Jiaotong-Liverpool University.

His music has been featured on hour-long specials by leading radio art / electroacoustic music radio stations, such as Resonance FM (Clearspot – UK), BCB 106.6fm (The Sound Art Show – UK), Basic.FM and Radio Círculo (UNDAE – Spain). His music has been published by Important Records and Ablaze Records.

Other spaces supporting the diffusion of his work include the University of Oxford (Ashmolean LiveFriday 2017), Aalborg University (NIME 2017), Queensland Conservatorium (NIME 2016), HKU University of the Arts Utrecht (ICMC 2016), University of North Texas (ICMC 2015), New York University (SID 2015), University of Kent (Symposium of Acoustic Ecology), Wesleyan University (Society of Electro-Acoustic Music in the United States 2014 National Conference), The New York Public Library (Kinokophonography), Leeds College of Music (International Festival for Artistic Innovation), Queen's University Belfast (Sonorities 2014, 2016 and 2018), Salone Internazionale del Mobile 2012, Helsinki Music Center / Sibelius Academy, Florida International University (New Music Miami Festival), New York City Electroacoustic Music Festival, Deep Listening Institute and the Electronic Language International Festival (FILE – Brazil).
