= Ece Sükan =

Turkish stylist and fashion editor

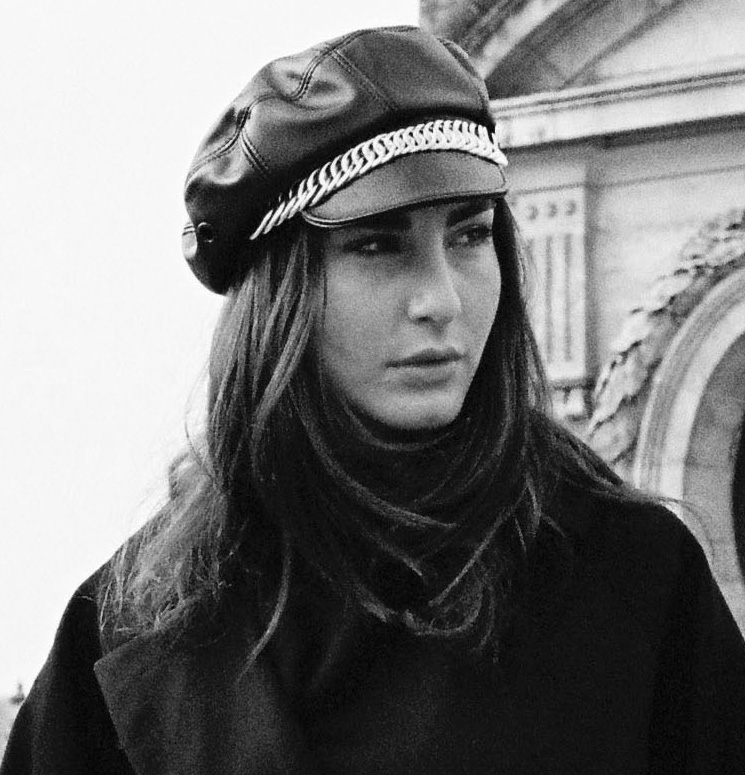
Ece Sükan in 2007

Ece Sükan (born 1977) is a Turkish actress and stylist, creative director and fashion editor who works in Istanbul and New York. She has been called a "Turkish street style star."

== Work ==
Sükan was the editor-at-large for Vogue Turkey from 2008 to 2012, and was previously the fashion director at Marie Claire Turkey. She was one of the first boutique owners to open a vintage clothing boutique in Istanbul in 2009 called Ece Sukan Vintage. Sükan has lectured on her experience in the fashion industry at the Istanbul Fashion Academy. She also hosted a Turkish TV show covering fashion weeks across the world on the NTV station, interviewing Karl Lagerfeld and Jean Paul Gaultier.

She was cast in popular series Haziran Gecesi. In 2018, she was part of a TV show named Gülperi where she played the part of Şeyma.

== Reception ==
Sükan's style has been covered in various influential fashion blogs like The Sartorialist, The Coveteur, Viste la Calle, and Manrepeller, who writes that she is "very clearly someone who considers the weather, the occasion, the company and her personal style when putting together an outfit. Never once will you see her teetering in too-tall shoes during a snowstorm. Never once will you see her looking uncomfortable."
