= Alparslan: Büyük Selçuklu =

Turkish TV series

- Genre: Historical; Action; Adventure
- Based on: Alp Arslan
- Written by: Serdar Özönalan; Emre Konuk
- Directed by: Sedat İnci
- Creative director: Emre Konuk
- Starring: Barış Arduç; Fahriye Evcen; Kayra Zabcı; Mehmet Özgür; Barış Bağcı; Yurdaer Okur; Sarp Levendoğlu; Gizem Karaca; Hande Subaşı; Serhat Tutumluer; Özgür Çevik
- Theme music composer: Gökhan Kırdar
- Composer: Batuhan Fırat
- Country of origin: Turkey
- Original language: Turkish
- No. of seasons: 2
- No. of episodes: 61

Production
- Producer: Emre Konuk
- Running time: 120–150 minutes
- Production company: Akli Film

Original release
- Network: TRT 1
- Release: 8 November 2021 – 6 November 2023

Related
- Uyanış: Büyük Selçuklu

Alparslan: Büyük Selçuklu (lit. 'Alparslan: Great Seljuk') is a Turkish historical action drama series written by Serdar Özönalan, directed by Sedat İnci and produced by Emre Konuk. As a prequel to Uyanış: Büyük Selçuklu, it depicts the political events and wars during Alp Arslan's rule as a Sultan of the Seljuk Empire. In the series, Turkish actor Barış Arduç essays the lead role of Alp Arslan.

The series was filmed on the TRT International Film Studios at various locations including Sakarya, Istanbul and Kocaeli. Turkish musician Gökhan Kırdar composed the opening theme while Kazakh musicians composed other music using instruments from the Turkic world. Alparslan: Büyük Selçuklu premiered on TRT 1 on 8 November 2021. The second season of the show premiered on 19 September 2022.

== Plot ==
On the day that the Seljuk Sultan Tugrul will appoint his heir, he receives the news that the Byzantines killed innocent Turks, including women and children. He orders an expedition to Anatolia. Mysterious assassins attack the Seljuk meliks who went on a campaign. The traces of the attack take Alparslan to a place he never expected. While Alparslan is after the assassins, he saves the life of a Turkmen girl named Akça Hatun, who escaped from Byzantine persecution. However, he is unaware of the secrets Akça hides behind her beauty. The Byzantine Emperor sends General Dukas and Captain Romanos Diogenes to Ani to solve the problems with the Turkmen. However, the mistake made by Yannis, son of Ani Tekfur Kekavmenos, causes Sultan Tuğrul to decide on war. Alparslan, who was given the good news of conquests in his dreams as a child, comes face to face with Byzantium in Pasinler with the Seljuk army. Pasinler will be the first step for Alparslan on his blessed path to open the doors of Anatolia to the Turks. After winning the battle of Pasinler, Sultan Tugrul declares his heir, Alparslan. However, Alparslan removed himself from the state, so he could fight the Christians.

Alparslan and Akca plan to marry. He realizes Akca is a spy for Tekfur Kekavmenos but she changes her heart and works for Seljuk. Meanwhile, Emir Bozan feels cornered and plays his final move: killing Sultan Mevdud of Ghazni, Sehver's husband. When Sehver goes to tell Cagri Bey, her father, but Emir Bozan threatens her to start a throne war which would kill her child. Sehver tries to tell Cagri Bey with a note, but Karaca catches the note and asks Emir Bozan if the note is true. Karaca, is mad with Akca, because she told Cagri that the reason for his daughter Sevher's death was Karaca. Karaca loses her baby and then her life too.

Akca dies in Vaspurakan while they were conquering it, before getting to marry Alparslan, who hangs Kekavmenos, and Vaspurakan is theirs again.

Season 2 starts with Alparslan doing Hajj. They fight against Arslan Yusuf, the killer of Ibrahim Yinal's and Erbaskan's father.

Alparslan is ordered by Sultan Tugrul to spare Yusuf's life, much to Yinal's detest. He is also ordered to marry Seferiye Hatun, daughter of Yusuf, which neither she nor Alparslan wants, Alparslan due to the love and status of Aybike in his heart.Yinal is captured for trying to sell Steel to the enemies secretly, which Erbaskan told Alparslan. Alpagut, Alparslan's spy in Vaspurakan is called by the new Ani Tekfur, Gregor. Seferiye does not want this marriage. She stabs Alparslan on his shoulder at the end of the episode 1 of season 2. Alparslan marries her and slowly their love starts building. Arslan Yusuf turns out to be a traitor much to Seferiye's sadness . Gulce, Seferiye's sister comes to Vaspurakan on Alparslan's order. Seferiye starts loving her husband and he does too. Arslan Besasiri comes in and forms an alliance with Yinal. Yinal turns out to be a traitor much to the detest of Tugrul and Chagri his elder half brothers. Sulayman, Alparslan's brother, falls in love with Tekfur Grigor's daughter, Flora. Chagri gets badly wounded but lives only to get killed a short time later. Seferiye loves her husband. Grigor captures her and wants Alparslan to give up on Vaspurakan and Surmari Inn. Alparslan saves Seferiye, only to watch Kutalmis Bey, a bey who united with Yinal Bey, kill Tekfur Grigor's son, Alexander. Flora does not love Sulayman anymore. Seferiye gives birth to Meliksah. Count Leon appears in Ani. Erbaskan sides with Kutalmis Bey and pulls Gevher into the issue. Sulayman is declared the heir. Turns out later, Celal, the spy of Bessasiri in the palace is actually Altuncan Hatuns dead son, Enusirvan. Celal tries to kill the Sultan, but Altuncan hatun kills him and falls in depression, leading her death. Sultan Tughrul too falls ill, and his vizier, Amidulmulk, sets Sulayman as temporary Sultan. Kutalmis Bey asks Sulayman for Khorasan, which is Cagri bey's legacy to his sons. Sulayman agrees, Despite what Alparslan says. Kutalmis and Alparslan fight for Merv Tribe. Count Leon forces Seferiye and all the alps in Vaspurakan to leave. Merv Tribe belongs to Kutalmis Bey. Selcen Hatun is mad with her son for doing such a thing. After all that, Alparslan finds the will of Sultan Tugrul which says that Alparslan is to be Sultan after Sultan Tugrul. After lots of hardships, and Alpagut getting martyred, Seferiye losing her developing baby, Kutalmis fighting a war against Alparslan, and dying, his sons Mansur and Sulayman Shah coming with their uncle, Alparslan's brother Qavurt. After all that, Alparslan finally becomes Sultan Alparslan and Suleyman and Flora run away. Qavurt's son Merdan is a troublemaker and he soon betrays Alparslan, uniting with his enemy Count Leon. Qavurt knows about it all, but pretends not to. Eventually Alparslan strangles him. Qavurt then revolts against Alparslan and takes over Kirman. Sultan Alparslan's brother Emir Yaquti comes too, and Qavurt pretends to die. Roman Diegones comes too, and now he is the general. A princess, Louisa meets Alparslan when they are on trail of an enemy. She touches his face lovingly and makes Seferiye furious. Later Yaquti proposed her but she refuses. After Leon escapes from prison, that Roman put him in, he tries to attack Seferiye, but Louisa is on Alparsaln's side, she takes him away. Alparsalan conquers Ani and kills Count Leon . Roman Deiogenes runs away with his assistant Iraz, who is a converted Turk.

Alparslan fights the war of Malazgirt with Roman Diogenes and Alparslan wins, which leads to Anatolia being open for the Turks. At the end of season 2 Alparslan frees Diogenes.

== Cast ==
=== Main ===
- Barış Arduç as Muhammed Alparslan: a Seljuk Sultan, husband of Seferiye Sultan, son of Çağrı Bey, nephew of Tuğrul Bey. Step-son of Selcan Hatun. Half-brother of Suleyman, Begim Sevher, Gevher, Hatice Arslan, Yakuti and Kavurt.
- Fahriye Evcen as Akça "Aybike" Hatun (Maria): Alparslan's fiancée, daughter of Nizamülmülk and Meryem Hatun (Maria)(deceased). Was abducted by Kekavmenos while an infant after her tribe being attacked. She was raised by Kekavmnenos under the name of Maria, in order to became the key of the Selcuk destruction. She was told the truth by Alpagut when she was young. Died during the siege of Vaspurakan by Kekavmenos' hands, under her imprisoned father and Alparslan's eyes.
- Kayra Zabcı as Seferiye Sultan: wife of Alparslan, daughter of Emir Arslan Yusuf, elder sister of Gülce Hatun, descended from Karakhanids.
- Mehmet Özgür as Atabey/Hace Nizamülmülk (Hasan): a Seljuk official. Father of Akça "Aybike" Hatun. Özgür reprises his role from Uyanış: Büyük Selçuklu.
- Barış Bağcı as Tuğrul Bey: founder of the Seljuk Empire. (deceased)
- Korel Cezayirli as Süleyman: brother of Alparslan, Yakuti, Kavurd, Şehver and Gevher Hatun, son of Çağrı Bey and Selcan Hatun, and widower of Karaca Hatun, husband of Flora. (deceased)
- Yurdaer Okur as Tuğrul Bozan, an Emir in Ghaznavids. But actually leader of forbidden Shia Islam organisation Qarmatians, killed Begin Sehver Sultan and assassinated Sultan Mevdud. Gets beheaded by Alparslan. (deceased).
- Sarp Levendoğlu as General/Kaiser Romanos IV Diogenes.
- Gizem Karaca (season 1) / Hande Subaşı (season 2) as Eudokia Makrembolitissa
- Erdinç Gülener as Çağrı Bey: brother of Tugrul Sultan. Maternal half-brother of Ibrahim Yinal. Father of Alparslan, Kavurd, Yakuti, Begim Şehver, Hatice Arslan, Süleyman and Gevher Hatun. (deceased)
- Uygar Özçelik as İbrahim Yınal: the maternal half brother of Tuğrul Bey and Çağrı Bey. Paternal half brother of Erbaskan. He is the uncle of Alparslan, Kavurd and Süleyman. Husband of Öke Hatun.(deceased)
- Serhat Tutumluer as Tekfur Grigor. (deceased)
- Devrim Saltoğlu as Emir Arslan Besasiri, who was a ruler of Bagdat. (deceased).
- Özgür Çevik as Count Leon. (deceased)

=== Recurring ===
- Kaan Yalçin as Kavurd Bey, a Seljuk Melik, Emir of Kirman, eldest son of Çağrı Bey, nephew of Tuğrul Bey and elder brother of Yakuti, Alparslan, Begim Şehver, Süleyman, Hatice Arslan and Gevher Hatun. Father of Melik Merdan.
- Betül Çobanoğlu as Selcan Hatun: wife of Çağrı Bey. Mother of Suleyman, Yakuti, Begim Sehver, Gevher and Hatice Arslan. Raised Alparslan as her own son.
- Hakan Şahin as Kündürî. (deceased)
- Esila Umut as Gevher Hatun: sister of Alparslan, Kavurd, Süleyman and Begim Şehver, wife of Erbaskan.
- Ferit Kaya as Erbaskan: paternal half brother of Ibrahim Yinal, Husband of Gevher. (deceased)
- Burak Ali Özkan as Shehzade Mesud, son of the Ghaznavid State emperor Sultan Mevdud and Begim Sehver Sultan, grandson of Çağrı Bey, nephew of Alparslan.
- Ayşegül Ünsal as Akınay Hatun, mother of Alpagut, widow of Temurleng.
- Burak Şafak as Avar Bey.
- Onur Aycelik as Artuk Bey.
- Kutay Sungar as Atsız Bey.
- Emre Bulut as Afşin Bey.
- Merve Nil Güder as Gülce Hatun, daughter of Emir Arslan Yusuf, younger sister of Seferiye Hatun.
- Cihan Muğlu (kid) as Serdar Alp.
- Bora Cengiz as Alexander. Son of Tekfur Grigor, Brother of Flora.(deceased)
- Anil Özdemirci as Süleyman Şah, based from Suleiman ibn Qutalmish, son of Kutalmiş Bey, Brother of Melik Mansur.
- Doğukan Çevik as Melik Mansur, son of Kutalmiş Bey, Brother of Süleyman Şah.
- Kanbolat Görkem Arslan as Kutalmiş Bey, based from Qutalmish, Father of Süleyman Şah and Melik Mansur. (deceased)
- Alican Okumuş as Celal/Enuşirvan, Real son of Altuncan Hatun, who became bad at Sultan Tugrul and after that dies. (deceased)
- Umut Karadağ as Emir Arslan Yusuf: son of Ali Tegin, father of Seferiye Hatun and Gülce Hatun, descended from Karakhanids. (deceased)
- Fırat Topkorur as Alpagut, son of Temurleng and Akınay Hatun. (deceased)
- Esra Kızıldoğan as Altuncan Hatun: Tuğrul Bey's wife, Mother of Enuşirvan. (deceased)
- Dilaray Yeşilyaprak as Flora, daughter of Tekfur Grigor, sister of Alexander, wife of Süleyman. (deceased)
- Öykü Gürman as Öke Hatun: wife of Ibrahim Yınal Bey. (deceased)
- Yıldırım Fikret Urağ as Amidülmulk, Vizier of Süleyman. (deceased)
- Atsız Karaduman as Aybars Bey. (Deceased)
- Ümit Acar as Papa Stefanos/Şamil, a friend of Sultan Tuğrul. (deceased)
- Gürkan Çolaker as Resul Tegin, brother of Kutalmiş Bey. (deceased)
- Şahin Çelik as Batur Bey.
- Kerem Poyraz Kayaalp as Batuis, Alexander's assistant. (deceased)
- Tuğçe Turker as Zeren, assistant of Seferiye Hatun. (deceased)
- Talat Can Büyükaltay as Toygar Bey.
- Alper Güngor as Tekin Bey.
- Gökhan Güngor as Goktualp. (deceased)
- Mustafa Kazar as Kral Bagrat, based from Bagrat IV of Georgia, after that becomes Muslim.
- Doğanay Ünal as Melik Merdan, a fictional character. Son of Kavurd. (deceased)
- Nesrin Yılmaz as Julia.
- Gökhan Tercanlı as Hacip Yasin.
- Deniz Çatalbaş as Commander Iraz, Diyogen's Assistant.
- Aslıhan Karalar as Princess Luiza, daughter of Prince Kürgen.
- Emre Basalak as Emir Yakuti, son of Çağri Bey, nephew of Sultan Tuğrul, brother of Sultan Alparslan, Kavurd, Begim Şehver, Hatice Arslan, Süleyman and Gevher. Father of Zübeyde Hatun.
- Alptekin Serdengeçti as Prince Kürgen, father of Princess Luiza. (deceased)

=== Season 1 ===
- Toprak Sergen as Katakalon Kekaumenos, a Byzantine Tekfur (deceased).
- Emre Kızılırmak as Georgian Prince Rati, son of Prince Liparit. (deceased)
- Mehmet Ünal as Georgian Prince Ivan, son of Prince Liparit. (deceased)
- Saner Pakoğlu as Liparit IV of Kldekari, Georgian Prince, general, and political figure that get caught by Seljuk in a war. (deceased)
- Zeynep Özder as Begim Şehver Sultan: daughter of Çağrı Bey, the wife of the Ghaznavid Sultan Mevdud and the sister of Alparslan, Kavurd, Yakuti Süleyman, Hatice Arslan and Gevher Hatun (deceased).
- Metehan Şahiner as Prince Yannis, Tekfur Kekavmenos son. (deceased).
- Rabia Soytürk as Karaca Hatun: Süleyman's wife, Tuğrul Bozan's sister (deceased).
- Burak Demir as Hervé Frankopoulos : a Norman mercenary general in Byzantine service during the 1050s, former friend and enemy of Katakalon Kekavmenos. (deceased)
- Olcay Kavuzlu as Hace Dıhistani, Vizier of Sultan Tuğrul. (deceased)
- Tevfik Erman Kutlu as Ferzat, Friend of Ibrahim Yinal. (deceased)
- Tolga Öztürk as Hacip Yusuf, Seljuk Emir (deceased)
- Mim Kemal Öke as Akbilge.
- Sinan Tuzcu as Constantine X Doukas. (deceased)

== Episodes ==
Season	Episodes	Originally released	
Season	Episodes	First released	Last released
1	27	November 8, 2021	May 30, 2022
2	34	September 19, 2022	November 6, 2023

== Marketing ==
On 7 September 2021, director Emre Konuk released a title sequence for the first episode.
