= Sönmüş Ocak =

Sönmüş Ocak is a Turkish TV series which is based on Reşat Nuri Güntekin's book. The TV series premiered in 1980 on TRT 1. It was directed by Okan Uysaler and its production assistant is Mustafa Şen.

== Cast ==
- Aytaç Arman - Remzi
- Zuhal Olcay - Nüveyre
- Bahar Öztan
- Nuri Alço
