= Little Lord =

- Küçük Ağa
- Genre: Comedy Drama
- Written by: Ahmet Yurdakul; Sinan Yurdakul; Ozan Yurdakul
- Directed by: Aysun Akyüz; Erol Özlevi
- Starring: Sarp Levendoğlu; Birce Akalay; Emir Berke Zincidi
- Theme music composer: Aria
- Composer: Aria
- Country of origin: Turkey
- Original language: Turkish
- No. of seasons: 2
- No. of episodes: 50

Production
- Running time: 100 minutes
- Production company: Erler Film

Original release
- Network: Kanal D
- Release: 28 January 2014 – 17 March 2015

Little Lord or Küçük Ağa is a Turkish comedy eeries. The series was broadcast on channel Kanal D in Turkey and produced by Turker İnanoğlu. It premiered on 28 January 2014 and the final episode was aired on 17 March 2015 after 50 episodes and 2 seasons. Also broadcast on Indian Television dubbed in Hindi on Zindagi.

== Plot ==
Little Lord or Little Master Mehmetcan Acar (Emir Berke Zincidi) is a child who is tensed because his parents are planning divorce. MehmetCan's grandfather (played by Zeki Alasya) is a landlord (Ağa in Turkish) and according to the local tradition, Mehmetcan's Father and also Mehmetcan are heirs of his property. Mehmetcan's grandparents loves him so much and everybody in his town calls him Küçük Ağa (Little Master).

Mehmetcan's mother is a doctor, while his father owns an advertising agency. But their relationship has ups and downs and mostly hassling. Although having a strong love, they couldn't achieve to solve their problems and live peacefully. Mehmetcan is very sad about the situation and he tries hard to find a way to force his parents to reunite. He do naughty things and pranks, cause funny troubles, etc. to make his parents realize his feelings.

== Cast ==
- Birce Akalay as Sinem Acar.
- Sarp Levendoğlu as Ali Acar.
- Emir Berke Zincidi as Mehmetcan Acar.
- Zeki Alasya as Mehmet Ağa.
- Nazan Diper as Esma.
- Ruhsar Ocal as Nur Sipahi.
- Şukru Turen as Adnan Sipahi
- Kayhan Yıldızoglu as Burhan Sipahi
- Ada elbir as Ece.
