= 26th TVyNovelas Awards Colombia =

The 26th TVyNovelas Awards Colombia ceremony, took place on 16 September 2017 at the Chamorro Entertainment City Hall events center in Bogotá. The ceremony is presented by Iván López, and Mabel Moreno.

== Winners and nominees ==
Winners are listed first, highlighted in boldface, and indicated with a double dagger (‡).

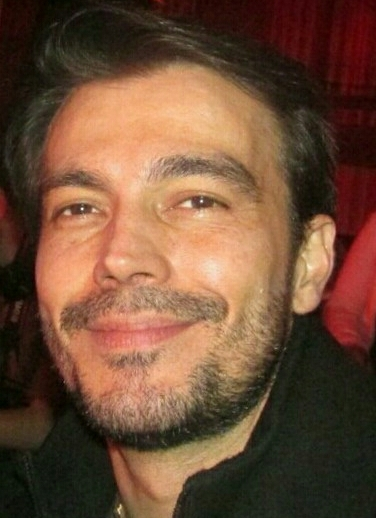
Venezuelan actor Luciano D'Alessandro, won as Best Lead Actor of Telenovela.

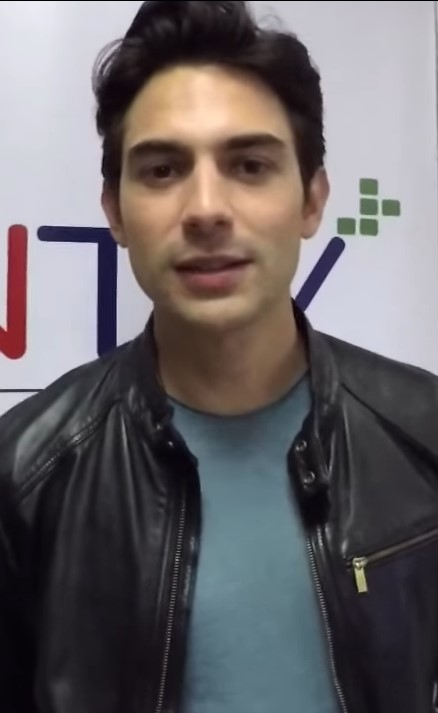
Colombian actor Sebastián Eslava, won as Best Lead Actor of Serie.

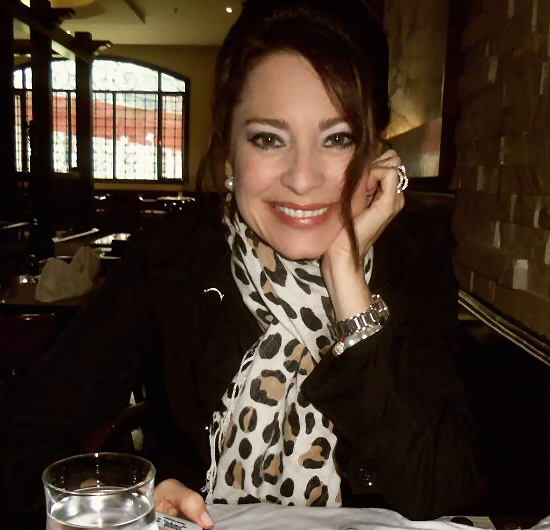
Colombian actress María Elena Döehring, won as Best Female Antagonist of Serie.

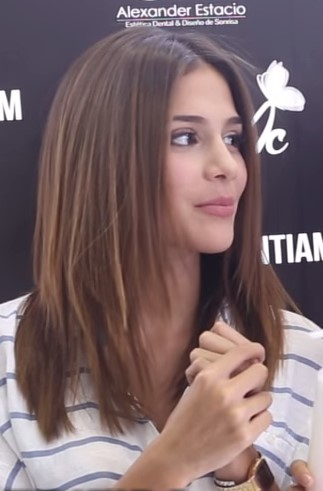
Colombian actress Greeicy Rendón, won as Best Supporting Actress of Serie.

**Best Telenovela**: **La ley del corazón — RCN Televisión**‡; Azúcar — RCN Televisión; La esclava blanca — Caracol Televisión; La Nocturna — Caracol Televisión; Polvo carnavalero — Caracol Televisión	**Best Television series**: **La Niña — Caracol Televisión**‡; Francisco el matemático — RCN Televisión; Déjala morir — Telecaribe; Los Morales — Caracol Televisión; Sin senos sí hay paraíso — Caracol Televisión
**Best Lead Actress of Telenovela**: **Laura Londoño** — **La ley del corazón** **as Julia Escallón**‡; Carolina Acevedo — En la boca del lobo as Lena Duque; Johanna Cure — Polvo carnavalero as Elizabeth Abuabara; Nerea Camacho — La esclava blanca as Victoria Quintero; Yuri Vargas — La Nocturna as Ingrid Acevedo	**Best Lead Actress of Serie**: **María Laura Quintero** — **Los Morales** **as Nevis Troya**‡; Aída Bossa — Déjala morir as Emilia Herrera; Ana María Estupiñán — La Niña as Belky; Carolina Gaitán — Sin senos sí hay paraíso as Catalina Marín; Margarita Muñoz — Venganza as Amanda Santana
**Best Lead Actor of Telenovela**: **Luciano D'Alessandro** — **La ley del corazón** **as Pablo Domínguez**‡; Ernesto Ballén — La Nocturna as Germán Jiménez; Rafael Zea — Polvo carnavalero as Alejandro Mallarino; Brian Moreno — Todo es prestao as Galy Galiano; Jimmy Vásquez — La Nocturna as Faber Salazar	**Best Lead Actor of Serie**: **Sebastián Eslava** — **La Niña** **as Manuel**‡; Carlos Torres — Francisco el matemático as Francisco Quintana; Julio Meza — Los Morales as Miguel Morales; Jerónimo Cantillo — Los Morales as Kaleth Morales; Iván López — No olvidarás mi nombre as Sergio Aparicio
**Best Female Antagonist of Telenovela**: **Carolina Acevedo** — **La ley del corazón** **as Jimena Rivera**‡; Alejandra Borrero — Azúcar as Raquel Vallecilla; Isabella Córdoba — Polvo carnavalero as María José; Norma Martínez — La esclava blanca as Adela de Parreño	**Best Female Antagonist of Serie**: **María Elena Döehring** — **Venganza** **as Victoria Piedrahíta**‡; Katherine Escobar — Francisco el matemático as Mariana Rivera; Johanna Fadul — Sin senos sí hay paraíso as Daniela Beltrán; Majida Issa — Sin senos sí hay paraíso as Yésica Beltrán; Kimberly Reyes — Cuando vivas conmigo as Mabel Barranza
**Best Male Antagonist of Telenovela**: **Sebastián Martínez** — **La ley del corazón** **as Camilo Borrero**‡; John Alex Toro — Azúcar as Francisco Javier Marulanda; Juan Pablo Shuk — Hilos de sangre azul as Sergio Sader; Pedro Palacio — Polvo carnavalero as Bonifacio del Cristo Martínez; Miguel de Miguel — La esclava blanca as Nicolás Parreño	**Best Male Antagonist of Serie**: **Sebastián Martínez** — **Bloque de búsqueda** **as Capitán Antonio Gavilán**‡; Diego Vásquez — La Niña as Coronel Luis Barragán; Édgar Vittorino — Los Morales as Carmelo Cuello; Javier Gómez — Venganza as Ramón Piedrahíta; Juan David Galindo — Francisco el matemático as Arturo Sanabria
**Best Supporting Actress of Telenovela**: **Lina Tejeiro** — **La ley del corazón** **as Catalina Mejía and** **Venganza** **as Claudia Bustillo**‡; Consuelo Luzardo — La Nocturna as Doña Pilar; Helena Mallarino — La ley del corazón as María Cristina Correa; Mabel Moreno — La ley del corazón as María del Pilar Garcés; Patricia Tamayo — Polvo carnavalero as Beatriz Otero	**Best Supporting Actress of Serie**: **Greeicy Rendón** — **Las Vega's** **as Camila Vega**‡; Catherine Siachoque — Sin senos sí hay paraíso as Hilda Santana; Danielle Arciniegas — Francisco el matemático as María Mónica Sánchez; Marcela Benjumea — La Niña as Mireya Pinzón; Verónica Orozco — Bloque de búsqueda as Ana María Velandia de Gavilán
**Best Supporting Actor of Telenovela**: **Iván López** — **La ley del corazón** **as Nicolás Ortega**‡; Beto Villa Jr — Polvo carnavalero as Ramón de Jesús Abuabara; Juan Pablo Barragán — La ley del corazón as Marcos Tibatá; Julio César Pachón — El tesoro as Silvio Murcia; Rodrigo Candamil — La ley del corazón as Alfredo Duperly	**Best Supporting Actor of Serie**: **Variel Sánchez** — **La Niña** **as Víctor Manjarrés**‡; Andrés Rojas — Francisco el matemático as Juan Camilo Aza; Emmanuel Esparza — Venganza as César Riaño; Fabián Ríos — Sin senos sí hay paraíso as Albeiro Marín; Jacques Toukhmanian — Venganza as Martín Lanz
**Revelation of the Year of Telenovela or Serie**: **Kevin Bury** — **Francisco el matemático** **as Brayan Largo**‡; Dylan Fuentes — Francisco el matemático as Cristian Molinares; Juana del Río — La ley del corazón as Fernando Segura / María Fernanda Segura; Paola Moreno — La esclava blanca as Remedios; Victoria Ortiz — La Niña as María Luisa Barragán	**Favorite Musical Theme of Telenovela or Serie**: **"Me Llamas"** — **La ley del corazón** **by Piso 21**‡; "Cuando Vivas Conmigo" — Cuando vivas conmigo by Alejandro Scarpetta; "Polvo Carnavalero" — Polvo carnavalero by Beto Villa Jr; "Te Invito" — La Niña by Herencia de Timbiquí; "Vivo en el Limbo" — Los Morales by Jerónimo Cantillo
**Favorite Director of Telenovela or Serie**: **Victor Mallarino and Sergio Osorio** — **La ley del corazón**‡; Herney Luna and Consuelo González — Francisco el matemático; Liliana Bocanegra y Mateo Stivelberg — La esclava blanca; Rodrigo Lalinde and Israel Sánchez — Bloque de búsqueda; Rodrigo Triana and Camilo Vega — La Niña	**Favorite Author of Telenovela or Serie**: **Mónica Agudelo and Felipe Agudelo** — **La ley del corazón**‡; Fernán Rivera, Juan Carlos Troncoso and Elkin Ospina — Francisco el matemático; Gustavo Bolívar — Sin senos sí hay paraíso; Jhonny Ortiz, Adriana Barreto and Karen Martínez — Los Morales; Juana Uribe, María Claudia Torres, Ricardo Aponte, Leonor Sardi, Yamile Daza and Diego Osorio — La Niña
**Best Contest or Reality Program**: **Desafío Súper Humanos** — **Caracol Televisión**‡; Día a día — Caracol Televisión; Ellos están aquí — RCN Televisión; La Red — Caracol Televisión; Muy buenos días — RCN Televisión	**Best Variety Presenter**: **Claudia Bahamón** — **MasterChef**‡; Carlos Vargas — La Red; Dani Hoyos — The Suso's Show; Laura Acuña — Muy buenos días; Rafael Taibo — Ellos están aquí
