= Mentira =

Mentira or Mentiras may refer to:

== Film and TV ==
- Mentiras (film), a 1986 Mexican drama film directed by Abel Salazar and Alberto Mariscal
- La Mentira, a 1952 film starring Marga López and Jorge Mistral
- La Mentira, a 1970 film starring Julissa and Enrique Lizalde
- La mentira (1965 TV series), a Mexican telenovela set in Brazil for Telesistema Mexicano
- La mentira (1998 TV series) or Twisted Lies, a Mexican telenovela for Televisa
- Mentiras, la serie, a 2025 adaptation

== Music ==
- Mentiras, el musical, Mexican musical produced by OCESA
- "Mentira" (Hernaldo Zúñiga song), 1982 song by Hernaldo Zúñiga, later covered by Buddy Richard, Valeria Lynch, and others
- "Mentira" (Karoll Márquez and Martina la Peligrosa song), 2020
- "Mentira", song by La Ley from MTV Unplugged, 2001
- "Mentira", song by Manu Chao from Clandestino, 1998
- "Mentira", song by Miranda! from Es Mentira, 2002
- "Mentiras", song by Daniela Romo from Daniela Romo, 1983
- "Mentiras", song by Los Amigos Invisibles from Commercial, 2009
- "Mentiras", song by Lupita D'Alessio, 1987
- "Mentiras", song by María Daniela y su Sonido Lasser, 2005
- "Mentiras", song by Remmy Valenzuela, 2019
- "Mentiras", song by Selena from Selena, 1989
- "Mentiras", song by Brazilian band Zero from Quinto Elemento, 2007
- "Mentirás", song by Ana Mena from Bellodrama, 2023
