= Sebastián Eslava =

Colombian actor

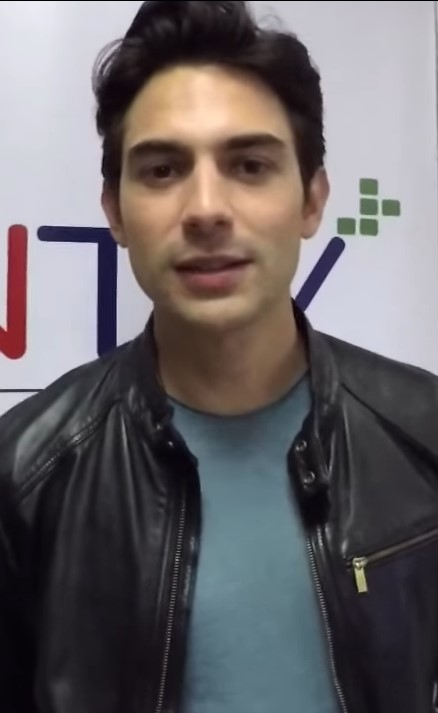
- Eslava in 2017
- Born: Bogotá, Colombia
- Occupation: Actor
- Years active: 2007–present
- Father: Pepe Cáceres

Sebastián Eslava is a Colombian film and television actor. He is known known for his role in the Colombian drama series The Girl, as Manuel Monsalve.

== Early life and education ==
Sebastián Eslava is the son of the famous bullfighter Pepe Cáceres.

== Career ==
Eslava played a lead role as Manuel Monsalve in the 2016 Colombian TV series The Girl (La niña), made for Caracol Televisión and later screened on Netflix.

In 2018 he played Marlon Cruz, one of the main characters, in 69 episodes of Paraíso Travel.

In 2025 Eslava played a lead role as Jhon Lloreda, a corporal in the French Foreign Legion, in the British-French feature film Legionario.

== Awards and nominations ==
Year	Award	Category	Works	Result
2017	26th TVyNovelas Awards Colombia	Favorite Series Male Protagonist	The Girl	Won
2017	India Catalina Awards	Best Lead Actor in a Telenovela or Series	The Girl	Won

== Filmography ==
=== Film ===
Year	Title	Role	Notes
2007	El percance perfecto	Lucio	
2009	The Battle: Cinco de Mayo	Juan	Video
2015	Bastards y Diablos	Young Gabriel	
2016	Pablo	Pablo	Also writer and producer
2025	Legionario	Jhon Lloreda	

=== Television ===
Year	Title	Role	Notes
2007	Victoria	Pacho	
2008	Aquí no hay quien viva	Alex Guerra	
2009	Niños ricos, pobres padres	Miguel Zabala	
2013	Mamá también	Martín	
2016	The Girl	Manuel Monsalve	Main role; 86 episodes
2017	Venganza	Kike	2 episodes
2017	Narcos	Nicolas Rodríguez	Recurring role (season 3); 5 episodes
2018	Paraíso Travel	Marlon Cruz	Main role; 69 episodes
2019	Siempre bruja	Esteban	Main role; 10 episodes
2019	Wild District	Merida	Main role (season 2); 6 episodes
