= Los Morales =

Colombian telenovela

- Genre: Telenovela
- Written by: Arleth Castillo; Adelaida Otálora; Erik King; Juan Sebastián Castillo
- Directed by: Jaime Rayo; Andrés Bierdman
- Creative directors: Gŭarnizo and Lizaralde
- Starring: Julio Meza; María Laura Quintero; Jerónimo Cantillo; Vivian Ossa; Édgar Vittorino; Adriana Ricardo; Mariane Schaller; Obeida Benavides; Yuldor Gutiérrez; Jeymmy Vargas; Christian Better; Yorneis García; Marianny Egurrola
- Opening theme: "Vivo en el limbo" performed by Kaleth Morales
- Country of origin: Colombia
- Original language: Spanish
- No. of seasons: 1
- No. of episodes: 73

Production
- Executive producer: Luis Alberto Restrepo
- Production locations: Valledupar, Cesar; Cartagena
- Camera setup: Multi-camera

Original release
- Network: Caracol Televisión
- Release: 22 May – 11 September 2017

Related
- Polvo carnavalero; Tarde lo conocí

Los Morales (Lit: The Morales / English: Dynasty) and stylized onscreen as Los Morales, lo que se hereda, se canta, is a Colombian biographical telenovela based on the life of the famous Colombian singers, father and son duo Kaleth and Miguel Morales and produced by Luis Alberto Restrepo for Caracol Televisión. It is known in other countries as La Dinastía and stylized as La Dinastía, cuando canta el corazón and in English as Dynasty, When the Heart Sings. It stars Julio Meza, María Laura Quintero and Jerónimo Cantillo as the Morales family. The series follows the problems of love of Miguel and Kaleth and its difficult situation to become known throughout Colombia as singers.

== Plot ==
The series narrates the history of the singer and composer of vallenato Kaleth Morales. From childhood he began his musical career, which was influenced by the artistic and musical career of his parents. Years later, as an adult, he rose to fame with the release of several important albums and singles, which is why he was recognized nationally in his short career, passing the sentimental relationships he obtained throughout his life And finally his death event.

== Cast ==
=== Main ===
- Julio Meza as Miguel Morales: He is a sinner with dreams of a well-known businessman, Nevis's husband and Kaleth's father.
- María Laura Quintero as Nevis Troya: She is a young woman from Chimichagua, wife of Miguel and mother of Kaleth.
- Jerónimo Cantillo as Kaleth Morales: He is the son of Miguel and Nevis, his dreams are to be vallenato singer.
- Vivian Ossa as July Cuello: She is the daughter of Carmelo and the bride of Kaleth.
- Édgar Vittorino as Carmelo Cuello: He is the main enemy of the family Morales, father of July.
- Adriana Ricardo as Anabel: She is the mother of Carmelo and the lover of Pedro.
- Mariane Schaller as Dionisia Araujo: She is the godmother of Nevis.
- Obeida Benavides as Abuela Morales: She is the mother of Pedro and the grandmother of Miguel.
- Yuldor Gutiérrez as Pedro Miguel Morales: He is Miguel's father and Anabel's lover.
- Jeymmy Vargas as Evelti Morales: She is the elder sister of Michael and the aunt of Kaleth.
- Christian Better as Pimiento: He is one of Miguel Morales' best friends.
- Yorneis García as El Pote Daza: He is the one that sponsors the most recognized singers.
- Marianny Egurrola as Monserrat Troya: She is the sister of Nevis, she has a son and her husband.
- Pillao Rodriguez as Sasa: He is the love rival of Kaleth Morales

=== Recurring ===
- Sunamy Rodríguez as Ninfa López: She is the daughter of Nereo.
- John Bolivar as Nereo López: He is Miguel's boss and Ninfa's father.
- Daniel Moreno as Kanner Morales: He is the brother of Kaleth.
- Junior Polo as Keyner Morales: He is the brother of Kaleth.
- Alberto Kammerer as Young Kaleth Morales
- María Nela Sinisterra as Marlyn

== Production ==
The series had been proposed in 2015 for RCN Televisión, but this company rejected it. Later in the same year Caracol Televisión had acquired the authorization of the family of Kaleth Morales to start the production of the series. At the beginning of 2016 more than 370 actors attended the casting to look for the cast. The filming of the series took place in municipalities near Valledupar, such as San Juan del Cesar. There were also locations in Cartagena, Barranquilla and Bogotá.

== Reception ==
The series premiered without advertisements commercial occupying the second place like the program more seen of the Colombian television in the schedule of the 9 of the night. Its average premiere a total of 12.8 million viewers, even so I can not overcome the competition program Yo me llamo, who took the first place as the most watched Colombian television program.

== Episodes ==
| No. | Title | Original release date | Colombia viewers (millions) |
|---|---|---|---|
Part 1
| 1 | "Miguel tiene una extraña revelación que le indica cómo encontrar su camino" | 22 May 2017 | 12.8 |
| 2 | "Miguel y Carmelo luchan por conquistar a Nevis, ¿cuál lo logrará?" | 23 May 2017 | 12.8 |
| 3 | "Nevis se deja cautivar por Miguel y con un beso inician su romance" | 24 May 2017 | 10.0 |
| 4 | "Una mujer se le mete por los ojos a Miguel, ¿lo separará de Nevis?" | 25 May 2017 | 9.8 |
| 5 | "Miguel jura amor eterno a Nevis, pero la vida les pondrá pruebas muy duras" | 26 May 2017 | 9.8 |
| 6 | "El amor de Miguel y Nevis es más fuerte que quienes desean separarlos" | 30 May 2017 | 10.5 |
| 7 | "Una noticia inesperada podría cambiar los planes de Miguel y Nevis" | 31 May 2017 | 9.7 |
| 8 | "Qué bendición, en el vientre de Nevis crece el fruto de su amor con Miguel" | 1 June 2017 | 10.1 |
| 9 | "Nace Kaleth Morales mientras Miguel se define entre cantante o cocinero" | 2 June 2017 | 9.5 |
| 10 | "Una mala jugada está a punto de acabar con la carrera musical de Miguel" | 5 June 2017 | 9.5 |
| 11 | "Para que aprenda, Carmelo recibe un fuerte castigo que lo hace reflexionar" | 6 June 2017 | 12.0 |
| 12 | "A Miguel Morales se le presentan tentaciones que ponen en peligro su hogar" | 7 June 2017 | 11.0 |
| 13 | "Las travesuras de Kaleth por July traen grandes problemas para los Morales" | 8 June 2017 | 9.2 |
| 14 | "El nacimiento de Eva Sandrith ayuda a reparar la relación de Miguel y Nevis" | 9 June 2017 | 11.1 |
| 15 | "Nevis le pone una condición a Miguel para grabar su nuevo disco en Medellín" | 12 June 2017 | 11.5 |
| 16 | "Kaleth cumple su sueño de grabar por primera vez, pero Miguel le corta las alas" | 13 June 2017 | 12.1 |
| 17 | "Los Morales inician una nueva vida lejos de las tentaciones y los problemas" | 14 June 2017 | 11.7 |
| 18 | "La vida estudiantil no es nada fácil y Kaleth encuentra sus primeros obstáculos" | 15 June 2017 | 11.7 |
| 19 | "Miguel Morales recibe una aterradora profecía sobre la música y su familia" | 16 June 2017 | 10.9 |
Part 2
| 20 | "Kaleth encuentra en July Cuello su gran inspiración para escribir canciones" | 20 June 2017 | 12.2 |
| 21 | "Miguel toma decisiones radicales por sus problemas con Pimiento y Carmelo" | 21 June 2017 | 11.2 |
| 22 | "Miguel acude a su padre para que cuide a Nevis de las intenciones de Carmelo" | 22 June 2017 | 11.3 |
| 23 | "Miguel Morales tiene un viaje con mucha turbulencia" | 23 June 2017 | 11.8 |
| 24 | "Inició la competencia, Kaleth y Sasa se enfrentan por el amor de July" | 27 June 2017 | 11.4 |
| 25 | "A Kaleth y a Sasa les llega competencia en su lucha por conquistar a July" | 28 June 2017 | 11.5 |
| 26 | "¿El principio del fin?, Los Diablines corren peligro por culpa de una pelea de egos" | 29 June 2017 | 10.8 |
| 27 | "Los temores de Miguel están a punto de hacerle perder la cabeza" | 30 June 2017 | 11.1 |
| 28 | "Nevis comete un error que podría acabar con su matrimonio" | 4 July 2017 | 12.9 |
| 29 | "Kaleth está decidido a luchar contra el mundo por el amor de July" | 5 July 2017 | 11.7 |
| 30 | "Se acabó, Pimiento descubre la traición de Miguel y se retira de Los Diablines" | 6 July 2017 | 10.2 |
| 31 | "Miguel se queda sin nada al perder a su esposa y a su agrupación" | 7 July 2017 | 10.5 |
| 32 | "Carmelo aprovecha los problemas para conquistar a Nevis" | 10 July 2017 | 12.7 |
| 33 | "Kaleth enamora a todas con su voz, pero ¿y July?" | 11 July 2017 | 12.2 |
| 34 | "La infidelidad de Mafe está a punto de causar una tragedia" | 12 July 2017 | 13.2 |
| 35 | "Kaleth ve a Mafe y Will en una situación bastante comprometedora" | 13 July 2017 | 11.3 |
| 36 | "¿Y ahora?, Kaleth se queda solo por las mentiras de Will" | 14 July 2017 | 11.7 |
| 37 | "La profecía de la abuela se cumple y se va dejando un gran vacío en la familia" | 17 July 2017 | 12.8 |
| 38 | "El homenaje más sentido, Kaleth cantó con el alma para su abuela" | 18 July 2017 | 13.6 |
| 39 | "¿Y ahora qué hará?, el odio hacia los Morales saca de los cabales a Carmelo" | 19 July 2017 | 11.7 |
| 40 | "Una nueva vida separará los caminos de Kaleth y July" | 21 July 2017 | 12.7 |
| 41 | "Carmelo se enfrenta a la verdad sobre la desaparición de Mafe" | 24 July 2017 | 12.2 |
| 42 | "Carmelo ruega perdón, pero Mafe le da una devastadora noticia" | 25 July 2017 | 13.8 |
| 43 | "July se arma de valor y termina de raíz su relación con Kaleth" | 26 July 2017 | 13.4 |
| 44 | "La vida de Kaleth está de cabeza y cada día ve sus sueños más truncados" | 27 July 2017 | 12.3 |
| 45 | "La boda de Pedro Miguel se ve empañada por el regreso de Shirley" | 28 July 2017 | 12.3 |
| 46 | "¿Será Miguel o Pimiento? Shirley regresa en busca del padre de su hija" | 31 July 2017 | 13.2 |
| 47 | "Kaleth y July toman distintos caminos que los alejarán cada vez más" | 1 August 2017 | 13.8 |
| 48 | "Tatis sufre un grave accidente que pone en vilo a los Cuello y a Keyner" | 2 August 2017 | 12.2 |
| 49 | "Tatis despierta del accidente pero no quiere volver a saber nada de Keyner" | 3 August 2017 | 11.9 |
| 50 | "Miguel le da su merecido a Carmelo al descubrir su plan con Shirley" | 4 August 2017 | 12.8 |
| 51 | "Kaleth Morales se alista para su presentación en la universidad" | 8 August 2017 | 12.4 |
| 52 | "Kaleth vuelve a su tierra para conocer a su hija y pasar tiempo con su familia" | 9 August 2017 | 12.9 |
| 53 | "Kaleth empieza una nueva vida con una gran oportunidad musical" | 10 August 2017 | 12.7 |
| 54 | "¿Y ahora? Nevis descubre el secreto de Kaleth" | 11 August 2017 | 12.6 |
| 55 | "¡Quién lo creería! Miguel canta en la campaña política de Carmelo" | 14 August 2017 | 11.8 |
| 56 | "Bechy se reencuentra con su hijo pero queda con el corazón roto" | 15 August 2017 | 13.3 |
| 57 | "A pesar de la distancia, el amor entre Kaleth y July sigue intacto" | 16 August 2017 | 12.4 |
| 58 | "Carmelo busca ensuciar a Miguel con la plata de sus socios" | 17 August 2017 | 12.9 |
| 59 | "Los sueños de Kaleth para grabar son truncados por Miguel" | 18 August 2017 | 12.9 |
| 60 | "¡Llegó la hora de la verdad! Kaleth graba su primer éxito musical" | 22 August 2017 | 13.9 |
| 61 | "Kaleth y Miguel hacen una promesa por el legado musical" | 23 August 2017 | 12.0 |
| 62 | "Miguel abandona la música para evitar una tragedia familiar" | 24 August 2017 | 13.3 |
| 63 | "la vida de July corre peligro por la carrera política de Carmelo" | 25 August 2017 | 14.4 |
| 64 | "Carmelo termina en la cárcel por sus relaciones con los Daza" | 28 August 2017 | 13.0 |
| 65 | "El tiempo pasa y Kaleth demuestra que tiene todo para ser un doctor" | 29 August 2017 | 13.0 |
| 66 | "A pesar de los años, July y Kaleth mantienen vivo su amor" | 30 August 2017 | 13.0 |
| 67 | "Kaleth graba sus éxitos al lado de July, su gran inspiración" | 1 September 2017 | 12.2 |
| 68 | "Kaleth celebra el lanzamiento de su disco sin July" | 4 September 2017 | 12.8 |
| 69 | "Kaleth está a punto de ser el ‘Rey de la nueva ola’" | 5 September 2017 | 13.2 |
| 70 | "Kaleth y July comienzan una nueva vida juntos" | 6 September 2017 | 13.5 |
| 71 | "Kaleth le pide matrimonio a July, pero su destino fatal ya está escrito" | 7 September 2017 | 13.4 |
| 72 | "Un trágico accidente apaga la voz de Kaleth Morales" | 8 September 2017 | 14.7 |
| 73 | "La vida de Kaleth Morales se apaga y Valledupar le hace un gran homenaje" | 11 September 2017 | 17.5 |

== Ratings ==
Viewership and ratings per season of Los Morales
| Season | Episodes | First aired | | Last aired | | Avg. viewers (millions) | 18–49 rank |
| Season | Episodes | Date | Viewers (millions) | Date | Viewers (millions) | Avg. viewers (millions) | 18–49 rank |
|---|---|---|---|---|---|---|---|
| 1 | 73 | 22 May 2017 | 12.8 | 11 September 2017 | 17.5 | 12.14 | TBD |

== Awards and nominations ==
| Year | Award | Category | Nominated | Result |
|---|---|---|---|---|
| 2017 | TVyNovelas Awards Colombia | Favorite series | Los Morales | Nominated |
| 2017 | TVyNovelas Awards Colombia | Best Favorite Female Lead in a Serie | María Laura Quintero | Won |
| 2017 | TVyNovelas Awards Colombia | Best Favorite Male Lead in a Serie | Jerónimo Cantillo | Nominated |
| 2017 | TVyNovelas Awards Colombia | Best Favorite Male Lead in a Serie | Julio Meza | Nominated |
| 2017 | TVyNovelas Awards Colombia | Best Favorite Male Villain in a Serie | Édgar Vittorino | Nominated |
| 2017 | TVyNovelas Awards Colombia | Best Musical Theme Favorite in a Serie | "Vivo en el limbo" | Nominated |
| 2017 | TVyNovelas Awards Colombia | Favorite writer of telenovelas or series | Jhonny Ortiz, Adriana Barreto & Karen Martínez | Nominated |
| 2017 | Kids' Choice Awards Colombia | Favorite program | Los Morales | Nominated |
| 2017 | Kids' Choice Awards Colombia | Favorite TV Actor | Jerónimo Cantillo | Nominated |
| 2017 | Kids' Choice Awards Colombia | Favorite TV Actress | María Laura Quintero | Nominated |
| 2017 | Kids' Choice Awards Colombia | Favorite Villain | Édgar Vittorino | Nominated |
| 2018 | 34th India Catalina Awards | Best Male Antagonist in a Serie or Telenovela | Édgar Vittorino | Nominated |
