= Elastic Rights =

Spanish media licensing company

- Type: Sociedad Limitada
- Industry: Film/TV distribution, licensing
- Founded: September 2001; 25 years ago
- Founder: Iñaki Orive Martin
- Defunct: January 3, 2014; 12 years ago
- Fate: Liquidation
- Headquarters: Salamanca, Madrid, Spain
- Area served: Worldwide
- Key people: Iñaki Orive Martin (founder)

Elastic Rights SL was a Spanish licensing company, founded in 2001, and distributed animated and live-action series to the Spanish, Portuguese, Italian, Greek and Turkish markets. In the early years, the company also distributed documentary-reality content, largely to Argentina.

== History ==
Ignacio Orive, former managing director of BRB Internacional, founded Elastic in September 2001 with investments from Grupo Inveralia. Among the early titles it distributed were Caillou (from Cinar), Gundam Wing and the Chilean animated film Ogu and Mampato in Rapa Nui. Ahead of UEFA Euro 2004, it obtained rights to Flash Kicker, which it hoped to air on SIC in the second quarter of 2004, and also picked up distribution rights to the RAI documentary series Gente di Notte from Elleti & Co. for Spain, Portugal and Argentina.

Initially, the company covered Spain and Portugal, but, in the 2008, it expanded into Italy, Greece and Turkey with the Argentine series Patito Feo. The discovery of the telenovela niche, popular in Latin America, diversified its activities In 2010, the company entered the French market and opened an office in Paris, after feedback Orive received from local clients.

In 2012, it distributed En terapia, a Dori Media-TV Pública Argentina co-production, to Spain; and in 2013, the rights to Colombian series Chica Vampiro to part of Europe.

In December 2013, the company declared insolvency and shut down activities the following month.
