= Oye bonita =

Colombian telenovela

- Inspired by: Diomedez Diaz
- Story by: Arleth Castillo
- Directed by: Williams González and Katalina Hernandez
- Country of origin: Colombia
- Original language: Spanish
- No. of seasons: 1
- No. of episodes: 170

Production
- Production company: Colombiana de Televisión

Original release
- Network: Caracol Televisión
- Release: October 27, 2008

Oye bonita (Hey Beautiful) is a Colombian telenovela produced by Colombiana de Televisión for Caracol Televisión. It was directed by Williams Gonzalez and Katalina Hernandez. Oye bonita had good ratings during its airing.

Oye bonita stars Karoll Márquez and Diana Hoyos in the lead roles; Nicolás Nocetti and Alejandro Palacio (in his acting debut) feature among the cast. The story is musicalized with the vallenato musical genre and its main theme revolves around disgruntled love.

== Synopsis ==
The story mainly revolves around Monchi Maestri, an aspiring musician in his 20s, loosely written after Diomedes Diaz, minus the negative events of his life. He lives in the El Carrizal town and falls in love with Diana Lacouture despite their families having a conflicted background. Monchi's family, the Maestres, was exiled from its home due to the influence of the Isazas, a powerful family in the Caribbean region of Colombia, and of a close associate and Diana's father, Antoine Lacouture, who regrets having taken the lands of the Maestres.

Monchi and Diana Lacouture fall in love, only for it to be revealed that Diana was to be engaged to Fito (Nicolás Nocetti), an ambitious Argentinian who seeks to marry her for his own obscure intentions.

== Production ==
Oye bonita was produced by Colombiana de TV. Preproduction lasted five years. Shooting began on July 14, 2008 and ended on November 20, 2009. The show's premiere was on October 27, 2008.

The script for Oye bonita was written by Arleth Castillo.

The main location of the telenovela was Girardot, though other locations in Tolima and Caribbean region were also used.

== Cast ==
- Karoll Márquez - Ramón Segundo "Monchi" Maestre Urbina
- Diana Hoyos - Diana Lacouture Murgas "La Bonita"
- Félix Antequera - Ramón "Moncho" Maestre
- Patricia Ércole - Elvia Urbina de Maestre
- Maribel Abello - Josefa Murgas
- Alejandro Palacio - Manuel "El Duro" Isaza
- JOSE EUSEBIO ROJAS,, ANTOINE LACOTOURE)).
- Eileen Moreno - Macarena Maestre Urbina / "Clara Inés"
- Ana María Estupiñán - Chiquinquirá Maestre Urbina
- Lorena Álvarez - Carmen Maestre Urbina
- Margoth Velásquez - Mama Petra
- Eileen Roca - La Nena
- Beto Villa Jr - Elías
- Nicolás Nocetti - Fito Pérez
- Diego Camacho Fallon- The Turkish Guy
- Diana Santamaria - Zunilda

== Music ==
The main song of Oye Bonita, is the eponymous work interpreted by Karoll Márquez.

== Awards and nominations ==
Oye bonita received nominations for the TVyNovelas Awards Colombia.

=== Tv y Novelas awards Colombia ===
Year	Category	Nomination	Result
2009	Best Telenovela	Oye bonita	Nominated
2009	Best Telenovela/Series music theme	Oye bonita	Won
2009	Breakthrough actor	Beto Villa Jr	Nominated
2009	Breakthrough actress	Diana Santamaría	Nominated

=== India Catalina Awards ===
Year	Category	Nomination	Result
2009	Best Telenovela	Oye bonita	Nominated
2009	Best soundtrack	Oye bonita	Won
2009	Best original screenplay of Telenovela	Oye bonita	Nominated
2009	Breakthrough actor	Beto Villa Jr	Nominated
2009	Breakthrough actress	Diana Santamaria	Nominated
