= Karoll Márquez =

Colombian actor

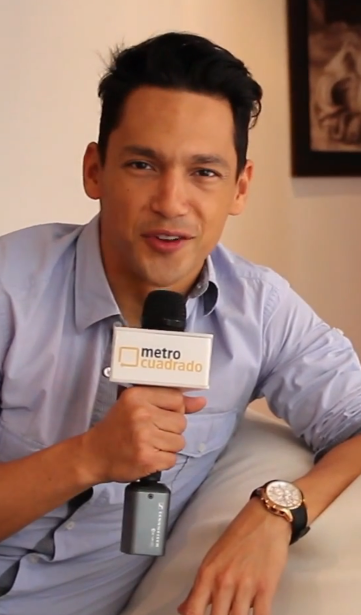
- Born: Karoll Iván Márquez Mendoza c. 1984; Cartagena
- Occupations: Actor; singer
- Years active: 1996–present
- Works: Oye bonita, Un sueño llamado salsa
- Children: 0

Karoll Iván Márquez Mendoza (born c. 1984) is a Colombian actor and singer, known for his starring role in the Caracol Televisión soap opera Oye bonita. He is also known for his roles in Un sueño llamado salsa (2010) and Amor de Carnaval (2012).

== Career ==
Márquez was born and raised in Cartagena, Colombia. When he was 12 years old he studied singing lessons under soprano Margarita Escallón. At age 17, Márquez moved to Bogotá, Colombia, where he made his music debut with the 2000 eponymously titled album Karoll Marquez, and the single Embrujo. Around this time he also had a brief stint acting in the TV show Conjunto Cerrado followed by a five-year contract in Padres e Hijos. In 2000, he also did a cameo as himself in the telenovela Yo soy Betty, la fea.

Throughout his career, Márquez has alternated between music, acting in TV and musical theater. In 2008 he starred in the popular TV musical series Oye bonita (2008), dedicated to the music of Colombian singer Diomedes Díaz. According to a report from Colprensa published in El Universal, the couple portrayed by Karoll Márquez and Diana Hoyos in Oye bonita was "iconic within Colombian television".

Márquez was cast as Nicolás for the TV serial Jennifer Lopez Presents: Como Ama una Mujer (2007), aired by Univision.

In 2012, he starred in the TV show Amor de carnaval (2011), for which he earned a nomination for best villain in a TV show at the TV y Novelas Awards Colombia event of 2013.

In 2013, a group of Colombian celebrities that included Márquez was invited to host as telephone operators in the fundraising event Teletón.

In 2014, Márquez played a secondary role in the TV show La playita. He also conducted the Colombian TV show Un minuto para ganar. In the same year, he collaborated with singer Marbelle to release the music single La confesión. Director Jorge Alí Triana chose Márquez, because of his experience in musicals, to act in Captain Pantoja and the Special Service (Spanish:Pantaleón y las visitadoras) a play based on the book by the same name from Mario Vargas Llosa.

In 2020, Márquez acted in the online play Ella en Mí (2020) and in the plays Hombres a la plancha and Aguanilé. In that same year he released the single Mentira (2020) along with singer Martina La Peligrosa, for the EP Album Dopamina (to be released).

In 2021 Márquez was cast in a supporting role for the TV show Enfermeras.

In 2022, Márquez participated in the reality show Quién es la máscara?.

Some have criticized Marquez' musical career, pointing to his exaggerated facial mannerisms onstage.

== Discography ==
- Karoll Marquez (2000)
- La verdad (2004)
- Cotidiano (2006)
- Vida (2014)
- Dopamina (date tba)

== Personal life ==
Karoll is the oldest of three siblings, including brother Oscar and sister Nathalie. He is the son of Mariela Mendoza de Márquez.
