= La ronca de oro =

- Genre: Telenovela
- Written by: Gerardo Pinzón; Andrés Guzmán; Sandra Motato; Manuel Cubas; Janeth Pacheco; Margarita Londoño; Juan Andrés Granados
- Directed by: Klych López
- Creative director: Diana Trujillo
- Starring: Majida Issa; Ana María Estupiñán; Diego Cadavid; Leonardo Acosta; Laura Garcia; Luis Fernando Montoya; Greeicy Rendón; Marcela Benjumea; Jimena Durán; Ángela Piedrahita; Didier van der Hove; Juan Pablo Gamboa; Abril Schreiber; Diana Neira; Johan Martínez; Alex Adamés; Viviana Serna; José Narváez; Marianne Schaller; Mauro Mauad; Emilia Ceballos
- Theme music composer: Graciela Arango de Tobón
- Opening theme: "Señor" performed by Majida Issa
- Country of origin: Colombia
- Original language: Spanish
- No. of seasons: 1
- No. of episodes: 62

Production
- Executive producer: Aña Piñeres
- Producer: Clara María Ochoa Domínguez
- Production locations: Bogotá; Buga; Cali and Medellín
- Camera setup: Multi-camera
- Production company: CMO Producciones

Original release
- Network: Caracol Televisión
- Release: January 27 – April 25, 2014

La ronca de oro (English: The Voice of Freedom) is a Colombian telenovela produced by CMO Producciones for Caracol Televisión. It is based on the life of the Colombian singer Helenita Vargas.

Ana María Estupiñán and Majida Issa star as the protagonists, Diego Cadavid, Greeicy Rendón and Marcela Benjumea as co-protagonists, while Laura García, Leonardo Acosta star as the antagonists.

== Plot ==
La ronca de oro is the story of Helenita Vargas, a woman who wanted to be free in a terribly sexist era of the 1950s, where women had more duties than rights and were sentenced to be mothers and wives only. Helenita found singing rancheras one way to express her deep desire for freedom, overcoming all obstacles in a prejudiced society, starting with her family. Coming music of Mexico, which after years of struggle would bring success, was the origin of the worst humiliations and sufferings, but also became the soundtrack of her two great loves: one that nearly ended her life and another that filled her days with happiness. Helenita made her mark as a woman, as a person and as a singer, anticipating the taste and feel of the people. Like anyone, she understood that popular music has no age, no sex, no class and that in times of violence, which would achieve unite an entire people would be her unique voice.

== Production ==
After nearly four months of reviewing audio and video recordings, personal moments, newspaper reports, and interviews with Helenita's relatives and friends,...

Another of the great challenges of the golden husky was in the artistic part, because it is set in the years 1950 and 1970. Therefore, the team recorded several scenes in Buga, a city that retains its colonial architecture. Also at several locations in Cali, the Ortiz and La Merced Bridge are some.

== Cast ==
=== Starring ===
- Majida Issa as Sofía Helena Vargas Marulanda / Helenita
- Ana María Estupiñán as Young Sofía Helena Vargas Marulanda / Helenita
- Diego Cadavid as Álvaro José Sálas
- Leonardo Acosta as Germán Hincapié
- Laura Garcia as Ana Julia Marulanda de Vargas
- Luis Fernando Montoya as Luis Vargas
- Greeicy Rendón as Pilar Hincapié Vargas
- Marcela Benjumea as Estrella Ulloa
- Jimena Durán as Maritza Rengifo
- Ángela Piedrahita as Virginia Tafúr
- Didier van der Hove as Mauro Guerra
- Juan Pablo Gamboa as Rubén de la Pava
- Abril Schreiber as Young Virginia Tafúr
- Diana Neira as Young Maritza Rengifo
- Johan Martínez as Young Efraín Vargas
- Alex Adamés as Efraín Vargas Marulanda
- Viviana Serna as Cecilia Hincapié
- José Narváez as Pepe Pardo
- Marianne Schaller as Clarissa de las Américas
- Mauro Mauad as Gregory Paz
- Emilia Ceballos as Luis's girlfriend
- Rose Galvis as Patricia de Journalist

=== Recurring ===
- Rubén Sanz as Giordi
- Ricardo Mejía as Hernando Vargas
- Rashed Estefenn as Ernesto Loaiza
- Mónica Pardo as Young Felicia Vargas
- Camilo Perdomo as Hernando / Nando
- Yolanda Rayo as Graciela Arango de Tobón
- Gustavo Ramirez as Guido
- Alejandro Otero as Enrique López

== Series overview ==
Season	Episodes		Originally released	
Season	Episodes		First released	Last released
1	62	26	January 27, 2014	March 3, 2014
1	62	36	March 4, 2014	April 25, 2014

== Episodes ==
No. overall	No. in season	Title	Original release date	Colombia viewers (millions)
Part 1
1	1	"La historia de oro ha comenzado"	January 27, 2014	15.8
Helena Vargas is a young woman who loves to sing popular music so she struggles so that her dream of being a song star becomes a reality every time she goes on stage.
2	2	"Helena hace su primera audición"	January 28, 2014	15.1
Helena still pledges to be a great singer so despite the prohibitions and severe punishment of her mother to return to the house attends his first hearing aided by Germán.
3	3	"Helena es enviada a Bogotá"	January 29, 2014	13.1
Helena's mother sends her to a boarding school because she wants to be a nun. Hernando his brother has deserted the army to go to Mexico with Helena but must hide because they are looking for him.
4	4	"El salvador de Helenita"	January 30, 2014	13.9
Germán becomes the false savior of Helena in boarding school, however what she does not know is the actions she is performing behind her that go totally against her.
5	5	"Helenita se enamora"	January 31, 2014	12.1
Germán continues in its plan of conquest and little by little Helena is more interested by him in spite of not knowing about its deceits. Luis is more and more unhappy in his marriage thanks to the way of being of Ana Julia.
6	6	"No title for this episode"	February 3, 2014	13.0
Helena suffers a fainting which as a consequence leaves her unable to move for a while but she recovers and is motivated by participating in a beauty contest which she wins, she manages to improve herself.
7	7	"Helena se escapa"	February 4, 2014	12.6
Helena escapes from the coronation ceremony by the beauty pageant to marry Germán but they do not spend the wedding night together for a strong argument.
8	8	"Cecilia pierde el bebé"	February 5, 2014	12.6
Cecilia tells her father about her pregnancy but ends up losing the baby, although Germán takes revenge by sending beaten Ephraim who must leave the city.
9	9	"Helena queda embarazada"	February 6, 2014	14.3
Helena finally gets pregnant and hopes that Germán will change her attitude towards her and her music. Hernando on a visit he asks Mary to marry but upon returning to the army is killed by a companion.
10	10	"Helenita pierde su bebé"	February 7, 2014	13.1
Helena because of the death of Hernando loses the baby that was waiting, reason why Germán the fault and in spite of its bad attitude she is still with him.
11	11	"Helenita escucha en la radio su primera canción"	February 10, 2014	13.7
Helena, her family and friends listen for the first time in the radio the song that recorded in the transmitter nevertheless the critics make comments not kind so Germán is ashamed by her.
12	12	"Helena viaja a España"	February 11, 2014	13.9
Helena's song is well received in Medellín thanks to Pepe, but Germán prevents it from being promoted by taking all the copies of his recording, both travel to Spain to live by his appointment at the embassy.
13	13	"Secuestrada en su propia casa"	February 12, 2014	14.3
Germán keeps Helena controlled at home and does not allow her to communicate with her family in any way but despite this Carmen helps him by giving him a correspondence where Helena learns of her brother's case.
14	14	"Helena quiere escapar"	February 13, 2014	13.5
Helena is determined to escape from Germán because of everything he has done to her, so take advantage of an opportunity to go out with him to be able to do so.
15	15	"Helena logra escapar"	February 14, 2014	15.3
Helena manages to escape from Germán but in the ship in which she is shipwrecked and dies, days later her family and friends make her a funeral in which Luis strikes Germán and blames him for his death.
16	16	"Helenita está viva"	February 17, 2014	15.1
Helena is alive because she never got on the boat she was planning to tackle, for the moment Germán is the only one who knows this, on the other hand Efraín must escape with his wife for the gambling debt he has with a dangerous man.
17	17	"Helenita trata de llegar a su casa"	February 18, 2014	15.2
Helena continues her journey to reach her home and helped by Pepe get an appointment with a music producer. Efraín returns to the house and Ana Julia proposes that he be the new administrator of the hacienda.
18	18	"Helenita trabaja para sobrevivir"	February 19, 2014	15.2
Helena begins to work in a restaurant to survive and is still excited about the supposed tour that will begin. Efrain and his wife plan to have Ana Julia no longer accept Helena in the family to keep more money.
19	19	"Helenita regresa a casa"	February 20, 2014	14.9
Helena returns to her mother's house but does not give her any welcome, only recriminates her and leaves her in the worst room of the house. Luis finds Flor and tries to get her back with him.
20	20	"Apuestas de juego"	February 21, 2014	14.7
Helena's life at home is increasingly difficult thanks to her mother and her brother, who loses the hacienda by betting on a game but the worst is the stroke that Luis suffers from seeing how they treat his daughter.
21	21	"La esposa de Efraín es raptada"	February 24, 2014	14.6
Helena finds work as a singer in a bar and her friend Álvaro is becoming more interested in her. Bethlehem Efraín's wife is kidnapped by the "Guajiro" because he does not want to pay the debt of the hacienda.
22	22	"Loaiza va a la cárcel"	February 25, 2014	14.6
Loaiza is unjustly sentenced for Miguel's death and must go to jail. Belén leaves Efraín for his interest in money and goes with the Guajiro. Ana Julia learns of Helena's true work at night.
23	23	"Helena tiene su primera hija"	February 26, 2014	15.1
Ana Julia expels Helena from her home who in a few days gives birth to a girl named Pilar, on the other hand Dr. Salas continues in his plan of conquest and is getting closer to the heart of Helena.
24	24	"Germán quiere la custodia de su hija"	February 27, 2014	15.2
The trial for the custody of Pilar begins, Germán uses against witnesses situations that favor Helena however the same one is called to declare but begins to be annoyed by the questions of the lawyer.
25	25	"Germán sufre un infarto"	February 28, 2014	14.6
Helena obtains the custody of her daughter thanks to the tests against Germá and the judge who obtained Álvaro and Maritza, this causes that Germán suffers a heart attack reason why it must leave the country for a treatment.
26	26	"Helenita sigue su sueño"	March 3, 2014	14.8
Helena continues her course to be a professional singer, however she must leave Álvaro aside. Efraín asks Helena for help because she is now a father and can not afford the expenses. Note: Until this episode Ana María Estupiñán plays Young Sofía Helena Vargas Marulanda "Helenita" in her youth.
Part 2
27	27	"Helena graba su primer disco"	March 4, 2014	15.5
A producer decides to record the first disc of Helena, nevertheless the producer desires something more of her in exchange of the recording. Álvaro is back in the country determined to find Helena.
28	28	"Helenita vuelve a trabajar"	March 5, 2014	14.1
Helena must return to work in Sergio's bar due to the loss of her record in the production company, Álvaro finds her again and wishes to be with her as the couple they were.
29	29	"El enemigo está muy cerca"	March 6, 2014	13.7
Helena must work with Clarisa, a woman who is making life impossible for her because she believes in a star and wants to pass over anyone to achieve her success.
30	30	"Helena vive el amor a flor de piel"	March 7, 2014	14.2
Helena and Álvaro are back together even though Pilar already knows about this situation and is quite upset that thanks to the insistence of Germán is thinking of going with him.
31	31	"Pilar se molesta con su mamá"	March 10, 2014	13.2
Pilar is still very upset with Helena because of the relationship she has with Álvaro. Efraín returns to Ana Julia because she is broken and works as a laborer although he continues with his lies about supposed business.
32	32	"Traicionada por su hermano"	March 11, 2014	13.0
Germán continues insisting on taking Pilar so that it appeals to Efraín so that it deceives to Helena with a signature and thus accomplishes its mission to take it of the country.
33	33	"Helena hace una prueba para grabar un disco"	March 12, 2014	14.0
Helena does the test in the record label and is a success for Mauro despite the altercation that has with Clarisa and its representative and worse still with the news of the supposed son that Álvaro expects.
34	34	"Una sana competencia"	March 13, 2014	14.5
Álvaro insists on performing a second pregnancy test on his ex-girlfriend. In the radio Helena and Clarisa they sing the same song but in different version so that the people is who decides which is better.
35	35	"La competencia continúa"	March 14, 2014	12.0
Clarisa and Helena continue competing to see which of its versions is the one that the public prefers so they present an interview without the authorization of Mauro in which they are dedicated to become indirect.
36	36	"Los quince de Pilar"	March 17, 2014	13.3
The day of the party of Pilar arrives by its fifteen years and already has list its suitcase to go with German although Helena finds out thanks to Beto the son of Efraín.
37	37	"Álvaro bailar el vals con Pilar"	March 18, 2014	13.9
Germán must leave the country because his plan is frustrated by Helena, however Álvaro pretends to be the Pope of Pilar to dance the waltz in his fifteen and thus to silence the comments of other people.
38	38	"Álvaro está enfermo"	March 19, 2014	12.5
Álvaro continually feels bad physically but does not pay attention to the symptoms, meanwhile Helena continues recording the songs that Graciela composed for its disc.
39	39	"Helena se casa en Ecuador"	March 20, 2014	13.5
Helena and Álvaro are married in Ecuador, when they arrive in the country they are greeted with a party by all their friends, except Virginia who is not going to receive a strong beating on the part of her husband.
40	40	"Álvaro confirma sus sospechas"	March 21, 2014	11.5
Álvaro receives medical tests that confirm diabetes as a cause of his continuous states of physical fainting. Helena is humiliated in an interview because of her marriage to Germán and Salas.
41	41	"Estrella le confiesa a Andrés que es su madre"	March 25, 2014	12.3
Estrella finally confesses to Andrés that she is his mother but he does not want to see her anymore. Helena's life is increasingly complicated by the excommunication and the interview she gave on the radio.
42	42	"Helena remota su disco"	March 26, 2014	13.2
Mauro retakes the disc of Helena with release date situation that excites her enough however who was her first husband, the man who hurt her dies to his side due to a heart attack.
43	43	"Helena lanza su disco"	March 27, 2014	13.1
Helena is very excited about the release of her album but again Clarisa tries to sabotage her event so she must change the promotion of the album.
44	44	"Helena es aclamada por su público"	March 28, 2014	12.8
Helena is acclaimed by people at her launch and even her mother sees her but does so because of her illness which causes her to lose track of what she does so she decides to go into a geriatric hospital.
45	45	"Helena se presenta en Bogotá"	March 31, 2014	14.6
Helena realizes its concert in Bogota and is a success also is given the gold disc by its great sale of discs. Gregory is the new representative of Helena despite his opposition.
46	46	"Helena logra asistir al grado de su hija"	April 1, 2014	14.7
Helena with the help of Rubén a politician of great influence, manages to reach the degree of its daughter. Virginia sleeps in Mauro's room because she has been fired and has nowhere to stay.
47	47	"Álvaro tiene una enfermedad terminal"	April 2, 2014	13.7
Helena takes her mother to live in her house and hires a nurse to take care of her. Álvaro suffers a crisis due to his illness and must tell Helena the truth about his condition.
48	48	"Helena sale de gira"	April 3, 2014	13.2
Helena begins the tour of concerts with the campaign of Rubén, who every moment takes advantage to be closer to her, this situation is taken advantage of by Efraín to take some photos for Clarisa who contracts it.
49	49	"El supuesto romance de Helena"	April 4, 2014	12.7
In the newspaper is published a photo of a supposed romance between Helena and Rubén situation that indisposes to Álvaro reason why is going to look for it but by a misunderstanding they are embraced them in the rain.
50	50	"Andrés tiene dobles intenciones"	April 7, 2014	12.5
Andrés the son of Estrella is taking advantage of his false approach to fulfill other objectives which have to do with the revolutionary group in which he is.
51	51	"Álvaro confiesa su infidelidad"	April 8, 2014	13.7
Álvaro tells Helena what happened to Beatriz, as expected, she wants to end her relationship, and she has a new problem with her daughter who wants to go and live with Giordi, a man much older than her.
52	52	"Renuncia irrevocable"	April 9, 2014	13.2
Mauro relinquishes the label by the constant orders of his boss to make the record to Clarisa and so does Graciela who goes with Mauro.
53	53	"Clarisa tiene el camino libre"	April 10, 2014	11.9
Gregory is the new manager of the label and now Clarisa has the free way to make his album. Ana Julia remembers who her daughter is and take the opportunity to talk like the mother and daughter they are.
54	54	"La mamá de Helena muere"	April 11, 2014	12.6
Helena's mother dies not before being proud to see her daughter on television. Andrés is rendered invalid by the shot he suffered for the attempted kidnapping.
55	55	"Helena está entre la espada y la pared"	April 14, 2014	13.0
Helena records her new album in the producer of Pepe but what she does not know is that she will be faced with a compilation of great hits that released her previous record situation that would bring serious problems to her new album.
56	56	"Pilar se casa"	April 15, 2014	13.2
Pilar marries Giordi and it is Álvaro who delivers her to the altar, this situation makes Helena weak for Álvaro and they end up sleeping together. Maritza loses the lawsuit against Enrique.
57	57	"Helena no quiere perdonar a Álvaro"	April 16, 2014	10.8
Despite the words and insistence of Álvaro, Helena does not want to see him again. Helena's new album recorded in Pepe's production company is at risk due to Cobo and Gregory playing the greatest hits album.
58	58	"Álvaro decide irse"	April 21, 2014	12.9
Álvaro decides to return to the United States with the firm intention of not returning, this causes that Helena decides not to lose it and it is going away to look for it to prevent that it leaves.
59	59	"El disco de Helena es un éxito"	April 22, 2014	14.3
The situation of Helena is improved again thanks to the concert tours obtained by Mauro and the sale of his last album but his greatest joy is the soon coming of his grandson.
60	60	"Helena sufre una herida en su corazón"	April 23, 2014	13.7
Helena suffers one of her greatest losses and sorrows when the love of her life dies, Dr. Álvaro José Salas, however also has great joys like her granddaughter and her musical recognition.
61	61	"Helena y Clarisa finalmente hacen las paces"	April 24, 2014	13.8
Helena happens to be reunited with Clarisa who is married and very changed, Vargas invites her to the Palace where her friend Rubén to do a presentation together.
62	62	"La historia de Helenita llega a su fin"	April 25, 2014	14.6
Hernando, the mute young man donates his liver to Helena saving his life. Her family and friends accompany her to a great concert in which she always leaves her soul in songs through her voice.

== International versions ==
Country/language	Local title	Date aired/premiered
Egypt	طريقي مسلسل طريقي	June 19, 2015

== Soundtrack ==
Song	Original interpreter	Performer (s)
"Señor"	Helenita Vargas	Ana María Estupiñán; Majida Issa
"Canta, canta, canta"	Helenita Vargas	Ana María Estupiñán
"Qué bonito amor"	José Alfredo Jiménez	Ana María Estupiñán
"Un mundo raro"	Rocío Dúrcal	Ana María Estupiñán
"Yo soy la aventurera" (female version)	Pedro Fernández	Ana María Estupiñán
«Deja que salga la luna»	Pedro Infante	Ana María Estupiñán
"Luz de luna"	Helenita Vargas	Ana María Estupiñán
"Amnesia"	Helenita Vargas	Majida Issa
"LLegando a ti"	José Alfredo Jiménez	Ana María Estupiñán
"Yo soy Helenita"	Helenita Vargas	Majida Issa
"Yo trataba a un casado"	Helenita Vargas	Majida Issa
"De carne y hueso"	Helenita Vargas	Majida Issa
"Si nos dejan"	Luis Miguel	Himself
"Estoy enamorada"	Helenita Vargas	Ana María Estupiñán
"Como te extraño mi amor"	Leo Dan	Marianne Schaller
"Compañero"	Helenita Vargas	Majida Issa
"Espérame en el cielo"	Pedro Vargas	Majida Issa
"De 7 a 9"	Vicente Fernández	Majida Issa; Marianne Schaller
"Ni loca"	Helenita Vargas	Majida Issa
"No te pido más"	Helenita Vargas	Majida Issa

== Awards and nominations ==
=== Premios Talento Caracol ===
Year	Award	Category	Recipients and nominees	Outcome
2015	Premios Talento Caracol	Best series or telenovela	La ronca de oro	Nominated
2015	Premios Talento Caracol	Best Lead Actress	Majida Issa	Nominated
2015	Premios Talento Caracol	Best Lead Actress	Ana María Estupiñán	Nominated
2015	Premios Talento Caracol	Best Lead Actor	Diego Cadavid	Won
2015	Premios Talento Caracol	Best Supporting Actress	Laura Garcia	Won
2015	Premios Talento Caracol	Best Supporting Actress	Marcela Benjumea	Nominated
2015	Premios Talento Caracol	Best Supporting Actress	Greeicy Rendón	Nominated
2015	Premios Talento Caracol	Best Actor Revelation / or Actress	Ángela Piedrahita	Nominated
2015	Premios Talento Caracol	Best Actress Antagonist	Marianne Schaller	Nominated
2015	Premios Talento Caracol	Best Actor Antagonist	Leonardo Acosta	Nominated
2015	Premios Talento Caracol	Best Kiss	Majida Issa and Diego Cadavid	Won
2015	Premios Talento Caracol	More Emotional Moment	Helena Canta para despedir	Won

=== Premios TVyNovelas ===
Year	Award	Category	Recipients and nominees	Outcome
2015	Premios TVyNovelas (Colombia)	Actress favorite cast of series	Viviana Serna Ramirez	Nominated
2015	Premios TVyNovelas (Colombia)	Best series	La ronca de oro	Won
2015	Premios TVyNovelas (Colombia)	Favorite Female Protagonists in series	Ana María Estupiñán	Nominated
2015	Premios TVyNovelas (Colombia)	Favorite Female Protagonists in series	Majida Issa	Nominated
2015	Premios TVyNovelas (Colombia)	Favorite Male Protagonist in Series	Diego Cadavid	Nominated
2015	Premios TVyNovelas (Colombia)	Favorite Villain Series	Laura García	Nominated
2015	Premios TVyNovelas (Colombia)	Favorite Villain Series	Marianne Schaller	Nominated
2015	Premios TVyNovelas (Colombia)	Favorite Villain Series	Leonardo Acosta	Nominated
2015	Premios TVyNovelas (Colombia)	Best Supporting actor	Alex Adamés	Nominated
2015	Premios TVyNovelas (Colombia)	Favorite musical theme telenovela	"Señor"	Won
2015	Premios TVyNovelas (Colombia)	Best Direction	Klych López	Won
2015	Premios TVyNovelas (Colombia)	Favorite soap opera librettist or series	Klych López	Nominated
