= Viviana Serna =

Colombian actress

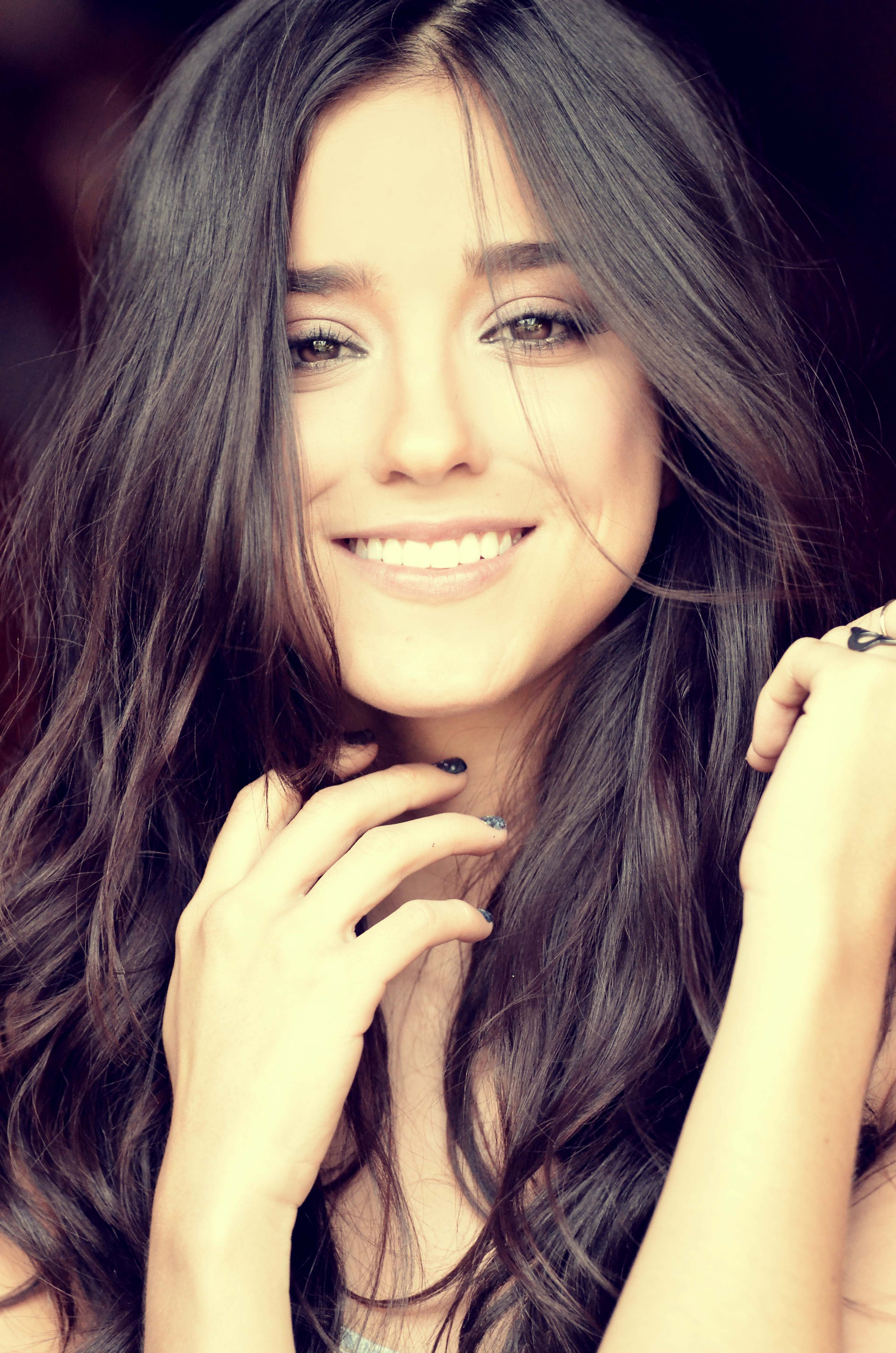
- Born: Viviana Serna Ramírez; August 26, 1990 (age 34); Cali, Colombia
- Occupation: Actress

Viviana Serna (born Viviana Serna Ramírez on August 26, 1990, in Cali, Colombia) is an actress. She is based in Mexico City.

Viviana Serna, born in Colombia, started her acting career at the age of 13 as a host for Colombian local TV. She quickly began working in theater and television, and at 19 years old, Viviana booked a series regular role in the TV series Confidencial. Soon after, she landed the role of “Solita” in La Bruja (TV series). She has also appeared in La viuda negra, La ronca de oro, ¿Quién Eres Tú?, and most recently, she started in the Mexican TV series El Señor de los Cielos and Guerra de ídolos.

Viviana played the role of "Giselle" in Between Sea and Land, a 2016 Sundance Film Festival award - winning movie. That same year, she won the award for Best Supporting Actress at the 2016 Scottsdale international film festival.

== Filmography ==
Television
Year	Title	Role	Notes	Ref.
2011	La bruja	Sola	26 episodes	
2012	La Ruta blanca	Janeth		
2012	¿Quién eres tú?	Gabriela Esquivel		
2013	La Madame	Unknown role	"Sandra la virgen" (Season 1, Episode 1)	
2014	La ronca de oro	Cecilia Hincapié		
2014	La viuda negra	Karla Otalvaro		
2014	Señora Acero	Guadalupe "Lupita" González	13 episodes	
2015	El Señor de los Cielos	Cristina Salgado	58 episodes	
2017	Guerra de ídolos	Belinda		
2016	Between Sea and Land			
2016	Por siempre Joan Sebastian	Nora		
2020	Narcos: Mexico	Guadalupe Leija Serrano	3 episodes	
