= Legionario (2025 film) =

2025 British-French film

Legionario is a 2025 British-French drama/thriller feature film directed by brothers David Cummings and Eric Cummings. Starring Sebastian Eslava, Valeria Caicedo, Julio Pachón, Camilo Amores, María del Rosario, and Alok Tewari, it was the first feature film ever to be shot within the premises of the French Foreign Legion.

== Plot ==
Jhon Lloreda, a former FARC guerrilla fighter from Colombia, is serving in Chad as part of the Operation Barkhane, as a corporal in the French Foreign Legion. His brother, known by the alias Lobo, is still part of the FARC guerrilla dissidents and is arrested in Cali with his wife Omaira and his five year old daughter. He agrees with police prosecutor Carol Polanía, a victim of the fictional 2009 Santa Rita bombing, to re-infiltrate the guerrilla and become an informant in exchange for a reduced sentence. However, when returning to his guerrilla camp, he is discovered by his leader Ramsés and trialled and executed by his comrades. Meanwhile, his brother Jhon returns to France and is promoted to sergeant. When Carol Polanía and Omaira receive no news of Lobo after a week, Omaira calls Jhon in France and threatens to reveal the truth about his past if he does not return to Colombia and help Carol Polanía find Lobo and Ramsés. After some hesitation and inquiring about the Legion policy of extraditing suspected terrorists, Jhon returns to Colombia and meets Carol Polanía.

Together, they interrogate various former acquaintances from Jhon's past as a guerrilla fighter. However, when they find Lobo's body in an abandoned guerrilla camp, Jhon decides to return to the Legion. But when Carol Polanía discovers Ramsés will be operated in a clinic in Cali a few days later, Jhon agrees to participate in his capture and arrest. Back in France, as he follows Ramsés' trial on the news, he decides to return to Colombia and testify. After declaring that Ramsés indeed gave the order for the Santa Rita bombing, he admits that he was the one who chose the location of the car bomb and that he detonated it, and apologises to Carol Polanía and the public. Five years later, Carol has abandoned working for the police and becomes a lecturer in law at the Universidad del Valle in Cali, and Jhon is finishing a six-year sentence in a low-security prison in Jamundí. Carol visits Jhon in prison, where he admits to her that he feels freer than ever before.

== Cast ==
- Sebastián Eslava as Jhon Lloreda, a corporal in the French Foreign Legion
- Valeria Caicedo as Carol Polanía, a prosecutor and former victim of the Santa Rita bombing
- Camilo Amores as Lobo, brother of Jhon Lloreda, who remained with the guerrilla dissidents after the 2016 Peace Treaty
- María del Rosario as Omaira, the wife of Lobo
- Julio Pachón as Ramsés, a charismatic guerrilla leader
- Fredy Morales as Acero, a former AUC paramilitary fighter turned legionnaire
- Palma Carrizales as Valentina, a prostitute and informant
- Alok Tewari as Scott Sierra, Ramsés' defence lawyer

== Production ==
=== Development ===
The idea of making a film about a Colombian in the French Foreign Legion came to brothers Eric and David Cummings while the former was on an internship in a hospital in Colombia and the latter training in the Legion as a reservist. The first versions of the script were inspired by the life of a legionnaire met by David Cummings who had escaped from the FARC and joined the French Foreign Legion. The brothers had attended the Lycée International de Saint-Germain-en-Laye and David had earned a master's degree in screenwriting before becoming a reservist in the Foreign Legion.

The screenplay was written by French screenwriter Élodie Lossy, while screenwriter Jamie Nuttgens, who was lecturer in screenwriting at the University of Oxford while David Cummings was studying creative writing there, served as executive producer and contributed to the writing.

Legionario is a drama/thriller film directed and produced by David and Eric Cummings, and is a British-French co-production, through British production company Orpheum Films co-produced by the British company Orpheum Films and the Colombian company Lobo Productions. Many participants in the project also invested in it, and the brothers also handled casting and location scouting themselves to keep costs down. The total budget was around €250,000. The project features several product placement collaborations with several companies, including Swiss watchmaker Ball, American smartphone manufacturer Purism, and Spanish airline Plus Ultra.

=== Filming ===
Award-winning Colombian cinematographer Mauricio Vidal was director of photography for the film.

Principal photography took place in July 2024 in Villavicencio, Restrepo, Puerto López, and in Acacias, Colombia, while three days with a reduced team were shot in the 13th Demi-Brigade of the French Foreign Legion in La Cavalerie, France, as well as in the village of Caunes-Minervois, France. Filming for the first part took place in the Larzac region of France.

It was the first feature film to be shot within the premises of the French Foreign Legion.

== Release ==
Legionario, had its world premiere on 6 November 2025 in Villavicencio, Colombia, at the Festival Internacional de Cine de Villavicencio CRISOL.

Legionario was selected in competition for the 10th edition of the Riviera International Film Festival in Sestri Levante, Italy, and had its European premiere there in May 2026.

OneTwoThree Media is handling distribution.

== Reception and accolades ==
The film won the Audience award and the Best Director awards at the Riviera International Film Festival, and received positive reviews by the local press.
