= Greeicy =

Colombian actress and singer (born 1992)

- Greeicy at the 2026 Latin Grammy Awards
- Born: Greeicy Yeliana Rendón Ceballos; 30 October 1992 (age 34); Cali, Valle del Cauca, Colombia
- Occupations: Actress; singer; model; dancer
- Years active: 2007–present
- Partner: Mike Bahía (2012–present)
- Children: 1
- Musical career
- Genres: Balada; Pop; Bachata
- Instrument: Vocals

Greeicy Yeliana Rendón Ceballos (born 30 October 1992), known mononymously as Greeicy ([ˈɡɾejsi]), is a Colombian actress and singer.

== Early life and career ==
Greeicy remained in Cali for the first five years of her childhood, until her parents, Luis Alberto Rendón and Lucy Ceballos, decided to move to Bogota. Since she was a child, she has had an interest in interpretation and music, and took classes in acting, piano, flute, guitar and singing.

Her first onscreen appearance was in the 2007 edition of the reality show for talent children's Factor Xs, being sponsored by the singer and composer José Gaviria. Although she did not win, her appearance in that program gave her the opportunity to be included in a casting, which meant entering the world of acting. Her first role as an actress was in 2009 in the telenovela, Cuando salga el sol as Carolina Parra, the daughter of the main couple. The following year, she was chosen by Sergio Cabrera to play Sierva in the telenovela La Pola.

In January 2011, she played Flor Porras in Correo de inocentes. Months later, she joined the cast of ¿Dónde está Elisa?, playing Marcela. adaptation of a homonymous Chilean telenovela of 2009.

In 2013, she played Johanna Barrera, in La prepago. Later, she was chosen by the producers of RCN Televisión and TeleVideo as the protagonist of Chica vampiro. The series premiered on 14 May 2013. Although it did not have a good reception in Colombia, instead it was a success in Italy and France.

In 2014, she was announced as the youth protagonist of the telenovela La ronca de oro, based on the life of the Colombian singer, Helenita Vargas. Also she was part of the Colombian version of The Wonderful Years, in Spanish titled Los años maravillosos. In 2015, she starred in Tiro de gracia. Then she was part of Esmeraldas, where she played Paula Guáqueta Guerrero.

In 2016, she was in "Las Vega's," a Colombian adaptation of the Chilean series of the same name, and was announced as one of the protagonists of the adaptation of the American series Revenge. RCN Televisión decided to postpone the premiere for 2017. The program finally debuted on 2 March 2017 in Argentina, on Channel El Trece and on 6 March in Colombia, with the title of Venganza.

== Personal life ==
On 23 December 2021, Greeicy and Mike Bahia announced through a collaboration called “Att: Amor” that they were expecting their first child together.

== Filmography ==
Year	Title	Role	Notes
2007	Factor Xs	Herself	Contestant
2009	Cuando salga el sol	Carolina Parra	Television debut
2010	La Pola	Sierva	Recurring role
2010	Mujeres al límite	Claudia Patricia Arias	Actress of a chapter
2010	Correo de inocentes	Flor Porras	Recurring role
2012	¿Dónde está Elisa?	Marcela	Recurring role
2011	Primera dama	Daniela Astudillo	Co-lead role
2013	La prepago	Johana	Recurring role
2013	Chica vampiro	Daisy O'Brian McLaren	Lead role
2014	La ronca de oro	Pilar Hincapié Vargas	Co-lead role
2014	Los años maravillosos	Karen González	Co-lead role
2015	Tiro de gracia	Veronica Bernal/ Esmeralda	Lead Role
2016	Las Vega's	Camila	Lead Role
2017	Venganza	Gabriela Piedrahita	Recurring role
2022	Ritmo Salvaje	Karina	Lead role

== Discography ==
=== Studio albums ===
Title	Studio album details	Peak chart positions
Title	Studio album details	US Latin
Baila	Released: May 17, 2019; Label: Universal Music Latin; Format: Digital download, CD	20
La Carta	Released: March 4, 2022; Label: Universal Music Latin; Format: Digital download, CD	–
Yeliana	Released: February 16, 2024; Label: Universal Music Latin; Format: CD, digital download, streaming	–
Candela	Released: May 22, 2026; Label: Universal Music Latin; Format: Digital download, streaming	–

=== Singles ===
==== As lead artist ====
List of singles as lead artist, with selected chart positions and certifications, showing year released and album name
Title	Year	Peak chart positions									Certifications	Album
Title	Year	COL	ARG	ECU	FRA	MEX	PAR	SPA	URU	US Latin	Certifications	Album
"Brindemos"	2017	—	—	—	—	—	—	—	—	—		Non-album singles
"Error"	2017	—	—	—	—	—	—	—	—	—		Non-album singles
"Despierta"	2017	—	—	—	—	—	—	—	—	—		Non-album singles
"Amantes" (featuring Mike Bahía)	2017	3	—	—	—	1	—	—	—	—		Non-album singles
"Más Fuerte"	2018	4	—	—	—	5	—	—	—	—	RIAA: Platinum (Latin)	Baila
"No Te Equivoques" (with The Rudeboyz)	2018	—	—	—	—	—	—	—	—	—		Non-album singles
"Perfecta" (with Feid)	2018	—	—	—	—	—	—	—	—	—		Non-album singles
"Ya Para Qué"	2018	—	—	—	—	—	—	—	—	—		Baila
"Perdón" (with David Bisbal)	2018	—	58	—	—	—	—	31	—	—	PROMUSICAE: Platinum; RIAA: Gold (Latin)	En Tus Planes
"Jacuzzi" (with Anitta)	2018	55	93	—	—	—	—	—	—	—	PMB: Platinum; ASINCOL: Platinum; RIAA: Gold (Latin)	Baila
"Esta Noche" (with Mike Bahía)	2018	—	—	—	—	—	—	—	—	—	RIAA: Platinum (Latin)	Navegando
"Ganas"	2019	—	—	—	—	—	—	—	—	—		Baila
"Bien Fancy" (with Fuego)	2019	—	—	—	—	—	—	—	—	—		Non-album single
"Destino" (with Nacho)	2019	4	—	—	—	—	—	100	—	—	RIAA: Platinum (Latin)	Baila
"Domingo (Remix)" (with Reykon, Cosculluela and Rauw Alejandro)	2019	—	—	—	—	—	—	—	—	—		Non-album single
"22" (with TINI)	2019	—	8	5	—	—	70	—	5	—	CAPIF: Platinum; CUD: Gold	Tini Tini Tini
"A Mí No"	2019	—	—	—	—	—	—	—	—	—		Baila
"Mala Fama" (Remix) (with Danna Paola)	2019	—	—	—	—	—	—	—	—	—		Sie7e+
"Solo Mía" (with Cali Y El Dandee and Jhay Cortez)	2019	—	—	—	—	—	—	—	—	—		Non-album single
"I Love You (432 Hz)" (with Maejor)	2019	—	—	—	86	—	—	—	—	—		Vol 1: Frequency
"Minifalda" (with Juanes)	2019	—	—	—	—	—	—	—	—	25		Non-album singles
"Te Estas Enamorando de Mi" (with Luciano Pereyra)	2019	—	20	—	—	—	—	—	—	—		Non-album singles
"Locos Damentes" (with Gusi and Mike Bahía)	2019	—	—	—	—	—	—	—	—	—		Desde Mi Ventana
"Aguardiente" ( solo or remix with Mariah Angeliq and Darell)	2019	—	—	—	—	—	—	—	—	—		Non-album singles
"Si Tu Amor No Vuelve" (with Mike Bahía)	2020	—	—	—	—	—	—	—	—	—		Non-album singles
"Antídoto" (with Antonio José)	2020	—	—	—	—	—	—	18	—	—		Antídoto2
"Los Besos"	2020	9	—	—	—	—	—	—	—	—	RIAA: Platinum (Latin)	La Carta
"Los Consejos"	2020	—	—	—	—	—	—	—	—	—		La Carta
"Desesperado (Voy A Tomar)" (with Joey Montana and Cali Y El Dandee)	2020	62	—	—	—	—	—	—	—	—		Non-album single
"Contigo" (with Nacho)	2020	—	—	—	—	—	—	—	—	—		De Vuelta A Casa
"Cuando Te Vi"	2020	—	—	—	—	—	—	—	—	—		La Carta
"Ravin'" (with Charly Black and Sean Paul)	2021	—	—	—	—	—	—	—	—	—		So Many Reasons
"Lejos Conmigo " (with Alejandro Sanz)	2021	—	—	—	—	—	—	—	—	—		La Carta
"2005" (with Fonseca and Cali Y El Dandee)	2021	—	—	—	—	—	—	—	—	—		Viajante
"Te Creí" (with Cultura Profética)	2021	—	—	—	—	—	—	—	—	—		La Carta
"Att: Amor" (with Mike Bahía)	2022	—	—	—	—	—	—	—	—	—		La Carta
"Tóxico"	2022	—	—	—	—	—	—	—	—	—		La Carta
"La Ducha (Remix)" (with Elena Rose and María Becerra featuring Becky G and TINI)	2022	—	—	—	—	—	—	—	—	—		Non-album single
"Mi Pecadito" (with Mike Bahía)	2023	—	—	—	—	—	—	—	—	—		Contigo
"Que Me Quiera"	2023	—	—	—	—	—	—	—	—	—		Yeliana
"Lokita"	2023	—	—	—	—	—	—	—	—	—		Yeliana
"I Try For You"	2023											Yeliana
"Química"	2023											Yeliana
"Zha" (with Danny Ocean)	2023											Yeliana
"Espejo"	2023											Non-album singles
"Las Burbujas del Jacuzzi" (with India Martínez and Lele Pons)	2024											Non-album singles
"De A Poco"	2024											Yeliana
"Kai"	2024											Non-album singles
"A Veces a Besos" (solo or remix with Kapo)	2024											Non-album singles
"Que Te Pasó?" (with Jay Wheeler)	2024											Non-album singles
"Efímero"	2024											Non-album singles
"Todavía" (with Boza)	2025											San Blas
"Macarrones con Queso" (with Borja)	2025											Non-album singles
"Limonar"	2025											Candela
"Estas Ganas"	2025											Candela
"Quiero +"	2025											Candela
"Cómo fue?" (with Zhamira)	2025											Curita Para El Corazón
"Le Pedí a Dios" (with Jhay P)	2025											Non-album single
"Curándote"	2025											Candela
"Mantis" (with Cultura Profética)	2026											Candela
"Yapaque" (with Farruko and Steve Aoki)	2026											TBA
"—" denotes items that did not chart or were not released in that territory.

==== As featured artist ====
List of singles as featured artist, with selected chart positions and certifications, showing year released and album name
Title	Year	Peak chart positions			Album
Title	Year	COL	MEX	US Latin	Album
"Olvidé Tu Nombre" (Kenai featuring Greeicy)	2017	—	—	—	Non-album single
"Lo malo (Remix)" (Aitana and Ana Guerra featuring Greeicy and TINI)	2018	—	—	—	Reflexión
"Cartagena" (Steve Aoki featuring Greeicy)	2023	—	—	—	Hiroquest 2: Double Helix

=== Promotional singles ===
List of promotional singles
Title	Year	Album
"Silent Night"	2020	Feliz Christmas (Vol. 1)

=== Guest appearances ===
Title	Year	Other artists	Album
"No Pasa Nada"	2020	Pitizion	La Piti
"Le Viene Bien"	2023	Andrés Cepeda	Décimo Cuarto
"Si Superamos Esta Noche"	2024	LAGOS	Alta Fidelidad
"Guatapé"	2024	Elena Rose	En Las Nubes - Con Mis Panas
"Amiga Mía"	2025	Karol G	Tropicoqueta
"En Tu Marea"	2025	Goyo	Pantera

== Awards ==
Year	Award	Category	Work	Result
2017	Premios TVyNovelas	Best Supporting Actress	Las Vegas	Won
2018	MTV Millennial Awards	Artist With More Attitude		Won
2019	Heat Latin Music Awards	Best Collaboration	Amantes	Won
2019	Latino Show Music Awards	Best Urban Pop Artist		Won
2019	Latin Grammy Award	Best New Artist		Nominated
2019	Premios Juventud	Best Reality Show Break-Out Artist		Nominated
2020	Premios Juventud	Best dance choreography in a music video	Aguardiente	Nominated
2020	Latino Show Music Awards	Best Pop Artist		Won
2020	Latino Show Music Awards	Best Urban Pop Artist		Won
2020	Latino Show Music Awards	Best Pop Song	Los Besos	Won
