= Toni, la Chef =

- Genre: Telenovela
- Directed by: Maria Eugenia Perera
- Starring: Ana María Estupiñán; Patricio Gallardo; Josette Vidal; Luis Álvarez Lozano
- Opening theme: "Hey Chef" by Sebastián Mellino
- Country of origin: Colombia
- Original language: Spanish
- No. of episodes: 40

Original release
- Network: Nickelodeon Latin America
- Release: May 4 – July 9, 2015

Related
- Talia in the Kitchen

Toni, la Chef, is a Latin American telenovela produced by Nickelodeon Latin America. On April 29, 2015, ClaroVideo published three episodes before the premiere of the series.

== Plot ==
This series follows the adventures of Toni Parra, a bold and rebellious teenager who has a passion for cooking, as well as a great skill to get into trouble. As soon as she moves to Miami to live with her grandmother, Toni will face a new world, in which nothing seems to be what it is. The "magical" spices and condiments used for cooking have unexpected effects, the neighbouring restaurant has declared war and her grandmother continually tries to "tame her".

== Cast ==
- Ana María Estupiñán as Toni Parra
- Patricio Gallardo as Nacho Rosales
- Luis Álvarez Lozano as Leandro Miranda
- Josette Vidal as Sara Fuccinelli
- Alma Matrecito as Diana Ochoa
- Ángela Rincón as Olivia González
- Jonathan Freudman as Frenchie Fuccinelli
- Jorge Eduardo García as Dante
- Samuel Sadovnik as Bigotes
- Alonzo Arellano as Juan El Futbolista
- Frank Fernandez as Pedro Sue Chef
- Jeannete Lehr as Dolores
- Lucia Gomez Robledo as Teresa
- Alejandro Toro as Gaucho

== Awards and nominations ==
| Year | Award | Category | Nominated | Result |
|---|---|---|---|---|
| 2015 | Kids Choice Awards México | Favorite Actor | Patricio Gallardo | Nominated |
| 2015 | Kids Choice Awards México | Favorite Actor | Luis Álvarez | Nominated |
| 2015 | Kids Choice Awards México | Favorite Actress | Ana María Estupiñán | Nominated |
| 2015 | Kids Choice Awards México | Favorite Program or Series | Toni, la Chef | Nominated |
