= Nadie me quita lo bailao =

Colombian telenovela

- Genre: Biographical; Telenovela
- Starring: Julián Román
- Country of origin: Colombia
- Original language: Spanish
- No. of seasons: 1
- No. of episodes: 49

Production
- Production locations: Cali, Colombia

Original release
- Network: RCN Televisión
- Release: 7 May – 19 July 2018

Related
- Paraíso Travel

Nadie me quita lo bailao also known as Zumba in the rest of the world, is a Colombian biographical telenovela that premiered on RCN Televisión on 7 May 2018 and concluded on 19 July 2018. The show is based on the life on the Colombian dancer Beto Pérez. It stars Julián Román as the title character.

== Cast ==
- Julián Román as Beto Pérez
- Alejandra Ávila as Sandra Izquierdo
- Silvia de Dios as Liliana Guzmán
- Luz Estrada as Gloria Pérez
- Fernando Solórzano as Don Carlos
- Wayra Schreiber as Sandra Guzmán
- Jo Pratta as Gloria Pérez
- Pedro Calvo as Ronni Ramírez
- Erik Joel Rodríguez as Juan Tróchez
- Omar Murillo as El Negro Mina
- María Emilia Kamper as Emma
- Jaider Villa as Luis Velandia
- Kepa Amuchastegui as Don Pedro
- Isabella Santiago as Mónica Tróchez
- Alejandra Taborda as Karina Asprilla
- María Claudia Torres as Leonor
- Libby Brien as Laura
- Amanda Peter as Lina Trochez
- Julieth Restrepo as Petra Cifuentes
- Arthur Garbe as Richard
- Philip Hersh as Don Carlos
- Carlos Manuel Vesga as Daniel
- Alejandro Palacio as Sandro
- Patricia Castañeda as Rebeca
- Mijail Mulkay as Camacho
- Shirly Gómez as Salomé
- Charlotte de Casabianca as Viviana
