= Paraíso Travel =

Colombian telenovela

- Genre: Telenovela
- Based on: Paraíso Travel by Jorge Franco
- Starring: Laura Londoño; Sebastián Eslava
- Country of origin: Colombia
- Original language: Spanish
- No. of seasons: 1
- No. of episodes: 72

Production
- Production locations: Medellín, Colombia; New York City, United States; Caracas, Venezuela; Guadalajara, Mexico
- Camera setup: Multi-camera
- Production companies: RCN Televisión; Sony Pictures Television

Original release
- Network: RCN Televisión
- Release: 29 January – 4 May 2018

Related
- Nadie me quita lo bailao

Paraíso Travel is a Colombian telenovela that premiered on RCN Televisión on 29 January 2018, and concluded on 4 May 2018 based on the book of the same name by the Colombian author Jorge Franco. It stars Laura Londoño and Sebastián Eslava as the titular's character.

== Synopsis ==
This series tells the story of Reina Acuña a young beautiful Colombian girl that after receives a phone call from her mother, Raquel Zuluaga, she starts looking for her in the streets of Medellín, just to find out that the women has fled to New York to die in the north.

Reina boards a new journey to the States that leads her to deal with more than a couple complicated situations while looking for her mom, such as having her visa rejected and getting in touch with an illegal migration agency called Paraíso Travel.

== Themes ==
This RCN's production relates to the American Dream from a Colombian perspective, to approach themes such as love, family, friends and couples. The joys, sadness and hazards of Paraíso Travel have the streets and venues of Medellín and New York City as a stage.

The series is based in the homonymous novel by Jorge Franco as well as the 2008 movie by Simón Brand, whose soundtrack was composed by the Colombian singer and song writer Fonseca. The story covers the unreal day by day choices an immigrant has to make in order to achieve their dreams in the United States.

== Cast ==
- Laura Londoño as Reina Acuña
- Sebastián Eslava as Marlon Cruz
- Juan Diego Sánchez as Lucas
- Katherine Vélez as Raquel Zuluaga
- Cristian Tappan as Gonzalo Acuña
- Juan Pablo Posada as Iván
- Michel Guillo as Giovanny
- Lucho Velasco as Victor
- Mario Parra as Pastor
- Sandra Reyes as Cecilia
- Julio Sánchez as Ramón Cruz
- Carlos Kajú as Paco
- Aída Morales as Fabiola
- Marcela Benjumea as Leonor
- Nadia Rowinsky as La Caleña
- Adriana Osorio as Patricia
- Juana Arboleda as Maritza
- Carlos Congote as Jeremy
- Fiona Horsey as DEA Agent: Demi
- Fernando Arévalo as Guillermo
- Alexis Calvo as El Enano
- Mauricio Gonzalez as DEA Agent: Alex
- Franártur Duque as Bellhop
- Adriana Silva as Adriana
- Vilma Vera as Sonia Ríos
