= Talia in the Kitchen =

- Genre: Teen comedy Telenovela
- Created by: Catharina Ledeboer
- Directed by: Clayton Boen and Maria E. Perera
- Starring: Maria Quezada; Liam Obergfoll; Joshua Hoffman; Ellis Jackson; Miguel Luciano; Gail Soltys; Galilea La Salvia; Jeannette Lehr; Ethan Estrada; William Wilson
- Country of origin: United States
- Original language: English
- No. of seasons: 1
- No. of episodes: 40 (list of episodes)

Production
- Executive producers: José Vicente Scheuren; Tatiana Rodríguez
- Producer: Maria A Mavares
- Camera setup: Videotape; Single-camera
- Running time: 25 minutes
- Production company: Cinemat

Original release
- Network: Nickelodeon
- Release: July 6 – December 23, 2015

Related
- Toni, la Chef

Talia in the Kitchen is an American telenovela-formatted comedy that premiered on Nickelodeon on July 6, 2015 and ended on December 23, 2015. It was an adaptation of the Nickelodeon Latin American telenovela, Toni, la Chef, and was created by Catharina Ledeboer, who was the head writer of Grachi, Every Witch Way & WITS Academy.

On March 4, 2015, Nickelodeon ordered 40 episodes for the series, all the episodes making up the first season. The series' 40 episode season was split into 2 halves, with the first 20 episodes airing from July 6 to 30, 2015. After a sneak peek on November 25, 2015, the final 19 episodes aired November 30 to December 23, 2015. On January 12, 2016, it was confirmed that the show was cancelled.

== Plot ==
14-year-old Talia Parra has her passion for cooking take flight when she and her younger sister visit their grandmother in Miami for the summer and later move in with her. With help from her new friends and her late father's magical spices, Talia revives business in her family restaurant by cooking truly life-changing meals that are just what each customer needs.

== Cast and characters ==
- Talia Parra (Maria Quezada): An optimistic girl who loves everything and is fond of cooking at Lola's, her family's restaurant. She is rivals with Debbie Fuccinelli. Talia finds magic spices hidden by her father and discovers that she is a SpiceMaster, able to use these spices to their full effect.
- Deborah "Debbie" Fuccinelli (Gail Soltys): Talia's main competitor who works at the rival restaurant Fuccinelli's. Debbie is insecure, and becomes obsessed with destroying Lola's to prove that she is a better chef than Talia.
- Julie Parra (Galilea La Salvia): Talia's younger sister, a serious and mature child prodigy who proves to be a master chef.
- Rudy Rosales (Joshua Hoffman): Talia's best friend and later love interest. He is great at fixing things, and popularizes Mexican music in Miami.
- Valerie Landry (Ellis Ann Jackson): Talia's best friend, who compulsively tells the truth and is afraid of committing any crimes.
- Tyson Fuccinelli (Liam Obergfoll): Debbie's twin brother, and the love interest of Talia.
- Federico "Frenchie" Fuccinelli (Miguel Luciano): Debbie's cousin and the head chef of the Fuccinelli's Restaurant, who is shown to be an egotistical perfectionist.
- Dolores Parra (Jeannette Lehr): Talia and Julie's grandmother who taught Talia how to cook. She was the owner of Lola's until it was closed down by the Fuccinellis.
- Rocky Palroso (Ethan Estrada): A 12-year-old boy whom Julie meets at the local community center. He has a crush on Julie, and has helped the Parra family many times, always stating that he "knows a guy."
- Avery (Marika Dumancas): Debbie's vain and sarcastic best friend.
- Jayden (William Wilson) and Michael Grubb (Cooper Rowe): Two brothers introduced in the episode "Storm and Grubb". Together they run a food truck called Brothers in Grubb. Jayden has a crush on Talia but must compete with her because they are both SpiceMasters.
- Will (Tommy Goodman): A chef who used to work at Lola's before moving to Fuccinelli's. He later returned to Lola's to steal their magic spices.

Tyler Alvarez	Diego Rueda 1 episode, 2015
Paola Andino	Emma Alonso 1 episode, 2015
Paris Smith	Maddie Van Pelt 1 episode, 2015
Autumn Wendel	Sophie Johnson 1 episode, 2015
Zoey Burger	Gigi Rueda 1 episode, 2015
Jevon White	Water Works Supervisor 1 episode, 2015
Mike Boland	Reporter 1 episode, 2015
Madelin Marchant	Dolores Fan 1 episode, 2015
Michael Jacques	Mean director 1 episode, 2015
Liliana Moyano	Carmen 1 episode, 2015
Jerry Sommer	Desk Guard 1 episode, 2015
Ryan Morgan	Vincent 1 episode, 2015
John Cassarino	Police Officer 1 episode, 2015
Allison Molina	Girl 1 1 episode, 2015
Sebastian Lombardo	EMT 1 episode, 2015
Michael Dicarluccio	Sous Chef 1 episode, 2015

== Episodes ==
No.	Title	Directed by	Written by	Original release date	Prod. code	U.S. viewers (millions)
1	"And Spice Makes Nice"	Clayton Boen & Maria E. Perera	Catharina Ledeboer	July 6, 2015	101	0.96
This begins with Talia cooking up a storm and listening to music. She gets a text from her grandmother, Dolores, who is excited that she and her younger sister Julie are going to be staying with her for a month. Eventually, she gets interrupted by her Aunt Tilly, making a mess in the process. The next morning, she has to clean up the kitchen, when Julie comes in. They talk for a bit, the conversation revealing that both of their parents are dead. Later, Tilly drops the two off at Dolores', where Talia discovers that her family restaurant, Lola's, has been shut down. Dolores promises to explain everything later, and they go inside. Across the street are Debbie and her cousin Frenchie, who are worried that Talia will reopen Lola's as their family owns Fuccinelli's Restaurant. Once in their house, their neighbor Rudy Rosales introduces himself and proceeds to try to show off to Talia by carrying her bags. Dolores shows Talia and Julie their room and lets Rudy show Talia around. They try to break into Lola's, but it's blocked off, so Rudy goes to check out the back entrance. Valerie Landry goes up to Talia and hugs her, reminding her about how they used to play together when they were kids. Rudy takes them around back where Talia picks the lock and they go in. They reach the back room where Talia finds her dad's old spices hidden in the walls. She shoves them in her bag, but gets in trouble with Dolores as Valerie got her for "help" because she was scared. The next day, she blames Dolores for her breaking into the restaurant because she still hasn't told her what happened. Dolores gives her and Julie breakfast, where they have to act like it's edible. That day they go to the community center to sign up for classes. Rudy is there and is helping Talia when she sees Tyson Fuccinelli come in. Debbie arrives and is putting up a poster for a cooking class Frenchie is teaching, and Talia decides to sign up. When she approaches Debbie, she doesn't get a warm welcome. While signing up, Debbie bashes her and Dolores from a few feet away, which angers Talia so much she takes Rudy's drinks and dumps them on Debbie's head. Later, she and Rudy are waiting in her living room for Dolores to come home after her meeting about Talia. Surprisingly, she is not banned from the community center, but Dolores wants her to apologize. Talia uses her father's spices to make a treat and goes into the Fuccinelli's kitchen. She gets annoyed when Debbie insults her, so she puts her food down and leaves. Tyson goes after her. Frenchie and Debbie try out Talia's food, and unbeknownst to anyone, the spices cause them to like her for the time being and regret what they did to Lola's.
2	"Sugar Rush"	Maria E. Perera	Catharina Ledeboer	July 7, 2015	102	0.94
After the Parras discover that the Fuccinellis were responsible for closing Lola's, the feud between the two families grow.
3	"Don't Cry over Spilt Tres Leches"	Maria E. Perera	Catharina Ledeboer	July 8, 2015	103	0.96
To advertise Lola's, Rudy puts up posters at the community center to attract people, but Frenchie later takes them down. Talia is used as bait to distract Dolores as the posters are getting set up. Julie gets some help from Rocky, a famous student from Miami.
4	"It's Raining Spices"	Maria E. Perera	Catharina Ledeboer	July 9, 2015	104	1.06
Things do not go as planned during Lola's unofficial opening, as the food gets the customers in an overexcited mood.
5	"A Cat Named Bechamel"	Maria E. Perera	Catharina Ledeboer	July 10, 2015	105	0.94
When she learns that if Lola's closes again, the building will be lost, Dolores keeps this a big secret from Talia. Rudy takes interest in Talia by developing a crush on her.
6	"Fowl Play"	Maria E. Perera	Catharina Ledeboer	July 13, 2015	106	1.10
Lola's is in danger of being shut down again after the Fuccinelli's latest prank featuring chickens. Tyson tries to make amends with Talia and her friends.
7	"Every Witch Lola's"	Clayton Boen & Maria E. Perera	Catharina Ledeboer	July 14, 2015	107	1.12
While Emma tries to restore Daniel's memory at Lola's, Talia soon bonds with Daniel and prepares a special dish for him that may just be the trick. Note: This is a crossover with Every Witch Way, preceded by their episode "Lunch at Lola's".
8	"Spice-o-Matic"	Maria E. Perera	Catharina Ledeboer	July 15, 2015	108	1.16
Talia discovers that the spices are magic and learns more about them.
9	"The Open to End All Opens"	Maria E. Perera	Catharina Ledeboer	July 17, 2015	109	0.98
Talia is trapped in the vents after pulling a prank on Fuccinelli's with superglue, and she is in danger of missing Lola's grand reopening. Frenchie deals with the aftermath of Talia's prank
10–11	"Spice Me Up"	Maria E. Perera	Catharina Ledeboer	July 20, 2015	110-111	0.66 (110); 0.62 (111)
Talia cooks food for herself using the spices. Meanwhile, Tyson soon asks Talia to go out on a date, and Frenchie finds out that Talia was responsible for sabotaging Fuccinelli's. Note: This is a one-hour special episode.
12	"The Last Enchilada"	Maria E. Perera	Catharina Ledeboer	July 21, 2015	112	0.93
Frenchie goes over to Lola's to show Talia, Tyson, Rudy, Julie, Valerie, Dolores, and Rocky the video footage of Talia gluing kitchen appliances down in Fuccinelli's kitchen. Tyson, Rudy, Julie, Valerie, Dolores, and Rocky are all disappointed Talia would stoop so low to pull the prank that she did in Fuccinelli's kitchen. Talia feels the aftermath of being caught doing the prank, and wants to earn Frenchie, Dolores, and Julie's forgiveness back.
13	"Cupcake Wars"	Maria E. Perera	Catharina Ledeboer	July 22, 2015	113	0.74
Talia bakes special cupcakes with the spices to earn Frenchie's forgiveness, and Frenchie eats one, but Tyson eats a cupcake as well, his niceness making his soccer team to lose and his friend Chris upset.
14	"The Spoon"	Maria E. Perera	Catharina Ledeboer	July 23, 2015	114	0.83
The Spoon food critic eats at Lola's. Meanwhile, the reactions Talia's food gets arouse suspicion in Debbie and Frenchie.
15	"Skunk-en Souffle"	Maria E. Perera	Catharina Ledeboer	July 24, 2015	115	1.06
Dolores reveals the spices' dangerous effects to Talia. Elsewhere, Frenchie lets Debbie run Fuccinelli's kitchen for one night.
16	"Prote-Spice"	Maria E. Perera	Catharina Ledeboer	July 27, 2015	116	0.84
Talia and the gang search for Julie when she hides from Aunt Tilly.
17	"Spice Lesson"	Maria E. Perera	Catharina Ledeboer	July 28, 2015	117	0.79
Dolores wants Talia to return the magic spices because she thinks it's not right to control others.
18	"Go Bake or Go Home"	Maria E. Perera	Catharina Ledeboer	July 29, 2015	118	1.19
Aunt Tilly arrives to bring Talia and Julie back to Boston. Meanwhile, Will makes spaghetti with some of his own spices, which were magic like Talia's. Frenchie eats it, which puts him under Will's control; when Frenchie hears the word "snap," he will go steal Talia's spices for Will, and when he hears the word "meltdown," he will forget everything that happened.
19–20	"Spice Heist"	Maria E. Perera	Catharina Ledeboer	July 30, 2015	119–120	1.12 (119); 0.95 (120)
Dolores allows Talia to use the spices in her food to make Aunt Tilly leave Miami without her and Julie. Talia and Tyson almost share their first kiss, but they are distracted by Dolores throwing water on them. Before the Golden Ladle cooking competition, Will comes to Frenchie and says, "Snap"; this word sends Frenchie to Lola's to steal the magic spices. Talia and Debbie compete in the Golden Ladle, which is hosted by Chef Lorena Garcia, against many chefs until they compete against each other the next day. Debbie, however, wins because Talia did not have the main ingredient for the dish. Despite this, Chef Lorena still tells Talia about her good cooking. Immediately after, the lights malfunction, and it is announced that a big hurricane is coming towards Miami. Everyone shelters in the community center, but soon, when Dolores quickly leaves, Talia goes to Lola's to fetch Julie's pet skunk Priscilla. Dolores returns and thinks Talia is lost. Tyson goes out to find Talia, but Debbie tries to get him to stop, and he won't, so she calls the name of Frenchie, who tackles Tyson and drags him away from the exit. Talia reaches Lola's, successfully gets Priscilla, and also gets the spices just in case, but she soon has an encounter with Will, who takes the spices from her. At the end of the episode, Talia is trapped in Lola's by the hurricane. Note: in some regions, this episode was split in two half-hour-long episodes, with the first part titled 'The Golden Ladle', and the second titled 'Hurricane Ophelia'.
21	"After The Storm"	Maria E. Perera	Catharina Ledeboer	November 25, 2015	121	1.22
A sneak peek of the season's new episodes using the first 30 minutes of "Storm and Grubb".
22–23	"Storm and Grubb"	Maria E. Perera	Catharina Ledeboer	November 30, 2015	122–123	0.95
Talia is still trapped in Lola's, but is soon rescued by a mysterious person, a boy named Jayden. Meanwhile, Dolores decides to go out and find Talia, leaving Frenchie in charge of Julie and Rocky. When the hurricane ends, Tyson, Rudy and Valerie head out to look for Talia as well, and Tyson and Valerie find her in a closet with Jayden. Afterwards, the gang searches for Dolores, whom Frenchie finds pinned under a trash can. Dolores is taken to the hospital, but recovers after a while. When Aunt Tilly returns to get Talia and Julie when the flights to Boston are cancelled, Valerie, Rudy and Tyson stall her again; however, Talia eventually convinces her to leave without her and Julie.
24	"Key Lime Memories"	Maria E. Perera	Catharina Ledeboer	December 1, 2015	124	1.01
Will gives Frenchie parfait spaghetti that makes Will go into Frenchie's memories and make a deal with him. Afterwards, Debbie and Tyson must now prevent Will from taking half of Fucinelli's. Talia searches for Will to retrieve the spices. Soon after Talia gets a new cooking area, Talia and Dolores open a box containing items belonging to Talia's father, including recipe books and a fork titled "Spice Master".
25	"Poached Grubb"	Maria E. Perera	Catharina Ledeboer	December 2, 2015	125	1.05
After Talia discovers that she is a Spice Master just like her father, she and Dolores search his recipe books for information about spices and being a Spice Master. Later, Talia and Tyson have a special moment, and they are about to kiss, but Dolores throws water on them again. While Debbie and Tyson continue to try to keep Will from becoming the owner of a half of Fuccinelli's, they and Talia get the spices back from him.
26	"Faux Frenchman"	Maria E. Perera	Catharina Ledeboer	December 3, 2015	126	0.90
Talia creates a dish for Will using the spices, which make Will happy enough to cancel the deal. Frenchie then tests the spices, as Rudy, along with Talia and Julie, shops for uniforms with Dolores. When Frenchie reveals to Debbie that he took Talia's beef during the Golden Ladle, Debbie gets mad at him. Later, Dolores gets an investor hired to help save Lola's.
27	"Just Desserts"	Maria E. Perera	Catharina Ledeboer	December 4, 2015	127	1.16
Valerie decides to have the group hold a bake sale to gain money to re-open Lola's. Talia helps Jayden at his food truck, while Julie wants to test if she is a Spice Master as well. While Talia's friends have the bake sale, in competition with Michael and Jayden's food truck, Dolores and Talia meet the investor. Meanwhile, Debbie is upset after what Frenchie told her in the previous episode.
28	"School of Bake"	Maria E. Perera	Catharina Ledeboer	December 7, 2015	128	0.84
Talia becomes angry at Tyson for not telling her Frenchie's secret. Soon after, she and her family and friends (minus Tyson) have a dinner to celebrate the day before the first day of school. However, Valerie leaves early because of a big secret she is hiding from. The next day, the kids start going to West Miami Beach School, and on that day, Tyson apologizes for what he did, and Talia forgives him. The next morning, Julie tests with Talia's spices.
29	"Chef Julie"	Maria E. Perera	Catharina Ledeboer	December 8, 2015	129	1.14
The spices don't work when Julie uses them, and soon, Rocky accidentally gets some of them knocked onto the floor. Meanwhile, Michael finds some documents as he is able to break into Lola's, and Dolores is about to get an investor for Lola's from Valerie's father without Talia knowing. Later, Talia helps Julie use the spices, but they don't work, upsetting Julie; however, she feels better when she, Talia and Dolores look through a photo album.
30	"Oil & Vinegar"	Maria E. Perera	Catharina Ledeboer	December 9, 2015	130	1.00
With help from Valerie's father, Dolores is able to hire a new investor, who finally gets Lola's redecorated, with re-opening ready to occur. Soon, Tyson gets Debbie to help Talia in Lola's, and Debbie gets her confidence in cooking back. Meanwhile, Julie and Rocky find a key that could lead to more magic spices.
31	"Food Meddle Jacket"	Maria E. Perera	Catharina Ledeboer	December 10, 2015	131	1.16
The investor changed Lola's a lot, making Talia unhappy, but she later feels better; Valerie then suggests a new catering system for Lola's. However, it is revealed that Jayden is a Spice Master as well when he uses magic spices of his own to cause a fight between Talia, Valerie and Rudy, until Dolores encourages Talia to still be the chef she wants to be. Later, Tyson asks Talia to the upcoming school dance, as Jayden uses his spices again.
32	"Food Fighters"	Maria E. Perera	Catharina Ledeboer	December 11, 2015	132	1.09
Jayden uses his spices once again to cause an argument between Tyson and Talia. Afterwards, Dolores suspects that someone has magic spices as well and are using them on Talia, who thinks that this someone must be Jayden and Michael. Jayden then asks Talia to the dance. Meanwhile, Talia tries to learn more about the key Julie and Rocky found, as Debbie forms a music group featuring Dolores, Frenchie, Tyson and Avery. Tyson later attempts to apologize to Talia, but it doesn't go so well.
33	"Yolo FroYo"	Maria E. Perera	Catharina Ledeboer	December 14, 2015	133	1.20
Talia finds out that Jayden is a SpiceMaster, and he pretends he isn't, but later admits he is. At the school dance, Debbie performs badly and gets booed, so Talia, Valerie and Rudy help her. Afterwards, they try to prevent the guests from eating empanadas Jayden put his spices in, but some eat them and make mischief. Talia and Debbie go to Jayden and Michael's food truck to make an antidote, which they feed to the guests. Talia and Tyson have more special moments when they dance together at the dance, then walk home together; however, for the third time, Dolores throws water on them when they are about to share another kiss. Later, Julie blames Talia's absence as the cause for the investor threatening to pull out of Lola's.
34	"Rice to the Occasion"	Maria E. Perera	Catharina Ledeboer	December 15, 2015	134	0.99
Tyson visits Jayden at the food truck, where they have a small dispute, and Tyson then warns Jayden and Michael to stay away from Talia. Later, Talia gathers Valerie and Rudy to make a plan to keep the investor out of control over Lola's, while Julie and Rocky plan to put equipment in Jayden and Michael's truck to overhear them. On a hillside, Tyson tells Debbie the truth about her talent, and she cooks at Lola's while banned from Fuccinelli's. At the end, after issues in the kitchen occur, the investor is revealed to be Chef Lorena Garcia.
35	"Brothers Grubb"	Maria E.Perera	Catharina Ledeboer	December 16, 2015	135	1.06
The gang explains the mess to Chef Lorena, who shuts down Lola's because of it. Talia tries to patch things up with Lorena by putting some spices in a dish, but things go wrong when the spices make Lorena act crazy. Afterwards, Tyson seeks Jayden's help to have Talia and Lorena get along. Meanwhile, Dolores finds a book regarding SpiceMasters, which Frenchie is able to translate. However, the two then learn from the book that Talia must battle Jayden in order to stay in Miami, while Julie, Valerie and Rudy see that Rocky's cousin Vinnie is stealing food from Lola's. Even worse, when Tyson reveals the truth about what Talia ate, another rift between them occurs.
36	"Fish Perfect"	Maria E.Perera	Catharina Ledeboer	December 17, 2015	136	0.82
Dolores delivers the news and challenging of the SpiceMaster fight to Jayden and Michael, while later, Talia, Valerie, Dolores, Julie and Rocky provide food to Vinnie and his family. Meanwhile, Debbie, Frenchie, Tyson and Rudy have a beach day in Fuccinelli's, which gets Tyson's mind off Jayden and Talia. Talia plans to do a donation program in Lola's, as Vinnie's mother then gets a job. While Jayden refuses to battle Talia, she realizes the reason for her gift and decides to battle him.
37	"Fly Food"	Maria E.Perera	Catharina Ledeboer & Charlotte Owen	December 18, 2015	137	1.20
Julie and Rocky help Talia get more spices in preparation for her fight against Jayden. Later, Talia makes Debbie the head sous chef of Lola's, as Frenchie messes with Jayden and Michael, and Tyson and Talia make up. With help from Dolores, Talia prepares for the spice battle.
38	"Cooking It Cool"	Maria E. Perera	Catharina Ledeboer	December 21, 2015	138	0.98
Julie and Rocky are able to overhear Jayden and Michael, and they learn from the brothers that there is a way to get more spices. Meanwhile, Debbie quits Fuccinelli's to focus on her new job at Lola's, and she will be in charge of the restaurant while Talia and her friends go on a trip to the Panhandle, where they will get more spices. Later, Talia breaks into the Grubb brothers' food truck to find the microphone Julie and Rocky placed, but she gets trapped inside with Jayden until Michael arrives and frees them. At the end, Tyson reveals his jealousy about not being part of what Talia shares with Jayden, but after he is reassured by her, he tells her that Frenchie is their ride to the Panhandle, and they hug, angering Jayden.
39	"Spice Island Pt.1" "Spice Island"	Maria E. Perera	Catharina Ledeboer & Charlotte Owen	December 22, 2015	139	1.19
Talia, Tyson, Rudy and Valerie plan the trip to the Panhandle, but Talia tells Rudy that he must stay at Lola's. However, they figures out that more spices are located in the Keys instead of the Panhandle. To get to the Keys, Dolores allows her car to be borrowed, and Talia, Tyson, Valerie and Frenchie must now get more spices before Jayden and Michael do. However, Michael is able is track down the group because of Frenchie.
40	"Spice Island Pt.2" "Escape to Spice Island"	Maria E. Perera	Catharina Ledeboer & Charlotte Owen	December 23, 2015	140	1.37
Talia and Tyson fall into a lake and attempt to get back up on the cliff they fell from; while doing it, they finally kiss without Dolores throwing water on them. After, Jayden falls in as well. Meanwhile, Valerie discovers that Frenchie kept the group busy. After being informed of the trouble, Dolores and Debbie head to the Keys. Talia, Tyson and Jayden are able to find ferns, but Talia falls into them, and Jayden gets injured saving her. Eventually, Dolores, Debbie, Valerie and Frenchie find them, more magic spices are harvested, and everybody is able to return to Miami safely. The season ends with the spice battle ready to begin.

== Broadcast ==
Talia in the Kitchen made its global debut on Nickelodeon in the United States on July 6, 2015, right after the premiere of the fourth and final season of Every Witch Way. In India, the series debuted on Disney Channel on March 4, 2018. In Canada, the series premiered on September 7, 2015 on YTV.
