= Mamá también =

Colombian telenovela

- Genre: Telenovela
- Directed by: Israel Sánchez; Camilo Quimbayo
- Starring: Ana María Estupiñán; Juanita Arias; Estefanía Piñeres; Variel Sánchez
- Country of origin: Colombia
- Original language: Spanish
- No. of seasons: 1
- No. of episodes: 85

Production
- Executive producer: Agustín Restrepo Isaza
- Camera setup: Multi-camera
- Production company: Teleset

Original release
- Network: RCN Televisión
- Release: 18 November 2013 – 28 April 2014

Mamá también is a Colombian telenovela produced by Teleset for RCN Televisión. The series was aired from 18 November 2013 to 28 April 2014. The plot revolves around teen pregnancy, bullying and drugs in young people, as well as their social life during their high school stage. It stars a youth cast made up of Ana María Estupiñán, Juanita Arias, Estefanía Piñeres, and Variel Sánchez.

It premiered with a total of 8.1 rating points, occupying fifth place as the least watched program during its premiere. It ended with a total of 3.6 rating points, being the least watched program in its last episode.

== Cast ==
=== Main ===
- Ana María Estupiñán as Mariana Cadavid
- Juanita Arias as Andrea Turbay
- Estefanía Piñeres as Leticia Amaya
- Variel Sánchez as Bryan Pinto
- Óscar Mauricio Rodríguez as Farid Galvis
- Lissbeth Cepeda as Magdalena Llinás
- Carlos Congote as Genaro Atuesta
- Carolina Cuervo as Carolina Medina
- John Alexander Mirque as Fabio Lema

=== Guest stars ===
- Didier van der Hove as Pablo Olarte
- Laura de León as Johana Vargas
- Sebastián Eslava as Martín Olarte
- Juan David Agudelo as Samuel Hoyos
- Nicole Santamaría as Tania
- Laura Junco as Adela Ramírez
- Harold Fonseca as Octavio Valencia
- Andrés Simón as Felipe
- Miguel González as Pascual Amaya
- Julio Sánchez Coccaro as Ángel Cadavid
