= Between Sea and Land =

2016 film

- Film poster
- Directed by: Manolo Cruz; Carlos del Castillo
- Written by: Manolo Cruz
- Starring: Vicky Hernández; Manolo Cruz; Viviana Serna; Jorge Cao
- Music by: David Murillo
- Distributed by: Babilla Films, Cineplex, Global Screen
- Release dates: 22 January 2016 (Sundance); 29 May 2025 (Colombia)
- Country: Colombia
- Language: Spanish

Between Sea and Land (Spanish: La ciénaga: Entre el mar y la tierra) is a 2016 Colombian drama film directed by Manolo Cruz and Carlos del Castillo. It was shown in the World Cinema Dramatic Competition section at the 2016 Sundance Film Festival and won the World Cinema Dramatic Special Jury Award for Acting (for Vicky Hernández and Manolo Cruz) and the World Cinema Audience Award: Dramatic. The film was commercially released on May 29, 2025 in Colombian theaters, due to copyright disputes between directors Carlos del Castillo and Manolo Cruz.

== Cast ==
- Jorge Cao
- Manolo Cruz
- Vicky Hernández
- Viviana Serna
- Mile Vergara
