= Eileen Moreno =

Colombian television actress (born 1984)

- Born: Eileen Moreno Estrada; 5 December 1984 (age 40); Palmira, Valle del Cauca
- Occupation: Actress
- Years active: 2006–present

Eileen Moreno Estrada (born 5 December 1984) is a Colombian television actress best known in her native country for her roles in Colombian telenovelas. Moreno was born in Palmira, Valle del Cauca, Colombia, and her most prominent television roles have been in La viuda negra as Griselda Blanco, in her youth stage, and Mariana Durán in the biographical drama series El Chivo, both series generally produced by RTI Producciones.

Moreno currently resides in Bogotá, Colombia and she is the founder and director of the Todas Unidas foundation. She has only participated in cinema in the film Operation E, a film based on the humanitarian operation called Operation Emmanuel, directed by former Venezuelan President Hugo Chávez, and former Colombian President Álvaro Uribe.

== Filmography ==
Film roles
Year	Title	Roles	Notes
2012	Operation E	Solangie	

Television roles
Year	Title	Roles	Notes
2006–2007	Padres e hijos	Rocío Pulido	
2008	El último matrimonio feliz	Young Camila	
2008	Oye bonita	Macarena Maestre	
2008	El Cartel		
2012	Pablo Escobar, The Drug Lord	Young Paty	Episode: "Las lecciones de Doña Enelia"
2013	Tres Caínes	Romualda Castaño	
2014	La viuda negra	Young Griselda Blanco	Main role (season 1); 12 episodes
2014	El Chivo	Mariana Durán	Main role; 70 episodes
2015	Diomedes, el cacique de la junta	Consuelo Martínez	
2018	La bella y las bestias	Susana	Recurring role; 17 episodes
2020	La Nocturna	Zayda Tacha	Main role (season 2)
