= Chica vampiro =

Colombian teen television series

- Genre: Telenovela
- Created by: Marcela Citterio
- Starring: Greeicy Rendón; Santiago Talledo; Eduardo Pérez; Lorena García
- Opening theme: "Chica Vampiro" by Greeicy Rendón
- Country of origin: Colombia
- Original language: Spanish
- No. of seasons: 1
- No. of episodes: 120

Production
- Executive producer: Nelly Ordoñez
- Producer: Stella Morales G
- Production location: Bogotá
- Running time: 42-45 minutes
- Production companies: Televideo; RCN Televisión

Original release
- Network: RCN
- Release: May 14 – November 5, 2013

Chica Vampiro (Vampire Girl) is a Colombian teen telenovela produced by RCN Televisión. It is an original story written by Argentinian Marcela Citterio, whose work has included Amor en Custodia, Patito Feo, and Aurora, among others. It follows the adventures of the young vampire Daisy O'Brian, played by Greeicy Rendón. Throughout Latin America, the series is broadcast by Nickelodeon Latin America. According to KidScreen Magazine, as of February 2014, Chica Vampiro was the most viewed program among children and teens between the ages of 4 and 17 in Colombia. In September 2019, RCN Televisión announced that Chica Vampiro would be available on Netflix.

== Premise ==
The series follows the life of Daisy O'Brian (Greeicy Rendón), an otherwise ordinary teenaged girl born into a family of vampires, who maintain a family tradition of offering the vampire curse to its members on their 16th birthday: Daisy, who had long made up her mind to remain mortal, is hit by a truck on that very day. When doctors inform her family that Daisy will die of her injuries, her parents Ana (Jacqueline Arenal) and Ulises (Juan Pablo Obregón) decide to bite her, turning her into a vampire and saving her life.

With vampirism thrust upon her against her will, Daisy is forced to hide her true nature from mortals and learn to live between two worlds: the mortal realm, where she attends school and attempts to pursue her dream of being a singer, and the Vampire World (Mundo Vampiro in the series), where she must attend vampire school, to learn how to deal with her new condition. Daisy must also deal with her feelings for her neighbor Max de la Torre (Santiago Talledo), for whom she intended to remain mortal, and with the feelings of vampire Mirco Vladimoff (Eduardo Pérez), who believes Daisy is his prophesied true love.

Throughout the series, the O'Brian family also faces conflict from other sources, such as mortals attempting to unmask them and feuds with other vampire families.

== Characters ==
- Greeicy Rendón as Daisy O'Brian
- Santiago Talledo as Max De La Torre.
- Eduardo Pérez as Mirco Vladimoff
- Lorena García as Marilyn Garcés.
- Estefany Escobar as Lucía Barragan
- Juan Pablo Obregón as Ulises O'Brian
- Jacqueline Arenal as Ana McLaren, Daisy & Vicente's mother
- Norma Nivia as Catalina Vladimoff
- Vanessa Blandón as Belinda De La Torre
- David Prada as Alejandro Corchuelo
- Erick Torres as Vicente O'Brian
- Aura María Cardenas as Julieta Vladimoff
- Chiara Francia as Esmeralda Vladimoff
- Susana Posada as Zaira Fangoria
- Linda Lucía Callejas as María McLaren
- Rafael Taibo as Drácula BlackMerMoon.
- Constanza Hernández as Noelia Pirrman
- Bibiana Navas as Lynette De La Torre
- Gustavo Ángel as Álvaro De La Torre
- Germán Escallón as Francisco Agudelo
- David Carrasco as Pericles Gonzáles
- Ilenia Antonini as Wendy BlackMerMoon
- Martha Silva as Leonor Gárces
- Sebastian Boscán as Octavio
- Juan Manuel Restrepo as Luis
- Alfredo Cuellar as Bruno Vladimoff "VampiMan"
- Guillermo Blanco as "Vampi Araña"
