= Mentira (Karoll Márquez and Martina la Peligrosa song) =

Single by Karoll Márquez and Martina la Peligrosa

from the album Dopamina
- Language: Spanish
- English title: "Lie"
- Released: 14 May 2020
- Length: 4:53
- Label: independent
- Songwriters: Karoll Márquez; Martina la Peligrosa; Carlos Montaño
- Producer: Carlos Montaño

Karoll Márquez singles chronology
"Las cartas sobre la mesa" (2018)	"Mentira" (2020)

Martina la peligrosa singles chronology
"Deja vu" (2019)	"Mentira" (2020)	"Tú no sabes amar" (2020)

Music video
- "Mentira" on YouTube

"Mentira" (English: "Lie") is the first single from Karoll Márquez's upcoming EP, Dopamina. The song is a pop ballad and it was written by Márquez, Martina La Peligrosa, and Carlos Montaño (a member of the Colombian duo Siam). Márquez said "Mentira" was inspired as a tribute to the sentiments artists have to endure during dance auditions.

== Music video ==
The plot of the video is an homage to the dancing world, as it occurs in the midst of a dancing audition. The video was shot in Bogotá and directed by Daniel Jiménez.

The lyrics depict the anxiety felt by performance artists during an audition, as they are facing a potential rejection from a role.
