= The Girl (TV series) =

Colombian television series

- Genre: Drama
- Created by: Juana Uribe
- Written by: Yamile Daza; Diego Osorio; Ricardo Aponte; Leonardo Sardi
- Directed by: Camilo Vega; Rodrigo Triana
- Creative director: Gonzalo Martínez
- Starring: See list
- Theme music composer: Begner Vásquez Angulo
- Opening theme: "Te invito" performed by Herencia de Timbiquí
- Country of origin: Colombia
- Original language: Spanish
- No. of episodes: 86

Production
- Executive producer: Ana Piñeres
- Producer: Clara María Ochoa
- Production locations: Bogotá; Meta; Cundinamarca; Acacías; San Francisco, Antioquia
- Camera setup: Multi-camera
- Production company: CMO Producciones

Original release
- Network: Caracol Televisión
- Release: April 26 – September 16, 2016

The Girl (Spanish: La niña) is a Colombian drama television series produced by CMO Producciones for Caracol Televisión. It is based on a true story that addresses the issue of minors in armed conflict and reintegration. The series was available on Netflix as an original series from 18 November 2016 to 19 November 2022, after acquiring the license rights.

== Plot ==
The Girl, based on real-life facts, tells the story of a girl who has been forcibly recruited by the guerrillas. She experiences the horror of war first hand, and after many years manages to leave the armed group to embark on a path to return to society. In the process of reintegration into society, she must face herself and her own family.

== Cast ==
- Ana María Estupiñán as Belky / Sara
- Sebastián Eslava as Manuel Monsalve
- Marcela Benjumea as Mireya Pinzón
- Marcelo Dos Santos as Decano Alfonso Montealegre
- Diego Vásquez as Coronel Luis Barragán
- Cristina Campuzano as Constanza Duque / Connie
- Juan Manuel Mendoza as Doctor Rodrigo Carrera
- Cony Camelo as Tatiana Toquica
- Santiago Alarcón as Doctor Horacio Fuentes
- Variel Sánchez as Victor Manjarrés
- Juan Sebastián Aragón as Coronel Javier Alzate
- Laura Perico as Juliana Montealegre
- Alberto Cardeño as Miguel Eslava
- Laura Archbold as Natalia Villamizar
- Carlos Felipe Sánchez as Santiago Caballero
- Martha Restrepo as Ángela Acosta de Barragán
- Fernando Arévalo as Padre Rivas
- Brenda Hanst as Doctora Silvia Lozano
- Fabio Velasco as Rigoberto Barón
- Roger Moreno as Esteban
- Juan Millán as Julio
- María Barreto as Yolima
- Victoria Ortíz as María Luisa Barragán
- Melissa Cáceres as Beatriz Eslava Pinzón

=== Guest stars ===
- Mike Bahía as Himself
- Yolanda Rayo as Herself
- Begner Vasquez as Himself

== Episodes ==
No.	Title	Original release date	Colombia viewers (millions)
1	"Sara es capturada por las autoridades e ingresa al programa de reintegración"	26 April 2016	13.7
2	"La vida de Sara corre peligro tras la noticia de la muerte de Roncancio"	27 April 2016	10.6
3	"Para Belky y su familia no es fácil empezar de cero en una nueva ciudad"	28 April 2016	10.1
4	"El sueño de Belky de ser médica se ve truncado por el decano"	29 April 2016	9.6
5	"Lo logró, Belky consigue el dinero para matricularse en medicina"	2 May 2016	11.0
6	"Belky siente que no va a ser capaz de sobrevivir al mundo universitario"	3 May 2016	10.6
7	"Belky se siente acorralada con las preguntas que le hacen sobre su pasado"	4 May 2016	11.2
8	"Barragán encuentra a Belky y no descansará hasta tenerla de frente"	5 May 2016	11.3
9	"Belky queda fría al recibir una llamada de Barragán en el Call Center"	6 May 2016	10.2
10	"Barragán enfurece al enterarse que Belky se apareció en su casa"	10 May 2016	11.5
11	"Tatiana retira su apoyo a Belky y la saca del programa de reintegración"	11 May 2016	11.2
12	"El coronel Alzate ayudará a Belky a desenmascarar a Barragán"	12 May 2016	10.6
13	"Barragán pone en marcha su plan para acorralar a Belky"	13 May 2016	10.5
14	"Belky es un ejemplo para sus compañeros por sus buenas calificaciones"	16 May 2016	10.9
15	"Lejos de Manuel, Belky se divierte con Santiago y él gana su apuesta"	17 May 2016	11.1
16	"Manuel logra su cometido aliándose con Raúl para ayudar a Belky"	18 May 2016	10.9
17	"Belky enfrenta a Raúl con la esperanza de que se haga justicia"	19 May 2016	9.4
18	"Por defender a su mamá, Belky se mete en un gran problema en la universidad"	20 May 2016	9.8
19	"Belky decide contarle la verdad sobre su pasado al profesor Horacio"	23 May 2016	10.7
20	"No se va, Belky conserva su cupo y el sueño de ser médica sigue en pie"	24 May 2016	11.3
21	"Arrepentido, Santiago hace lo que sea por recuperar a Belky, ¿funcionará?"	25 May 2016	10.6
22	"Belky se derrumba al enterarse de que Raúl se escapó sin testificar"	26 May 2016	10.1
23	"Lo vendió, Manuel termina en la cárcel por culpa de su padrino"	27 May 2016	9.8
24	"Manuel queda en libertad pero le pone fin a lo que siente por Belky"	31 May 2016	9.6
25	"Belky sospecha que Natalia compró el examen de anatomía"	1 June 2016	10.8
26	"El testimonio de Raúl lo lleva a un destino incierto que involucra a Manuel"	2 June 2016	10.2
27	"La mejor noticia, Belky se gana la beca y lo celebra por lo alto"	15 June 2016	10.4
28	"Manuel tendrá que pagar por un crimen que no cometió"	17 June 2016	12.4
29	"Manuel se hunde en la desesperación al estar de nuevo tras las rejas"	20 June 2016	9.4
30	"Belky logra conseguir un abogado que tome el caso de Manuel"	23 June 2016	9.5
31	"La ambición lleva a Julio a dar un paso en falso que pone en riesgo su vida"	24 June 2016	10.0
32	"Misión exitosa, gracias a Belky, el Ejército rescata a Yolima y Tatiana"	27 June 2016	10.3
33	"Belky se convierte en la nueva asistente del doctor Montealegre"	28 June 2016	10.9
34	"Barragán es destituido del Ejército e inician los problemas familiares"	29 June 2016	10.1
35	"Belky toma fuerzas y le cuenta la verdad sobre su pasado al decano"	30 June 2016	10.8
36	"Montealegre le da una nueva oportunidad a Belky"	1 July 2016	9.8
37	"Los celos se apoderan de Belky por culpa de Yolima"	5 July 2016	11.6
38	"Barón queda acorralado y busca desaparecer las pistas"	6 July 2016	9.8
39	"Belky no quiere perder a Manuel y decide abrirle de nuevo su corazón"	7 July 2016	11.9
40	"Una amistad del pasado regresa a la vida de Belky y la desequilibra"	8 July 2016	10.1
41	"Por culpa de Maria Luisa, Belky es amenazada por Barragán"	11 July 2016	11.1
42	"Solo encontrar el cuerpo de Raúl le dará una luz de libertad a Manuel"	12 July 2016	11.4
43	"¿Qué tramará?, Barragán llega hasta la universidad en busca de Horacio"	13 July 2016	9.2
44	"Barragán atenta contra la vida de su esposa y deja herido a Horacio"	14 July 2016	10.7
45	"Juliana se entera del pasado de Belky y le da un vuelco a su amistad"	15 July 2016	10.6
46	"Santiago inicia una investigación sobre Belky para desprestigiarla"	18 July 2016	10.8
47	"Justicia, Manuel recupera su libertad y anhela encontrarse con Belky"	19 July 2016	10.8
48	"Manuel disfruta de su primera noche en libertad junto a Belky"	21 July 2016	11.6
49	"Belky y Montealegre temen por su permanencia en la universidad"	22 July 2016	11.5
50	"El desgarrador testimonio de un soldado podría favorecer al decano"	25 July 2016	12.3
51	"La bienvenida de la nueva decana genera discordia entre Connie y Rodrigo"	26 July 2016	12.6
52	"Como un sueño, Belky y Manuel pasan su primera noche de pasión"	27 July 2016	8.5
53	"De nuevo un obstáculo se interpone entre los planes de Manuel y Belky"	28 July 2016	11.2
54	"Yolima le deja el camino libre a Manuel para que haga su vida con Belky"	29 July 2016	10.9
55	"Belky se gana la admiración de Rodrigo como asistente de Alfonso"	1 August 2016	12.0
56	"Montealegre queda devastado al encontrar el cuerpo de Gilma"	2 August 2016	12.6
57	"Barragán logra burlar la ley y queda en libertad"	3 August 2016	13.0
58	"Con la salida de Barragán, todos temen por su vida"	4 August 2016	12.0
59	"Silvia y Connie corren peligro a causa de un grave accidente"	8 August 2016	12.3
60	"Barragán llega hasta la casa de Belky buscando venganza"	9 August 2016	10.6
61	"Belky llega hasta donde Malú para advertirle su suerte"	10 August 2016	10.9
62	"Frente a frente, Barragán intenta vengarse de Belky"	11 August 2016	11.5
63	"Barragán es víctima del karma por burlarse de Pablo"	12 August 2016	10.8
64	"Barragán se queda solo, sin dinero y en la cárcel"	16 August 2016	12.2
65	"Mireya teme por la relación de Belky y Manuel"	17 August 2016	10.2
66	"La fiesta de bautizo queda opacada por culpa de don Chucho"	18 August 2016	11.1
67	"El corazón valiente de Víctor se rompe por una trágica noticia"	19 August 2016	12.0
68	"¿El fin?, Manuel termina su relación con Belky"	22 August 2016	11.3
69	"La vida de Belky corre peligro por su pasado"	23 August 2016	11.3
70	"Herminio encuentra la manera de atacar a Belky"	24 August 2016	11.1
71	"El plan para mantener a Peter con vida entra en acción"	25 August 2016	11.4
72	"No hay vuelta atrás, Manuel saca a Belky definitivamente de su vida"	26 August 2016	N/A
73	"Melissa confiesa su amor a Manuel en una cita romántica"	29 August 2016	11.4
74	"La salud de Belky empeora y Manuel va a su rescate"	30 August 2016	13.3
75	"Un matrimonio vuelve a unir a Manuel y Belky"	31 August 2016	12.4
76	"Belky empeora y podría estar al borde de la muerte"	1 September 2016	13.2
77	"Herminio queda acorralado y pretende huir"	2 September 2016	N/A
78	"El instinto de madre de Mireya destapa toda la verdad"	5 September 2016	13.7
79	"Herminio escapa y deja malherido a Manuel en el proceso"	7 September 2016	12.9
80	"Montealegre renuncia a la rectoría para ser asumida por Bárbara"	8 September 2016	13.4
81	"Herminio es capturado por la policía en una operación de película"	9 September 2016	13.0
82	"¿La encontrará?, Segura está cada vez más cerca de Belky y de su familia"	12 September 2016	13.6
83	"Segura confiesa las verdaderas razones para perseguir a Belky"	13 September 2016	13.2
84	"Segura es acorralada y capturada en la universidad"	14 September 2016	12.8
85	"Manuel tiene un emotivo reencuentro con su madre"	15 September 2016	12.2
86	"Belky se convierte en la inspiración de miles de niños reclutados"	16 September 2016	13.7

== Awards and nominations ==
=== India Catalina Awards ===
Year	Category	Appointment	Result
2017	Best Telenovela or Serial		Won
2017	Best leading actress of soap opera or series	Ana María Estupiñán	Won
2017	Best actor of soap opera or series	Sebastian Eslava	Won
2017	Best Supporting Actress soap opera or series	Marcela Benjumea	Won
2017	Best Supporting Actor soap opera or series	Variel Sánchez	Won
2017	Best Villain Telenovela or Serial	Diego Vásquez	Won
2017	Best Actress and Newcomer of the Year	Victoria Ortiz	Won
2017	Best Children's Talent	Melissa Caceres	Won
2017	Best Director	Rodrigo Triana and Camilo Vega	Won
2017	Best Book	Juana Uribe, María Clara Torres, Ricardo Aponte, Leonor Sardi, Yamile Daza and Diego Osorio	Won
2017	Best Editing soap opera or series	Diego Narciso	Won

=== Platino Awards ===
Year	Category	Result
2017	Best Ibero-American TV series	Nominated
