= Ana María Estupiñán =

Colombian actress and singer

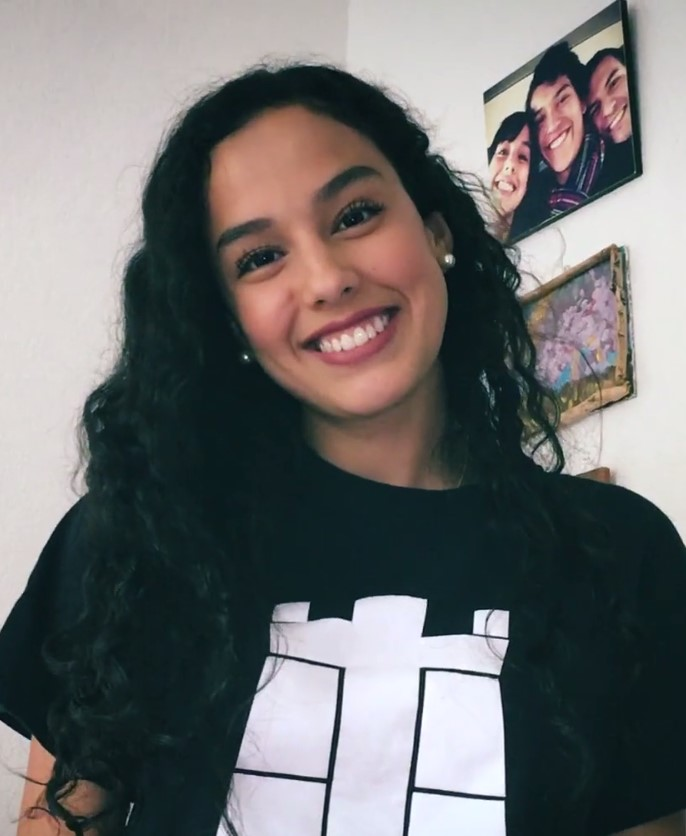
- Born: Ana María Estupiñán García; 7 April 1992 (age 34); Bogotá, Colombia
- Occupations: Actress; singer
- Years active: 2008–present

Ana María Estupiñán García (born 7 April 1992, in Bogotá, Colombia) is a Colombian actress and singer.

== Biography ==
Ana María Estupiñán is the daughter of Juan Carlos Estupiñán and Liliana García. Since childhood she has participated in the entertainment trade with her siblings Laura and Felipe Estupiñán. At the age of 12, she began her theater career by entering the academy of Caracol. Ana Maria is married. She was involved in her church youth group from an early age.

== Filmography ==
Television performances
Year	Title	Roles	Notes
2008–2010	Oye bonita	Chiquinquirá Maestre	
2010	La Pola	Young Pola Salavarrieta	Main role; 85 episodes
2010	Amor sincero	Omaira Giraldo	
2013	Allá te espero	Juana "Juanita" Salazar Restrepo	
2013–2014	Mamá también	Mariana Cadavid	Main role; 105 episodes
2014	La ronca de oro	Young Sofía Helena Vargas Marulanda "Helenita"	Main role; 26 episodes
2015	Toni, la Chef	Antonia "Toni" Parra Velazquez	Main role; 39 episodes
2016	The Girl	Belky Bustamante "Sara"	Main role; 86 episodes
2018	Al otro lado del muro	Karina Sullivan	Main role; 56 episodes
2019	Decisiones: Unos ganan, otros pierden	Bibi Molina	Episode: "Amor de madre"
2020	Amar y vivir	Irene	Main role; 69 episodes

== Awards and nominations ==
=== Premios India Catalina ===
Year	Category	Nominated works	Result
2011	Newcomer of the Year	La Pola	Nominated

=== Premios TVyNovelas ===
Year	Category	Nominated works	Result
2011	Newcomer of the Year	La Pola	Won
2014	Best leading actress of series	Mamá también	Nominated
2014	Best Supporting Actress	Allá te espero	Won

=== Kids Choice Awards Colombia ===
Year	Category	Nominated works	Result
2014	Favorite TV Actress	La ronca de oro	Nominated
2015	Favorite TV Actress	Toni, la Chef	Won

=== Kids Choice Awards México ===
Year	Category	Nominated works	Result
2015	Favorite TV Actress	Toni, la Chef	Nominated
