= Bloque de búsqueda (TV series) =

Colombian telenovela

- Genre: Telenovela
- Created by: Jorg Hiller
- Directed by: Israel Sánchez; Rodrigo Lalinde
- Starring: Rafael Novoa; Sebastián Martínez; Carolina Gómez; Verónica Orozco
- Country of origin: Colombia
- Original language: Spanish

Production
- Executive producer: Luis Eduardo Jiménez
- Production locations: Bogotá; Medellín; Cali
- Production company: Sony Pictures Television

Original release
- Network: RCN Televisión
- Release: April 26, 2016

Bloque de búsqueda (English: Search Bloc), is a Colombian telenovela produced by Sony Pictures Television for RCN Televisión. The telenovela is based on the life of Hernán Martín and Antonio Gavilán, who created the group Bloque de búsqueda to capture of Pablo Escobar.

== Plot ==
"Bloque de búsqueda" tells the untold story of Coronel Hernán Martín and Capitán Antonio Gavilán, the men who created and commanded the elite police corps, responsible for tracking and killing Pablo Escobar. Not having all the resources needed Gavilán and Martín resort to all sorts of strategies at the edge of legality. At time allying with enemies and putting their lives and their families at risk in order to bring the most ruthless and elusive criminal in Colombia to justice.

== Cast ==
- Rafael Novoa as Hernán Martín
- Sebastián Martínez as Capitán Gavilán
- Carolina Gómez as Milena de Martín
- Verónica Orozco as Ana María de Gavilán
- Bryan Moreno as Hernán Martín Jr
- Laura Londoño as Olga Diez
