= TVyNovelas Awards Colombia =

TVyNovelas Awards
- Country: Colombia
- Presented by: RCN Televisión
- First award: March 1991
- Final award: September 15, 2018
- Website: http://www.tvynovelas.com/premios-co/

Television/radio coverage
- Network: RCN Televisión (1999-2017); E! (2018)

The TVyNovelas Awards was a Colombian award given annually to national and international actors and productions. The ceremony is broadcast annually by the television channel RCN Televisión, the prize goes in general to telenovelas and Colombian series, also Caracol Televisión productions and other TV channels are nominated. The first awards ceremony was in 1992. The awards are a Colombian version of TVyNovelas Awards Mexico.

The awards were discontinued as of 2019 due to the closure of Editorial Televisa in Colombia, and the end of the TVyNovelas magazine.

== Awards ceremonies ==
- 26th TVyNovelas Awards Colombia (2017)

== Ratings ==
Ceremony
Ceremony	Date	Viewers
21st	14 April 2012	7.6
22nd	13 April 2013	5.5
23rd	29 March 2014	5.2
26th	16 September 2017	2.7
