= Venganza (TV series) =

- Genre: Telenovela
- Created by: Tania Cárdenas; Conchita Ruiz
- Based on: Revenge by Mike Kelley
- Directed by: Juan Felipe Cano
- Creative director: Germán Lozada
- Starring: See list
- Music by: Danny Rubio
- Country of origin: Colombia
- Original language: Spanish
- No. of episodes: 124

Production
- Executive producers: Fernando Barbosa; Leonardo Aranguibel
- Camera setup: Multi-camera

Original release
- Network: RCN Televisión
- Release: March 6 – September 11, 2017

Venganza is a Colombian telenovela based on the television series of Mike Kelley titled Revenge. Produced by Vista Productions Colombia, through Disney Media Networks Latin America, for RCN Televisión. The series premiered on March 6, 2017.

== Plot ==
A terrorist attack puts Ramón Piedrahíta and his firm in charge of washing the cartel's money. Faced with this situation, he is forced to choose a scapegoat among his employees and discovers that his wife, Victoria is unfaithful to David Santana, executive in his firm. Ramón, to get revenge he buys the silence of many of his relatives and David is betrayed by the people he trusted the most, including his beloved Victoria. David is unjustly sentenced to 45 years in prison and is murdered in jail.

Thus begins the story of Amanda Santana, the daughter of David Santana, a man who was betrayed by Ramón and Victoria Piedrahita, and blamed for having been responsible for a terrorist attack on a commercial airliner. This fact destroyed Amanda's life; was separated from her father and forced to believe that she was the daughter of a murderer. When Amanda turned 18, she discovered the truth about what happened; the revelations in David Santana's diaries are the trigger of hatred and anger that move Amanda to want to destroy the lives of every person who betrayed her father. To do this, she builds her new identity, and now with the identity of "Emilia Rivera", will make all those involved in the betrayal of her father pay the consequences of their actions.

== Cast ==
- Margarita Muñoz as Amanda Santana / Emilia Rivera
- María Elena Döehring as Victoria Piedrahíta
- Andrés Toro as Adrián Lozano
- Guillermo Blanco as Sergio Lozano
- Jason Day as Daniel Piedrahíta
- Jacques Touckmanian as Martín Lanz
- Javier Gómez as Ramón Piedrahíta
- Greeicy Rendón as Gabriela Piedrahíta
- Sebastián Eslava as Enrique "Kike" Castaño
- Emmanuel Esparza as Cesar Riaño
- Silvia de Dios as Cristina Ochoa
- Luis Fernando Bohórquez as Vicente Salinas
- Didier van der Hove as Sebastián Arboleda
- Franártur Duque as Gael (Young executive)

== Ratings ==
Season	Timeslot (ET)	Episodes	First aired		Last aired	
Season	Timeslot (ET)	Episodes	Date	Viewers (millions)	Date	Viewers (millions)
1	Mon–Fri 10:00pm	124	March 6, 2017	5.8	September 11, 2017	6.7
