= Kaleth Morales =

- Morales in 2004

Background information
- Also known as: El Rey de la Nueva Ola
- Born: Kaleth Miguel Morales Troya; June 9, 1983; Valledupar, Cesar, Colombia
- Died: August 24, 2005 (aged 22) Nueva Granada, Magdalena, Colombia
- Genres: Vallenato
- Occupations: Musician; singer; songwriter
- Instruments: Guitar; vocals
- Years active: 2003–2005
- Labels: Sony BMG Music Entertainment
- Website: ElVallenato.com Entry

Kaleth Miguel Morales Troya (9 June 1983 – 24 August 2005) was a Colombian vallenato singer and songwriter, best known as the leader of the "Nueva Ola" ("New Wave") movement in Vallenato, having released singles such as Vivo en el Limbo.

== Life and career ==
Morales was born in Valledupar, Cesar, Colombia to singers Miguel Morales and Nevis Troya. He was one of three brothers and two sisters. When Morales was thirteen years old, he made his first musical composition, a song called Solo he Quedado ("Alone I'm Left"). Although it was never recorded, it was the song that drove him into music, and soon afterwards his father gave him a guitar to aid his creativity.

During his teenage years, Kaleth wrote a number of successful singles that were covered by different groups. His song "Novios Cruzados" ("Crossed Lovers") was covered by Los Diablitos, "No Aguanta" ("It Doesn't Hold"), "No Seré Tu Payaso" ("I Won't Be Your Clown") by Los Gigantes, and "Mi Reina Consentida" ("My Spoiled Queen") by his father, among others.

In 2003 he released his first single, "Voy a Atraparte" ("I'm Gonna Catch You") with the accordionist Manuel Julián. The single proved to be an instant hit because of its fresh, playful take on traditional vallenato music. His most famous song, "Vivo En El Limbo" ("I Live the Limbo"), started as a simple tune he performed at parties, but quickly became popular when it received an official release in 2004, the same year he prepared his first album for Sony BMG Music Entertainment. The album, "La Hora de la Verdad" ("The Hour of Truth"), was released in 2005. The album's singles, "Vivo En El Limbo" and "La Hora de la Verdad", were sold around Ecuador and Venezuela, where they are still popular today.

According to Morales, he was inspired by, "Everyday stories, my friend's lives, my own experience and even my mother... from my father I have learnt that you have to value the backup from the media and be thankful to the people that backs me [sic] up. My style is based in [sic] romantic lyrics, but with fast and modern arrangements, it is what I call my own journey."

On 7 September 2004, Morales and accordionist Juank Ricardo premiered their video of "Vivo en el Limbo", and did a national tour of Colombia, ending in El Campín, Bogotá's soccer stadium, where Morales appeared with other vallenato artists in the "Nuestra Tierra" ("Our Land") concert. After the tour ended, Kaleth did an internship in his hometown Valledupar to finish his studies.

== Death ==
On 24 August 2005, Kaleth Morales and his brother, Keiner, were driving from Cartagena to Valledupar; between Plato and Nueva Granada, Magdalena they lost control of the truck due to the heavy rain. Kaleth suffered serious trauma whilst his brother suffered less serious injuries. They were sent to Bocagrande Hospital in Cartagena. Doctors confirmed Morales' death on the morning of 24 August due to a marked brain edema, with a deep parietal contusion. According to the medical staff, Kaleth entered the hospital showing little signs of stabilisation, already in an unresponsive coma, and extreme hypothermia. The next day, more than 10,000 people walked beside his body to Valledupar, where he was buried in the Ecce Homo Gardens, among his family, friends, and fans.

== Legacy ==
Morales's legacy includes the best-selling album, "Único" ("Unique"), with his friend Juan Ricardo, released in November 2005, shortly after his death. Único's tracks were mostly composed and written by Kaleth. His first two albums are still popular in Ecuador. "Vivo en el Limbo", similarly, has been subject to a number of covers and remixes by various groups such as Latin Dreams, months before his death, and Salserín, in an homage. Sony BMG released a compilation album on June 26, 2006, Kaleth Morales en Guitarra ("Kaleth Morales on Guitar"), with previously unreleased tracks, such as "Lo Mejor Para Los Dos (Todo de Cabeza)" ("The Best For Us Both (Everything Upside down)"), which became a hit.

== Discography ==
=== La Hora de la Verdad (February 2004) ===
- Mis Cinco Sentidos (My Five Senses)
- Mi Hoja de Vida (My Resumé)
- Culpable de Tu Amor (Guilty of Your Love)
- Se Va a Formar (It's About to Go Down)
- La Reina de mis Sueños (The Queen of my Dreams)
- La Mano en el Hombro (The Hand in the Shoulder)
- Aparentemente (Apparently)
- La Hora de la Verdad (The Hour of Truth)
- La Pelusa (The Fuzz)
- Te Llamo y Te Busco (I Call You and I Seek You)
- Porque Dios lo Quiere (Because God Wants it)
- Tú No Comprendes (You Don't Understand)
- Vivo en el Limbo (I Live in the Limbo)

=== Único (November 2005) ===
- Siete Palabras (Seven Words)
- Anónimo (Anonymous)
- De Millón a Cero (From Million to Zero)
- Ella es Mi Todo (She's My Everything)
- La Película (The Movie)
- Todo El Mundo (The Whole World)
- La Purita Verdad (The Pure Truth)
- Dame Un Beso (Give Me a Kiss)
- Qué Mal Hicimos (What Wrong Did we Do)
- Sombra de Mi Alma (Shadow of My Soul)
- Mary

=== Kaleth Morales en Guitarra (June 2006) ===
- Lo Mejor Para Los Dos (Todo de Cabeza) (The Best For Us Both (Everything Upside down))
- Mis Cinco Sentidos (My five senses)
- Anónimo (Anonymous)
- Bastante Complicado (Pretty Complicated)
- Ella es Mi Todo (She is my everything)
- La Hora de la Verdad (the hour of truth)
- Qué Mal Hicimos (what wrong did we do)
- Vivo en el Limbo (living in limbo)
- Siete Palabras (seven words)
- Sombra de Mi Alma (shadow of my soul)
- La Película (the movie)
- De Millón a Cero (from a million to zero)
- La Purita Verdad (purely truth)
- Aparentemente (apparently)
- Culpable de Tu Amor (guilty of your love)
- La Pelusa (the fuzz)
- Lo Mejor Para Los Dos (Todo de Cabeza) (Accordion Live Version)

== Quotes ==
- “Music is a way of communication that humans have, and thus it helps us transform and transmit feelings; in few words, it's everything.”

== See also ==
- Vallenato
