= 1st Macondo Awards =

- Date: October 21, 2010
- Site: Jorge Eliécer Gaitán Theatre; Bogotá, Colombia

Highlights
- Best Film: Portraits in a Sea of Lies
- Most awards: Portraits in a Sea of Lies and The Wind Journeys (3)
- Most nominations: The Wind Journeys (8)

Television coverage
- Network: Señal Colombia

The 1st Macondo Awards ceremony, presented by the Colombian Academy of Cinematography Arts and Sciences, honored the best audiovisual productions of 2010. It took place on October 21, 2010, at the Jorge Eliécer Gaitán Theatre in Bogotá. The ceremony awarded 12 categories and was broadcast by Señal Colombia.

The film The Wind Journeys won the award for Best Film.

== Winners and nominees ==
| Best Picture: Portraits in a Sea of Lies; The Wind Journeys; Crab Trap | Best Director: Ciro Guerra – The Wind Journeys; Óscar Ruiz Navia – Crab Trap; Jorge Navas – Blood and Rain |
| Best Actor: Andrés Parra – Gabriel's Passion; Julián Román – Portraits in a Sea of Lies; Marciano Martínez – The Wind Journeys | Best Actress: Paola Baldión – Portraits in a Sea of Lies; Gloria Montoya – Blood and Rain; Adriana Arango – I Love You, Ana Elisa |
| Best Supporting Actor: Manolo Cardona – Undertow; Diego Vásquez – Gabriel's Passion; Julián Arango – I Love You, Ana Elisa; Cesar Badillo – I Love You, Ana Elisa | Best Supporting Actress: Margarita Rosa de Francisco – Of Love and Other Demons; Isabel Gaona – Gabriel's Passion; Marcela Valencia – I Love You, Ana Elisa |
| Best Screenplay: Carlos Gaviria – Portraits in a Sea of Lies; Jorge Navas, Carlos Henao, Corinne-Alize Le Maoult – Blood and Rain; Ciro Guerra – The Wind Journeys; Cesar Badillo – I Love You, Ana Elisa | Best Cinematography: Paulo Andrés Pérez – The Wind Journeys; Mauricio Vidal – Undertow; Juan Carlos Gil – Blood and Rain |
| Best Editing: Sebastián Hernández – Blood and Rain; Felipe Guerrero – Crab Trap; Iván Wild – The Wind Journeys | Best Art Direction: Juan Carlos Acevedo – Of Love and Other Demons; Diana Trujillo – Undertow; Angélica Perea – The Wind Journeys |
| Best Sound Design: Miguel Vargas, Isabel Cristina Torres, Fréderic Ther – Crab Trap; Carlos Lopera – Gabriel's Passion; Guillermo Damián Picco, Daniel Garcés – Blood and Rain | Best Score: Iván Campos – The Wind Journeys; Selma Mutal – Undertow; Alejandro Ramírez Rojas – The Actors of the Conflict |
| National Feature Film Award: Carlos Gaviria – Portraits in a Sea of Lies; Spiros Stathoulopoulos – PVC-1; Javier Fuentes-León – Undertow; Óscar Ruíz Navia – Crab Trap; Ciro Guerra – The Wind Journeys; Nicolas Entel – Sins of my Father | Lifetime Award: Luis Ospina; Hernando González; Julio Luzardo; Justo Posada; Roberto Triana; Sergio Cabrera |
People's Choice Award: Gabriel's Passion

== See also ==
- List of Colombian films
- Macondo Awards
- 2010 in film
