= Escupiré sobre sus tumbas =

- Genre: Telenovela
- Based on: I Spit on Your Graves by Boris Vian
- Developed by: Juana Uribe; Ana María Parra; Héctor Chiquillo
- Written by: Ana María Parra; Héctor Chiquillo; Juliana Barrera
- Directed by: Mónica Botero; Carlos Mario Urrea
- Starring: Essined Aponte; Cristian Gamero; María Elisa Camargo
- Theme music composer: Nicolás Uribe; Sebastián Luengas
- Opening theme: "Cuando Estoy Junto a Ti" by María Elisa Camargo
- Composer: Helman Moreno
- Country of origin: Colombia
- Original language: Spanish
- No. of seasons: 1
- No. of episodes: 60

Production
- Executive producers: Dago García; María Paula Bustamante; Ángela Vergara
- Producer: Asier Aguilar
- Editor: Andrea Paola Díaz
- Production company: Caracol Televisión

Original release
- Network: Caracol Televisión
- Release: 28 October 2024 – 7 February 2025

Escupiré sobre sus tumbas (English title: Until You Burn) is a Colombian telenovela based on the 1946 French novel I Spit on Your Graves written by Boris Vian. It aired on Caracol Televisión from 28 October 2024 to 7 February 2025. The series stars Essined Aponte, Cristian Gamero and María Elisa Camargo.

== Plot ==
The telenovela follows Brian O'Connor, who wants to avenge the death of his brother Sonny, found dead by apparent suicide on the Caribbean Coast. Brian goes in the guise of renowned ship captain Vinicio Gallo to uncover the truth and face the Obregón Martelli family, one of the most powerful and prestigious families on the Caribbean Coast, whose members are suspects in his brother's death.

== Cast ==
=== Main ===
- Essined Aponte as Victoria Iguarán
- Cristian Gamero as Brian O'Connor / Vinicio Gallo
- María Elisa Camargo as Katherine Obregón
- Rita Bendek as Gina Martelli
- Cristina García as Nicole Obregón
- Melanie Dell'Olmo as Melissa Slevi
- Carolina Serrano as Danna Mendosa
- Isa Mosquera as Marisol Lizcano
- Carlos Aguilar as Javier Fernández
- Ramses Ramos
- Simón Savi
- Manolo Alzamora as Dylan
- Jaisson Jeack
- Key de la Hoz
- Mario Camacho as Sonny O'Connor

=== Recurring and guest stars ===
- Leonardo Acosta as Raymundo Obregón
- Juan Fernando Sánchez as Federico Pumarejo
- José Narváez as Antonio Miranda
- Sonia Cuesta
- Rodolfo Silva
- Carlos Esteban Martínez Quintana
- Santiago Suárez
- Jhon Narváez
- Larry Quiñones
- Rostyslav Kalatsynskyi
- Ángela Duarte
- Valeria Emiliani
- Paola Acevedo

== Production ==
Filming began on 21 April 2024 and concluded in July 2024.

== Episodes ==
No.	Title	Original air date	Colombia viewers (Rating points)
1	"Brian se propone vengar la muerte de su hermano"	28 October 2024	7.2
2	"Brian pone en marcha su plan y se acerca a Katherine"	29 October 2024	7.1
3	"Katherine acepta compartir tiempo con Brian"	30 October 2024	6.4
4	"Vinicio se entera de más detalles de la muerte de su hermano"	31 October 2024	6.5
5	"Katherine habla con Raymundo sobre la muerte de Sonny"	1 November 2024	6.4
6	"Brian descubre que la familia Obregón lo está investigando"	5 November 2024	5.7
7	"Aparece un enemigo anónimo en la vida de Brian"	6 November 2024	5.3
8	"Katherine sospecha que Brian anda en negocios ilegales"	7 November 2024	5.1
9	"Javi indaga acerca de la nueva vida de Brian"	8 November 2024	5.1
10	"La mentira de Brian podría salir a la luz debido a un enemigo"	12 November 2024	5.7
11	"¿Brian encuentra el motivo por el que acabaron con Sonny?"	13 November 2024	5.7
12	"Katherine descubre un secreto de Vinicio"	14 November 2024	5.3
13	"¿Katherine conocerá toda la verdad acerca de Vinicio?"	18 November 2024	5.5
14	"Vinicio pierde el control al encontrar un video de Katherine"	19 November 2024	6.0
15	"Vinicio pone en riesgo el evento de Katherine"	20 November 2024	5.5
16	"Katherine le propone matrimonio a Vinicio"	21 November 2024	5.9
17	"Vinicio atormenta a Katherine en su luna de miel"	22 November 2024	5.5
18	"Victoria podría perder su trabajo por culpa de su familia"	25 November 2024	5.6
19	"Victoria recupera el dinero para no ser despedida"	26 November 2024	5.6
20	"Katherine duda que Sonny esté muerto y decide abrir su tumba"	27 November 2024	5.8
21	"¿Katherine descubrió que Vinicio es Brian O´Connor?"	28 November 2024	5.4
22	"Nicole se siente abrumada, ¿podría confesar la verdad?"	29 November 2024	4.8
23	"Se da a conocer una devastadora noticia sobre Katherine"	2 December 2024	5.0
24	"Victoria hace un importante descubrimiento en el caso"	3 December 2024	5.1
25	"Salen a la luz los detalles de la muerte de Sonny"	4 December 2024	5.4
26	"Se reabre el caso de Sonny y Raymundo enloquece"	5 December 2024	4.9
27	"Nicole y Dylan se casan en secreto en Bogotá"	6 December 2024	4.8
28	"Los secretos de Nicole y Katherine empiezan a salir a la luz"	9 December 2024	5.8
29	"Vinicio está decidido en confesarle la verdad a Victoria"	10 December 2024	5.8
30	"Dylan empieza a ver con otros ojos a Nicole y Vinicio"	11 December 2024	6.6
31	"Victoria le da un ultimátum a Vinicio sobre el caso de Sonny"	12 December 2024	5.3
32	"¿Qué estarían dispuestos a hacer los Obregón en su defensa?"	13 December 2024	5.0
33	"Los Obregón entregarán al culpable por la muerte de Sonny"	16 December 2024	5.5
34	"Victoria no cree en la confesión de la familia Obregón"	17 December 2024	5.5
35	"Los engaños de la familia Obregón llegan a su fin"	18 December 2024	4.9
36	"Vinicio podría quedar en evidencia por una acelerada decisión"	19 December 2024	5.9
37	"Katherine tiene un reencuentro con una persona de su pasado"	7 January 2025	6.2
38	"Vinicio se verá envuelto en el fallecimiento de Marcos"	8 January 2025	5.9
39	"Vinicio es investigado por la Policía, ¿conocen su secreto?"	9 January 2025	6.5
40	"Victoria termina su relación definitivamente con Vinicio"	10 January 2025	5.6
41	"Katherine busca la manera de estar junto a Vinicio"	13 January 2025	6.6
42	"Una enfermedad terminal cambiará los planes de alguien"	14 January 2025	N/A
43	"Victoria le dispara a Vinicio y todos saben que es Brian"	15 January 2025	N/A
44	"Katherine entra en crisis por la desaparición de Lucas"	16 January 2025	7.1
45	"Vinicio intenta hacer un trato con Antonio"	17 January 2025	6.7
46	"Vinicio se entera de que Federico secuestró a Lucas"	20 January 2025	7.3
47	"Victoria planea demostrar la inocencia de Vinicio"	21 January 2025	7.5
48	"Vinicio ejecuta un plan para lograr su libertad"	22 January 2025	7.6
49	"¿Vinicio logra escaparse de prisión?"	23 January 2025	7.9
50	"El verdadero culpable de la muerte de Sonny sale a la luz"	24 January 2025	6.7
51	"Vinicio ingresa a cirugía"	27 January 2025	7.7
52	"Antonio busca un aliado para hacer justicia"	28 January 2025	7.0
53	"Un nuevo aliado de Vinicio llegará a la ciudad"	29 January 2025	8.3
54	"Se conoce la verdad sobre el fallecimiento de Vinicio"	30 January 2025	7.4
55	"Dylan descubre que las advertencias de Vinicio eran reales"	31 January 2025	7.2
56	"Victoria y Antonio dan un paso importante en su relación"	3 February 2025	8.2
57	"Katherine puede ser un inconveniente en los planes de Ania"	4 February 2025	6.4
58	"Ginna descubre el plan de Dylan por un descuido"	5 February 2025	7.6
59	"Antonio le confiesa la verdad a Victoria"	6 February 2025	6.9
60	"Vinicio hace justicia por el fallecimiento de Sonny"	7 February 2025	8.4

== Reception ==
=== Ratings ===
Season	Timeslot (COT)	Episodes	First aired		Last aired		Avg. viewers (in points)
Season	Timeslot (COT)	Episodes	Date	Viewers (in points)	Date	Viewers (in points)	Avg. viewers (in points)
1	Mon–Fri 9:30 p.m.	58	28 October 2024	7.2	7 February 2025	8.4	6.2

=== Awards and nominations ===
Year	Award	Category	Nominated	Result	Ref
2025	Produ Awards	Best Superseries	Escupiré sobre sus tumbas	Nominated	
2025	Produ Awards	Best Lead Actress - Superseries	Essined Aponte	Nominated	
2025	Produ Awards	Best Lead Actor - Superseries	Cristian Gamero	Nominated	
2025	Produ Awards	Best Supporting Actress - Superseries	María Elisa Camargo	Nominated	
2025	Produ Awards	Best Supporting Actress - Superseries	Melanie del Olmo	Nominated	
2025	Produ Awards	Best Supporting Actor - Superseries	José Narváez	Nominated	
2025	Produ Awards	Best Directing - Superseries or Telenovela	Mónica Botero & Carlos Mario Urrea	Nominated	
2025	Produ Awards	Best Producer - Superseries or Telenovela	Asier Aguilar	Won	
