= Antonio Jiménez =

Antonio Jiménez may refer to:

- Antonio Jiménez (baseball), Cuban baseball player, see Industriales
- Antonio Jiménez (athlete) (born 1977), Spanish steeple chase runner
- Toni Jiménez (born 1970), Spanish soccer player
- Antonio Jimenez (actor), Colombian actor
- Antonio Jiménez Quiles, Spanish road cyclist
