= El Joe, la leyenda =

- 2011 promotional poster Jair Romero
- Genre: Biopic
- Created by: Andrés Salgado
- Screenplay by: Andrés Salgado; Natalia Ospina
- Directed by: Herney Luna
- Starring: Jair Romero
- Country of origin: Colombia
- Original language: Spanish
- No. of series: 1
- No. of episodes: 119

Production
- Producer: Guillermo Restrepo

Original release
- Network: RCN Televisión
- Release: 30 May – 20 December 2011

The Joe, the Legend (Spanish: El Joe, la leyenda) is a 119-episode Colombian television biopic. It is inspired by the life and works of singer Joe Arroyo. Jair Romero starred as Joe Arroyo. Mauro Castillo and Estefanía Borges also starred as Wilson Manyoma and Jacqueline Ramón, respectively. Produced by Guillermo Restrepo, the TV show was a RCN Televisión production. It was originally broadcast from 30 May to 20 December 2011.

Positively reviewed in Colombia, El Joe, la leyenda was honored with the Premios India Catalina award for best soap opera.

== Plot ==
Joe Arroyo started his singing career in the 1970s, with local performances in the Colombian Caribbean region. Musician Julio Estrada (aka Fruko) discovered Arroyo's talent during Barranquilla's Carnival and asked him to be a part of the Fruko y sus Tesos band. He would then go on to form the orchestra La Verdad in 1981.

Arroyo is depicted in the first episodes as a young, attractive and courageous man that during a carnival falls in love with Jaqueline Ramón, daughter of the owner of a local music label. Arroyo is soon engulfed in a love triangle.

A sad part of Arroyo's life was captured in the series when his mother Ángela died.

The serial also focuses on Arroyo's struggle to succeed in the musical business and uses the lyrics from his most popular songs as a narrative device throughout the episodes.

== Cast ==
- Jair Romero as Joe Arroyo
- Mauro Castillo as Wilson Manyoma
- Estefanía Borge as Jacqueline Ramón
- Kimberly Reyes as Luz Mary
- Carlos Mariño as Enrrique Carrillo
- Walter Días as Piper Pimienta
- Diana Wiswell as Daniela
- Alejandro Palacio as Pepe Leal
- Víctor Hugo Trespalacios as Eugenio Trespalacios
- Jeymmy Paola Vargas as Adela Martelo
- Ana Lucía Silva as María Inés
- Diego Martín Vásquez as Gustavo García
- Juan Alfonso Baptista as Iván Nava
- Ilja Rosendahl as Dr Henríquez
- Felipe Calero as Chelito de Castro
- María Isabel Henao as Nancy Bernal de Carrillo
- Patricia Tamayo as Myriam Roca
- Martín Armenta as Roberto Solano
- Sebastián Sánchez as Juventino Requejo
- Diego Vásquez as Julio Ernesto Estrada "Fruko"
- Andrés Suárez as Francisco Vergara
- Horacio Tavera as Pedro Spirko
- Carmenza Gómez as La tía 'Ceci'
- Eileen Roca as Rosario
- Ramses Ramos as Víctor del Real
- Fernando Arévalo as Polo
- Magali Caicedo as Ángela González
- Santiago Miniño as Javier

== Production ==
Screenwriter Andrés Salgado started working on the project in 1999. Artist Joe Arroyo gave permission to the serial and personally recounted some of the anecdotes to the writing team.

Many locations around five cities (Cartagena, Barranquilla, Medellín, Bogotá and San Basilio de Palenque) were used for filming.
