= Antonio Jimenez (actor) =

Colombian actor (born 1985)

- Born: Antonio José Jiménez Puertas; May 22, 1985 (age 41); Cartagena, Colombia
- Occupations: Actor; Model
- Years active: 2008–present
- Children: 2 (adopted)

Antonio José Jiménez Puertas (Cartagena, Colombia, May 22, 1985) is a Colombian actor, physical trainer, and model, born and raised in a poor neighborhood of Cartagena, called Chapacuá.

== Early life and education ==
Toñito, as he is known in the neighborhood, is the youngest of four brothers. His mother Martha, a pensioner born in Cartagena, lives in this city, as well as his two sisters Karina and the eldest who is a nurse by profession. Jimenez and Jeymmy Paola Vargas, the actress and former beauty queen, have known each other and remained good friends since childhood.

He is a graduate from the Republic of Lebanon high school.

At the age of 15, he decided to move to Bogotá to fulfill his dream of being an actor. His sister, Martha Isabel, left Cartagena to accompany and support him.

Jiménez studied Criminal and Forensic Sciences, a career that he never pursued. Antonio says that he also began studying law, but abandon his studies to dedicate himself to acting.

== Career ==
Although his work as a model gave him the opportunity to act in small roles in soap operas, such as Oye Bonita, where he played a police officer in one of the episodes, the opportunity to work professionally came in 2012 in the soap opera ¿Donde carajos esta Umaña? (Where the hell is Umaña?). According to Jimenez, it was a small role, but it gave him the opportunity to get the training and confidence to face the castings that came later.

In 2013 and 2014 he worked on the two seasons of the series La Selección (es).

In December 2015, his sister, Martha Isabel, died due to a bacteria that affected her lungs. The actor then takes custody of her children, Marat, the youngest, and Brayan. After completing the procedures at the Colombian Institute of Family Welfare, he managed to obtain the adoption of his two nephews.

In 2022 it was announced that the actor would be part of the cast of 'La Suprema'. Actors Elizabeth Martínez, Antonio Jiménez and Pabla Flórez lead the cast of this film, a feature film inspired by the story of Antonio Cervantes, Kid Pambelé. Jiménez plays Efraín, the local coach and co-star in the movie that was filmed in the village of La Suprema (Marialabaja, Bolívar), winner of the best film at the Havana Film Festival, 2023 and chosen by the public as the best feature film in the Huelva Ibero-American Film Festival, Spain and Colombia's entry in the 2023 Toronto International Film Festival, Discovery section.

== Television ==
| Year | Title | Character | Canal |
|---|---|---|---|
| 2021 | Mano Dura | Óscar ‘La Tromba’ Pineda | Telecaribe |
| 2021 | Mil colmillos (es) | Sargento Márquez | HBO – Rhayuela Films |
| 2019 | Heart's Decree | Jonathan Rodríguez | RCN TV |
| 2019 | El General Naranjo | Cilantro | Fox Telecolombia |
| 2017 | La mamá del 10 | Edwin Toro | Caracol TV |
| 2017 | Déjala morir (es) | Pedro Echenique | Telecaribe |
| 2016-2017 | Las Vega's | Robinsón Garzón | RCN TV |
| 2014-2015 | La esquina del diablo | Capitán Enrique Andrade. | RTI Prod - Telemundo |
| 2014 | La Selección II | Fredy Rincón | Caracol TV |
| 2013 -2014 | La viuda negra | Tyler | RTI TV |
| 2013 | La Selección (es) | Fredy Rincón | Caracol TV |
| 2012 | Where the hell is Umaña? (es) | Abel Antonio | Caracol TV |

== Awards and nominations ==
=== India Catalina awards ===
| Year | Category | Telenovela or series | Result |
|---|---|---|---|
| 2014 (es) | Best Actor/Actress: Revelation of the Year (es) | La selección | Nominated |

=== TV and soap opera awards ===
| Year | Category | Telenovela or Series | Result |
|---|---|---|---|
| 2018 | TVyNovelas (Colombia) for the Best Antagonist (es) | La mamá del 10 | Nominated |
