= Selma Mutal =

Franco-Dutch composer

- Born: Lima, Peru
- Occupation: Film score composer
- Years active: 2005–present
- Website: selmamutal.com

Selma Mutal (born in Lima, Peru) is a Franco-Dutch film score composer. She is known for her collaborations with filmmakers Claudia Llosa, Javier Fuentes-León, and Tod Lending. Mutal has also scored films directed by Fabien Gorgeart, Piotr Dumala, Pola Rapaport, and Víctor García León, work for TV, and a Chanel campaign, among other things.

== Early life ==
Mutal was born in Lima, Peru to Dutch parents. She studied music composition at the National Conservatory of Amsterdam and film scoring at the École Normale de Musique in Paris. Mutal also studied piano improvisation with the jazz pianist and composer Misha Mengelberg.

== Career ==
Mutal embarked on her career composing for dance, theatre, and television. In 2003, she started working in film. French music publisher Frédéric Leibovitz Editeur produces many of her soundtracks.

== Filmography ==
- Common'hood Video Game (2022, dir. José Sanchez)
- The Best Families (Las Mejores Familias) (2020, dir. Javier Fuentes-León)
- El Día de mi Suerte, TV miniseries (2019, dir. Daniel Vega Vidal)
- Los Europeos (2019, dir. Víctor García León)
- Nadia Comaneci: la Gymnaste et le Dictateur (2016, dir. Pola Rapaport)
- Ederly (2016, dir. Piotr Dumala)
- All the Difference (2015, dir. Tod Lending)
- Making-of Behind the Scenes Karl Lagerfeld (2015 for Chanel)
- The Vanished Elephant (2014, dir. Javier Fuentes-León)
- Vezo, (2014, short film, dir. Tod Lending)
- Burden of Silence (2012, dir. Tod Lending)
- Contracorriente (Undertow) (2010, dir. Javier Fuentes-León)
- The Milk of Sorrow (La Teta Asustada) (2009, dir. Claudia Llosa)
- Madeinusa (2006, dir. Claudia Llosa)
- Emue & Furiosa (2004, dir. Fabien Gorgeart)

== Other work ==
- With Tarek Schmidt, original music for Corpo Barocco, the Nunzio Impellizzeri Dance Company, Zurich, 2018
- Soundtrack for Block'hood (video game, José Sanchez, 2017)
- Original music for In.Quieta Rooms, the Nunzio Impellizzeri Dance Company, 2017

== Awards and distinctions ==
- Best Soundtrack at the 2020 International Series Festival of Buenos Aires for the El Dia de Mi Suerte series
- Best Music, New Media, at the 2018 French Film Music Association Awards (Union des compositeurs de musiques de films) for Block'Hood soundtrack
- Best Original Soundtrack Award at the International Film Festival of Annonay, Ardèche, France for Undertow, 2010

=== Shared awards ===
- Best Gameplay Award, Games for Change festival, New York City, for Block'hood, 2016
- Toronto International Film Festival premiere for Javier Fuentes-León's The Vanished Elephant, 2014
- Sundance Film Festival premiere for Tod Lending's short film Vezo, 2014
- Sundance Film Festival, World Cinema Audience Award Dramatic for Fuentes-León's Undertow, 2011
- Academy Award nomination, Best Foreign Language Film for Claudia Llosa's The Milk of Sorrow, 2010
- The Golden Bear at the 2009 Berlin International Film Festival for The Milk of Sorrow
