= La jefa del campeón =

Mexican telenovela

- Promotional poster
- Genre: Telenovela
- Based on: La mamá del 10 by Héctor Rodríguez and Alejandro Torres
- Screenplay by: Ximena Suárez; Julián Aguilar
- Directed by: Walter Doehner; Víctor Herrera
- Starring: África Zavala; Carlos Ferro; Enrique Arrizon
- Opening theme: "Cuando nadie ve" by Morat
- Country of origin: Mexico
- Original language: Spanish
- No. of seasons: 1
- No. of episodes: 63

Production
- Executive producer: Roberto Gómez Fernández
- Producer: Silvia Cano
- Camera setup: Multi-camera
- Production company: Televisa

Original release
- Network: Las Estrellas
- Release: 11 June – 2 September 2018

La jefa del campeón (English title: Heart of a Champion) is a Mexican telenovela produced by Roberto Gómez Fernández that premiered on 11 June 2018, on Las Estrellas and concluded on 2 September 2018. It stars África Zavala and Carlos Ferro. In the United States it premiered on UniMás on 10 July 2018 and ended on 10 October 2018.

== Plot ==
You never said it would be easy, but you were stronger than any lie, you are bigger than any challenge. Fulfilling our dreams made you invincible. Nobody notices your pain, nobody sees your tears. Your heart beats in silence and somebody finally somebody heard it. You believed in me and taught me not to give up, to fight for what I want, to fall. And to always get back up with more strength. Who else can give their life for a promise? Thanks, mom.

— Rey Bravo

Tita Menchaca (África Zavala) is a woman of limited resources, determined and very committed to moving forward with her children; Rey and her step-daughter, Fabiola. When she was abandoned by her husband Waldo (Alberto Agnesi), she moved to the capital to reorganize her life as a single mother. With the passage of time and hope, her son Rey dreams of being one of the best footballers in the country, which drives Tita to do everything possible to help him achieve his dream, no matter how difficult it will be.

== Cast ==
- África Zavala as Renata "Tita" Menchaca
- Carlos Ferro as Daniel "La Bomba" Rodríguez
- Enrique Arrizon as Reinaldo "Rey" Bravo Menchaca
  - Luca Valentini as Child Rey
- Vanessa Bauche as Martina Morales
- Dagoberto Gama as El Coronel
- José Carlos Rodríguez as Sergio "Checo" Coyote
- Claudia Ramírez as Nadia Padilla de Linares
- Marisol del Olmo as Salomé Salas
- Luis Gatica as Emiliano
- Héctor Kotsifakis as Dante Chimal
- Zaide Silvia Gutiérrez as Sara
- Édgar Vivar as Pedro
- Alberto Agnesi as Waldo Bravo
- Alejandra Robles Gil as Fabiola Bravo Mendez
  - Shaula Ponce De León as Child Fabiola
- Gemma Garoa as Beba
- Adalberto Parra as El Chino
- Mario Zaragoza as Arnulfo
- Raúl Coronado as Delfino
- Axel Rico as Froylán
- Andrea Guerrero as Maika
- Josh Gutiérrez as Matías
- Fernanda Urdapilleta as Valeria
  - Victoria Viera as Child Valeria
- Sofía Campomanes as Frida
  - Johana Zarzar as Child Frida
- Patricia Martínez as Malena
- Gina Pedret as Inés
- Lalo Palacios as Gonzo Coyote
  - Ricardo Zertuche as Child Gonzo
- David Caro Levy as Quique
  - André Real as Child Quique
- Marcela Ruiz Esparza as Karina
- Rodrigo Virago as Arsenio
- Quetzalli Cortés as Celso
- Axel Trujillo as Aníbal
- Cristian Ramos as Joel
- Nuria Gil as Rufis
- Federico Espejo as Nelson
- Alejandra Ambrosi as Ángela
- Marco Antonio Tostano as José Antonio

== Production ==
On 23 April 2018, Mexican television company Televisa stated filming began of the Mexican version of the Colombian telenovela La mamá del 10. Roberto Gómez Fernández executive producer of the telenovela, created the telenovela in order to support the 2018 FIFA World Cup. The adaptation for Mexico is made by Ximena Suárez and Julián Aguilar, while the direction is in charge of Walter Doehner and Víctor Herrera.

== Ratings ==
=== Mexico ratings ===
Viewership and ratings per season of La jefa del campeón
Season	Episodes	First aired		Last aired		Avg. viewers (millions)
Season	Episodes	Date	Viewers (millions)	Date	Viewers (millions)	Avg. viewers (millions)
1	63	11 June 2018	4.7	2 September 2018	2.3	2.46

=== U.S. ratings ===
Viewership and ratings per season of La jefa del campeón
Season	Episodes	First aired		Last aired		Avg. viewers (millions)
Season	Episodes	Date	Viewers (millions)	Date	Viewers (millions)	Avg. viewers (millions)
1	63	10 July 2018	0.28	10 October 2018	0.34	0.26

== Episodes ==
No.	Title	Original air date	U.S. air date	Mexico viewers (millions)	U.S. viewers (millions)
Part 1
1	"Tita empieza una nueva vida en la ciudad"	11 June 2018	10 July 2018	4.7	0.28
Tita promises to Rey that one day he will become a great soccer star. Toño threatens Tita with hurting her children if Waldo does not pay his debt. Tita confesses to Pedro that they want to kill their children. Waldo leaves his family to escape his debts and Tita must go to Mexico City to protect her children.
2	"Tita le prohibe a Waldo estar cerca de sus hijos"	12 June 2018	11 July 2018	2.4	0.37
Waldo manages to find Tita in the city and tries to apologize for running away without telling her anything. Tita no longer believes in his lies and forbids him from being close to her children.
3	"Rey descubre que Waldo le es infiel a Tita"	13 June 2018	12 July 2018	2.9	0.38
Emiliano convinces Nadia to give Tita a job. Rey is accepted into a soccer school. Waldo takes advantage of Martina and makes her invest in his business. Rey discovers Waldo kissing with Martina and escapes without saying anything to anyone. Tita worries about not knowing where her son is.
4	"Tita y Waldo se encuentran con La Bomba Rodríguez"	14 June 2018	13 July 2018	3.0	0.33
Rey's trainer harasses Tita in exchange for giving her son a chance. Rey reproaches Waldo for kissing Martina, but he convinces him not to tell Tita anything. Tita and Waldo meet the idol of Rey, 'La Bomba' Rodríguez, who this time does not manage to go unnoticed.
5	"Tita es detenida por la policía"	15 June 2018	16 July 2018	2.5	0.36
Martina and Waldo try to sell the stolen jewels, but they are surprised by the police. Martina accuses Tita of being an accomplice of Waldo and is arrested. Waldo flees to Tijuana. Tita makes a proposal to 'La Bomba' Rodríguez.
6	"La Bomba Rodríguez es el nuevo entrenador de Rey"	18 June 2018	17 July 2018	2.7	0.26
Tita manages to get La Bomba Rodríguez to agree to train Rey, in exchange she offers her support so he can stop drinking. Martina tells Fabiola that her father is a thief and is fleeing from the police. Fabi claims to Tita that she did not tell her the truth about Waldo.
7	"Tita renuncia a su trabajo"	19 June 2018	18 July 2018	2.7	0.30
Fabiola wants to go in search of her father, but La Bomba manages to convince her to return home. After a discussion with Nadia, Tita quits her job and must return to sell on the street. Emiliano reproaches Nadia for letting Tita quit. Tita starts her own business selling items sold to her by Chino.
8	"Rey da sus primeros pasos como futbolista profesional"	20 June 2018	19 July 2018	2.7	0.30
Daniel feels in family after a long time, with the support of Tita manages to overcome his addiction to alcohol and together they form a football team with which he starts the career of Rey as a footballer. Daniel is reunited with Dante, who insults him. Froylán and Salomé argue and he asks for a divorce.
Part 2
9	"Daniel le pide a Tita que vivan juntos"	21 June 2018	20 July 2018	2.5	0.22
Rey and Fabi agree that their mother has a relationship with Daniel, but everything gets complicated when he must choose between his career as a technical director and away from the woman he loves. Daniel proposes to Tita to go live with him.
10	"Daniel siente celos de Delfino"	22 June 2018	23 July 2018	2.4	0.31
Delfino arrives in the city to meet Tita again, but is disappointed to learn that she has a relationship with La Bomba, while Daniel feels at a disadvantage when meeting Delfino. El Chino orders to destroy the merchandise of Tita. Salomé discovers Froylán and Beba kissing.
11	"Rey es seleccionado para entrar a los Búfalos"	25 June 2018	24 July 2018	2.5	0.27
After receiving threats, Tita decides to go live with Daniel, but Rey is selected to enter the Búfalos and refuses to miss the opportunity to start his career as a footballer.
12	"Tita y Daniel se comprometen"	26 June 2018	25 July 2018	2.3	0.26
Tita discovers the true intentions of Dante and refuses to sign the first contract of Rey. Daniel gives Tita an engagement ring, with the promise that one day they will get married.
13	"Fabi y Matías deciden casarse"	27 June 2018	26 July 2018	2.4	0.23
Rey believes that they are not appreciating him in the Búfalos and he decides to play in another team and go live in Costa Hermosa with Tita and Daniel. Matías insists that he loves Fabi and they plan to get married as soon as possible.
14	"Tita firma el contrato de Rey con los Búfalos"	28 June 2018	27 July 2018	2.9	0.22
Tita receives a new proposal from the Búfalos and signs Rey's first contract with the club. Rey declares his love for Frida and she agrees to be his girlfriend. Daniel says goodbye to Tita to fulfill his dream.
15	"Rey se escapa a una fiesta con los Búfalos"	29 June 2018	30 July 2018	1.9	0.25
Thanks to Tita, Rey manages to meet the players of the Búfalos, his idol Nelson invites him to a party at his home and he agrees to go without telling anyone. Rey is reunited with Valeria.
16	"Valeria y Rey pasan la noche juntos"	2 July 2018	31 July 2018	2.0	0.25
Rey lives his first love affair and spends the night with Valeria. Upon learning that Rey was with another woman, Frida ends their relationship. Froylán puts a trap on Salomé and discovers her real job. Fabi tells Rey that Frida left the pensión.
17	"Tita le da una lección a Rey"	3 July 2018	2 August 2018	2.2	0.23
The problems between Tita and Rey continue and after discovering that he has not shown up at school to spend time with Valeria, Tita deprives Rey of the possibility of debuting with the Búfalos.
18	"Tita y Daniel hacen una promesa de amor"	4 July 2018	3 August 2018	2.2	0.25
Daniel and Tita decide to separate only for a while so that Rey can continue studying, both give themselves to love with the desire to marry and start a family. Tita and Rey are reconciled, but she asks him not to leave school. Frida confesses to Beba that she is in love with Rey.
19	"Daniel pide la mano de Tita"	5 July 2018	6 August 2018	2.4	0.27
Matías asks Fabi to marry her and Daniel asks Pedro for Tita's hand. Delfino and Martina set a trap for Chino to let the police discover his dirty business.
20	"Salomé atropella a Tita"	6 July 2018	7 August 2018	2.1	0.25
Delfino tries to kiss Tita, but Daniel arrives to prevent it and after a strong argument, the engagement between Tita and Daniel ends. Tita is run over by Salomé and her lover. After ending his engagement with Tita, Daniel tries to drink alcohol again.
21	"Tita está secuestrada"	9 July 2018	8 August 2018	2.2	0.22
Tita is kidnapped by Salomé, Daniel desperately seeks her until he receives a call asking him for money in exchange for her freedom. Rey signs with Dante and gets the ransom money.
22	"La vida de Rey corre peligro"	10 July 2018	9 August 2018	2.6	0.23
Daniel is dismissed as technical director of the Cocoteros. Tita learns that Rey signed a contract with Dante. Daniel and Tita are reconciled. Rey is attacked because of Quique and causes serious injuries that leave his life in danger.
23	"Matías admite que no está enamorado de Fabi"	11 July 2018	10 August 2018	2.5	0.17
The day of Fabi's wedding arrived, but it could be canceled after the unexpected return of René, the true love of Matías. Frida learns that Salomé is engaged in prostitution. Rey tells Valeria that Frida is his girlfriend. El Coronel tries to conquer Martina. René tells Matías that it is not fair that he marries Fabi if he is homosexual.
24	"Tita sorprende a Frida y Rey en la cama"	12 July 2018	13 August 2018	2.6	0.24
Frida and Rey are carried away by passion, but they are about to be discovered by Tita. Fabi and Matías get married in the pensión. Martina and El Coronel begin a relationship. Gonzo discovers that his dad paid the players for him to debut with the Búfalos.
25	"Frida podría estar embarazada"	13 July 2018	14 August 2018	2.2	0.24
Frida is afraid of being pregnant after having relations with Rey without protection. Rey and Quique are reconciled. Gonzo confesses to Rey what his dad did. Tita discovers that Quique flees from the police, and is called to testify.
26	"Rey es convocado a la selección"	16 July 2018	15 August 2018	2.6	0.27
Thanks to the effort, Rey is summoned along with Quique and Gonzo to play in the U-17 team, but in order to travel to Europe and fulfill his dream, the authorization of Tita and Waldo is necessary. El Coronel asks Martina to marry him. Frida confesses to Beba that she thinks she is pregnant.
27	"Frida y Rey van a tener un hijo"	17 July 2018	16 August 2018	2.7	0.28
Frida realizes that she is pregnant, but she does not want Rey to sacrifice his dream and she prefers to get away from him. Tita is about to find Waldo, so she decides to go and look for him with Daniel's help. She discovers that Waldo has another woman. Fabi believes that Matías is homosexual. Tita learns that Waldo died.
28	"Tita se entera que Rey sera papá"	18 July 2018	20 August 2018	2.6	0.29
Fabi confronts Matías for having married her without loving her. Before starting his trip to Europe, Rey tells Tita that Frida is expecting a child. Tita tells Fabi y Rey that Waldo died. Rey is going to Europe.
29	"Salomé corre a todos de la pensión"	19 July 2018	21 August 2018	2.2	0.22
Fabi is devastated and decides to end her marriage with Matías. Salomé explodes when she discovers that Rey got Frida pregnant and to get revenge on Tita, she evicts everyone from her pension. Rey returns to Mexico after playing in Europe and Froylán faces him because of Frida's pregnancy.
30	"Tita es la nueva dueña de la pensión"	20 July 2018	24 August 2018	2.2	0.23
The pension is evicted just as Salomé demanded, but now that Rey has become a professional soccer player and they have enough money, Tita manages to recover the pension. Arnulfo ends with Salomé, but tells her that she will have to work for him to pay him everything she owes him.
31	"Rey consigue ser futbolista profesional"	23 July 2018	27 August 2018	2.3	0.25
Rey manages to be number 10 of the Búfalos at a professional level, with his new ownership he will carry on his uniform the surname of his mother and will pay homage to Daniel, by using "Bomba Menchaca". The collectors threaten Sergio with hurting Gonzo if he does not pay on time. Rey tells Quique and Gonzo that he will ask Frida to marry him.
32	"Valeria y Rey se reencuentran"	24 July 2018	28 August 2018	2.4	0.20
Tita organizes a game to help Sergio, where Rey suffers a serious injury that prevents him from continuing his career as a footballer, he is devastated until he discovers that Valeria returned. Quique finds out that he will be the Rey's replacement in the Búfalos.
33	"Matías acepta que es homosexual"	25 July 2018	29 August 2018	2.4	0.28
Joel gets drunk and confesses to everyone in the pension that Matías is homosexual. Matías assumes his responsibility, confronts Tita and manages to confess to his mother that he is homosexual. Rey tells Tita that he will travel with Valeria to Spain so that Emiliano can operate him and maybe help him get into a European soccer team. Frida supports Rey in his decision to travel to Europe, despite knowing that Valeria will go with him.
34	"Rey tiene una nueva esperanza para seguir jugando"	26 July 2018	30 August 2018	2.8	0.24
Rey decides not to go to Europe with Valeria to avoid problems with Nadia. Rey's operation is successful and everyone concentrates on his rehabilitation. Joel apologizes to Fabi, but she despises him for what he did.
35	"Tita y Beba son arrestadas"	27 July 2018	31 August 2018	2.6	0.23
Tita and Beba are arrested for the crime of trafficking in counterfeit bills and cell phone theft. Froylán remembers that he installed security cameras and finds a proof that will prove their innocence. Matías's mother tries to convince Fabi to return with him. Nelson starts having problems with Quique on the team.
36	"Salomé finge estar enferma"	30 July 2018	3 September 2018	2.5	0.29
Salomé fabricates that she has a terminal illness with the sole objective that Froylán stays by her side and forever forgets about Beba. El Coronel manages to prevent them from assaulting Tita and Beba.
37	"Frida pierde a su bebé"	31 July 2018	4 September 2018	2.6	0.24
Frida is taken to the hospital because of a strong pain in her stomach, to prevent Rey from missing his test with the Búfalos, she lies to him and does not tell him that she lost her baby. Salomé finds out that she really does have a terminal illness.
38	"Valeria quita a Frida del camino"	1 August 2018	5 September 2018	2.3	0.22
Valeria takes advantage of the fact that Frida lost her baby to ask her to leave Rey. Salomé asks Froylán to get married as her last wish before dying. Frida tells Rey that it is better to separate. Quique's mother is sad when she finds out that she can not be operated.
39	"Rey juega con los Chapulines y llegan a la final"	2 August 2018	6 September 2018	2.8	0.23
Rey joins the team led by Daniel and in a short time is positioned as the best scorer. Thanks to their effort the Chapulines reach the final and face the Búfalos. Froylán and Salomé get married. Salomé asks Tita to help her with her treatment because she does not want to die.
40	"Daniel y Dante recuperan su amistad"	3 August 2018	7 September 2018	2.2	0.23
Thanks to Julian, Daniel finds out about the cowardly act that Arsenio committed to destroy his career as a footballer. Dante offers an apology to La Bomba and promises to clear his name.
41	"Rey cumple su promesa y le regala un depa a Tita"	6 August 2018	10 September 2018	2.8	0.25
Rey receives his first payment as a professional footballer and surprises Tita by giving her a luxurious apartment. Nadia does not suspect that her new neighbors will be Rey and his family. Fabi suffers a faint and is taken to the hospital. Tita learns that Fabi has anemia and malnutrition. Nelson tries to convince Joel to destroy Rey's career.
42	"Nelson le roba fama a Rey"	7 August 2018	11 September 2018	2.7	0.17
Nelson takes it upon himself to tarnish Rey's reputation as a footballer and steals his chance to be the star of a toothpaste commercial. Nadia learns that Tita is her new neighbor. Nadia summons a meeting of condominium owners to humiliate Tita, but she manages to sympathize with everyone.
43	"Daniel y los Chapulines ganan la copa latinoamericana"	8 August 2018	12 September 2018	2.5	0.22
Tita travels with Daniel to support him while he leads the Chapulines, the effort of La Bomba is worth it and he manages to win the Latin American Cup. Beba suspects that José Antonio is falling in love with Tita. Daniel is reunited with his ex-girlfriend Ángela. Quique and Joel compete to win Fabi's love. Ángela confesses to Dante that he has not been able to forget Daniel.
44	"Quique y Fabi ya son novios"	9 August 2018	13 September 2018	2.5	0.27
Quique takes a risk and in his date with Fabi he asks for an opportunity, finally she agrees and they give their first kiss. Tita and Daniel celebrate their bachelor party. Quique discovers that Nelson and Joel want to ruin Rey's career.
45	"Waldo arruina la boda de Tita y Daniel"	10 August 2018	14 September 2018	2.5	0.29
In full religious ceremony Waldo appears and ruins the most important moment for Daniel. Tita flees the church and takes refuge in José Antonio's apartment.
46	"Daniel cree que Tita se acostó con José Antonio"	13 August 2018	17 September 2018	2.7	0.19
After her drunken stupor, Tita wakes up in José Antonio's bed without knowing what happened, when she arrives at her apartment everyone sees her arrive with men's clothes and Daniel thinks she slept with the neighbor. Waldo is run over, but he planned the accident. Tita confesses to Daniel that she spent the night with José Antonio, but she does not remember what happened, and he breaks up with her.
47	"Ángela se acerca nuevamente a Daniel"	14 August 2018	18 September 2018	2.5	0.23
Ángela talks to Daniel when she finds out that Tita left him on the altar, she offers him back her support and all her unconditional love. Fabi asks Tita to let Waldo stay in her apartment. Daniel finds out that Waldo is in Tita's house and gets angry with her. Tita asks Waldo for a divorce.
48	"Tita y Rey son los nuevos socios de Nadia"	15 August 2018	19 September 2018	2.3	0.34
Emiliano takes the presidency from Nadia and Tita joins the business of the advertising agency. Fabi learns that Ángela was Daniel's fiancee and her intentions with him. Tita learns that Daniel was reunited with her ex-fiancée.
49	"Rey se entera que Waldo tiene otra familia"	16 August 2018	20 September 2018	2.4	0.19
Rey and Fabi discover that Waldo has another wife and two children, so they demand that he get away from Tita and allow her to be happy with Daniel.
50	"Tita inicia una nueva etapa como empresaria"	17 August 2018	21 September 2018	2.1	0.24
Tita changes her look and begins her time as a partner in the agency. To start with the right foot, Tita proposes that Daniel is the main image of the new advertising campaign. Waldo plans to steal money from Rey little by little. Ángela convinces Daniel that José Antonio does not want Tita but Maika.
51	"Waldo y Nadia hacen equipo para acabar con Tita"	20 August 2018	24 September 2018	2.3	0.15
Waldo is in charge of the blackmailer Crisóforo and in exchange he asks Nadia to team up to get rid of Tita y Rey. Tita shows Daniel the divorce papers.
52	"José Antonio le declara su amor a Tita"	21 August 2018	25 September 2018	2.2	0.27
José Antonio breaks up with Maika and confesses to Tita that he is in love with her. Waldo signs the divorce papers with the intention of getting more money. El Coronel discovers that Martina cheated on him with Sergio and suffers a heart attack.
53	"Daniel termina con Tita y se refugia con Ángela"	22 August 2018	26 September 2018	2.3	0.24
Waldo tells Daniel that Tita is supposedly in love with José Antonio. Daniel decides to end with Tita for believing in Waldo's lies. Tita does not want to let him go, and when trying to fix things, surprises Ángela in a compromising situation with Daniel.
54	"Ángela y Daniel se casan"	23 August 2018	27 September 2018	2.2	0.23
Ángela takes advantage of Daniel's freedom and decides to marry him. Gonzo and Dante become their witnesses and Tita suffers when she finds out that the love of her life is already with another woman. Frida finds out that Salomé provoked the misunderstanding between Martina and Sergio.
55	"Frida sigue enamorada de Rey"	24 August 2018	28 September 2018	2.0	0.20
Frida steals a kiss from Rey and thanks him for paying Salomé's treatment. Rey is happy to know that Frida is still in love with him. Maika finds José Antonio kissing Tita. Don Pedro learns that Tita and Daniel broke up. Fabi discovers her dad with Nadia.
56	"Rey gana el campeonato y se corona como máximo goleador"	27 August 2018	1 October 2018	2.3	0.21
The Búfalos defeat the Cocoteros and win the championship. With 13 goals, Rey is named the top scorer and dedicates his triumph to Tita. Tita confronts Daniel and reproaches him for not having confidence. José Antonio confesses to Emiliano that he is in love with Tita.
57	"Joel y Nelson le ponen una trampa a Quique"	28 August 2018	2 October 2018	2.4	0.28
Joel and Nelson plan to have a party so that Quique falls into temptation and cheats on Fabi. After having obtained the title with the Búfalos, Rey receives an offer from Celta of Spain. Tita starts a relationship with José Antonio, following the advice of Don Pedro.
58	"Nelson acusa a Rey de ser un drogadicto"	29 August 2018	3 October 2018	2.5	0.26
Nelson is responsible for destroying the reputation of Rey by calling him a drug addict and also harming the health of Valeria. This controversy makes Rey lose his contract in Europe and the trust of his friends. The club finds out about Nelson's party and sanctions its players. Fabi believes that Quique was unfaithful.
59	"Don Pedro muere"	30 August 2018	4 October 2018	2.2	0.30
Don Pedro discovers that Waldo and Nadia intend to steal Rey's money. Waldo fears that his plan will be discovered, pushes Pedro and causes him to suffer severe head injuries. When arriving at the hospital, Tita breaks in tears when seeing her father die. Emiliano wants Valeria to return to a rehabilitation clinic.
60	"Rey llega a España"	31 August 2018	5 October 2018	2.2	0.25
Rey has his first training sessions in Europe, where a group of players try to make his life impossible. Daniel is accused of sexual harassment, because of Waldo and Nadia. Tita suffers for the death of Pedro. Sarita tells Daniel that she thinks Pedro was killed. José Antonio asks Tita to marry him.
61–63	"Frida y Rey vuelven a ser novios Waldo y Nadia van a la cárcel Tita se convierte en la jefa del campeón"	2 September 2018	8 October 2018 9 October 2018 10 October 2018	2.3	0.23 0.30 0.34
Froylan gives his daughter a trip to Spain so she can visit Rey. Love resurfaces again and both Frida and Rey enjoy their stay in Madrid. Daniel is finally free and determined to be happy, even if it means leaving aside his relationship with Ángela to get Tita back. Tita tells Daniel that she will marry José Antonio. With the help of Quique, Celso confesses that Nadia and Waldo participated in the theft of the agency. Waldo and Nadia begin to pay for all their crimes. Tita is surprised to learn that Waldo murdered her father. Nelson's soccer career is over. Tita is kidnapped by Chino in the prison. Tita is the victim of a riot in the hands of Waldo and the other inmates; However, the authorities makes her leave unharmed and with the firm idea of being happy next to Daniel. Frida and Rey are going to live in Spain. Rey lives his dream of playing in a world cup representing Mexico and Tita is proud of being the mother of a champion.

== Awards and nominations ==
Year	Award	Category	Nominated	Result
2019	TVyNovelas Awards	Best Actor	Carlos Ferro	Nominated
2019	TVyNovelas Awards	Best Direction of the Cameras	Walter Dohener, Victor Herrera, and Luis Rodriguez	Nominated
