= La marca del deseo =

- Also known as: The Mark of Desire
- Genre: Telenovela
- Created by: Julio Jíménez
- Developed by: Fox Telecolombia
- Written by: Daniella Castagno
- Directed by: Rodrigo Triana
- Starring: Stephanie Cayo & Juan Alfonso Baptista
- Country of origin: Colombia
- Original language: Spanish
- No. of episodes: 120

Original release
- Network: RCN Televisión (Colombia), Telefutura (USA)
- Release: March 24 – September 22, 2008

Related
- Las Juanas, Las Juanas (Mexico), Hijas de la Luna

La Marca Del Deseo (English: The Mark of Desire) is a Colombian telenovela that aired on Telefutura and RCN Televisión. The show was based on the Colombian telenovela Las Juanas. The show was recorded in locations around Santa Marta. The cast includes actors from Colombia, Mexico, Venezuela, and the United States.

== Biography ==
The story revolves around five young women named Maria Valentina, Maria Soledad, Maria Canela, Maria Claridad, and Maria Alegría who are marked for the same fate and the same curse. Without knowing it, they all set off on the same road to a place called Pueblo Escondido where they meet Reynaldo Santibáñez, who is apparently their father. Reynaldo is former sailor who had affairs with five other women in his sailor days because Digna, Reynaldo's wife would not sexually please him. Because of this, Reynaldo in his subsequent loneliness, goes looking for love in the arms of other women. All five women become pregnant and have daughters.

The day Reynaldo Santibáñez married Digna, turned out to be the worst day of his life. On that day, he and his descendants were condemned forever to unhappiness because of a curse that was set forth by a witch named Carmensa who had lost her daughter who was pregnant with Reynaldo's child the very same day that he and Digna got married due to difficulties in childbirth. Because she blames Reynaldo for her daughter's death, Carmensa curses him : "Their blood will be marked by desire. In every moment of happiness that brings desire, there will be intense pain!" To add to the curse, the marriage of Reynaldo and Digna will not bring any offspring either. Or, at least, this is the legend that has been woven around the Santibáñez family in the 30 years they have lived in Pueblo Escondido. Supposedly, the curse does not exist because Reynaldo and Digna were able to conceived a son named Luis Eduardo.

The legend appears to reflect aspects of the Santibáñez family's circumstances, as the marriage remains troubled despite the couple's wealth, influence, and their son, Luis Eduardo.

Nevertheless, o-by-one, the five illegitimate daughters of Reynaldo Santibáñez begin arriving in town. The five daughters are Maria Valentina, Maria Canela (chef), Maria Alegría (singer), Maria Soledad (Motocross) and Maria Claridad (Masseuse and Witch), each of whom has her own personality and different way of life, yet are joined by the same desire and by the same father.

The story deals chiefly with Maria Valentina and Luis Eduardo who are in love but, cannot be with each other because they are ostensibly sister and brother. What they don't know, however, is that Luis Eduardo is not Maria Valentina's brother.

It is revealed that Digna had an affair with Tomas Murillo, Reynaldo's enemy. Throughout the series, Tomas blackmails Digna to lure her to him once again. However, Thomas isn't the only enemy to the Maria's and Reynaldo. Leoparda and Alfredo conspire to try to buy El Tesoro, an island that brings in revenue to the Santibáñez daughters, Luis Eduardo, and Reynaldo. Leoparda lives in El Tesoro along with Alfredo but Alfredo also has a secret that nobody barely knows, he had an affair with Ursula, Luis Eduardo's girlfriend/Fiancé and his half sister Maria Soledad who is also Maria Valentina's sister while Alfredo has a relationship with Maria Valentina. Maria Valentina and Luis Eduardo try to forget the past between and move forward but can't hide their affections for one another throughout the series as they are with their partners (Alfredo and Ursula).

Reynaldo breaks down right before Luis Eduardo's wedding and he is diagnosed with a heart tumor where he later goes to Houston with Digna, Maria Valentina, and Luis Eduardo.

Digna soon discovers Valentina's relationship with Luis Eduardo and tries her best to separate them with the help of Ursula, who desires Luis Eduardo and pretends be in a wheelchair so that he would marry her but right before they get married she gets busted by him and the wedding gets canceled.

== Villains ==
- Digna Santibáñez (Reynaldo's wife)- She is a manipulative woman who only care for herself, she blames everything on Reynaldo and accuses him of being a cheater and a liar but she won't admit that she is a cheater and a liar too...
- Tomas Murillo( Reynaldo's enemy, Luis Eduardo's real father)- He is a sly of a man who only cares about money
- Leoparda (Secretly loves Manotas, wants El Tesoro)- is selfish women who is in love with Reynaldo and is jealous of everything and everyone who is happy
- Alfredo (Maria Valentina's ex-boyfriend, Maria Soledad's future husband)- is a liar and a cheater who sleeps with Ursula Luis Eduardo's girlfriend/Fiancé and Maria Valentina's half sister while he was dating Maria Valentina
- Ursula (Luis Eduardo's ex-girlfriend)- is a selfish bitch who sleeps with Alfredo while dating Luis Eduardo and pretends to be in a wheelchair so that Luis Eduardo marries her
- Manotas (Worker in Leoparda's Ranch, in love with Leoparda)
- Carmensa (Witch, who cursed the Santibáñez, friend to Maria Claridad)

== Protagonists ==
Actor	Character
Marcelo Buquet	Reynaldo de Santibáñez
Juan Alfonso Baptista	Luis Eduardo Santibáñez
Stephanie Cayo	Maria Valentina Santibáñez
Mimi Morales	Maria Soledad Santibáñez
Heydi Bermudez	Maria Canela Santibáñez
María Elisa Camargo	Maria Alegria Santibáñez
Orlando Miguel	Alfredo Pardo
Adriana Franco	Prudencia
Juan Sebastián Aragón	Martín Laguna
Gabriel Valenzuela	Esteban Falcón
Nórida Rodríguez	Leoparda Pardo
Lucas Velázquez	Jaime Muñoz
Fernando Solórzano	Conrado
Sandra Beltrán	Linda Pardo
Sara Corrales	Maria Claridad Santibáñez
Heidy Bermúdez	María Canela Santibañes
Cristóbal Errázuriz	Vicente
Constanza Gutiérrez	Carmenza Lurey
Pedro Palacio	Gabriel Santamarina
Katie Barberi	Digna de Santibáñez
Florina Lemaitre	Margarita

== Other characters ==
- Esteban (Maria Claridad's boyfriend, Reynaldo's doctor)
- Gabriel (Linda's husband)
- Lucas Velázquezas Jaime( Maria Alegría's boyfriend)
- Linda (Leoparda's daughter, Gabriels's wife)
- Lulu (Jaime's ex-girlfriend)
- Martin (Maria Canela's boyfriend/future husband)
- Margarita (Maria Soledad's mother)
- Prudencia (Maria Valentina's nanny)
- Anita (Sister of Carmensa, housemaid to Digna)
- Veronica (friend of Lulu's, Esteban's ex-girlfriend)
- Vicente (Margarita's boyfriend, Ursula's father)
