= Justin Chadwick =

English actor & director (born 1968)

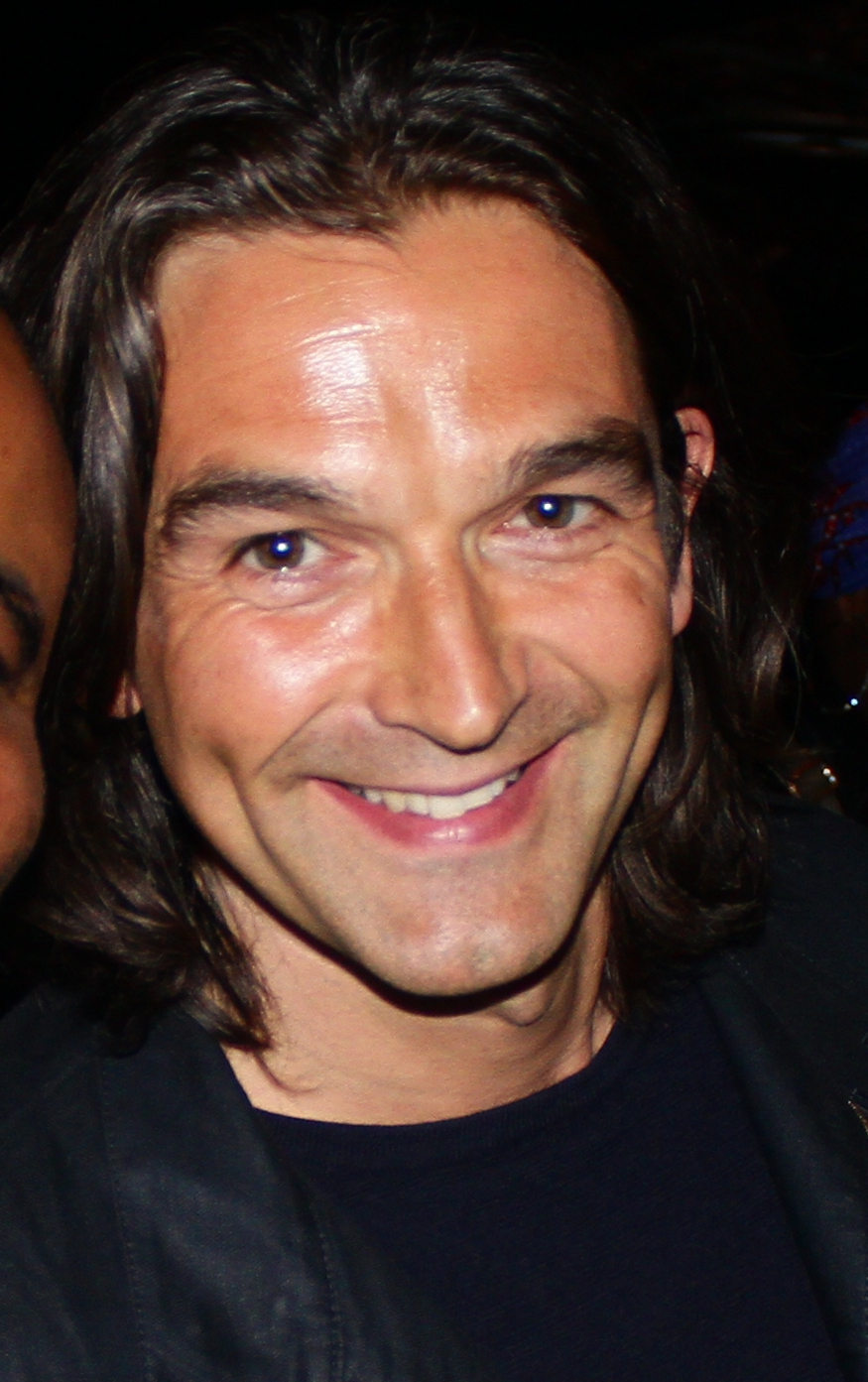
- In South Africa, 2012, while filming Mandela
- Born: 6 December 1968 (age 57); Salford, Lancashire, England
- Occupations: Actor, television, film director
- Years active: 1991–present

Justin Chadwick (born 6 December 1968) is an English actor and television and film director. He directed episodes of EastEnders, Byker Grove, The Bill, Spooks and Red Cap before directing nine of the fifteen episodes of the mini-series Bleak House, which was broadcast by the BBC in the UK and by PBS in the United States as part of its Masterpiece Theatre series.

Chadwick was nominated for the Primetime Emmy Award for Outstanding Directing for a Miniseries, Movie or Dramatic Special, the Royal Television Society Award for Breakout Performance Behind the Scenes and the BAFTA Award for Best Direction for Bleak House, which was the Best Drama Serial winner in the British Academy Television Awards 2006.

== Life and career ==
Chadwick was born in Salford, Lancashire. He began acting at the age of eleven.

He joined Bolton Little Theatre and played Billy Casper in Kes. He attended Turton High School in Bolton, before graduating from Leicester Polytechnic and in 1991 made his screen debut in London Kills Me. Other acting credits include The Loss of Sexual Innocence and appearances in the television dramas Heartbeat, Dangerfield, Dalziel and Pascoe and others.

Chadwick's directorial debut was the 1993 television film Family Style starring Ewan McGregor, after which he directed and performed in Shakespeare Shorts, a series that explored the history of Shakespearean characters and presented them in key scenes from the plays in which they appeared. He directed episodes of EastEnders, Byker Grove, The Bill, Spooks, Life Force and Red Cap before directing nine of the fifteen episodes of the mini-series Bleak House, which was broadcast by the BBC in the UK and by PBS in the United States as part of its Masterpiece Theatre series.

Chadwick was nominated for the Primetime Emmy Award for Outstanding Directing for a Miniseries, Movie or Dramatic Special, the Royal Television Society Award for Breakout Performance Behind the Scenes and the BAFTA Award for Best Direction for Bleak House, which was the Best Drama Serial winner in the British Academy Television Awards 2006. Bleak House was also nominated for two Golden Globes, four Royal Television Society Awards, three Broadcasting Press Guild Awards, three Satellite Awards, and the Television Critics Award.

Chadwick was the director of The Other Boleyn Girl, which was shown at the February 2008 Berlin International Film Festival. He worked on screen adaptations of Birdsong (released 2012) and Jamaica Inn in 2008. He completed the feature film The First Grader, which was released on 13 May 2010.

== Filmography ==
- Family Style (1993 short)
- London Kills Me (1991)
- Bleak House (2005, directed 9 of 15 episodes)
- The Other Boleyn Girl (2008)
- The First Grader (2010)
- Stolen (2011 TV movie)
- Mandela: Long Walk to Freedom (2013)
- The Money (2014 HBO pilot)
- Tulip Fever (2017)
- Next of Kin (2018 miniseries, directed 3 of 6 episodes)
- Brothers Under Fire (2026)
