= The Good Bandit =

Colombian telenovela

- Genre: Telenovela
- Created by: Juan Manuel Cáceres
- Screenplay by: Héctor Alejandro Móncada; Juan Manuel Cáceres; Elkim Ospina
- Directed by: Mario Ribero; Andrés Marroquín
- Creative directors: Guarnizo & Lizarralde
- Starring: Diego Vásquez; Carolina Acevedo; Ana María Arango; Álvaro Bayona; Katherine Porto; Tiberio Cruz; Norma Nivia; Felipe Calero; Jimena Durán; Andrés Toro; Sebastián Sánchez; Isabella Barragán
- Opening theme: "El pequeño Ortega" by Paola Jara
- Country of origin: Colombia
- Original language: Spanish
- No. of seasons: 1
- No. of episodes: 61

Production
- Executive producer: Juan Carlos Villamizar Delgado
- Production location: Bogota, Colombia
- Editor: José Luis Oróstegui
- Camera setup: Multi-camera
- Production company: Caracol Televisión

Original release
- Network: Caracol Televisión
- Release: 10 June – 9 September 2019

The Good Bandit (Spanish: Un bandido honrado), is a Colombian comedy telenovela created by Juan Manuel Cáceres, and is recorded in 4K Ultra-high-definition television. The series premiered on 10 June 2019 on Caracol Televisión, and concluded on 9 September 2019. The series stars Diego Vásquez as the titular character, along Carolina Acevedo, and Norma Nivia as the main antagonist.

The first episode of the series premiered with a total of 12.3 million viewers, becoming the most watched show that day and surpassing its competition Yo soy Betty, la fea, and occupying the first place as the most watched program nationwide. During its first month on the air, the series managed to position itself as the most watched in Colombia. Despite having been one of the most watched programs obtaining first place, the last episode of the series aired on 9 September 2019 obtained a total of 10.4 million viewers, occupying the third place as the most watched program nationwide.

The series is available via streaming on Netflix since 31 August 2019, only 63 episodes are shown on Netflix, unlike its original broadcast.

== Synopsis ==
A comedic story that follows the adventures of the repentant drug lord, willing to change his life to get away from the crimes and sins of the past. This story, full of humor, will tell the situations that a bandit who wants to learn to be good must experience. His path to redemption will be complicated, as he must make a great effort to distance himself from the temptations that the world outside the law brings.

== Cast ==
=== Main ===
- Diego Vásquez as Emilio de Jesús "El Crespo" Ortega Rangel

At the beginning of the plot, he is shown as a corrupt man, dedicated to illicit businesses, such as drug trafficking, bribery and conspiracy to commit crimes. However, these charges are never proven by the authorities, and the event that leads him to prison is the apparent "murder" of his enemy Diego Raigoso (Jorge Herrera), which is why he is sentenced to approximately 20 years in prison. captivity. After 5 years, Ortega suffers an accident while still in prison, in which he dies for a few moments. It is here when he has a revelation from his patron San Judas Tadeo (Julio Pachón), who gives him a second chance to return to life under the condition of becoming an honest man. Shortly after, it is shown that Raigoso never died, so Ortega is free, ready to completely change the course of his life with his wife Mile (Carolina Acevedo) and their two children. However, fate will hinder his purposes, when Natalia Peralta (Norma Nivia), his lawyer and lover, and Detective Ramírez (Andrés Toro), try to do everything possible to end his peace of mind.

- Carolina Acevedo as Milena Aponte de Ortega

She's the woman that every bandit would like to have. She is vain and somewhat capricious, but with a very good heart. She knows that her husband is one of the biggest criminals in the country, but she doesn't give it any importance, as she prefers to remain silent and enjoy all the luxuries to which he has accustomed her. When Ortega is arrested and convicted, she must take charge of her home and raise her children alone. Distraught, she waits impatiently for her husband to be released from prison; and when he achieves this, she supports him in his decision to move away from business outside the law, even if this means that she must give up her life of ostentation and abundance.

- Ana María Arango as Doña Raquel Rangel de Ortega

She is Emilio's always-approving mother. She had always dreamed of seeing his son commanding and directing; therefore, when he tells her that he will no longer be a drug trafficker but will dedicate himself to the family restaurant, Raquel reproaches him, alleging that he will not have any future if he walks away from the businesses to which he has dedicated himself for so many years. On the other hand, the woman does not tolerate her daughter-in-law Milena, so she always reproaches her son for having married a woman who had no aspirations. Ana María Arango is one of the most recognized actresses in Colombia.

- Álvaro Bayona as Horacio Muñoz

He is the personal accountant in Ortega's businesses. Brilliant with numbers and weak with women. He supports his boss in everything, helping him when required. Like him, he is a corrupt man, a lover of crooked and dirty tricks, because he knows that they represent a lot of money. When Ortega warns him that he will leave his illicit past behind, Horacio believes that it is a simple facade to "mislead the enemy" and continue committing crimes.

- Katherine Porto as Jopini

She is a revolutionary hitwoman who serves as Ortega's security chief. Jopini is independent, self-sufficient and self-confident. She is not afraid to confront anyone in order to protect her boss, and she has deep respect and great admiration for him. Her entire life has been dedicated to the security of drug lords and traffickers; therefore, when she realizes that her boss has put his criminal life aside, Jopini does not know what to do to survive, since she does not want to abandon Ortega and disappoint the loyalty that she shows him.

- Tiberio Cruz as Daniel Alberto Rodríguez "Pichuchas"

Mr. Ortega's "personal secretary." For many, he is a simple 'dogwasher' of a criminal (minor person in drug trafficking); for Emilio, he represents an unconditional friend. He is always attentive to what the boss orders and follows his lead in everything even if sometimes he does not agree. He feels a special liking for Jopini, but knows that theirs cannot be possible while they work for Ortega, because he told them that he does not tolerate emotional relationships between "band" colleagues; this is why they maintain a "quasi-dating" in secret.

- Norma Nivia as Natalia Peralta

Emilio Ortega's cosmopolitan lawyer. A classist, opportunistic and calculating woman, with brilliant intelligence and a great gift for words. In the midst of the judicial processes in her objective of proving her client's innocence, she begins a clandestine relationship with him, which later becomes an obsession for her. Seeing that, after leaving confinement, Ortega tries to evade and ignore her, Natalia begins to suffer from a dependency on him, trying to do everything possible to "get him back", even putting her own personal life and mental health at risk. According to Nivia herself, Natalia suffers from a kind of split personality complex, since when she performs her professional duties, she is the best; however, when she focuses on the personal, she begins to have shortcomings.

- Juan Manuel Restrepo as Tuto

Daniela's upstart boyfriend and Dylan Ortega's main rival. He makes his life miserable and always tries to make him look bad in front of the entire group. In one chapter, he causes a street fight in Doña Raquel's restaurant. For an entire arc, he helps the detectives Ramírez and Perea by spying Doña Raquel's restaurant.

- Felipe Calero as Andrés Morales

The corrupt, crafty and prejudiced politician, Natalia's friend. He was a candidate for the House of Representatives and now for the Senate of the Republic. In principle, he intends to create ties with Ortega, given that his illegal businesses can represent a valuable economic contribution to his campaign. He is a liar, cynical, opportunistic, homophobic, racist, and manipulative person. He represents the most vile in society, and is willing to do anything to obtain the political position he desires.

- Jimena Durán as Detective Consuelo Martínez

She is the rookie detective who arrives to partner with Ramírez in the AIP. She is naive and manageable. She feels an apparent attraction to her new co-worker, so she will try to support him in every way she can, even if this brings her problems and inconveniences with her superiors, such as her aunt.

- Andrés Toro as Detective Jairo Ramírez

He was the main perpetrator of the operation in which Ortega fell into the hands of the Police. He has always been obsessed with the idea of catching him, because he can't stand the thought that someone so corrupt can continue doing their thing without anyone doing anything. It is then, when Ortega is free after 5 years, that he sets out to go to the ultimate consequences to achieve the purpose that governs his life: capture him and send him to prison for life for his multiple crimes.

- Sebastián Sánchez as Dylan Julián Ortega Aponte

The eldest son of the Ortegas. Rebellious and unfriendly. He can't stand having to change his lifestyle, since he had always grown up in the midst of all kinds of wealth; therefore, he spends his time thinking about "what will they say." He doesn't like studying, instead he would prefer to dedicate himself to his father's crooked ex-business, which will bring him a lot of problems.

- Isabella Barragán as Mati Ortega Aponte

She is the youngest daughter of the Ortegas, "the princess of the house." Described as collaborative, friendly, tender, and intelligent. She is the counterpart of the ambitious Dylan.

=== Recurring ===
- Julio Pachón as San Judas Tadeo
- Paola Jara as Pamela Ramírez
- Freddy Ordóñez as Detective Perea
- Juan Carlos Solarte as Coronel Daza
- Jorge Herrera as Diego Raigoso
- Astrid Junguito as María del Pilar
- Alejandro Gutiérrez as Mauro
- Roger Moreno as Cara e' puño
- María Camila Rueda as Daniela "Dani"
- Marcela Forero as Yesi
- Juan Carlos Arango as Don Fercho
- Erick Rodríguez as Lalo
- Liliana González as Francy
