= Portraits in a Sea of Lies =

Retratos en un Mar de Mentiras, aka Portraits in a Sea of Lies
- Movie poster for "Retratos en un mar de mentiras"
- Directed by: Carlos Gaviria
- Written by: Carlos Gaviria
- Starring: Paola Baldion, Julián Román
- Cinematography: Edgar Gil
- Edited by: Carlos Gaviria
- Release date: 2010
- Running time: 90 minutes
- Country: Colombia
- Language: Spanish

Portraits in a Sea of Lies, released under the Spanish name Retratos en un Mar de Mentiras, is a 2010 Colombian drama film directed and written by Carlos Gaviria. The film won the Grand Paoa Prize as best international film at the 2010 Viña del Mar International Film Festival, and its star Paola Baldion won the award for best actress at the Guadalajara Film Festival.

== Plot ==
Following the death of his grandfather, Edgardo Román, in a mudslide, Jairo (Julián Román), a traveling photographer, and his cousin Marina (Paola Baldion), who is silent and suffer from amnesia, decide to reclaim the land from which they were displaced years ago. They embark on a journey from Bogotá to the Caribbean coast in an old, dilapidated Renault 4. During the trip, Marina starts to recall her traumatic past. Upon arriving in the town and announcing their intention to recover their land, they are kidnapped by paramilitaries.

In their attempt to escape, Jairo is injured. Marina goes to the ruins of her family's house to search for the deeds buried by her grandfather. There, she relives the massacre of her family. She returns with the deeds to where the wounded Jairo is and takes him to the sea, where she throws his body into the water after he dies.

== Cast ==
- Paola Baldion, as Marina
- Julián Román, as Jairo
- Edgardo Román, as Nepomuceno
- Valeria Fuentes, as Marinita
- Ana María Arango, as Esperanza
- Julia Marín, as Gladys, model
- Carolina Lizarazo, as Marina mother
- Carlos Hernández, as Marina father
- Susana Rojas, as Marina's sister
- Harold Córdoba, as new shopkeeper
- Roberto Barajas, as Agent Gonzáles.
- Ricardo Niño, as Agent Cabezas.
- José Pablo Díaz, as Agent Zúñiga.
- Alberto Marulanda, as "Shuassennager".
- Vladimir Espitia, as Don Juan.
- Ramsés Ramos, as Never, paramilitary chief
- Jorge Camargo, as paramilitary chief

== Reception ==
In 2016, film critic Jeronimo Rivera-Betancur of El Tiempo rated the film at No. 45 in his list of his favorite Colombian fiction films.
