= The Vanished Elephant =

2014 film

- Film poster
- Directed by: Javier Fuentes-León
- Written by: Javier Fuentes-León
- Starring: Salvador del Solar
- Cinematography: Mauricio Vidal
- Music by: Selma Mutal
- Production company: Tondero Producciones
- Release dates: 6 September 2014 (TIFF); 9 October 2014 (Peru)
- Running time: 109 minutes
- Countries: Peru; Colombia; Spain
- Language: Spanish

The Vanished Elephant (Spanish: El elefante desaparecido) is a 2014 internationally co-produced psychological thriller mystery film written and directed by Javier Fuentes-León.

== Plot ==
A crime novelist is tormented by the very character he created.

== Cast ==
- Salvador del Solar as Edo Celeste
- Angie Cepeda as Mara de Barclay
- Lucho Cáceres as Rafael Pineda
- Vanessa Saba as Celia Espinoza
- Andrés Parra as Ferrer
- Tatiana Astengo as Fiscal Sanchez
