= Diego Vásquez (actor) =

Colombian actor and screenwriter (born 1964)

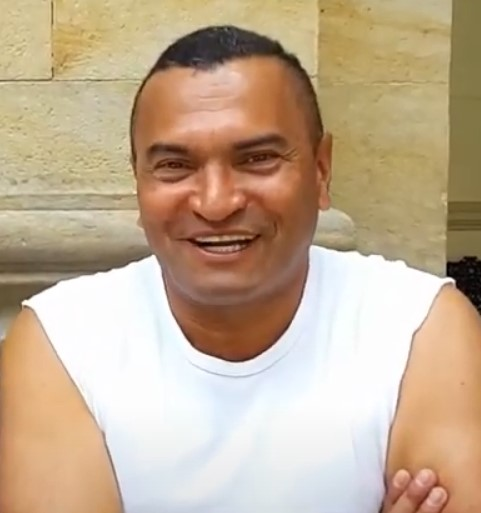
- Vásquez in 2017
- Born: Diego Javier Vásquez Camayo; 24 March 1964 (age 62); Ibagué, Colombia
- Education: City College of San Francisco; Laney College; National University of Colombia
- Occupation: Actor
- Years active: 1995–present
- Children: 1
- Website: diegovasquezactor.com

Diego Javier Vásquez Camayo (born 24 March 1964) is a Colombian actor. He is best known for his roles in the television series The Mafia Dolls (2009–2010), El Chapo (2017), and La mamá del 10 (2018). In 2024, he played José Arcadio Buendía in the Netflix television series One Hundred Years of Solitude, based on the 1967 novel of the same name by Gabriel García Márquez.

== Early life ==
Vásquez was born in Ibagué. He lived in the United States for five years, studying film at City College of San Francisco and television production at Laney College in Oakland, California. He later returned to Colombia to study civil engineering and geology at the National University of Colombia. During his studies, he began acting with the Teatro Estudio.

== Career ==
In 2008, Vásquez wrote the screenplay for the film Gabriel's Passion. From 2022 to 2023, he played Onofre Duarte in the RCN Televisión series Leandro Díaz. In 2024, he played José Arcadio Buendía in the Netflix television series One Hundred Years of Solitude, based on Gabriel García Márquez's 1967 novel of the same name. For the role, he took a course in Latin and learned to write right-handed.

== Personal life ==
Vásquez has one son, Daniel.

== Filmography ==
=== Film ===
Year	Title	Role	Notes	Ref.
1995	El alma del maíz	Lorenzo		
2000	Terminal			
2001	La pena máxima	Neighbor		
2001	The Invisible Children	Vendor		
2002	Como el gato y el ratón	Kennedy		
2002	Te busco	Carmelo		
2003	Malamor			
2003	La primera noche	Uncle Joaquín		
2004	Mission Movie	René		
2007	Satanás	Alberto		
2008	Gabriel's Passion	Profe Luna	Also writer	
2016	El paseo 4	Alberto Rubio		
2019	Los fierros	Don Alberto		
2023	Freelance			
2026	Brothers Under Fire	Fernando		

=== Television ===
Year	Title	Role	Notes	Ref.
1995	Caballos de fuego	Gavilán Punch		
1996	Cazados	Toño		
1997–1998	La Mujer del Presidente	Cabo Edison Abril		
1998	La sombra del arco iris	Ronaldo	114 episodes	
1998–1999	La dama del pantano	Jíbaro	Supporting role	
1999	Marido y mujer	Darío	108 episodes	
1999–2000	Me llaman Lolita	Humberto Antonio Corredor Santofimio	3 episodes	
2000–2001	Traga maluca	Colonel Gonzáles	Supporting role	
2006	Sin tetas no hay paraíso	Caballo	23 episodes	
2007	El Zorro, la espada y la rosa	Leroy	15 episodes	
2008–2009	Los protegidos	Careniña	1 episode	
2009–2010	The Mafia Dolls	Norman Alberto Zarama	Main role; season 1	
2011	El Joe, la leyenda	Julio Ernesto "Fruko" Estrada Rincón	133 episodes	
2012–2013	Pobres Rico	Carlos "El Gladiador" Siachoque	Main role	
2014	La selección	Ignacio "Nacho" Villa	Supporting role	
2015	Esmeraldas	Patricio Ortega	Main role	
2016	En la boca del lobo	Élmer Calleja	Supporting role	
2016	The Girl	Colonel Luis Eduardo Barragán	3 episodes	
2017	El Chapo	Don Ismael Zambrano	27 episodes	
2017	Sin senos sí hay paraíso	El Indio	3 episodes	
2018	La mamá del 10	Colonel Agapito Dangond	67 episodes	
2019	The Good Bandit	Emilio "El Crespo" Ortega	60 episodes	
2022–2023	Leandro Díaz	Onofre Duarte	80 episodes	
2024	One Hundred Years of Solitude	José Arcadio Buendía	6 episodes	
TBA	Los 39	Main role		

== Awards and nominations ==
Award	Year	Category	Nominated work	Result	Ref.
India Catalina Awards	2012	Best Supporting Actor	El Joe, la leyenda	Nominated	
India Catalina Awards	2013	Best Supporting Actor	Pobres Rico	Won	
India Catalina Awards	2017	Best Antagonistic Actor	The Girl	Won	
International Emmy Awards	2025	Best Actor	One Hundred Years of Solitude	Pending	
Macondo Awards	2010	Best Supporting Actor	Gabriel's Passion	Nominated	
TVyNovelas Awards Colombia	2010	Best Antagonistic Actor	The Mafia Dolls	Nominated	
TVyNovelas Awards Colombia	2012	Best Supporting Actor	El Joe, la leyenda	Nominated	
TVyNovelas Awards Colombia	2013	Best Supporting Actor	Pobres Rico	Won	
TVyNovelas Awards Colombia	2017	Best Antagonistic Actor	The Girl	Nominated	
