= María Elisa Camargo =

Ecuadorian actress and activist

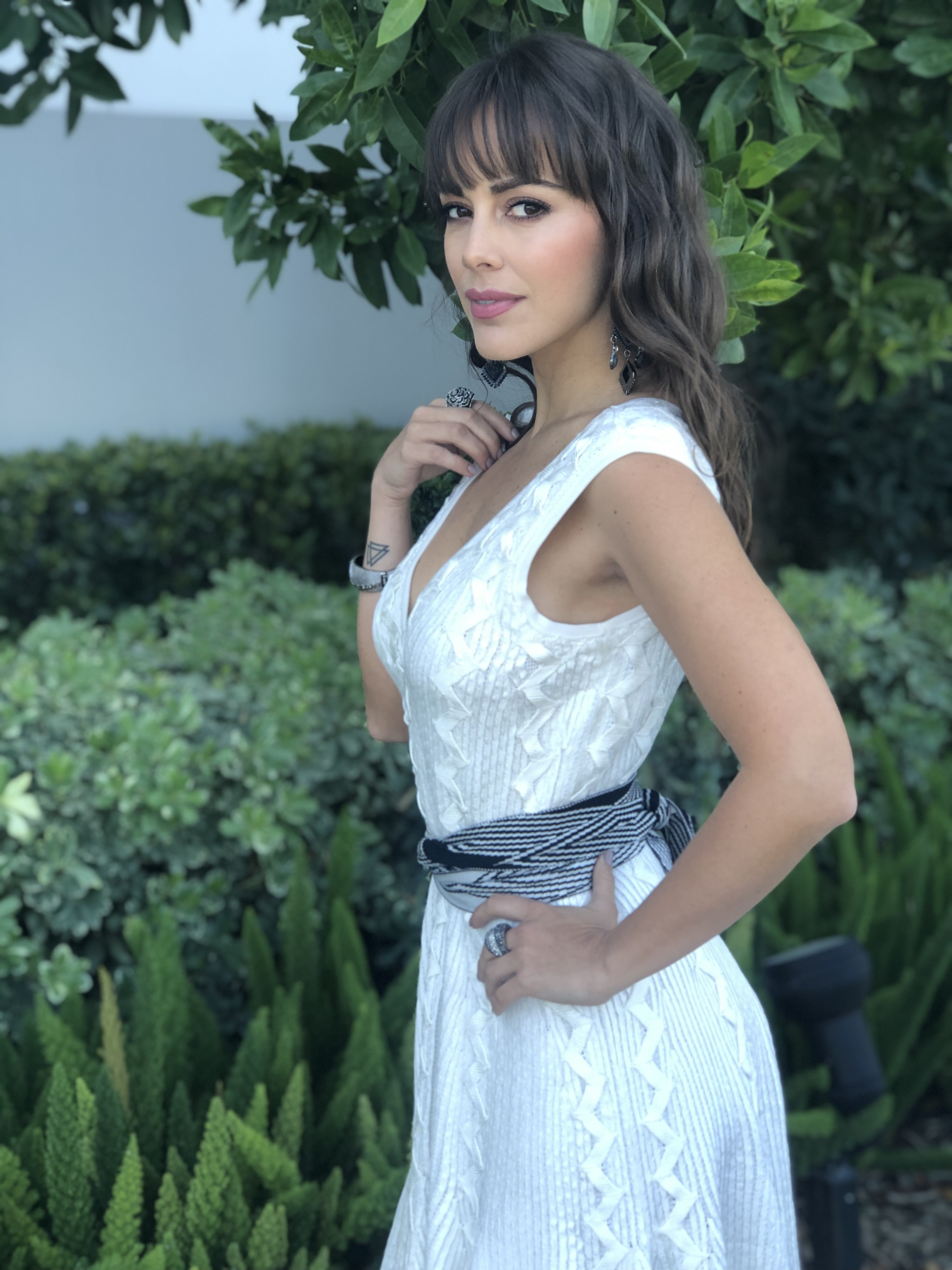
- Camargo in 2019
- Born: María Elisa Camargo Ardila; 21 December 1985 (age 40); Guayaquil, Ecuador
- Occupations: Actress; singer; model
- Years active: 2006–present
- Height: 1.68 m (5 ft 6 in)

María Elisa Camargo Ardila (Spanish pronunciation: [maˈɾi.a eˈlisa kaˈmaɾɣo]; born 21 December 1985) is an Ecuadorian actress and activist. She started out as a contestant on The X Factor Colombia. She began appearing in musical telenovelas after studying theatre as a child. Her first leading part in a film, Maria Alegria in Mark of Desire (Telefutura/Univision), resulted from this.

Camargo's international acting career took off when she relocated to Mexico; she landed numerous villain roles in Televisa's primetime programs. She received an invitation to compete as a star in Univision's Mira Quien Baila and was named one of the "50 Most Beautiful" by People en Español.

She was hired by Telemundo to be their primetime star, and her show broke all previous records for the network, defeating Univision. With Ozuna as her co-star in the Dominican film Los Leones, Camargo's career has transitioned to the silver screen. She later moved to Los Angeles and received her first American acting opportunity as a guest actor for Cinemax's Warrior. She also acted in the Dominican film Infatuation.

She played the character of Patricia Teheran in the Colombian telenovela Tarde lo conocí. She also appeared in Bajo el mismo cielo (as Adela Morales, the star in the series). She starred in Telemundo's hit show En otra piel as a double character: Mónica Serrano and Adriana Aguilar. Her last participation with Telemundo was on the series El Barón, where she starred as Isabel.

== Career ==
Camargo tried out for Colombia's version of The X Factor, El factor X in 2005. Under Jose Gaviria's direction, she entered the main program after several months of bootcamp and auditions. She played music by Shakira, David Bisbal, and Lara Fabian.

Following El Factor X, Camargo made appearances on a number of RCN shows before being cast as Natalia in the telenovela Floricienta. She was later cast as Mary Joy in the telenovela La Marca del Deseo (The Mark of Desire), starring Stephanie Cayo and Alfonso Baptista. The series, produced by RCN for Univision, was her debut appearance on American television.

Alongside Dulce María, she took part in the 2009 version of Verano del '98 (Endless Summer), titled Verano de amor (Summer of Love), in which she portrayed Isabella Roca, the antagonist of the narrative. In the film Hasta Que el Dinero Nos Separe (For Love or Money), she also portrayed Monica Ledesma.

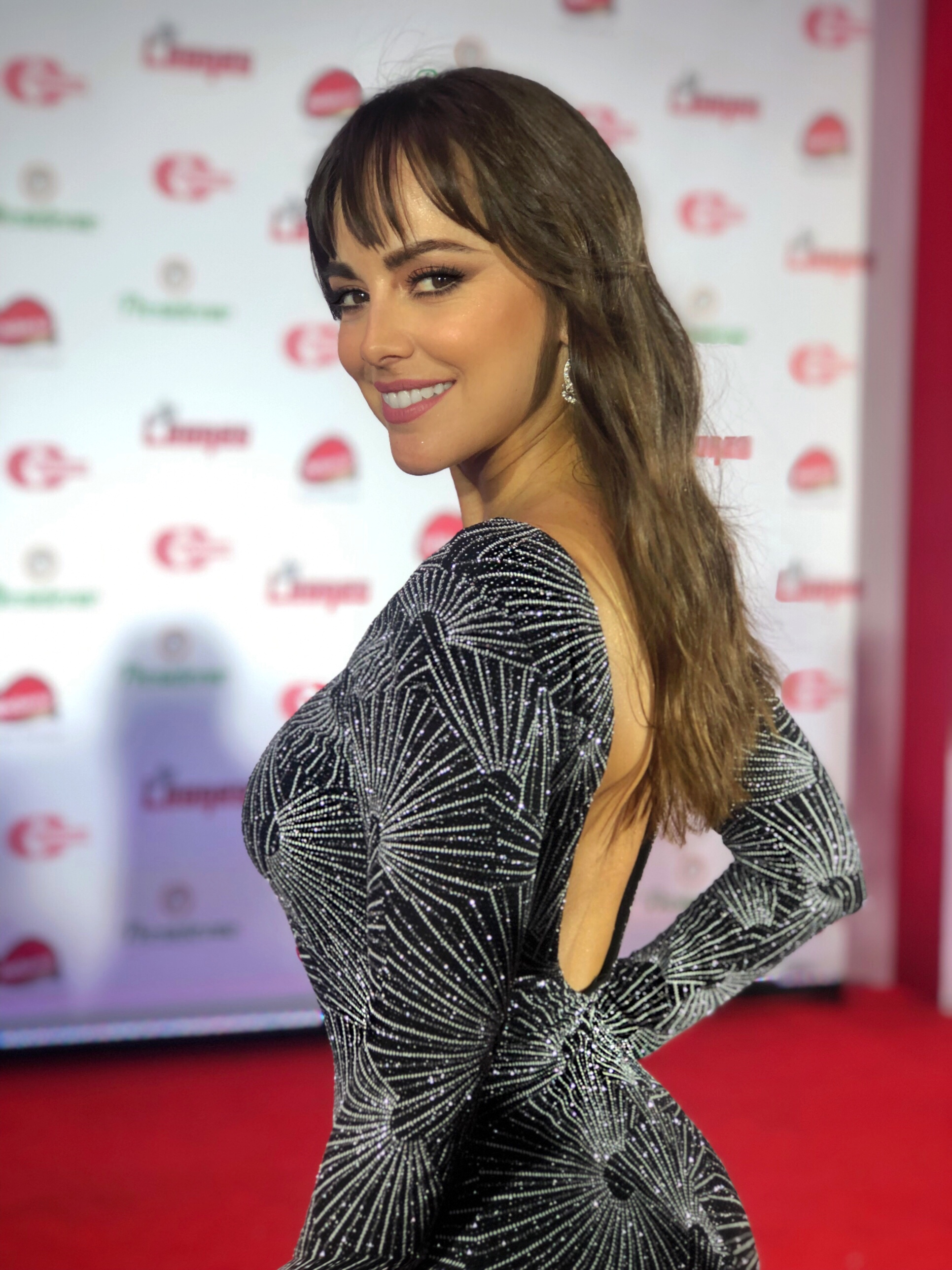
Maria Elisa Camargo during premiere of Los Leones in 2019.

She played Kristel Ruiz y de Teresa Curiel, one of the antagonists in the 2010 telenovela Llena de Amor (Filled With Love), alongside Altair Jarabo and Azela Robinson. She played Patricia "Patricia Zorrilla" in the 2013 film Porque el Amor Manda (Because Love rules).

She co-starred with Gregorio Pernia, Carolina Gaitán, Geraldine Zivic, Pedro Palacio, Indhira Serrano, Roberto Manrique, Norkys Batista in the Telemundo serial Flor Salvaje (Wild Flower) in 2011.

In 2013, she portrayed Natalie in Beto Gomez-directed Mexican film Flying Low.

She co-starred in the 2014 Telemundo telenovela En Otra Piel (Part of Me) as the protagonist alongside David Chocarro, Jorge Luis Pila, Vanessa Villela and Laura Flores. She was cast as the lead in Bajo el mismo cielo (Under the Same Sky), a Telemundo telenovela that also starred Gabriel Porras, Erika de la Rosa, Luis Ernesto Franco and Julio Bracho, in the 2015–2016 season.

She starred in the Telemundo telenovela Bajo el Mismo Cielo from 2015 to 2016, which set a record for Telemundo by outperforming Univisión in the 9 pm primetime slot.

She sang live vocals while portraying the vallenato legend Patricia Teheran in the 2017 Caracol bio-series Tarde Lo Conoc. She appeared alongside Roberto Manrique in the Ecuadorian film Thin Walls.

In 2018, she starred as Isabel Garcia, the wife of aspiring drug king Nacho Montero, in Telemundo's superseries El Barón. She additionally took part in the HBO Access short film Unimundo.

In 2019, she co-starred as Elvira, a deranged psychologist, in the Caribbean Cinemas/Bou Group film Los Leones, alongside Ozuna and Clarissa Molina. Additionally, she secured her first American role as Marisol Rooker in a guest appearance on the HBO/Cinemax series Warrior.

She portrayed Valeria Garza, also known as "El Sin Nombre", in the 2022 video game Call of Duty: Modern Warfare II. Her character is a Mexican drug lord and the head of the Las Almas Cartel doing business with Iranian terrorists.

== Filmography ==
Film roles
Year	Title	Roles	Notes
2014	Volando bajo	Natalie Johnson	
2016	Traslúcido	Celeste	
2018	Unimundo 45	María Alejandra	Short film
2019	Los Leones	Elvira	
2025	Off the Grid	Josey	

Television roles
Year	Title	Roles	Notes
2006	Floricienta	Natalia	
2007–2008	La marca del deseo	María Alegria	Main role; 123 episodes
2009	Verano de amor	Isabela Roca	Main role; 120 episodes
2009–2010	Hasta que el dinero nos separe	Mónica Ledesma	Recurring role; 25 episodes
2010–2011	Llena de amor	Kristel Ruiz y de Teresa Curiel	
2011–2012	Flor Salvaje	Catalina Larrazabal de Urrieta	
2012–2013	Porque el amor manda	Patricia Zorrilla	Main role; 182 episodes
2014	En otra piel	Mónica Serrano / Mónica Arriaga / Adriana Aguilar	Main role; 154 episodes
2015–2016	Bajo el mismo cielo	Adela Morales	Main role; 122 episodes
2017–2018	Tarde lo conocí	Patricia Teherán	Main role; 105 episodes
2019	El Barón	Isabel García	Main role; 58 episodes
2020	Warrior	Marisol Rooker	Guest Star
2023	Juego de mentiras	Adriana Molina	Main role
2024	Escupiré sobre sus tumbas	Katherine Obregón	Main role

Video games
Year	Title	Roles	Notes
2022	Call of Duty: Modern Warfare II	Valeria Garza	Facial, motion capture & voice acting
2023	Call of Duty: Warzone 2.0	Valeria Garza	Playable character, facial, motion capture & voice acting
2026	Call of Duty: Modern Warfare 4	Valeria Garza	Facial, motion capture & voice acting

== Discography ==
Singles
Year	Single	Notes
2007	"Dígale"	
2007	"Otro Amor Vendrá"	
2007	"Las Marías"	Music of the soap opera La marca del deseo
2007	"Ay amor"	
2007	"Tengo una pena"	
2007	"Por ti"	

== Awards and nominations ==
Year	Award	Category	Nominated work	Result
2014	Premios Tu Mundo			
2014	Premios Tu Mundo	Favorite protagonist	En otra piel	Nominated
2014	Premios Tu Mundo	Soy Sexy and I know it	Herself	Nominated

=== Accolades ===
Year	Accolade	Category
2014	People en Español	
2014	People en Español	Los 50 Más Bellos del 2014 de la revista People en Español
