= Brothers Under Fire =

- Release poster
- Directed by: Justin Chadwick
- Written by: Delbert Hancock; Ian Mackenzie Jeffers
- Produced by: Robert Stein; James Keach; Griff Furst
- Starring: Kiefer Sutherland
- Cinematography: Toby Elwes
- Edited by: Joshua Chadwick
- Production companies: Curmudgeon Films; Align; Highland Film Group
- Distributed by: Vertical
- Release date: April 17, 2026
- Running time: 101 minutes
- Country: United States
- Language: English

Brothers Under Fire is a 2026 American action film written by Delbert Hancock and Ian Mackenzie Jeffers, directed by Justin Chadwick and starring Kiefer Sutherland as Captain Jordan Wright.

== Plot ==
Captain Jordan Wright (Kiefer Sutherland) is a decorated and highly skilled U.S. Army officer, renowned for leading dangerous operations in conflict zones such as Syria.

Though respected for his tactical competence, Wright's domineering approach often strains his relationships with fellow soldiers. During one overseas mission, he is struck by a bullet and, unable to evacuate in time before an airstrike, suffers partial hearing loss as a result.

Following the successful completion of their mission, Wright and his team — gunner-medic Alberto, Danny (Solly McLeod), Hino, and Carson — celebrate back at base. When Alberto is granted U.S. citizenship by Colonel Wood, he invites the entire squad to his wedding in Mexico, where his fiancée Isabella (Laura Osma) awaits. Wright agrees to attend and serves as best man.

Upon arriving in Mexico, the soldiers are welcomed into Alberto's family home. However, Alberto quietly notices a simmering tension between his brother Miguel and the rest of the family. The source of this unease runs deeper than domestic friction: the family's land is held under a landlord named Moreno, who has long pressured tenant farmers for mounting payments, forcing Alberto's parents to sell their crops simply to meet his demands.

Moreno himself has become a target of the local cartel, led by a ruthless and calculating crime boss named Baker (Omar Chaparro). Baker covets the lands registered in Moreno's name and, after a botched assassination attempt by his men, takes matters into his own hands — rounding up Moreno's workers, extracting Moreno's location from a laborer named Valdemar at gunpoint, and ordering Moreno's execution.

The wedding celebration at a local eatery is shattered by the arrival of Stevie, Baker's volatile and entitled younger brother, who intrudes upon the party after noticing the women inside. Stevie — reckless, aggressive, and accustomed to operating without consequences — picks a fight with Danny after a trivial physical altercation near the entrance.

When Alberto steps in to defuse the situation, Stevie interprets the intervention as a betrayal, viewing Alberto as siding with the American outsiders. Stevie shoots Alberto, resulting in Wright shooting Stevie in retaliation, while Hino wounds Stevie's associate Paco in the chaos.

Despite the squad's efforts to save his life, Alberto bleeds out and dies, leaving Isabella and his family devastated. In the immediate aftermath, Alberto's grieving father urges Miguel to guide Jordan and the remaining soldiers out of Mexico as quickly as possible.

He reasons that Paco is still alive and will return to the cartel with a full account of what happened. Alberto's father wants no further bloodshed on his land. Wright initially agrees, recognizing that U.S. military jurisdiction does not extend to Mexican soil and that any further confrontation carries grave consequences. But Wright cannot accept the suffering of Alberto's family, and turns his squad back.

The squad tracks Paco, knowing that Lino's wound means he cannot have gone far. They find Paco's body shortly before a cartel vehicle approaches from the mountain road. Wright stages an ambush, positioning Carson and Hino behind their truck while he and the injured Danny stall the arriving men.

At Wright's signal, the team launches a coordinated attack, killing two of Baker's men before retreating. Danny is shot in the stomach during the skirmish, though manages to survive.

Back at Baker's operation, the cartel boss has grown increasingly anxious over his brother Stevie's unexplained absence. The surviving gunman from the ambush returns to Baker and reports everything about Wright and his men. Baker mobilizes his forces and moves on the town. The squad, now sheltering inside a local school with Miguel's help, prepares for the confrontation.

Carson takes a sniper position in a clock tower while Danny and Hino lay down cover fire. The battle is brutal and costly — Baker's men eventually kill both Carson and Hino.

Wright and Danny kill more of Baker's henchmen and Wright faces Baker. He gets shot in the neck but manages to kill Baker for good, he collapes afterwards but survives; he and Danny are recovered and rescued, and are the only two survivors of the final confrontation.

Wright and Danny then meet Isabella at a graveyard and a photo of the team is seen.

== Cast ==
- Kiefer Sutherland as Capt. Jordan Wright
- Omar Chaparro as Baker
- Laura Osma as Isabella Perez
- Tommy Martinez as Alberto Castillo
- Solly McLeod as Danny Walton
- Orlando Pineda as Miguel
- Laird Akeo as Marco Hino
- Ashton Sanders as Lieutenant Carson
- Diego Vásquez as Fernando
- Flora Martinez as Angelica
- Sebastian Sierra as Belisario
- Cristal Aparicio as Violeta
- Gabriel Camero as Stevie
- Konnier Mosquera as Valdemar
- Mateo Merchan as Paco
- Yuli Pedraza as Maria
- Camil Colmenares as Jorge
- David Sanchez as Tomas
- Mario Ruiz as Dr. Ferrau
- Enzo Morales as Tio
- Freddy Yate as Octavio
- Tatiana Arias as Marisa
- Juan Pablo Solano as Moreno
- Sebastián Eslava as Arturo
- Manuel Santiago Arango as Edo
- Griff Furst as Colonel Wood
- James Keach as Moncrief

== Production ==
In November 2024, it was announced that production on the film began in Colombia. It was also announced that same month that Ashton Sanders, Laura Osma, Solly McLeod, and Omar Chaparro were also cast in the film.

== Release ==
In March 2026, it was announced that the title of Sierra Madre was updated to Brothers Under Fire. The film received a simultaneous limited theatrical release and digital release by Vertical on April 17, 2026.
