= El Comandante (TV series) =

Colombian biographical TV series (2017)

- Genre: Telenovela
- Written by: José Luis González; Juan Andrés Granados; Versalia Cordero
- Story by: Moisés Naím
- Directed by: Felipe Cano; Henry Rivero
- Starring: Andrés Parra; Gabriela Vergara
- Opening theme: "Vida sagrada" by Fonseca
- Country of origin: Colombia
- Original language: Spanish
- No. of seasons: 1
- No. of episodes: 102

Production
- Executive producers: Andrea Marulanda; Luis Eduardo Jiménez
- Production company: Sony Pictures Television

Original release
- Network: RCN Televisión
- Release: January 30 – July 7, 2017

El Comandante (lit. 'The Commander', Spanish: [el ko.mãn̪ˈd̪ãn̪.t̪e]) is a Colombian television series created by Sony Pictures Television. It is based on the life of the late Venezuelan President Hugo Rafael Chávez Frias. It stars Andrés Parra as the titular character.

== Plot summary ==
El Comandante is a story inspired by the life of Hugo Chávez, a man of humble origin who, at only 44 years old and against all odds, became the most powerful and controversial Latin American leader of his time. During his rule he controlled at will the largest oil reserves on the planet, challenged the First World and managed to shake the continent as nobody else.

The production narrates the fictional story of a man and a country, inspired by real events, incorporating elements and characters of fiction as his comrades fighting, the spies who wanted to kill him, the women who accompanied him in his career and the members of the opposition, to offer an account of suspense and action, of politics and romance.

== Cast ==
- Andrés Parra as Hugo Rafael Chávez Frias
- Gabriela Vergara as Marisabel Rodríguez de Chávez
- Stephanie Cayo as Mónica Zabaleta
- Julián Román as Carlos Uzcátegui
- César Manzano as Manuel Centeno
- Sheila Monterola as Antonia Salcedo
- Jimmy Vásquez as Willy Manzanares
- Albi De Abreu as Cristóbal Iturbe
- Marianela González as Daniela Vásquez
- Paulina Dávila as Isabel Manrique
- Natalia Reyes as Carolina Jiménez
- Vicente Peña as Ángel Saavedra
- José Narváez as Iván Fonseca
- Viña Machado as Carmen Rondón
- Jorge Rengifo as Yuckson
- Duban Prado as Máikel
- Jeanette Lehr as Adelaida de Chávez "Mamá Laida"
- Jimmy Vásquez as Willy Manzanares
- Francisco Denis as Fernando Brizuela
- Franártur Duque as Ángel Saavedra, young

== Production ==
The production is based on an original idea by the Venezuelan writer and columnist Moisés Naím and the direction is by Felipe Cano (Lady, la vendedora de rosas, El laberinto de Alicia) and Henry Rivero (film En coma). The librettos are by José Luis González, Juan Andrés Granados and Versalia Cordero. The series is produced by Andrea Marulanda and Luis Eduardo Jiménez as executive producers, series production is scheduled for the summer of 2016.

The first advance of the series was revealed on October 25, 2016, showing scenes that marked the life of the Venezuelan president, such as episodes of his childhood in Sabaneta, Barinas state, until the coup attempt he led in 1992.

=== Casting ===
In May 2016, Andrés Parra published in his Twitter account a promotional image of the series next to the phrase "The power of passion and the passion for power". To interpret Chavez, Parra had to practice the Venezuelan accent, and cut his hair to interpret the stage where Chavez suffered from cancer. For the personage of Marisabel Rodríguez de Chávez several Venezuelan actresses made casting such as Wanda D'Isidoro, Eileen Abad, Gaby Spanic and Sonya Smith, later she was chosen Gabriela Vergara to interpret the character. More than 50% of the cast are Venezuelan actors.

== Reception ==
Following heavy promotion of the series in Colombia, The Miami Herald described El Comandante's launch as being "in a lackluster sixth place, behind the telenovela Sin Tetas No Hay Paraiso as well as Colombia's Next Top Model and NBC’s Las Vega's".

=== Controversy ===
In May 2016, Diosdado Cabello was completely opposed to the production of the series, because he would only lend to defaming the former president of Venezuela, thus asking the executives of Sony Pictures Television to stop the production process and show evidence that the Chavez family agreed with such a series. Later, Sony Pictures Television clarified that Asdrúbal Chávez had authorized the production of the series. Actress Gabriela Vergara received several negative comments towards her character in the series, because Marisabel Rodríguez de Chávez is accused of complicity and robbery during the Chávez government. In October 2016, Cabello warned to take legal action against the production company Sony Pictures Television to continue with the production of the series.

Screenwriter Moisés Naím clarified that the series is a series of fiction and not a biography so it will have nothing to do with the reality of Venezuela.

In Venezuela, CONATEL, an institution that regulates airing and broadcasting in the country, ordered to withdraw the signal from RCN Television to prohibit the viewing of the series.

== Broadcast ==
The series was released on January 30, 2017 in Colombia on RCN Televisión, while in Latin America it premiered on January 31, 2017 on TNT. In the United States, it will be transmitted by the network Telemundo.
