= Tarde lo conocí =

- Genre: Telenovela
- Written by: Juana Uribe; Paola Arias; Adriana Arango; Catalina Palomino
- Directed by: Klych López
- Starring: María Elisa Camargo; Roberto Urbina; Javier Jattin
- Opening theme: "Tarde lo conocí" by María Elisa Camargo
- Composer: Omar Geles
- Country of origin: Colombia
- Original language: Spanish
- No. of seasons: 1
- No. of episodes: 105

Production
- Executive producer: Ana Piñeres
- Producer: Clara María Ochoa
- Camera setup: Multi-camera
- Production company: CMO Producciones

Original release
- Network: Caracol Televisión
- Release: 12 September 2017 – 23 February 2018

Related
- Los Morales; La mamá del 10

Tarde lo conocí (stylized as Tarde lo conocí, cuando las mujeres callaban, ella cantó), is a Colombian biographical television series produced by CMO Producciones for Caracol Televisión. Based on the life of the composer and singer Patricia Teherán. It stars María Elisa Camargo in the main role.

== Plot ==
It is based on the life of Patricia Teherán (María Elisa Camargo) who because of her taste for music vallenata decided to dedicate her life to make her way in this world using as tools her optimism, joy, sympathy and desire to get her family from the harsh economic conditions for that they crossed; but because this world was considered exclusive for men, Patricia had to face many adversities to achieve her goal. Throughout her career as a singer, this woman meets a man named Ricardo Cabello (Roberto Urbina) with whom he maintains a loving relationship, not knowing that he was committed to Sonia Maestre and after learning of this disastrous news Patricia looks for a way to convey her feelings to through its interpretation; thanks to the help given by Héctor Méndez (Javier Jattin); who after having met her fell in love with her and after learning what Ricardo did, he does everything possible to keep her away from him, becoming his unconditional company at all times of his life.

== Cast ==
=== Main ===
- María Elisa Camargo as Patricia Teherán
- Roberto Urbina as Ricardo Cabello
- Javier Jattin as Héctor Méndez
- Luna Baxter as Sonia Maestre
- Víctor Hugo Trespalacios as Juancho Teherán
- Jacqueline Arenal as Margot Romero
- Mimi Anaya as Caya Quiros
- Gianina Arana as Ingrid Cubides
- Sharlyn Bayter as Matilde
- Megumi Hasebe as Yulitza
- Constanza Duque as Cate
- Marcela Agudelo as Pau
- Carlos Serrato as Remberto Infante
- Laura Ramos as Estrella
- Brenda Hanst as Francisca
- Juan Pablo Franco as Emiliano Maestre
- Jacques Tourhmanian as Jair Villanueva
- Federico Rivera as Orlando
- Pedro Palacio as César
- Andrés Ruiz as Mauricio Cabello
- Alberoni Cortés as Kike
- Jeferson Medina as Alejo
- Juan Diego Sánchez as Cabeto
- Rafael Santos Díaz as El Cacique

== Ratings ==
Viewership and ratings per season of Tarde lo conocí
Season	Episodes	First aired		Last aired		Avg. viewers (millions)	18–49 rank
Season	Episodes	Date	Viewers (millions)	Date	Viewers (millions)	Avg. viewers (millions)	18–49 rank
1	105	12 September 2017	13.5	23 February 2018	16.7	TBD	TBD

== Awards and nominations ==
Year	Award	Category	Nominated	Result
2018	34th India Catalina Awards	Best Edition of Telenovela or Series	Tarde lo conocí	Nominated
