= La esquina del diablo =

- Created by: Covadonga Espeso; Jordi Arencón
- Starring: Ana Serradilla; Miguel de Miguel; Gregorio Pernía
- Theme music composer: José Carlos María; Oliver Camargo
- Opening theme: "La esquina del diablo"
- Country of origin: Colombia
- Original language: Spanish
- No. of seasons: 1
- No. of episodes: 70

Production
- Producer: Bruno James
- Running time: 42-45 minutes
- Production company: RCN

Original release
- Network: UniMás
- Release: January 13 – April 26, 2015

La esquina del diablo (English: Devil's Corner) is a Colombian telenovela produced by RCN and RTI Producciones for UniMás. Ana Serradilla and Miguel de Miguel star as the protagonists, while Gregorio Pernía and Christian Tappan star as the antagonists.

== Cast ==
- Ana Serradilla as Ana García
- Miguel de Miguel as Eder Martín
- Gregorio Pernía as Yago
- Christian Tappan as Angel Velasco
- Quique Mendoza as Seisdedos
- Julián Caicedo as Cachalote
- Ernesto Ballén as Bateador
- Juan Carlos Messier as Daniel
- Antonio Jiménez as Andrade
- Juán Pablo Gamboa as Alcalde Gómez
- Ariel Díaz as Sánchez
