= Mauricio Vidal =

Colombian cinematographer

- Occupation: Cinematographer
- Notable work: Narcos
- Website: mauriciovidal.net

Mauricio Vidal is a Colombian cinematographer.

== Early life and educaiton ==
Mauricio Vidal studied social media at the university in Bogotá.

== Career ==
Vidal's first work in film was as an editor on a documentary travel show. His influences include cinematographers such as Darius Khondji and Seamus McGarvey.

He worked as a 2nd unit cinematographer on Narcos Season 1, which was filmed in Colombia. Vidal used the Red Epic camera and Zeiss Ultra Prime lenses for the series. His role as a camera operator on Tom Clancy's Jack Ryan provided him with experience in managing high-pressure situations and complex logistics.

In 2024–2025 Vidal was DOP for the British-French drama thriller film made by David Cummings and Eric Cummings, Legionario, which was filmed in France and Colombia. The film had its world premiere at the Festival Internacional de Cine de Villavicencio CRISOL in Villavicencio, Colombia, on 6 November 2025.

== Filmography ==
List of Mauricio Vidal's film credits
Year	Film	Notes and references
2007	Satanás	
2009	Undertow	Nominated for Best cinematography in 1st Macondo Awards
2014	Monte Adentro	Special Mention at the 22nd Camerimage
2014	The Vanished Elephant	Feature narrative
2015 – 2017	Narcos	2nd unit cinematographer - Season 1
2018	La mujer de los siete nombres	Nominated for Best cinematography in 8th Macondo Awards
2018 – 2023	Jack Ryan	Camera operator
2020	The Best Families	
2022	Rebellion	Nominated for Best cinematography in 11th Macondo Awards
2023	Ana Rosa	
2023	Afwaah	
2025	Legionario	
