= The Best Families =

Las mejores familias
- Theatrical release poster
- Spanish: Las mejores familias
- Directed by: Javier Fuentes-León
- Written by: Javier Fuentes-León
- Produced by: Javier Fuentes-León; Delia García
- Starring: Tatiana Astengo; Gabriela Velásquez
- Cinematography: Mauricio Vidal
- Edited by: Javier Becerra Heraud
- Music by: Selma Mutal
- Production companies: El Calvo Films; Dynamo Producciones
- Release dates: October 2020 (Rome Film Fest) & (BIFF); 26 August 2021 (Colombia); 4 November 2021 (Peru)
- Running time: 99 minutes
- Countries: Peru; Colombia
- Language: Spanish

The Best Families (Spanish: Las mejores familias) is a 2020 black comedy-drama film written and directed by Javier Fuentes-León. Starring Tatiana Astengo, Giovanni Ciccia, Jely Reátegui, Grapa Paola, Carlos Carlín, Jimena Lindo, César Ritter, Marco Zunino and Vanessa Saba.

== Synopsis ==
Luzmila and Peta are two sisters who work as maids for Alicia and Carmen, two lady aristocrats from Peru. They are considered part of the family or, at least, that is what it seems. But one day, while the city is taken over by violent protests, a birthday celebration brings together all the members of the families. A secret long kept by both families is revealed, thus bursting the bubble of their perfect aristocratic world forever.

== Cast ==
- Tatiana Astengo as Luzmila
- Gabriela Velasquez as Peta
- Grapa Paola as Alicia
- Augusto Mazzarelli as Ferdinand
- Yiliana Chong as Florentyna
- Lizet Chavez as Sandra
- Giovanni Ciccia as Alvaro
- Jely Reategui as Merge
- Vanessa Saba as Carolina
- Gracia Olayo as Carmen
- Marco Zunino as Mariano
- Roberto Cano as Jano

== Release ==
The Best Families premiered in mid-October 2020 at the 15th Rome International Film Festival as part of the Official Competition and as an Official Selection at the 25th Busan International Film Festival. It premiered in Colombian theaters on August 26, 2021, and on November 4, 2021, in Peruvian theaters.

== Awards ==
- Winner of the Jury Special Mention award at the 21st edition of the Havana New York Film Festival.
- Official selection to compete for the Ariel Award and Goya Awards.
