= Paola Baldion =

Colombian actress

- Born: Paris, France
- Occupation: Actress
- Years active: 2010–present
- Notable work: Portraits in a sea of lies

Paola Baldión is a Colombian actress, known for her starring role in Portraits in a sea of lies. She is the only daughter of Raúl Baldión and Claudia Fischer.

== Early years ==
Baldión was born in Paris and lived there until she was three years old. Her passion for acting began at an early age, participating in her parents' puppet theater company in Florence, Italy. At the age of ten, Paola and her parents moved to Colombia, where she studied theater for three years with Edgardo Román and Paco Barrero. At that time, when she was seventeen, she secured her first audition for Amor a thousand, a Colombian soap opera that lasted almost two years. This opened the doors and began working on other television series such as This is the life and stories of men only for women.

She also appeared in commercials for Telecom and Antipiratería, and in short films such as Trip to the Messiah of Felipe Paz.

She moved to New York at twenty and studied acting at HB Studio for two years. While studying, she shot short films with a group of friends. In the summer of 2003, she worked in a Bollywood production called Kal Ho Naa Ho, in which she performed the role of a salsa dancer. At that time, she moved to Montreal where she graduated in Theater and Film Studies at the Concordia University.

== Professional life ==
Baldión's professional career began on Colombian television with the television series "Love A thousand", directed by Harold Trompetero and starring Manolo Cardona and Patricia Vásquez.

Her first feature film as an actress was "Portraits in a sea of lies" (2010), the first film by director Carlos Gaviria, for which she won the best actress award at the Amiens (France), Guadalajara (Mexico) and the Colombian Academy award: Macondo Award.

In 2017, Paola took a DNA test, and based on her genealogical responses, she created the video #IAmMigration to humanize immigrants and the immigration process. The video went viral, garnering 17 million views in its first week. This caught the attention of various DNA companies, which ultimately funded her first feature documentary as director and producer, I Am Migration.

In 2019, Paola premiered I Am Migration, a documentary that explores the personal and emotional impact of migration. The film delves into the lives of immigrants, showcasing their struggles, resilience, and the complex journey they undertake in search of a better future. Through a deeply human lens, the documentary aims to challenge misconceptions and provoke empathy towards the immigrant experience.

In 2020, she worked on the movie "Lady Of Guadalupe", a project directed by Pedro Brenner, and "Love Doll", a film directed by Michael Flores.

As a film producer at Dos Almas Films, Paola has directed several short films and the docuseries For Alma released in 2020. Her latest work, Abrazo, is a fiction short film about the journey of an undocumented pregnant Central American woman crossing the U.S.-Mexico border. The film has won 29 awards, including Best Director, Best Screenplay, and Best Actress for Paola Baldion. Abrazo had its world premiere on April 4, 2025.

"

== Filmography ==
=== Film ===
Year	Film	Role	Notes
2007	Looking for Miguel	Maria	
2010	Portraits in a Sea of Lies	Maria	
2012	Electrick Children	Lola	
2012	California in Color	Vickie	
2012	No Autumn, No Spring	Gloria	
2013	The Liberation of James Joyce	Clarie	
2014	The Naked Screen	Esperanza	
2014	Drakken	Ziusudra	
2017	Nobody's Watching	Viviana	
2018	La Palabra de Pablo	Laura Blanco	
2019	The Long Home	Rosie	
2020	Lady of Guadalupe	Lady of Guadalupe	
2022	Love Doll	Carmina	
2023	Hilo Del Retorno	Marina	
2025	Abrazo	Luz	

== Television ==
Year	Film	Role	Notes
2001	Amor a Mil	Tatiana	
2001	Love a thousand		
