= Gabriel's Passion =

- Original film poster for "La Pasión de Gabriel"
- Directed by: Luis Alberto Restrepo
- Written by: Diego Vásquez
- Starring: Andrés Parra, María Cecilia Sánchez
- Cinematography: Sergio García
- Music by: Sally Station
- Release date: 25 December 2009
- Running time: 89 minutes
- Country: Colombia
- Language: Spanish

Gabriel's Passion (Spanish: La Pasión de Gabriel) is a Colombian feature film released in August 2009 directed by Luis Alberto Restrepo and starring Andrés Parra. It is the story of a passionate young priest, portrayed by Parra, who is assigned to a village in the mountains of Colombia's coffee region during the Colombian conflict.

== Plot ==
The film is set during the Colombian conflict. Father Gabriel is a stout and good-natured young priest in a town in the mountains of Colombia's coffee region. Unable to control his passions, Gabriel has a sexual affair with a woman from his parish. He also confronts the violent groups in his town. He has an internal debate between following the orders of the diocese or leaving the priesthood to help his community without the security of the cassock.

The film's other fundamental characters are the school principal and her husband who are described as "masters of empathy."

The film's website noted: "The film demonstrates how fact is stranger than fiction and how ordinary men can be heroes too. Gabriel's Passion questions the vow of chastity and reflects on the human weaknesses of priests. It also reveals how Christian salvation cannot occur without social and ideological liberation, as visible signs of human dignity."

== Production ==
The production was filmed in the mountains of Santuario and Pereira in the Colombian department of Risaralda.

The film starred Andrés Parra who gained fame three years later for his role as Pablo Escobar in the Colombian television series, Pablo Escobar, The Drug Lord.

The production credits include the following:

- Luis Alberto Restrepo - director and screenplay
- Alberto Amaya - producer
- Sergio Garcia - editor
- Sergio Garcia Moreno - cinematographer, director of photograph
- Pierre Heron - editor
- Carlos Rios - art director
- Diego Vásquez - screenplay

The film's duration is 86 minutes.

== Cast ==
- Andrés Parra, as Father Gabriel
- María Cecilia Sánchez, as Silvia
- Jorge Rodríguez, as Alcides
- Isabel Gaona, as Roaario
- Diego Vásquez, as Profe Luna

== Reception and awards ==
In its first month in Colombian movie theaters, the film was seen by 176,510 viewers, making it one of the most viewed Colombian films of 2009.

At the 2009 Guadalajara Film Festival, Andrés Parra won the Mayahuel de Plata award as best actor. The film was also invited to film festivals in Warsaw and Medellin.

In a review in El Epectador, Enrique Posada called it a "beautiful film" and described its protagonist as "one of those guys, deeply committed to life, living every moment to the full. He is a tall, stout, good-natured man who enjoys the air and the water, daring, brave." Posada wrote that the opening sequence, a baptism scene in a mountain stream, is "truly poetic."

In 2016, film critic Jeronimo Rivera-Betancur of El Tiempo rated the film at No. 21 in his list of his favorite Colombian fiction films.
