= Crab Trap =

2009 Colombian-French film

Crab Trap (Spanish: Trampa de cangrejo) (French: Piège à crabe)
- Film poster
- Directed by: Oscar Ruiz Navia
- Written by: Oscar Ruiz Navia
- Produced by: Guillaume de Seille
- Starring: Arnobio Salazar Rivas; Rodrigo Vélez
- Edited by: Felipe Guerrero
- Release date: 12 March 2009
- Running time: 95 minutes
- Countries: Colombia; France
- Language: Spanish

Crab Trap (Spanish: El vuelco del cangrejo) is a 2009 Colombian-French drama film directed by Oscar Ruiz Navia. The film was selected as the Colombian entry for the Best Foreign Language Film at the 83rd Academy Awards, but it did not make the final shortlist.

== Plot ==
Daniel arrives in the Afro-Colombian community of La Barra on Colombia's Pacific coast, looking for a boat to leave the country. He intends to stay for only a few days, but a strange shortage of fish has affected La Barra and the fishermen have been sailing far out to sea in hopes of finding better catch. These circumstances make Daniel's search more difficult. In the meantime, the villagers have their own issues: Cerebro, the leader of the community, is trying to adjust to the advent of modernity.

== Cast ==
- Arnobio Salazar Rivas as Cerebro
- Rodrigo Vélez as Daniel

== See also ==
- List of submissions to the 83rd Academy Awards for Best Foreign Language Film
- List of Colombian submissions for the Academy Award for Best Foreign Language Film
