= Undertow (2009 film) =

2009 film

- Theatrical release poster
- Directed by: Javier Fuentes-León
- Written by: Javier Fuentes-León
- Produced by: Javier Fuentes-León
- Starring: Cristian Mercado; Manolo Cardona; Tatiana Astengo
- Cinematography: Mauricio Vidal
- Edited by: Roberto Benavides
- Music by: Selma Mutal
- Release dates: 23 September 2009 (Zinemaldia); 16 April 2010 (Colombia); 26 August 2010 (Peru)
- Running time: 100 minutes
- Countries: Peru; Colombia; France; Germany
- Language: Spanish
- Box office: $501,256

Undertow (Spanish: Contracorriente) is a 2009 fantasy romantic drama film directed, written and produced by Javier Fuentes-León in his directorial debut. Initial financing came from Germany and France with additional financing from Peru. The film shot in Cabo Blanco, Peru, won the World Cinema Audience Award in the Dramatic category at the 26th Sundance Film Festival. Other Audience Awards included Cartagena, Montreal, Miami, Chicago, Utrecht, Lima, and Galway, as well as Jury Awards in Madrid, San Francisco, Seattle, Toulouse, and Philadelphia. It received a nomination as Best Latin American Film at the 2011 Goya Awards in Spain.

The film was also selected as the Peruvian entry for the Best Foreign Language Film at the 83rd Academy Awards but it did not make the final shortlist.

== Plot ==
Miguel is a young fisherman of Cabo Blanco, a small village in northern Peru with specific traditions regarding death. He is married to Mariela, who's pregnant with their first son, but he also has a secret affair with a male painter called Santiago who he meets for trysts at a deserted cave on the coast.

Santiago accidentally drowns at sea, and his ghost returns to ask Miguel to find his body, in order to bury it with their village's rituals. Miguel eventually finds Santiago's body in the water, but does not tell his ghost of the discovery. Meanwhile, the villagers discover nude paintings of Miguel at Santiago's house, fueling a rumour that they were having an affair. Mariela hears the rumours, confronts Miguel about them, and upon hearing him confess, she goes to her mother's house with their newborn child.

Miguel returns to look for Santiago's body, but he finds that the current has taken it away. Mariela eventually returns home, but then Santiago's body appears in the nets of a fishing boat. Miguel claims Santiago's body for a burial at sea as his lover wanted. He takes the shrouded body of Santiago to sea, but a second after the body is committed to the waves, the ghost of Santiago reappears for a last time, caressing Miguel, who returns home alone in the sundown.

== Cast ==
- Cristian Mercado as Miguel
- Manolo Cardona as Santiago
- Tatiana Astengo as Mariela

== Production ==
Undertow had been gestating since 1996, when the director Javier Fuentes-León wrote the very first scene. Originally conceived as a supernatural revenge thriller about a fisherman having an affair with a prostitute, Javier decided to change it after coming out of the closet himself, in an attempt to explore more interesting themes and material.

== Critical reception ==
The film received positive reviews from critics. Review aggregator Rotten Tomatoes reports that 88% out of 32 critics gave the film a positive review, with a rating average of 7.3/10. Manohla Dargis from The New York Times praised the director's ability to show powerful relationships between the characters, particularly focusing on the complexity of Miguel's feelings for Mariela, which she called "gratifying". David Wiegang from the San Francisco Chronicle also gave the film a positive review, saying that the "film's accomplishments are many, but not the least is its ability to take a human story and frame it as a parable, without losing a bit of credibility or irresistible heart."

Pam Grady from Boxoffice Magazine wrote “Sensual and romantic with a heavy dose of the supernatural and populated by indelible characters.” Bob Mondello from NPR wrote “Undertow, for all its narrative tricks, has been given the rhythm and texture of real life, as well as emotional undercurrents that are haunting.”

== Awards and nominations ==
- 2009: Won Sebastian Award at the San Sebastián International Film Festival
- 2010: Won Audience Awards for "World Cinema – Dramatic" category at the Sundance Film Festival
- 2010: Nominated for Grand Jury Prize for "World Cinema – Dramatic" category at the Sundance Film Festival
- 2010: Won Audience Award for Ibero-American competition at Miami Film Festival
- 2010: Nominated for Golden India Catalina for "Best Film (Mejor Película)" at Cartagena Film Festival
- 2011: Nominated GLAAD Media Award for Outstanding Film – Limited Release
- 2011: Nominated for Goya for "Best Spanish Language Foreign Film" at Goya Awards
- 2011: Winner for Best Film at the 6th Luces Awards

== See also ==
- List of submissions to the 83rd Academy Awards for Best Foreign Language Film
- List of Peruvian submissions for the Academy Award for Best Foreign Language Film
- List of lesbian, gay, bisexual, or transgender-related films by storyline
