= Ramses Ramos =

Colombian actor

Ramsés Ramos
- Born: Ramsés Ramoss; 1964 (age 61–62); Cartagena, Colombia
- Occupation: Actor
- Years active: 1995–present
- Works: El día de la suerte, Sin tetas no hay paraíso
- Children: 3

Ramsés Ramos (born 1964) is a Colombian actor.

Born in Cartagena, Colombia, Ramsés studied Law but abandoned it to pursue studies in Dramatic Arts at Escuela de Actores del Teatro Libre.

Ramos is known for his roles in Tiempos Difíciles (1997), Sin tetas no hay paraíso (2006), Yo soy otro (2008) and El Cartel de los Sapos (2008). He also portrayed musician Victor "El Nene" Del Real in El Joe, la leyenda (2011), and journalist Mariano Saucedo in Diomedes, el Cacique de La Junta (2015). Ramos is also known for his acting range, as shown in his portrayal of a Travesti in El día de la suerte (2013). Ramos also recently starred in Hombres de Dios.

In 2020 Ramos worked in El Robo del Siglo.

In 2025, Ramos portrayed Coronel Giraldo in Netflix's Medusa series.

Ramos is separated with three kids.
