= La mamá del 10 =

2018 Colombian telenovela

- Genre: Telenovela
- Directed by: Andres Marroquín
- Starring: Karent Hinestroza; Marcela Benjumea; Diego Vásquez; Antonio Jiménez
- Country of origin: Colombia
- Original language: Spanish
- No. of seasons: 1
- No. of episodes: 67

Production
- Production location: Colombia

Original release
- Network: Caracol Televisión
- Release: 26 February – 8 June 2018

Related
- Tarde lo conocí; La Reina del Flow; La jefa del campeón

La mamá del 10 is a Colombian telenovela that was produced by Caracol Televisión in 2018. The storyline of the telenovela focuses on the various challenges faced by a footballer in his quest to become a professional player, as well as the sacrifices his mother makes to support him in achieving his dream. The series features Karent Hinestroza, Diego Vásquez, Antonio Jiménez, and Marcela Benjumea in prominent roles.

== Plot ==
The telenovela "La mamá del 10" portrays the story of Tina Manotas, a woman residing in the Colombian Pacific who is compelled to leave her hometown due to economic circumstances and relocate to Bogotá, the capital of Colombia. Upon her arrival, Tina's husband abandons her, leaving her to face the financial challenges of providing for her children.

During this time, Tina discovers that her youngest son, Víctor, possesses remarkable talent in football and aspires to become a professional player. Over the years, with the unwavering support of his mother, Víctor manages to fulfill his dream. Many years later, he fulfills a long-standing promise to her and purchases an apartment in an exclusive area of the city. However, their newfound luxurious lifestyle sparks conflict with their elitist neighbors, who envy Tina's success.

== Cast ==
- Karent Hinestroza as Tina Manotas
- Marcela Benjumea as Leonor Manrique
- Diego Vásquez as Coronel Agapito Dangond
- Antonio Jiménez as Edwin Toro
- Julio Pachón as Gustavo Guatibonza
- Laura Rodríguez as Policarpa "Polita" Toro
- Cristian Mosquera as Víctor Toro Manotas « Goldi
- Carolina López as Yamile Yesenia "Yuya" Urrego
- Yesenia Valencia as Lucellys Bermúdez
- Juan Pablo Barragán as Miguel Ángel Díaz
- Andrés Rojas as Fernando Rojas « Rojitas
- Jaisson Jeack as Florentino Bonilla
- Kristina Lilley as Eugenia Velasco
- Luis Eduardo Motoa as Clemente Velasco
- Víctor Hugo Morant as Vigilante
- Alejandro García as Juan Camilo León
- María Camila Porras as Diana Velasco
- Liliana Escobar as Profesora Silvana
- Pedro Palacio as Otoniel « La Culebra » Herrera
- Rafael Zea as Ramón
- Erick Cuéllar as Pereíta
- Ernesto Ballén as Junior Guatibonza « Guatí
- Julián Farietta as José Manuel
- Brian Moreno as Walter
- Lorena García as Verónica Velasco
- Luis Fernando Salas as « El Calidoso
- Diana Isabel Acevedo as Deris
- Julieth Arrieta as Eloísa
- María Irene Toro as Policarpa Amaya
- Martha Restrepo as Pilar
- Salvatore Cassandro as Nelson Casas

== Technical details ==
- Original idea / Scripts: Héctor Rodríguez and Alejandro Torres
- Production manager: Toto Duque
- First assistant director: Luisa Riveros
- Casting: Daulis Molina
- Script: Elena Valencia and Lucía Sánchez
- Assistant directors: Laura Núñez and David Jordán
- Field director: Guillermo Mejía and Orlando Molina
- Art direction: Guarnizo & Lizarralde
- Director of photography: Germán “Ratón” Plata and Dayron Pérez
- Opening and incidental music: JOX
- Editing: Fabián Rodríguez U.
- Assistant directors: Mónica Cifuentes T. and Sandra Sánchez
- Production manager: Amparo Gutiérrez
- Vice president of production and content: Dago García
- General direction: Cecilia Vásquez and Andrés Marroquín
- General producer: Daniel Bautista

== Adaptations ==
Production of a new version of the telenovela for Mexican television, titled La jefa del campeón, was confirmed in April 2018, starring África Zavala.

== Ratings ==
Timeslot (CT)	Episodes	First aired		Last aired	
Timeslot (CT)	Episodes	Date	Premiere (millions)	Date	Finale (millions)
Mon–Fri 9:00pm	67	26 February 2018	11.9	8 June 2018	15.1

== Episodes ==
No.	Title	Original release date	Colombia viewers (millions)
Part 1
1	"Edwin pone en riesgo a su familia por culpa de sus deudas"	26 February 2018	11.9
Tina Manota accompanies her son Victor to his soccer game, but Victor is sullen by the words that his coach told him and the absence of his dad. In the meantime, Edwin tries to fix his financial problems, and Tina looks for her son to ask him why he does not want to go to the finals. After convincing him to play again, Tina thinks of her father's words. In order to offer economic stability to their children and to be able to travel, Tina and her family think about throwing a big party and charging admissions for entry.
2	"Los malos pasos de Edwin le cambian los planes a Tina"	27 February 2018	12.6
Upon learning that her husband is in debt to men of dubious reputation, Tina cries and quickly returns to her house to find the money she had collected before. She leaves as soon as possible to her hometown because she feels very worried about the threats that a man has made to her. When arriving at the port, Tina discovers that her husband is betting a lot of money. He stays there, he now owes a lot of money to all the people of the port. Due to this situation, Tina calls her father and tells him that she made the decision to go to the capital; since for no reason is she going to expose her children to something that happens to them because of Edwin's irresponsibility.
3	"Tina hace una buena jugada para ganarse la confianza de Yuya"	28 February 2018	13.6
Tina begins to look for work in Bogota. In her very first attempt she finds out about all the requirements that she must have in order to get a job; but when she realizes that it is not as easy as she thought, she goes to look for a school for her children. While she talks with the coordinator of the institution, Victor is in charge of showing the other children his skills as a soccer player. When arriving at the pension, Tina realizes that Colonel Agapito does not feel well and offers to take him to a health center; but when seeing that the Colonel does not get any better after the injection that they gave him in the drug store, Tina decides to accompany him to his work.
4	"Edwin le es infiel a Tina frente a los ojos de Víctor"	1 March 2018	15.4
After speaking with the Colonel, Tina goes to the building to meet with Mrs. Eugenia, who asks her what her economic aspirations are and also wants to tell her that if she hopes to have the job she must be internal to her home. After talking with this lady, Tina tells her family that she must sacrifice a little of her time since she managed to get a job in a family home. Meanwhile, Edwin confesses to Leonor that if it were not for his children he would leave Bogota since things with his business and with his wife are not going well. After watching Victor play, the teacher tells Tina that her son managed to enter the school.
5	"Víctor no pudo demostrar todo su talento por culpa del entrenador"	2 March 2018	13.9
Pola tells her brother Victor that she is still mad at him for leaving the house without telling anyone; however, what he did was for his mom as she was contemplating the idea of forgiving his dad. Later, Tina calls Victor alone to ask him for the truth and to confess to her why he went to look for her at her place of work. After that, Yuya asks her friend if she has a lot of problems with her husband and if this is why her son left the house. Victor asks the Colonel to accompany him to his first game since he feels he is part of his family and would be very happy with his presence. Edwin goes out to buy a very special gift to surprise his wife.
6	"Tina paga una vez más por las malas jugadas de Edwin"	5 March 2018	15.4
After observing the merchandise that Edwin bought, Leonor tells him that they are going to make sure if these jewels are real or not. Upon learning that they are, Leonor tells her partner that they should celebrate for the profits that they can get. In another place, Victor takes advantage of his stay in the house of his mother's bosses to get a little closer to Veronica and because of this he tries to convince his mother to let him accompany her to her job again. By taking the jewelry to the seller, Edwin realizes that this man cheated on him and called the police. After returning home, Eugenia realizes that her daughter is playing with Victor and for this she reproaches her for the scope that she may have in the future.
7	"Tina contacta al Culebra Herrera para que sea el técnico del equipo"	6 March 2018	15.8
Víctor wakes his mother up to show her how he plays the drums that she wants to sell. As they listen to him, Pola asks his mother when will be the day that his father returns. Somewhere else; Lucellys is very sad to see that her husband is helping one of her rivals sell the merchandise. Tina asks her friend to accompany her to look for the coach Herrera to try to convince him to train her son and the other children who want to make up the soccer team. Miguel tells his neighbors that his wife decided to throw him out of the room and now he does not know where to spend the night. After hearing his story, Yuya does not hesitate to offer his help. After receiving no response from coach Herrera, Tina asks the Colonel for a collaboration and he becomes the person to lead the team.
Part 2
8	"Pasan seis años y la exigencia para Víctor en el fútbol se hace más fuerte"	7 March 2018	15.5
After listening to Leonor, Pola asks his mother if everything that this woman says about her father is true or not. When she finds out the truth, Pola reproaches her for taking decisions alone without listening to anyone else. After having this discussion, Pola decides to go and look for her friend's brother. Tina tells her friend that she is very worried because her daughter never revealed herself and now she fears that she will not return. Seeing him packing his belongings, Lucellys warns Miguel that she does not want to see him again in Yuya's place or else she will not answer for what she is capable of doing. The next morning Otoniel tells Tina that they have problems since the organizers of the tournament are not willing to let Denis play. The Colonel introduces them to the teacher who is looking for new talents.
9	"Culebra le propone a Tina que se vayan a vivir a Santa Marta"	8 March 2018	13.2
10	"Chu Chu Wang amenaza a Tina con hacerle daño a Víctor"	9 March 2018	14.7
11	"No puede ser, Pola descubrirá algo que le romperá el corazón"	12 March 2018	16.1
12	"Tina logra negociar a Víctor para que juegue con Las Cebras"	13 March 2018	15.9
13	"Pola sospecha que su esposo le es infiel y no precisamente con una mujer"	14 March 2018	14.3
14	"Miguel Ángel descubre que Lucellys es trabajadora sexual"	15 March 2018	14.3
15	"Los problemas para Rojitas no paran y ahora su mamá corre peligro"	16 March 2018	14.0
16	"Tina viaja a Santa Marta y se estrella con el mal comportamiento de Otoniel"	20 March 2018	15.0
17	"Tina desaparece sin dejar un solo rastro"	21 March 2018	14.6
18	"Tina está secuestrada y piden millonaria suma de dinero por ella"	22 March 2018	14.6
19	"Víctor se debate entre la vida y la muerte"	23 March 2018	14.6
20	"Rojitas se arrepiente de cometer un delito y deja en libertad a Tina"	26 March 2018	16.8
21	"Pereita borracho mete la pata y cuenta que Walter es gay"	27 March 2018	15.4
22	"¿Nace una amistad?, Víctor y Rojitas empiezan a llevarse mejor"	28 March 2018	12.3
23	"Víctor, Rojitas y Guati reciben la mejor noticia de sus vidas"	2 April 2018	15.7
24	"Tina descubre dónde vive Edwin, pero al buscarlo recibe una terrible noticia"	3 April 2018	14.6
25	"Grandes ligas, Víctor juega su primer partido con la Selección Colombia en Europa"	4 April 2018	15.4
26	"Pola encuentra a su mamá tras las rejas"	5 March 2018	16.1
27	"¿Y esto qué fue?, Edwin aparece en la cárcel donde está la mamá de Pola"	6 April 2018	15.3
28	"Víctor sufre una lesión que podría poner en riesgo su carrera"	9 April 2018	16.3
29	"Víctor podría volver al fútbol, pero tendrá que pagar un precio muy alto"	10 April 2018	14.6
30	"Yuya termina en la cárcel por un delito que no cometió"	12 April 2018	14.9
31	"Es momento de sonreír, la recuperación de Víctor va viento en popa"	13 April 2018	14.5
32	"Deris perdió el bebé que esperaba de Víctor"	16 April 2018	14.1
33	"Eloísa le confiesa la verdad a Tina sobre su romance con Florentino"	17 April 2018	15.7
34	"Víctor parte rumbo a Argentina en busca de su sueño"	18 April 2018	15.0
35	"Víctor se convierte en la nueva estrella del fútbol sudamericano"	19 April 2018	14.2
36	"Víctor le cumple a Tina la promesa de su infancia"	20 April 2018	14.2
37	"Edwin aparece y arruina el matrimonio de Tina y Florentino"	23 April 2018	15.5
38	"Tina desahoga sus penas muy bien acompañada"	24 April 2018	15.0
39	"Edwin lleva a cabo su plan y termina herido en un hospital"	25 April 2018	15.0
40	"Florentino le exige a Tina que se divorcie de Edwin"	26 April 2018	14.5
41	"La conexión entre Tina y Juan Camilo crece peligrosamente"	27 April 2018	14.5
42	"Edwin se sale con la suya y logra postergar el divorcio"	30 April 2018	14.9
43	"Víctor regresa a Colombia y causa conmoción durante su visita"	2 May 2018	14.7
44	"Víctor deja a Deris e inicia un romance con otra mujer"	3 May 2018	15.1
45	"Guatibonza y Miguel Ángel lo pierden todo en el peor negocio de sus vidas"	4 May 2018	14.5
46	"Tina le tiende una trampa a Floro para descubrir su infidelidad"	7 May 2018	16.2
47	"Florentino le confiesa a Tina su infidelidad"	8 May 2018	15.0
48	"Tina inicia con el pie izquierdo su camino en el fútbol"	9 May 2018	14.9
49	"Juan Camilo ayuda a Tina a salir de la crisis"	10 May 2018	15.6
50	"En su cara, Tina le reconoce a Ana que está interesada en Juan Camilo"	11 May 2018	14.2
51	"Tina recibe una inesperada visita del pasado"	15 May 2018	14.6
52	"El coronel descubre la infidelidad de Leonor"	16 May 2018	14.0
53	"Víctor concede una entrevista y termina acabado"	17 May 2018	14.5
54	"Edwin regresa a la vida de Tina, ¿qué tramará?"	18 May 2018	14.0
55	"El coronel sufre un infarto y su vida corre peligro"	21 May 2018	14.1
56	"El coronel regresa a su hogar con Leo como su enfermera"	22 May 2018	13.4
57	"Destila lo que es la elegancia, Yuya sorprende con un radical cambio de look"	23 May 2018	13.7
58	"Víctor regresa a Colombia por una buena causa"	24 May 2018	13.1
59	"Víctor sufre un golpe que pone en riesgo su carrera"	28 May 2018	13.9
60	"Tina empieza a desconfiar de Juan Camilo"	29 May 2018	13.5
61	"Cara a cara, Gamba se enfrenta a Víctor después de la lesión"	30 May 2018	14.4
62	"Florentino pone en alerta a Tina sobre las intenciones de Edwin"	31 May 2018	13.6
63	"Juan Camilo termina en la cárcel por una demanda de los Suricatos"	1 June 2018	13.1
64	"Lucellys declara en contra de Edwin y Pilar"	5 June 2018	15.4
65	"Victor recibe una nueva oportunidad en el fútbol"	6 June 2018	14.5
66	"¿Aceptará?, Víctor le pide matrimonio a Deris"	7 June 2018	15.4
67	"Meta cumplida, Víctor se juega el mundial de su vida en Rusia"	8 June 2018	15.1
