= Andrés Parra =

Colombian actor

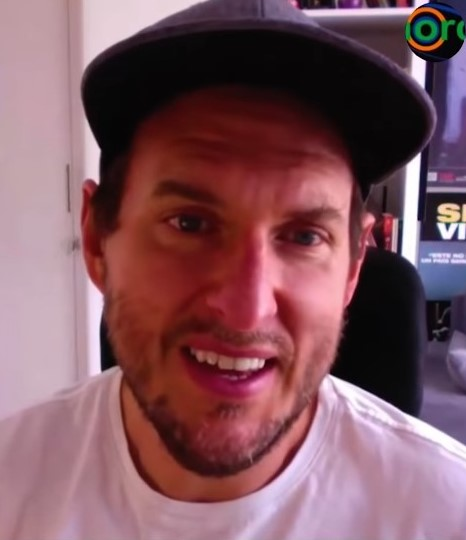
- Born: 18 September 1977 (age 48); Cali, Colombia
- Occupations: Film and television actor
- Notable credit: Pablo Escobar, el patrón del mal

Andrés Parra Medina (born 18 September 1977) is a Colombian film and television actor. He is known for portraying the drug lord Pablo Escobar in the Canal Caracol TV series Pablo Escobar, el patrón del mal.

== Filmography ==
=== Film ===
- Santuario (2003)
- El Trato (2004)
- Ciudad Crónica (2005)
- Ojos que no ven (2006)
- Ventanas (2006)
- Satanàs (2007) - Pablo
- El amor en los tiempos del cólera (2007)
- Perro come perro (2006)
- Dr. Alemán (2007)
- Collar de Perlas (2007)
- Cria Cuervos (2007)
- Nochebuena (2008)
- QR9 16 48 (2008)
- La pasión de Gabriel (2009)
- Los futbolistas (2009)
- Sanandresito (2011)
- El Cartel De Los Sapos: La Película (2012)
- The Vanished Elephant (2014)
- The Seed of Silence (2015)
- La odisea de los giles (2019)
- La orgia de mil penes (2024)

=== Television ===
- Por amor a Gloria (2005)
- Casados con hijos (2005)
- Nuevo rico, nuevo pobre (2007)
- El cartel (2008)
- Muñoz vale por 2 (2008)
- Cámara café (2008)
- El encantador (2009)
- El cartel 2 (2010)
- Hilos de amor (2010)
- Operación Jaque (2010)
- Amar y temer (2011)
- La bruja (2011)
- Pablo Escobar, el patrón del mal (2012) - Pablo Escobar
- El Señor de los Cielos (2013) - Pablo Escobar
- La Suegra (2014) - René Higuera del Castillo
- La Viuda Negra (2014) - Pablo Escobar
- El Comandante (2016) - Hugo Chávez
- El Presidente (TV series) (2020) - Sergio Jadue
- Estado de Fuga 2025 Netflix
