= Javier Fuentes-León =

Peruvian film director

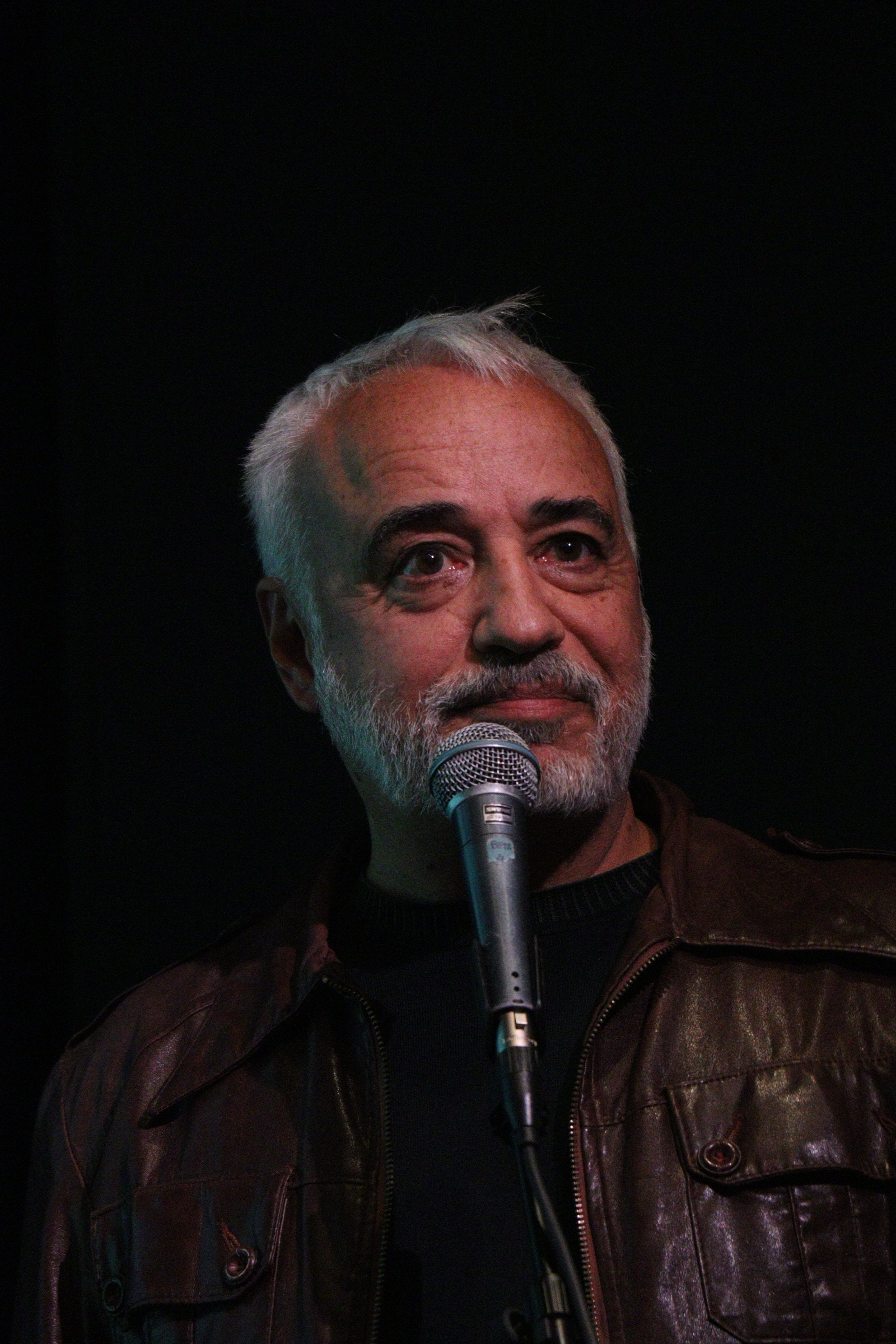
- Fuentes-León at the 29th Lima Film Festival (2025)
- Born: Peru
- Occupations: Film director, screenwriter

Javier Fuentes-León is a Peruvian film director based in Los Angeles and best known for his directorial long-feature debut Undertow (Spanish title Contracorriente) that starred Cristian Mercado as Miguel, a fisherman who is torn between his love for his pregnant wife Mariela played by Tatiana Astengo and a painter artist Santiago played by Manolo Cardona.

The film, a co-production between Peru, Colombia, France and Germany, was nominated for the Grand Jury Prize in the Dramatic category at the 2010 Sundance Film Festival and actually won the World Cinema Audience Award . It also won the Sebastiane Award at the San Sebastián International Film Festival.

Fuentes-León was born in Peru and graduated from Medical School in Peru, but made a radical change by moving to Los Angeles in 1994 to pursue a career in film directing by studying for a Master of Fine Arts (MFA) at the California Institute of the Arts (CalArts). His thesis film, Espacios won the National Award for Short Films from the Peruvian government in 1997. He also wrote a theatrical piece Mr. Clouds in 2000, which the National Theater of Peru considered among the best of the year and published it in the compilation Dramaturgia Nacional 2000.

In the following years, Fuentes-León worked as the lead writer for reality TV shows at the Telemundo in the U.S., subtitled films from major Hollywood studios into Spanish, and worked as an editor of commercials and TV shows, including Rachael Ray's Tasty Travels for the Food Network, while focusing on his own writing and directing projects.

His second short Géminis premiered Outfest in 2004 and screened at various international film festivals.

Currently, Fuentes-León is developing various projects including The Woman Who Feared the Sun (based on his play Mr. Clouds) and Sinister, a rock musical set in a restrictive society of the near future, for which Fuentes-León is writing the music as well.

== Filmography ==
Director

- 1997: Espacios (short)
- 2004: Géminis (short)
- 2009: Undertow (Spanish title Contracorriente)
- 2014: The Vanished Elephant
- 2020: The Best Families

Producer

- 2004: Géminis (short)
- 2009: Undertow

Screenwriter

- 1997: Espacios (short)
- 2004: Géminis (short)
- 2009: Undertow
- 2017: Av. Larco
- 2020: The Best Families

Editor

- 1997: Espacios (short)
- 2004: Géminis (short)
- 2005: Un dia en la vida (short)
- 2008: Rachael Ray's Tasty Travels (TV series documentary) (episode: "Martha's Vineyard")

Actor

- 2004: Géminis as Géminis (short)
- 2006: I Heart as Karoke Buddy (short)

Others

- 2007: Spine Tingler! The William Castle Story (documentary) (special thanks)
- 2008: Wrangler: Anatomy of an Icon (documentary) (special thanks)
- 2011: Vito (documentary) (special thanks)

== Awards and nominations ==
For Undertow

- 2009: Won Sebastiane Award at the San Sebastián International Film Festival
- 2010: Won Audience Awards for "World Cinema - Dramatic" category at the Sundance Film Festival
- 2010: Nominated for Grand Jury Prize for "World Cinema - Dramatic" category at the Sundance Film Festival
- 2010: Won Audience Award at the Lima Latin American Film Festival
- 2010: Won Audience Award for Ibero-American competition at Miami Film Festival
- 2010: Nominated for Golden India Catalina for "Best Film (Mejor Película)" at Cartagena Film Festival
- 2011: Nominated for Goya for "Best Spanish Language Foreign Film" at Goya Awards
