= Fabián Ríos (actor) =

Colombian actor and model (born 1980)

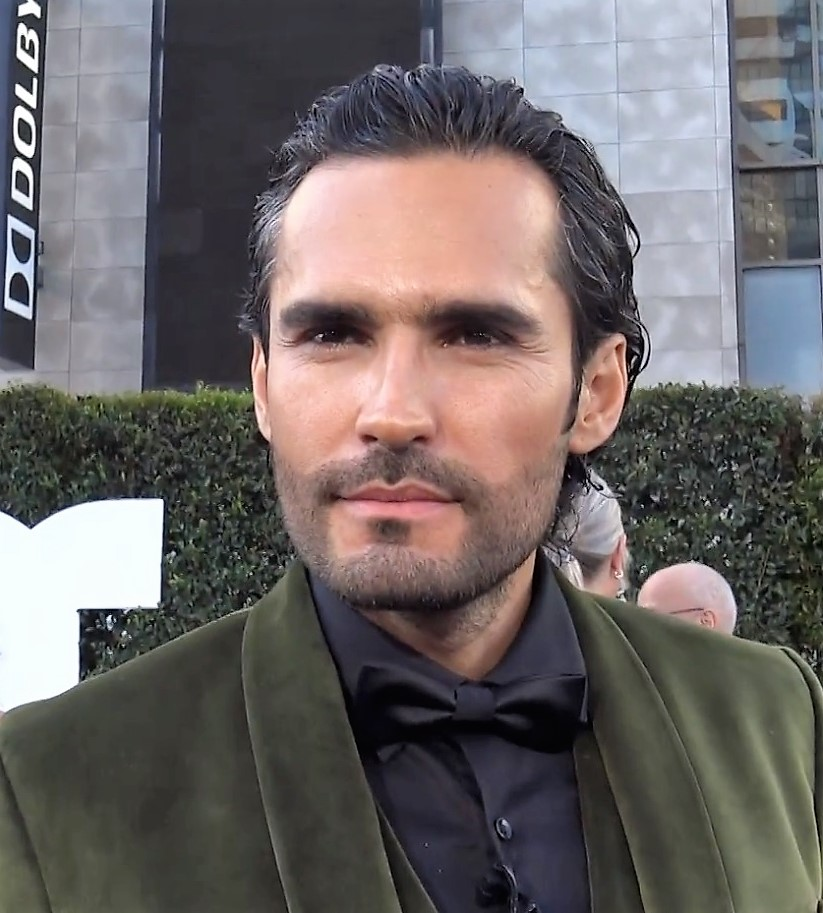
- Ríos interviewed by Dulce Osuna in 2016
- Born: July 5, 1980 (age 46); Curití, Santander, Colombia
- Occupations: Actor; model
- Years active: 2002–present
- Notable work: Padres e hijos; Floricienta; Sin senos no hay paraíso; Doña Bella; Corazón Valiente; Dama y Obrero; Tierra de reyes; Sin senos sí hay paraíso; La Fan; Telemundo
- Spouse: Yuly Ferreira (m. 2005)
- Children: 2

Fabián Ríos (born July 5, 1980) is a Colombian actor and model. He is best known for his appearance in Sin senos no hay paraíso (2008) and Sin senos sí hay paraíso (2016-2019). He also starred in Tierra de reyes (2015).

== Early life ==
Ríos was born in Curití, Santander, Colombia. From a very young age, he left his village in pursuit of his dream. Upon arriving in Bucaramanga, he began his acting studies and quickly fell into modeling, then various contracts that enabled him to support himself and family.

== Career ==
Ríos gradually became involved in the field of television and took part in several programs from the city's regional channel.

Some time later, he moved to Bogotá to attend the country's most prestigious acting schools and begin to join the jet set.

He acted in a young love story called Siete Veces Amada in 2002, and thanks to this interpretation was nominated Best Young Actor Premios TV y Novelas - Colombia. The following year, he played the villain in The Authentic Rodrigo Leal, and has frequently been cast as a villain in telenovelas.

In 2005, Rios starred in Padres e Hijos as 'Antonio Vaquero'.

For RCN, in 2007 he once again played the villain in the Colombian version of Floricienta, then joined the cast of Zona Rosa.

In 2008, he joined the cast of Sin Senos no hay Paraíso for Telemundo with Carmen Villalobos and Catherine Siachoque, playing Albeiro. The third-season premieres in June on Telemundo

In 2009, he was hired by RCN to star in Doña Bella with Zharick León, Marcelo Buquet and Stephanie Cayo.

In 2010, he signed an exclusivity contract with Telemundo to be the main antagonist of the U.S. telenovela El Fantasma de Elena with Elizabeth Gutiérrez, Segundo Cernadas, and Ana Layevska

In 2011, he acted in Los Herederos Del Monte with Marlene Favela and Mario Cimarro, and in Mi Corazón Insiste with Jencarlos Canela and Carmen Villalobos. He was also part of the jury panel in the Miss Universe Puerto Rico 2012 on Telemundo Puerto Rico.

In 2012, he acted in Corazón Valiente in the role of Willy del Castillo, with Ximena Duque, Aylín Mújica, Adriana Fonseca and José Luis Reséndez. This role gained him 2 awards at the Premios Tu Mundo 2012: Best Couple and Best Kiss with actress Ximena Duque.

In 2013, he play again a villain role in Dama y Obrero, with his El Fantasma de Elena and Mi Corazón Insiste co-star Ana Layevska, and his Los Herederos Del Monte and Corazón Valiente co-star José Luis Reséndez.

In 2014, he appear in the second season of the show Top Chef Estrellas.

In 2014, he play again a villain role in Tierra de reyes with his Corazón Valiente special participation co-star Sonya Smith.

== Filmography ==
Television performance
Year	Title	Roles	Notes
2002	Siete veces Amada	Romero	
2003	El auténtico Rodrigo Leal	Jackson	
2004	Padres e hijos	Antonio Vaquero	
2006	Floricienta	Pedro	
2007	Zona Rosa	Fernando Orozco	
2008–2009	Sin senos no hay paraíso	Albeiro Manrique	Main role; 167 episodes
2010	Doña Bella	Antonio Segovia	Main role; 88 episodes
2010–2011	El fantasma de Elena	Montecristo Palacios	Main role; 117 episodes
2011	Los herederos del Monte	Gaspar del Monte	Main role; 128 episodes
2011	Mi corazón insiste en Lola Volcán	Ángel Meléndez	Main role; 133 episodes
2012–2013	Corazón Valiente	Guillermo "Willy" del Castillo	Main role; 206 episodes
2013	Dama y obrero	Tomás Villamayor	Main role; 115 episodes
2014–2015	Tierra de reyes	Leonardo Montalvo	Main role; 160 episodes
2016–2018	Sin senos sí hay paraíso	Albeiro Marín	Main role (seasons 1–3); 240 episodes
2017	La Fan	Guillermo "Willy" del Castillo	Guest star; 7 episodes
2019	El final del paraíso	Albeiro Marín	Main role (season 4); 82 episodes
2020–2021	100 días para enamorarnos	Iván Acosta	Guest star (seasons 1–2); 51 episodes
2022	Hasta que la plata nos separe	Wilfer Fonseca "El Dandy"	Recurring role; 88 episodes
2024	Los 50	Himself	Reality show
2025	Miss Universe Latina, el reality	Himself	Judge
