= Doña Bella =

- Genre: Romance, Drama
- Created by: Wilson Aguiar Filho (original version)
- Developed by: RCN TV; TeleFutura
- Written by: Daniella Castagno (adaptation)
- Directed by: Toni Navia
- Starring: Zharick León; Fabián Ríos (actor); Marcelo Buquet; Luis Fernando Múnera; Xilena Aycardi; Stephanie Cayo; Pedro Rendón
- Countries of origin: United States; Colombia
- Original language: Spanish
- No. of episodes: 88

Production
- Producers: Armando Barbosa; Federico Castillo
- Production locations: Bogotá, Colombia
- Camera setup: Multi-camera
- Running time: 42-45 minutes

Original release
- Network: RCN TV; TeleFutura
- Release: April 25 – September 19, 2011

Doña Bella is a 2010 Colombian telenovela remake of the original 1986 Brazilian production titled Dona Beija, commissioned and produced by Telefutura. The latter series was derived from various Brazilian novels centered on the life of historical persona Ana Jacinta de São José.

The series aired weeknights at 8pm central on Telefutura starting on April 25, 2011, and ended its run on September 19, 2011, with 97 episodes.

The opening theme song is Bella by Carlos Aguera y Mariatta.

== Plot ==
The telenovela incorporates themes of forbidden love, betrayal and revenge, as well as personal sacrifice and perseverance.

Bella Cepeda is a beautiful young woman who is in love with her childhood friend, Antonio Segovia, a member of a prominent conservative family. As a consequence of her unequal social station, Bella has to contend with the inevitable heartaches caused by the Segovia family's distrust and contempt of her relationship with Antonio. The central character's life worries are amplified when she becomes the target of desire of an unscrupulous, yet powerful businessman, Román Montero, who is lured to the banana exporting region from the capital city with the hopes of tapping into the underdeveloped local economy. Infatuated by Bella, Señor Montero intends to make her his lover, however, upon rejection by the maiden, he abducts her and secludes her in his grand estate.

During her captivity, nobody, particularly her beloved Antonio, comes to her rescue. On the contrary, Antonio is led to believe that Bella willingly initiates a romance with Montero, motivated by avarice. Further compounding the heroine's misfortune is the loss of her remaining family member, effectively becoming deprived of family and love. Abandoned by loved ones and abused by a degenerate, a young Bella's heart is poisoned with bitterness. Notwithstanding, she refuses to suffocate under her calamity and determines to take back charge of her life. She accomplishes her goal by engaging in the sex trade, soon being able to amass wealth and a particular prestige. As a whole new woman, she returns to her home village, Agua Hermosa, with a singular aim in mind: to take revenge against those that did her wrong. At the top of her list are her former lover Antonio and her former tormentor Román.

== Cast ==
- Zharick León - Bella Cepeda
- Fabián Ríos - Antonio Segovia
- Marcelo Buquet - Román Montero
- Luis Fernando Salas - David Caballero
- Stephanie Cayo - Evangelina Rosales
- Jorge López - Dr. Alcides Guzmán
- Javier Delguidice - Pablo Segovia
- Pedro Rendón - Andrés Mendoza
- Xilena Aycardi - Juanita González
- Armando Gutiérrez - Moisés Pérez
- Gloria Zapata - Cecilia de Segovia
- Gloria Montoya - Silvia Salazar
- Alfonso Ortiz - Padre Miguel Arteaga
- Luis Fernando Munera - Fernando Cepeda
- María Luisa Flores - Inés Segovia
- Daniel Arenas - Nicolás Ayala
- Edmundo Troya - Julián Rosales
- Sandra Pérez - Graciela de Rosales
- Luis Enrique Roldán - Claudio Mendoza
- Linda Lucía Callejas - Carolina de Mendoza
- Juan Pablo Obregón - Aurelio Sotomayor
- Alejandra Ávila - Consuelo Molina
- Margarita Amado - Delia de Fernández
- Ana María Oyola - Mariana Oyola
- Luz Del Sol Neisa - Maria Antonia Segovia Cepeda
- Mariana Garzón - Andrea Fernanda Mendoza Cepeda
