= The Masked Singer Brasil season 3 =

The Masked Singer Brasil
- Season 3
- Starring: Eduardo Sterblitch; Mateus Solano; Sabrina Sato; Taís Araújo
- Hosted by: Ivete Sangalo; Priscilla Alcantara
- No. of contestants: 14
- Winners: Flay as "DJ Vitória-Régia"
- Runners-up: Larissa Luz as "Abelha-Rainha"
- No. of episodes: 12

Release
- Original network: TV Globo
- Original release: January 22 – April 9, 2023

Season chronology
- ← Previous; Season 2

The third season of The Masked Singer Brasil premiered on January 22, 2023, on TV Globo, following a sneak peek episode that aired on January 15.

On April 9, 2023, singer Flay won the competition as "DJ Vitória-Régia" (DJ Water-Lily), with singer/tv host Larissa Luz finishing second as "Abelha-Rainha" (Queen Bee), and multimedia Xamã placing third as "Galo" (Rooster).

== Hosts and panelists ==
Ivete Sangalo returned for her third season as the main host, alongside Priscilla Alcantara who returned for her second season as the show's backstage host.

Eduardo Sterblitch and Taís Araújo returned for their third season as panelists, while Tatá Werneck and Rodrigo Lombardi were unable to return due to other commitments.

On November 30, 2022, it was announced that TV host Sabrina Sato would join the series as a new panelist and Tatá Werneck's replacement. Actor Mateus Solano was revealed as Rodrigo Lombardi's replacement at the panel on December 13, 2022.

=== Guest panelists ===
Episode	Name	Occupation
3	David Junior	Actor
4	Nanda Costa	Actress
5	Xande de Pilares	Singer
6	Mel Maia	Actress
7	Jão	Singer
8	Kleber Lucas	Singer
9	Joelma	Singer
10	Douglas Silva	Actor
11	Deborah Secco	Actress

== Contestants ==
Results
Stage name	Celebrity	Occupation(s)	Episodes											
Stage name	Celebrity	Occupation(s)	1	2	3	4	5	6	7	8	9	10	11	12
DJ Vitória-Régia (DJ Water-Lily)	Flay	Singer		SAFE		WIN	SAFE	SAFE	WIN	SAFE	RISK	SAFE	RISK	WINNER
Abelha-Rainha (Queen Bee)	Larissa Luz	Singer	SAFE		WIN		SAFE	SAFE	WIN	SAFE	WIN	SAFE	WIN	RUNNER-UP
Galo (Rooster)	Xamã	Rapper		SAFE		RISK	SAFE	SAFE	WIN	SAFE	WIN	RISK	WIN	THIRD
Vovó Tartaruga (Grandma Turtle)	Nanda Costa	Actress	SAFE		WIN		SAFE	SAFE	WIN	SAFE	WIN	RISK	OUT	
Dinossauro (Dinosaur)	Mano Walter	Singer	RISK		RISK		SAFE	SAFE	RISK	SAFE	RISK	OUT		
Coruja (Owl)	Babu Santana	Actor/Singer		SAFE		WIN	SAFE	RISK	RISK	RISK	OUT			
Capivara (Capybara)	Solange Couto	Actress	SAFE		WIN		SAFE	SAFE	RISK	OUT				
Filtro de Barro (Clay Water Filter)	Richarlyson	Former football player		SAFE		WIN	SAFE	RISK	OUT					
Os Suculentos (The Succulents)	Patricia Marx	Singers	SAFE		RISK		RISK	OUT						
Os Suculentos (The Succulents)	Rosana	Singers	SAFE		RISK		RISK	OUT						
Os Suculentos (The Succulents)	Sylvinho Blau-Blau	Singers	SAFE		RISK		RISK	OUT						
Romeu & Julieta (Romeo & Juliet)	Emanuelle Araújo	Actress/Singer		RISK		RISK	OUT							
Romeu & Julieta (Romeo & Juliet)	Tatau	Singer		RISK		RISK	OUT							
Circo (Circus)	Fernando Fernandes	Paralympic athlete		SAFE		OUT								
Milho de Milhões (Millions Corn)	Marcelo Serrado	Actor	SAFE		OUT									
Broco Lee	Érika Januza	Actress		OUT										
Coelho (Rabbit)	Paulo Betti	Actor	OUT											

The masked singer won their face-off.
The masked singer lost their face-off.
The masked singer was safe from elimination.
The masked singer was eliminated from the competition and unmasked upon their elimination.
The masked singer did not perform.
The masked singer took third place.
The masked singer was the runner-up.
The masked singer won the competition.
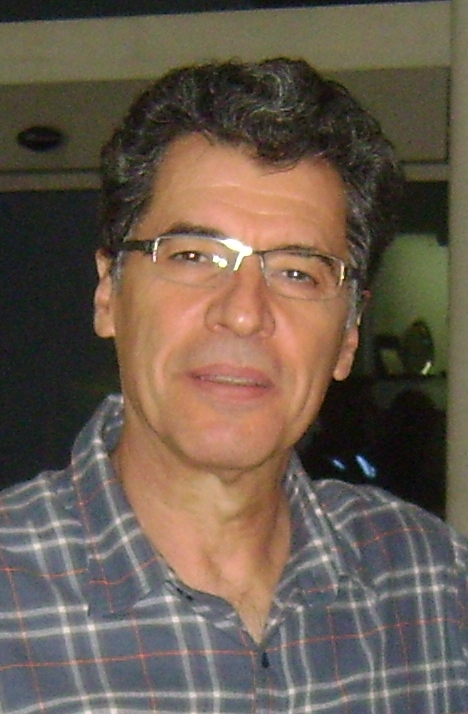
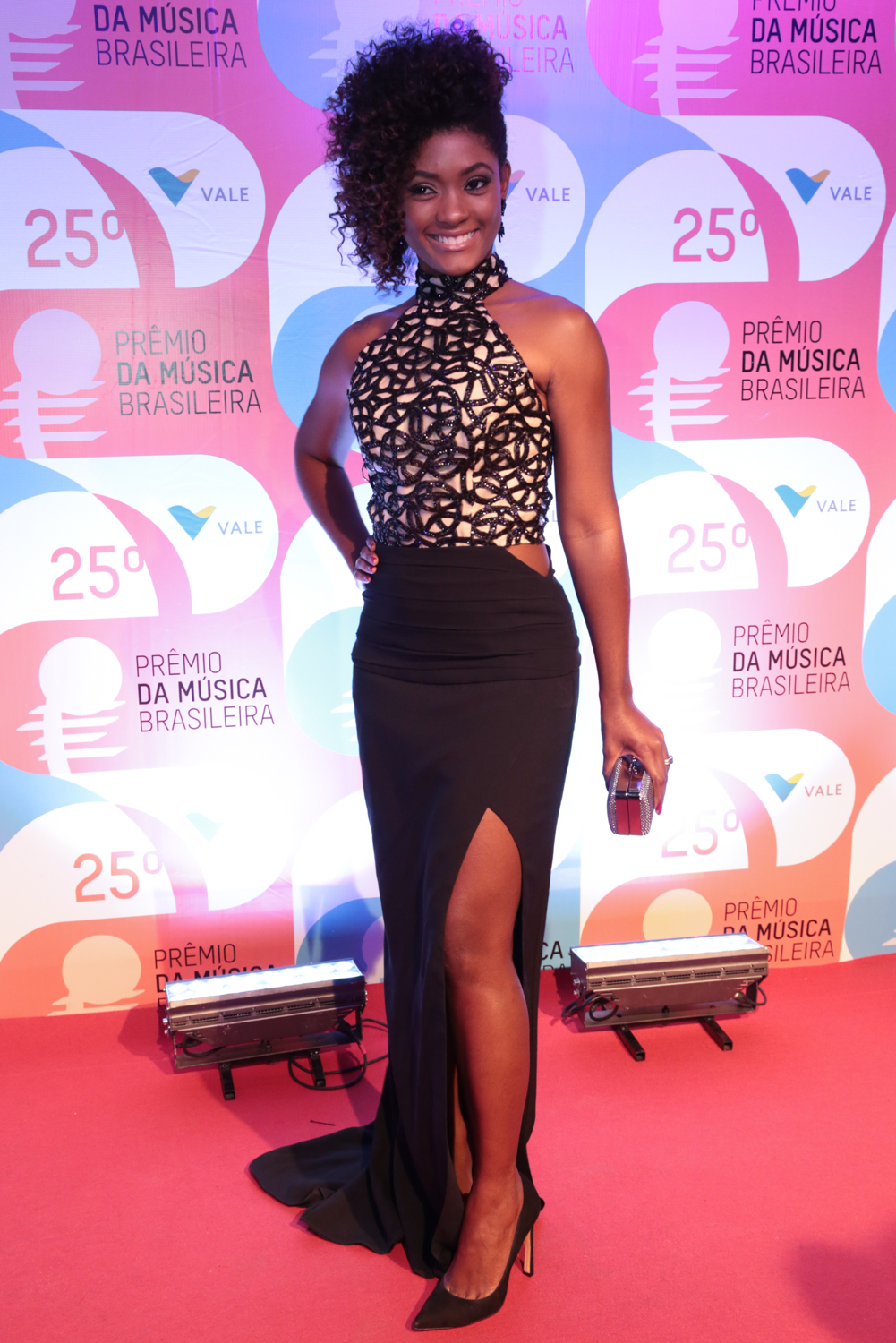
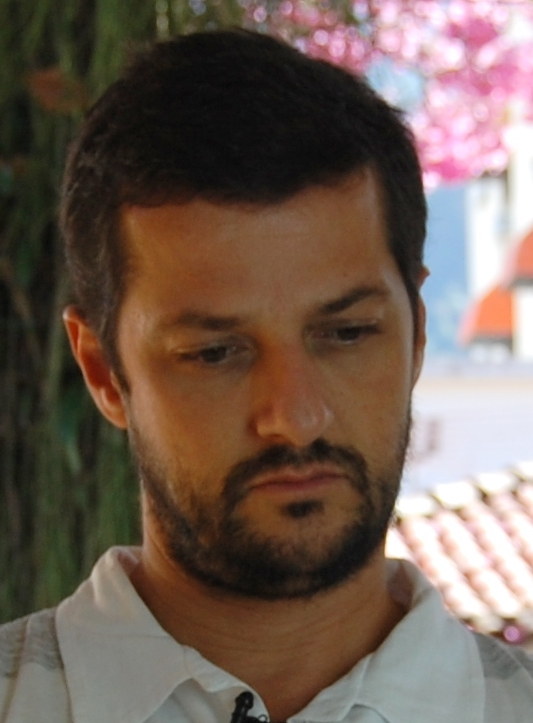
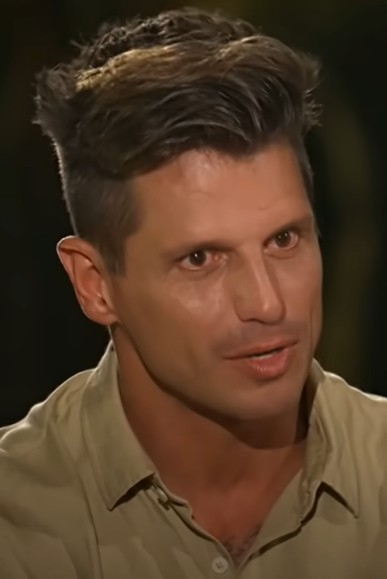
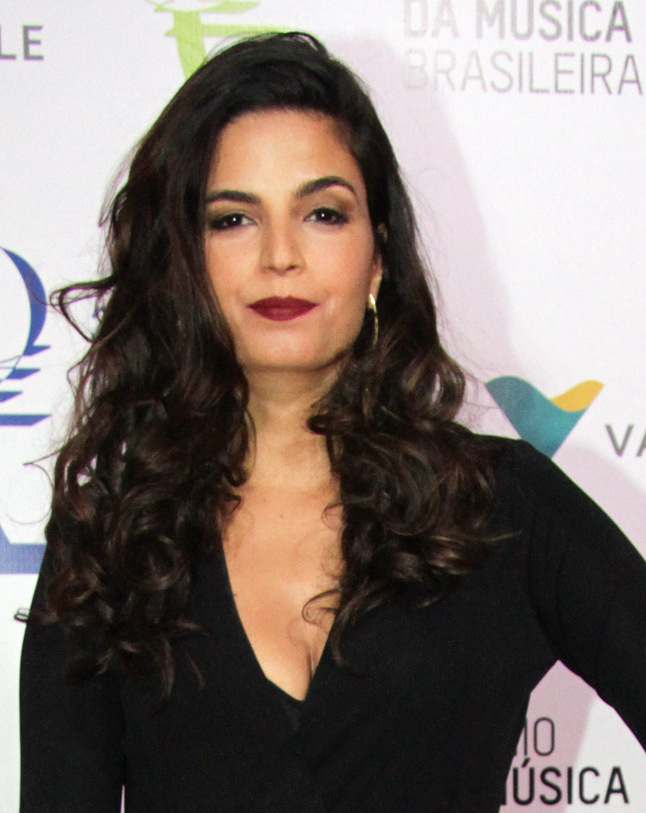
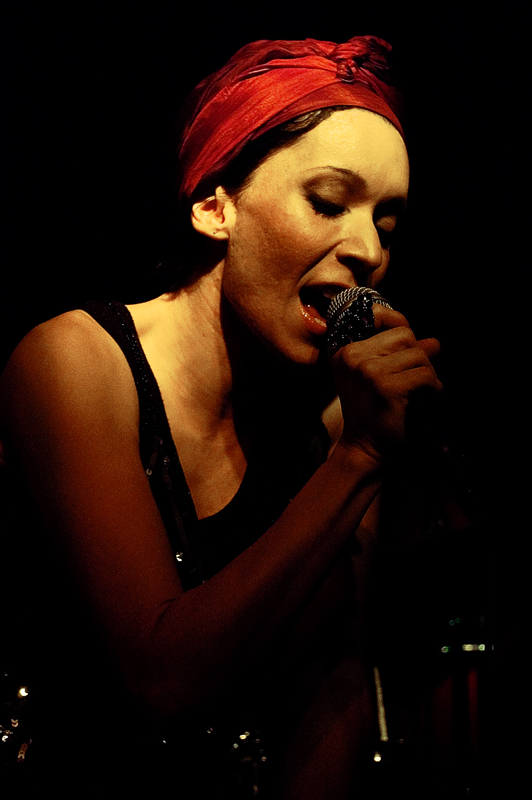
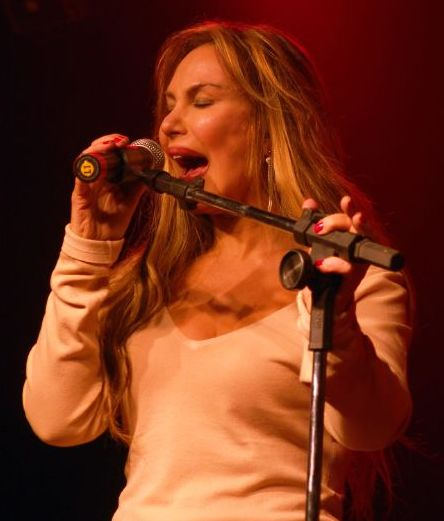
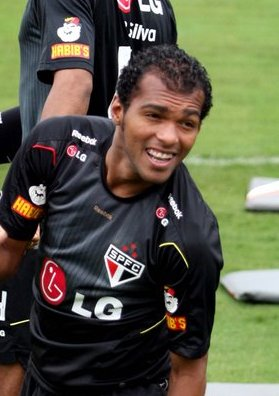
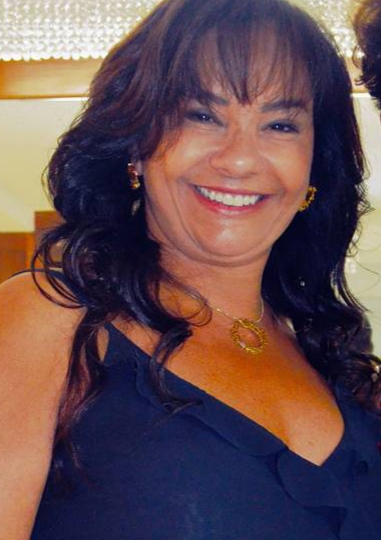
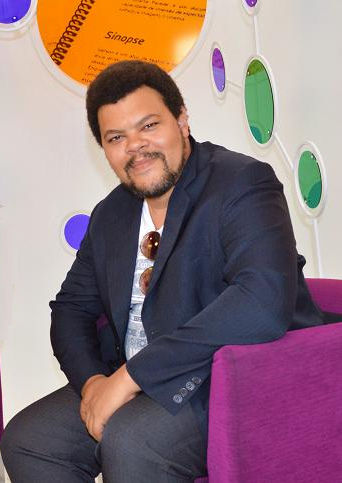
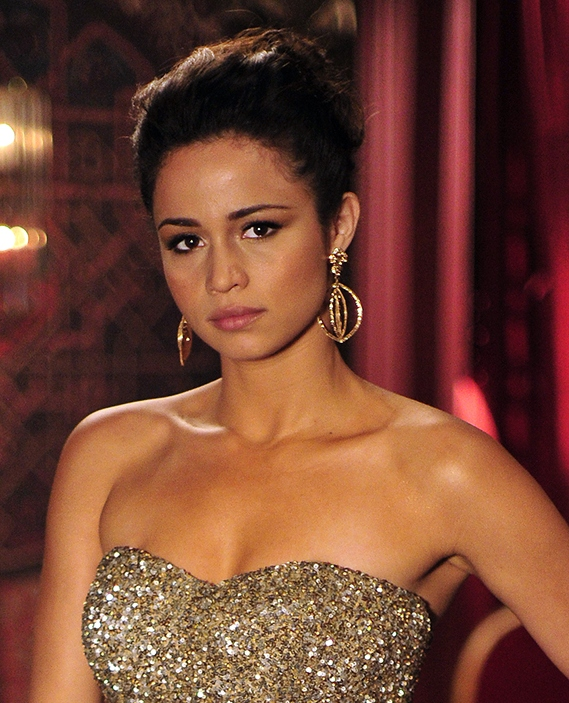
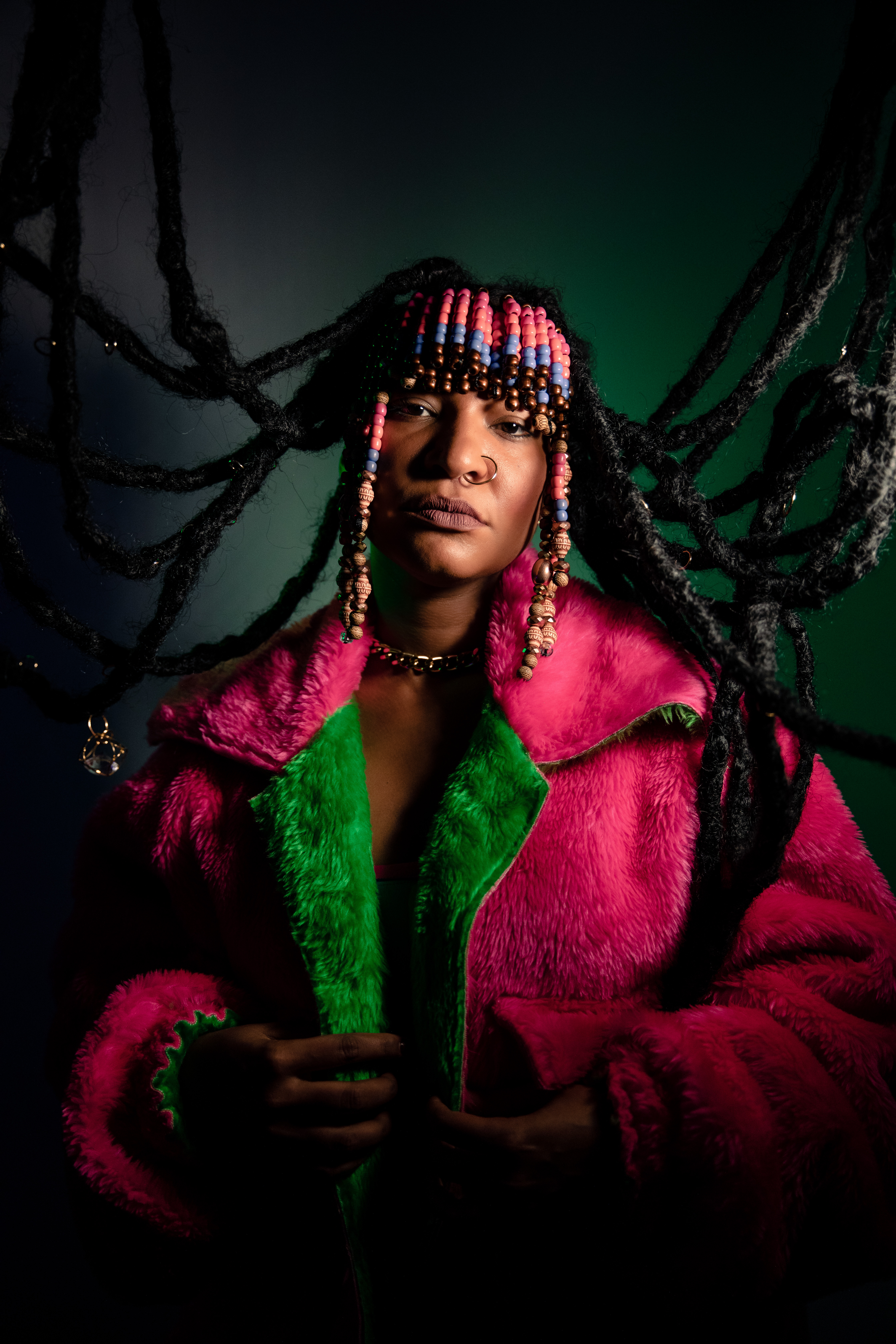
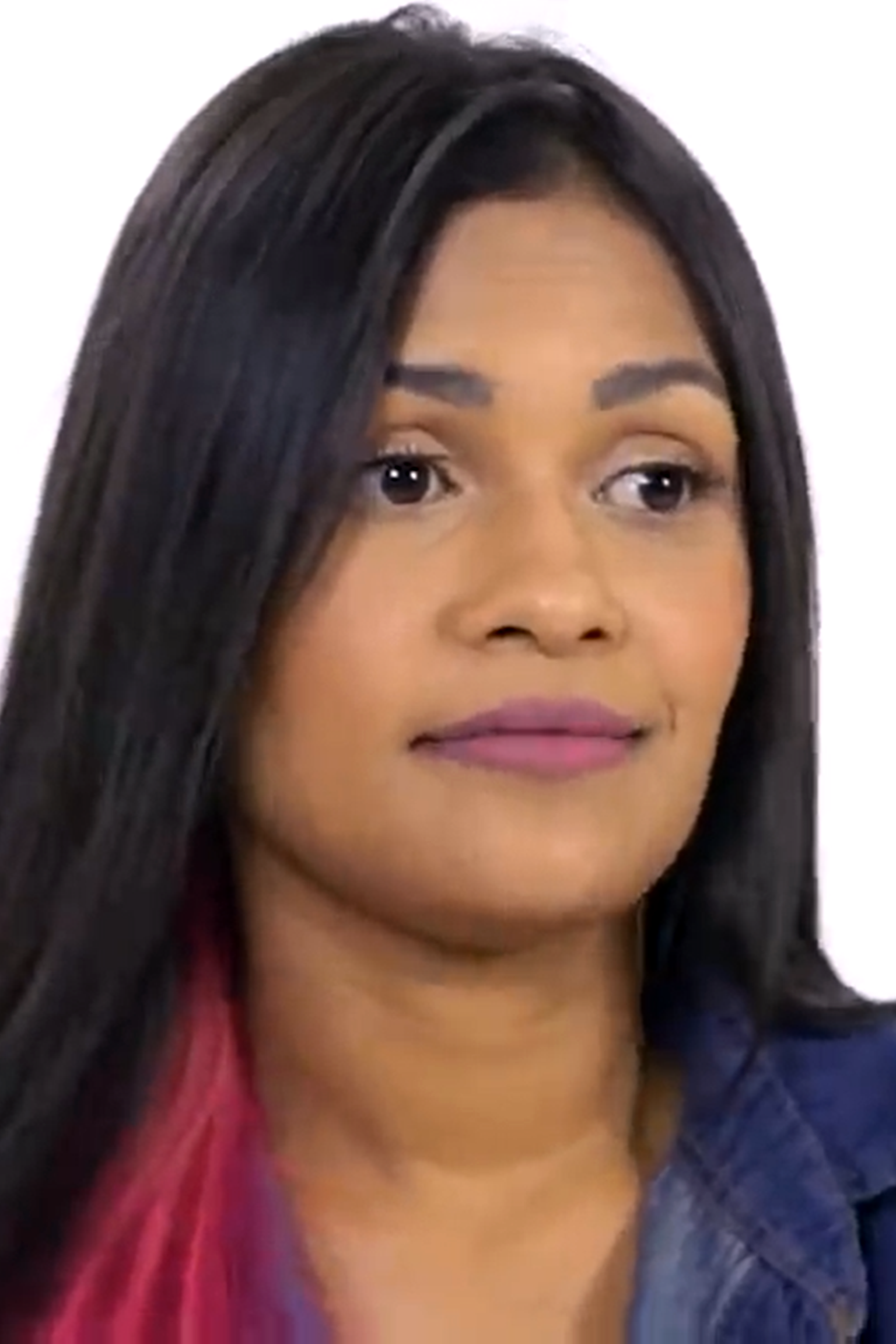
The celebrities who competed in the third season of The Masked Singer Brasil, pictured in order of elimination (L–R):

Paulo Betti (Coelho), Érika Januza (Broco Lee), Marcelo Serrado (Milho de Milhões), Fernando Fernandes (Circo), Emanuelle Araújo (Julieta), Patricia Marx and Rosana (Os Suculentos), Richarlyson (Filtro de Barro), Solange Couto (Capivara), Babu Santana (Coruja), Nanda Costa (Vovó Tartaruga), Xamã (Galo), Larissa Luz (Abelha-Rainha), Flay (DJ Vitória-Régia)

Not pictured: Tatau (Romeu), Sylvinho Blau-Blau (Os Suculentos), Mano Walter (Dinossauro)

== Episodes ==
=== Week 1 (January 22) ===
Performances on the first episode
#	Stage name	Song	Identity	Result
1	Abelha-Rainha	"Zap Zum" by Pabllo Vittar	undisclosed	SAFE
2	Os Suculentos	"I Will Survive" by Gloria Gaynor/"Survivor" by Destiny's Child	undisclosed	SAFE
3	Coelho	"A Kind of Magic" by Queen/"Sway" by Michael Bublé/"Mamãe Passou Açúcar Em Mim" by Wilson Simonal	undisclosed	RISK
4	Milho de Milhões	"Peão Apaixonado" by Rionegro & Solimões	undisclosed	SAFE
5	Capivara	"Rainha da Favela" by Ludmilla/"Material Girl" by Madonna	undisclosed	SAFE
6	Dinossauro	"Proibida Pra Mim" by Charlie Brown Jr.	undisclosed	RISK
7	Vovó Tartaruga	"Vai Malandra" by Anitta/"Olha a Explosão" by Kevinho	undisclosed	SAFE
Duel			Identity	Result
8	Coelho	"Fogo e Paixão" by Wando	Paulo Betti	OUT
8	Dinossauro	"Fogo e Paixão" by Wando	undisclosed	SAFE

=== Week 2 (January 29) ===
Performances on the second episode
#	Stage name	Song	Identity	Result
1	Coruja	"Get Up (I Feel Like Being A) Sex Machine/I Got You" by James Brown	undisclosed	SAFE
2	Broco Lee	"Sua Cara" by Major Lazer feat. Anitta and Pabllo Vittar	undisclosed	RISK
3	Filtro de Barro	"Essa Tal Liberdade" by Fábio Jr. and Só Pra Contrariar/"Conquista" by Claudinho & Buchecha	undisclosed	SAFE
4	DJ Vitória-Régia	"Something's Got a Hold on Me" by Etta James/"Sentou e Gostou" by Jottapê/"Bang Bang" by Ariana Grande, Jessie J and Nicki Minaj	undisclosed	SAFE
5	Circo	"O Circo" by Nara Leão/"O Vencedor" by Los Hermanos	undisclosed	SAFE
6	Romeu & Julieta	"Um Dia de Domingo" by Gal Costa and Tim Maia	undisclosed	RISK
7	Galo	"Frevo Mulher" by Zé Ramalho	undisclosed	SAFE
Duel			Identity	Result
8	Broco Lee	"Pro Dia Nascer Feliz" by Barão Vermelho	Érika Januza	OUT
8	Romeu & Julieta	"Pro Dia Nascer Feliz" by Barão Vermelho	undisclosed	SAFE

=== Week 3 (February 5) ===
Performances on the third episode
#	Stage name	Song	Identity	Result	
1	Vovó Tartaruga	"Vâmo Pulá!" by Sandy & Junior	undisclosed	68%	WIN
2	Dinossauro	"Minha Fama de Mau" by Erasmo Carlos	undisclosed	32%	RISK
3	Capivara	"Caça e Caçador" by Fábio Jr.	undisclosed	79%	WIN
4	Milho de Milhões	"For Once in My Life" by Stevie Wonder	Marcelo Serrado	21%	OUT
5	Os Suculentos	"Dancing Queen" by ABBA	undisclosed	24%	RISK
6	Abelha-Rainha	"Feeling Good" by Nina Simone	undisclosed	76%	WIN

=== Week 4 (February 12) ===
Performances on the fourth episode
#	Stage name	Song	Identity	Result	
1	Galo	"Tipo Gin" by Kevin O Chris	undisclosed	45%	RISK
2	DJ Vitória-Régia	"Disk Me" by Pabllo Vittar/"Hello" by Adele	undisclosed	55%	WIN
3	Filtro de Barro	"Dançarina" by Pedro Sampaio feat. MC Pedrinho	undisclosed	68%	WIN
4	Circo	"Sujeito de Sorte" by Belchior	Fernando Fernandes	32%	OUT
5	Coruja	"Lepo Lepo" by Psirico/"Malvadão 3" by Xamã (Prod. DJ Gustah & Neo Beats)	undisclosed	64%	WIN
6	Romeu & Julieta	"Você Partiu Meu Coração" by Nego do Borel feat. Anitta and Wesley Safadão	undisclosed	36%	RISK

=== Week 5 (February 19) ===
- Theme: Carnival Duets

Performances on the fifth episode
#	Stage name	Song	Identity	Result
1	Dinossauro	"Passa Mal" by Marília Mendonça	undisclosed	SAFE
1	Filtro de Barro	"Passa Mal" by Marília Mendonça	undisclosed	SAFE
2	DJ Vitória-Régia	"Jamburana" by Dona Onete	undisclosed	SAFE
2	Vovó Tartaruga	"Jamburana" by Dona Onete	undisclosed	SAFE
3	Romeu & Julieta	"É Hoje" by União da Ilha do Governador	undisclosed	RISK
3	Os Suculentos	"É Hoje" by União da Ilha do Governador	undisclosed	RISK
4	Capivara	"Terremoto" by Anitta & Kevinho	undisclosed	SAFE
4	Coruja	"Terremoto" by Anitta & Kevinho	undisclosed	SAFE
5	Abelha-Rainha	"Banho de Cheiro" by Elba Ramalho	undisclosed	SAFE
5	Galo	"Banho de Cheiro" by Elba Ramalho	undisclosed	SAFE
Smackdown			Identity	Result
6	Os Suculentos	"Brasil Pandeiro" by Novos Baianos	undisclosed	SAFE
6	Romeu & Julieta	"Rapunzel" by Daniela Mercury	Emanuelle Araújo	OUT
6	Romeu & Julieta	"Rapunzel" by Daniela Mercury	Tatau	OUT

- After being unmasked, Emanuelle and Tatau sang "Tá Escrito" from Grupo Revelação as their encore performance.

=== Week 6 (February 26) ===
- Theme: Telenovelas

Performances on the sixth episode
#	Stage name	Song	Telenovela	Identity	Result	
1	Os Suculentos	"Dancin' Days" by As Frenéticas	Dancin' Days	Patricia Marx	04%	OUT
1	Os Suculentos	"Dancin' Days" by As Frenéticas	Dancin' Days	Rosana	04%	OUT
1	Os Suculentos	"Dancin' Days" by As Frenéticas	Dancin' Days	Sylvinho Blau-Blau	04%	OUT
2	DJ Vitória-Régia	"Ex Mai Love" by Gaby Amarantos	Cheias de Charme	undisclosed	16%	SAFE
3	Dinossauro	"Oceano" by Djavan	Top Model	undisclosed	09%	SAFE
4	Filtro de Barro	"Sobradinho" by Chico César	Mar do Sertão	undisclosed	05%	RISK
5	Abelha-Rainha	"Meu Bem, Meu Mal" by Gal Costa	Meu Bem, Meu Mal	undisclosed	26%	SAFE
6	Capivara	"Baila Comigo" by Rita Lee	Baila Comigo	undisclosed	06%	SAFE
7	Galo	"Me Chama Que Eu Vou" by Sidney Magal	Rainha da Sucata	undisclosed	17%	SAFE
8	Coruja	"Óculos" by Os Paralamas do Sucesso	Verão 90	undisclosed	03%	RISK
9	Vovó Tartaruga	"Garota Nota 100 (Te Cuida, Meu Bem)" by MC Marcinho	Vai na Fé	undisclosed	14%	SAFE

=== Week 7 (March 5) ===
Performances on the seventh episode
#	Stage name	Song	Identity	Result	
1	Dinossauro	"Falta Você" by Thiaguinho	undisclosed	35%	RISK
2	DJ Vitória-Régia	"BONEKINHA" by Gloria Groove	undisclosed	65%	WIN
3	Vovó Tartaruga	"Ne me quitte pas" by Maysa	undisclosed	80%	WIN
4	Filtro de Barro	"Colombina" by Ed Motta	Richarlyson	20%	OUT
5	Galo	"Sorte" by Caetano Veloso and Gal Costa	undisclosed	68%	WIN
6	Capivara	"Melhor Sozinha" by Luísa Sonza	undisclosed	32%	RISK
7	Abelha-Rainha	"I Can See Clearly Now" by Jimmy Cliff	undisclosed	71%	WIN
8	Coruja	"Mulher de Fases" by Raimundos	undisclosed	29%	RISK

=== Week 8 (March 12) ===
Performances on the eighth episode
#	Stage name	Song	Identity	Result	
1	Capivara	"Beijinho no Ombro" by Valesca Popozuda	undisclosed	05%	RISK
2	Galo	"A Namorada" by Carlinhos Brown/"O Descobridor dos Sete Mares" by Tim Maia	undisclosed	17%	SAFE
3	Coruja	"Zé do Caroço" by Seu Jorge	undisclosed	07%	RISK
4	Vovó Tartaruga	"Despacito" by Luis Fonsi	undisclosed	13%	SAFE
5	Abelha-Rainha	"Não Deixe o Samba Morrer" by Alcione	undisclosed	19%	SAFE
6	Dinossauro	"Isso Aqui Tá Bom Demais" by Dominguinhos	undisclosed	10%	SAFE
7	DJ Vitória-Régia	"Diamonds" by Rihanna	undisclosed	29%	SAFE
Duel			Identity	Result	
8	Capivara	"Pesadão" by IZA feat. Marcelo Falcão	Solange Couto	OUT	
8	Coruja	"Pesadão" by IZA feat. Marcelo Falcão	undisclosed	SAFE	

=== Week 9 (March 19) ===
- Theme: Eduardo Sterblitch's Dance Challenge

Performances on the ninth episode
#	Stage name	Song	Style	Identity	Result	
1	DJ Vitória-Régia	"Espumas ao Vento" by Fagner	Tango	undisclosed	49%	RISK
2	Vovó Tartaruga	"Tocando em Frente" by Almir Sater	Waltz	undisclosed	51%	WIN
3	Coruja	"Desafio" by Harmonia do Samba	Pagode Baiano	Babu Santana	35%	OUT
4	Galo	"Cerol Na Mão" by Bonde do Tigrão	Funk Carioca	undisclosed	65%	WIN
5	Dinossauro	"Chorando Se Foi (Lambada)" by Kaoma	Lambada	undisclosed	29%	RISK
6	Abelha-Rainha	"Proud Mary" by Creedence Clearwater Revival	Rock	undisclosed	71%	WIN

=== Week 10 (March 26) ===
- Theme: Movies

Performances on the tenth episode
#	Stage name	Song	Film	Identity	Result	
1	Galo	"Footloose" by Kenny Loggins	Footloose	undisclosed	19%	RISK
2	DJ Vitória-Régia	"My Heart Will Go On" by Céline Dion	Titanic	undisclosed	35%	SAFE
3	Dinossauro	"Aqui no Mar (Under the Sea)" by Alan Menken	The Little Mermaid	undisclosed	10%	RISK
4	Abelha-Rainha	"My Power" by Beyoncé/"No Woman, No Cry" by Bob Marley & The Wailers	The Lion King/Black Panther: Wakanda Forever	undisclosed	22%	SAFE
5	Vovó Tartaruga	"Oh, Pretty Woman" by Roy Orbison	Pretty Woman	undisclosed	14%	RISK
Duel			Film	Identity	Result	
6	Dinossauro	"Tico-Tico no Fubá" by Carmen Miranda	Saludos Amigos	Mano Walter	OUT	
6	Galo	"Tico-Tico no Fubá" by Carmen Miranda	Saludos Amigos	undisclosed	SAFE	
6	Vovó Tartaruga	"Tico-Tico no Fubá" by Carmen Miranda	Saludos Amigos	undisclosed	SAFE	

=== Week 11 (April 2) ===
- Theme: Celebrity Duets

Performances on the eleventh episode
#	Stage name	Song	Duet partner	Identity	Result	
1	Abelha-Rainha	"Até Que Durou" by Péricles	Péricles	undisclosed	SAFE	
2	Vovó Tartaruga	"Vontade de Morder" by Simone & Simaria & Zé Felipe	Simone Mendes	undisclosed	SAFE	
3	DJ Vitória-Régia	"Sobrevivi" by Gloria Groove & Priscilla Alcantara	Priscilla Alcantara	undisclosed	SAFE	
4	Galo	"Dengo" by João Gomes	João Gomes	undisclosed	SAFE	
Smackdown				Identity	Result	
5	Abelha-Rainha	"At Last" by Etta James		undisclosed	58%	WIN
6	Vovó Tartaruga	"Malandragem" by Cássia Eller		Nanda Costa	42%	OUT
7	DJ Vitória-Régia	"All by Myself" by Eric Carmen		undisclosed	48%	RISK
8	Galo	"Vermelho" by Gloria Groove		undisclosed	52%	WIN

=== Week 12 (April 9) – Finale ===
Performances on the twelfth and final episode
#	Stage name	Song	Identity	Result	
1	Abelha-Rainha	"(You Make Me Feel Like) A Natural Woman" by Aretha Franklin	undisclosed	SAFE	
2	Galo	"Paparico"/"Samba Diferente" by Molejo	undisclosed	SAFE	
3	DJ Vitória-Régia	"I Wanna Dance With Somebody" by Whitney Houston	undisclosed	SAFE	
Smackdown
1	Abelha-Rainha	"A Mulher do Fim do Mundo"/"A Carne" by Elza Soares	Larissa Luz	34%	RUNNER-UP
2	Galo	"Only You" by The Platters	Xamã	29%	THIRD
3	DJ Vitória-Régia	"Rise Up" by Andra Day	Flay	37%	WINNER

== Ratings and reception ==
=== Brazilian ratings ===
All numbers are in points and provided by Kantar Ibope Media.

Episode	Air date	Timeslot (BRT)	SP viewers (in points)	Source
0	January 15, 2023	Sunday 3:45 p.m.	10.1	
1	January 22, 2023	Sunday 3:45 p.m.	9.3	
2	January 29, 2023	Sunday 3:45 p.m.	12.7	
3	February 5, 2023	Sunday 3:45 p.m.	11.3	
4	February 12, 2023	Sunday 3:45 p.m.	11.5	
5	February 19, 2023	Sunday 3:15 p.m.	11.0	
6	February 26, 2023	Sunday 3:45 p.m.	10.2	
7	March 5, 2023	Sunday 3:45 p.m.	11.1	
8	March 12, 2023	Sunday 3:45 p.m.	10.5	
9	March 19, 2023	Sunday 3:45 p.m.	11.1	
10	March 26, 2023	Sunday 3:45 p.m.	11.3	
11	April 2, 2023	Sunday 3:45 p.m.	10.8	
12	April 9, 2023	Sunday 3:45 p.m.	10.9	

- In 2023, each point represents 268.083 households in 15 market cities in Brazil (76.953 households in São Paulo).
