= Dona Beja =

Brazilian Historical Figure

Ana Jacinta de São José
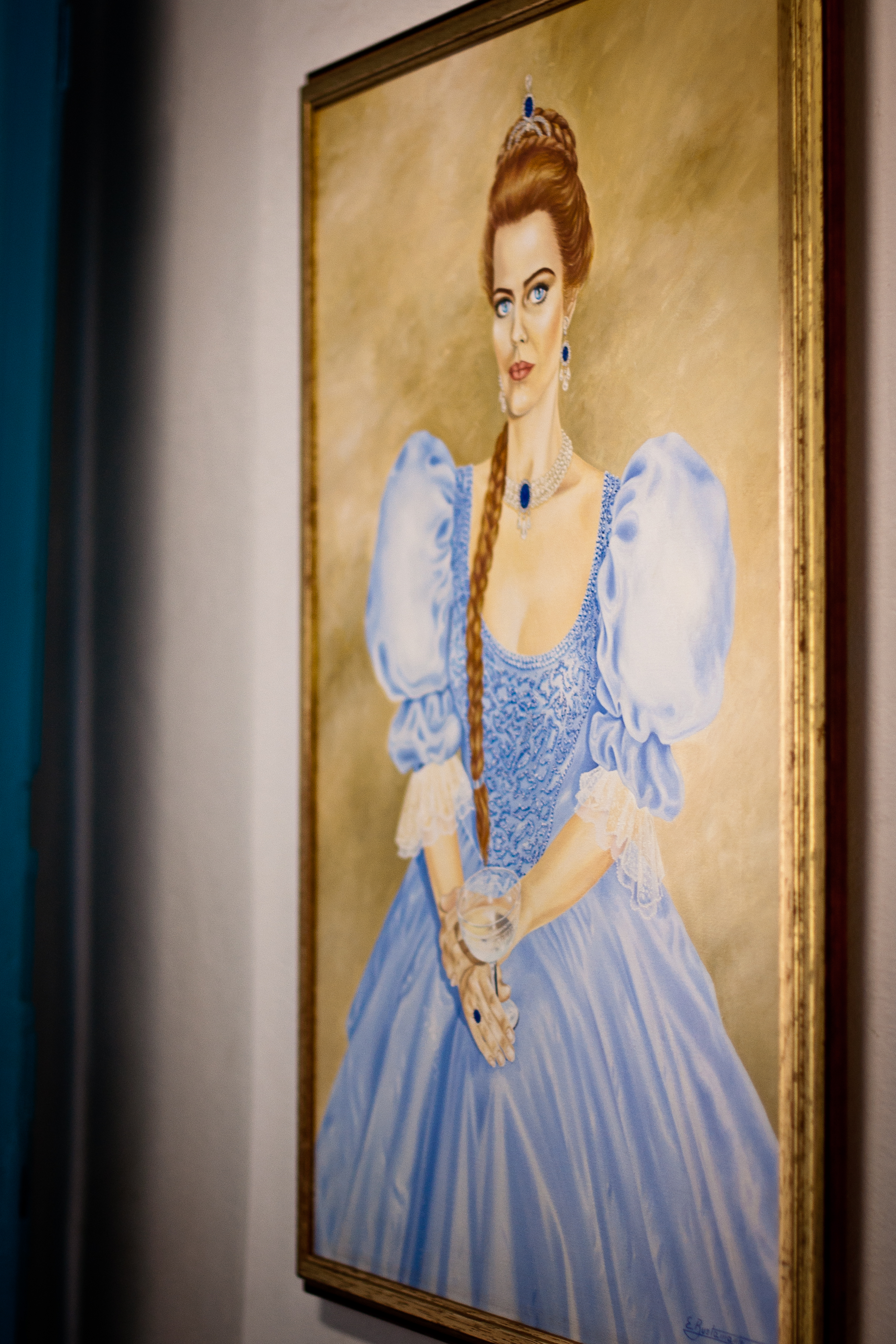
- Portrait of Ana Jacinta de São José inside the Dona Beja Museum, Araxà
- Born: January 2, 1800
- Died: December 20, 1873 (aged 73); Estrela do Sul
- Other name: Dona Beja

Ana Jacinta de São José, known as Dona Beja ( January 2, 1800, December 20, 1873 ) was a Brazilian historical personality in the 19th century, who had been known to be influential in the region of Araxá, Minas Gerais, Brazil.

== Biography ==
Ana arrived in Araxá with her mother and grandfather in 1805. While attaining youth, Ana's beauty is known to cause envy in other women. It is said, throughout her life, Dona Beja, as she became known, irritated women and enchanted men. She met farmer Manoel Fernando Sampaio (Antonio), her catechism colleague before she was abducted and forcibly for taken to Paracatu, with whom she ended up having a long relationship years later. She received the nickname “Beja” from her grandmother as she compared it to the sweetness and beauty of the “kiss” flower.

In 1815, she was kidnapped by the King's ombudsman, Joaquim Inácio Silveira da Motta, who had been fascinated by her beauty. His grandfather ended up getting killed by the ombudsman while trying to avoid her abduction. For two years, Beja lived as a lover of the ombudsman in Vila do Paracatu do Príncipe. After that, she returned to Rio de Janeiro at the request of Dom João VI. Upon arriving in Araxá, she faced a hostile environment. Conservative local society did not agree to see her as a victim, but as a seductive woman with questionable behavior and the women of the city considered it a great risk to the ethical values of the time. She decided to set up a brothel while facing such situations and named it as Chácara do Jatobá. At her brothel, one day Antonio invaded and consummated with Beja and consequently she gave birth to a gild child. Beja then decided to leave Araxá with her daughter in the year 1853. During the rest of her life she stayed at Estrela do Sul and its known that she made a fortune by trading gold and diamond. On December 20, 1873, she died of nephritis and was buried in a coffin decorated with zinc, which is suspected to have been found in June 2011, during an excavation for the construction of a fountain in Estrela do Sul, where there was the old cemetery. There is a museum in her name, Dona Beja Museum situated in Araxá.

== In popular culture ==
The 1986 Brazilian telenovela Dona Beija, directed by Herval Rossano, was written by Wilson Aguiar Filho and based on Beja's life events. Maitê Proença portrays Beja in this telenovela. Dona Beija was produced by Rede Manchete and its musical scores were directed by Wagner Tiso.

In 2010, the Colombian remake Doña Bella was produced by Telefutura, starring Zharick León in the title role.

Beja was also portrayed by Grazi Massafera in the 2026 HBO Brasil television miniseries Dona Beja.

== Notes ==
- Alvim, M. L., Pedrosa, J. (1979). Romanceiro de Dona Beja. Brazil: Fontana.
- Duguid, J. (1968). Pleasures of the spa; Pan Am's guide to the great health resorts of the world. New York: Macmillan.
- D'Eça, F. L. (1977). The Diary of a Foreign Service Wife: (assignment to Brazil). United States: W. S. Sullwold Pub.
- Nossa história. (2005). Brazil: Biblioteca Nacional.
