= Graduados (disambiguation) =

Graduados was an Argentine telenovela. It had several remakes:

- Graduados, historias que no se olvidan, in Chile
- Graduados (Colombian TV series), in Colombia
