= Zharick León =

Colombian actress and model

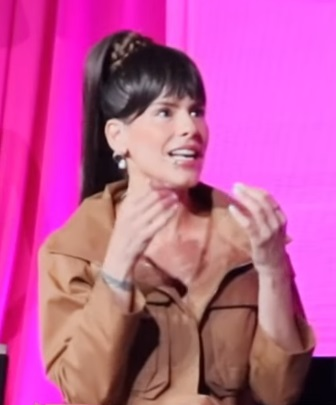
- León in 2024
- Born: Zharick Andrea León Villalba; 17 November 1976 (age 49); Cartagena, Colombia
- Education: Pontifical Xavierian University
- Occupations: Actress; Model
- Years active: 1997-present
- Height: 1.73 m (5 ft 8 in)
- Spouses: Martín Karpan (m. 2007; div. 2009) Nicolás Reyes (m. 2010; div. 2011)
- Partner: José Rodrigo Bonilla (2013-2016)
- Children: 2

Zharick Andrea León Villalba (born 17 November 1976) is a Colombian actress and model. She is known for her modeling work and portrayal of characters in Doña Bella, Pasión de Gavilanes, and for her leading role in Los Ajenos Fútbol Club and Decisiones: Unos ganan, otros pierden.

== Biography ==
Zharick Andrea León Villalba was born on 17 November 1976 in Cartagena, Colombia. Her father is part of the United States Marine Corps. She grew up in a house with military discipline. From a young age, she became familiar with weapons, self-defense movements, Martial arts, and Kung fu. At the age of 17, she left Cartagena to move to Bogotá, combining modeling with studies in Social Communication and Journalism at the Pontifical Xavierian University.

== Personal life ==
In 2008, she gave birth to the couple's first child Luciano Karpan León with the Argentine Actor, Martín Karpan, whom she met in the recordings of La viuda de Blanco in 2007. They took separate ways in 2009.

In 2010, she married the Colombian commercial television producer, Nicolás Reyes. The ceremony was a shamanic ritual, on the grounds of the Tayrona National Natural Park in the Sierra Nevada de Santa Marta. The celebration lasted 15 days and only twelve people were invited. The couple divorced in February 2011.

Upon completion of her work in Graduados she decided to take a break and travel continuously with her son Luciano. In this period, León decided to attend a Yoga workshop in the Tayrona National Natural Park in the Magdalena Department, Colombia, where she met the Mexican yoga instructor and businessman, José Rodrigo Bonilla. In 2014, she gave birth to her second child and first child with Bonilla, whom they called Levana Bonilla León. The couple broke up in 2016.

== Career ==
=== Modeling career ===
She started out as a model in her teenage years. Felipe Eljach convinced her to compete in La Chica Águila, where she obtained first place.

The opportunity on television came when she was part of a modeling agency, and she was chosen to present the Non Plus Ultra magazine.

In 2004, she appeared on the cover of Colombian magazine SoHo.

By the end of 2005, she traveled to Spain again, and posed on the cover of the men's magazine Interviú.

=== Television career ===
They proposed to her the interpretation of a character in the series Hombres. Later, she went to a casting in which she was requested and got the role of Carolina in Dos mujeres.

In 2003, she went to Miami, Florida to audition for the role of the provocative singer Rosario Montes in the Colombian series Pasión de Gavilanes.

In 2004, she starred in the novel Dora, la celadora.

In 2005, she co-starred in El baile de la Vida. In April of the same year, it was presented at the Plaza de Artes y Oficios of the Parque Forestal of Guayaquil, Ecuador, where thousands of people came to observe it.

Frontera 2006 to 2007, she was the antagonist of the television series La viuda de Blanco with Itatí Cantoral and Francisco Gattorno.

From 2007 to 2008, she was the protagonist of the television series Sobregiro de amor.

In 2010, she was the protagonist of the television series Doña Bella with Fabián Ríos, Marcelo Buquet and Stephanie Cayo.

From 2010 to 2011, she was part of the cast of the television series La Pola.

In 2021, it is confirmed that the actress will give life to Rosario Montes in Pasión de Gavilanes 2.

== Filmography ==
=== Television ===
| Year | Title | Character | Channel | Notes |
|---|---|---|---|---|
| 1997-1998 | Dos mujeres | Carolina Urdaneta | Canal 1 | 200 episodes |
| 1998-1999 | Amor en forma | Victoria | Canal 1 | 3 episodes |
| 1999-2000 | Me llaman Lolita | Margarita "Margara" | RCN Televisión | 198 episodes |
| 2000-2001 | Adónde va Soledad | Soledad Rivas | RCN Televisión | 117 episodes |
| 2003 | No renuncies Salomé | Laura | RCN Televisión | 140 episodes |
| 2003–2022 | Pasión de Gavilanes | Rosario Montes | Telemundo / Caracol Televisión | Main cast |
| 2004 | Dora, la celadora | Dora "La celadora" Lara | Caracol Televisión | 122 episodes |
| 2005-2006 | El baile de la vida | Lina Forero | Caracol Televisión | 171 episodes |
| 2006-2007 | La viuda de Blanco | Iluminada Urbina | Telemundo | 158 episodes |
| 2007-2008 | Sobregiro de amor | Liliana Herrera | Caracol Televisión | 78 episodes |
| 2010 | Doña Bella | Bella "Doña Bella" de Santa Lucía Cepeda | RCN Televisión | 88 episodes |
| 2010-2011 | La Pola | Catarina Salavarrieta | RCN Televisión | 112 episodes |
| 2012 | La ruta blanca | Sara Mendoza | Cadenatres | 92 episodes |
| 2013 | La promesa | Luz Miriam / Alias Indira | Caracol Televisión | 60 episodes |
| 2013-2014 | Graduados | Jimena Rocha Rosales / Patricia Delgado de Vallejo | RCN Televisión | 257 episodes |
| 2016-2017 | La ley del corazón | Marcela de Segura | RCN Televisión | Special Guest |
| 2018 | Garzón vive | Yolanda "Tuto" Meneses | RCN Televisión | 90 episodes |
| 2019 | Decisiones: Unos ganan, otros pierden | Margarita | Telemundo | Episode 12: "Regalo de vida" |
| 2020 | Operación pacífico | Fabiola | Telemundo | Special Guest |
| 2020 | Vidas posibles | Juana Hernández | | |
| 2023 | Romina poderosa | Virginia Vélez | Caracol Televisión | 53 episodes |
| 2024-present | Betty, la fea: la historia continúa | María José "Majo" Arriaga López | Amazon Prime Video | 30 episodes |

=== Movies ===
| Year | Movie | Character | Director |
|---|---|---|---|
| 2009 | Alborada carmesí | Natalia Bustamante | Luis Hernán Reina |
| 2019 | Los Ajenos Fútbol Club | Martina Ibáñez | Juan Camilo Pinzón |
| 2022 | Que Las Hay... Las Hay | | Gonzalo Londono |
