= Madam Beja =

2026 Brazilian telenovela

- Brazilian Portuguese: Dona Beja
- Genre: Telenovela
- Based on: Dona Beija by Wilson Aguiar Filho
- Developed by: António Barreira; Renata Jhin; Daniel Berlinsky
- Written by: Maria Clara Mattos; Cecília Giannetti; Clara Anastácia; Ceci Alves
- Directed by: Hugo de Sousa; Bia Coelho; João Bolthauser; Rogério Sagui; Thiago Teitelroit
- Starring: Grazi Massafera; David Junior; André Luiz Miranda; Indira Nascimento; Bianca Bin; Erika Januza; Thalma de Freitas; Bukassa Kabengele; Deborah Evelyn
- Opening theme: "Blues da Piedade" by Larissa Luz
- Country of origin: Brazil
- Original language: Portuguese
- No. of seasons: 1
- No. of episodes: 40

Production
- Production company: Floresta Produções

Original release
- Network: HBO Max
- Release: 2 February – 23 March 2026

Madam Beja (Portuguese: Dona Beja) is a Brazilian telenovela developed by Renata Jhin, António Barreira and Daniel Berlinsky. It is based on the 1986 telenovela Dona Beija, written by Wilson Aguiar Filho. The telenovela stars Grazi Massafera, David Junior, André Luiz Miranda, Indira Nascimento, Bianca Bin, Erika Januza, Thalma de Freitas, Bukassa Kabengele and Deborah Evelyn. It premiered on HBO Max on 2 February 2026.

== Plot ==
In 1815, in the city of Araxá, lives Beja, a young woman of breathtaking beauty, yet also a dreamer, a romantic, and full of hope. Orphaned of her mother and abandoned by her father before she was even born, she grows up under the care of her grandfather, José Alves, an honest man who instills in her values of freedom and dignity. Beja dreams of a simple life, driven by the love she feels for Antônio, her one true love, with whom she believes she will marry and build a family. The tranquility of her life is brutally shattered when her grandfather is murdered by Ouvidor Motta, the provincial governor, while attempting to prevent his granddaughter from being kidnapped. Fascinated by Beja's beauty, Motta abducts her and takes her far away from her hometown, separating her from Antônio and destroying her dreams.

During an escape, Beja manages to secretly return to Araxá, where she discovers, through a cruel lie orchestrated by the envious and malicious Maria, that Antônio has married Angélica. Convinced that she has been abandoned and lacking the strength to face the past, Beja decides not to return to her hometown and comes to believe that her destiny lies in marrying Motta. Meanwhile, Antônio, believing that Beja has abandoned him, ends up entering into a relationship with Angélica under pressure from his mother, Ceci, a cold and manipulative woman who has always done everything in her power to keep him away from Beja. As the years pass, Beja undergoes a transformation. The dreamy young woman gives way to a strong, intelligent, and strategic woman. Kept as a wife by Motta, she amasses wealth and influence through relationships with other powerful men, who shower her with jewels, land, and prestige.

When Motta is promoted and joins the Court, Beja believes she will finally gain recognition and freedom. However, he refuses to bring her there officially, keeping her hidden away as a mistress. Feeling used and betrayed once again, Beja decides to take action. With the help of her faithful servant Severina, Beja devises an elaborate corruption scheme that directly implicates the Emperor. The plan results in Motta's arrest and the annulment of their marriage. Free for the first time, Beja finally breaks the chains that have bound her since youth and embraces her destiny as an independent, powerful woman—a woman who is truly her own master.

Upon returning to Araxá and being cruelly shunned by its conservative society, Beja suffers a devastating blow when she confirms that Antônio has indeed married someone else. Beja resolves to transform her pain into audacity, founding the sophisticated Chácara do Jatobá, a luxurious and exclusive venue where she hosts the region's most influential men for unique evenings marked by refinement, seduction, and lavish payments. The scandal spreads rapidly among the traditional families, who view Beja's enterprise as a direct affront to the prevailing moral code. Nevertheless, this select gentlemen's club becomes an absolute triumph, elevating her to the status of a prestigious courtesan and a figure of immense political and social influence. While women such as Ceci, Genoveva, and Augusta, alongside the powerful Colonel Elias, spearhead a smear campaign to destroy her, Beja demonstrates that she knows how to play the game of power with shrewd intelligence.

== Cast ==
- Grazi Massafera as Ana Jacinta de São José "Dona Beja"
  - Ana Carolina Leite as child Beja
- David Junior as Antônio Sampaio
  - Levi Asaf as child Antônio
- André Luiz Miranda as João Mendonça
  - Kauã Torres as child João
- Pedro Fasanaro as Severina Andrade
- Bianca Bin as Angélica Sampaio
  - Sofia Fornazari as child Angélica
- Deborah Evelyn as Cecília "Ceci" Sampaio
  - Ana Thomé as young Ceci
- Indira Nascimento as Maria Sampaio
  - Duda Bernardo as child Maria
- Bukassa Kabengele as Colonel Paulo Sampaio
- Otávio Müller as Jorge da Costa Pinto
- Kelzy Ecard as Augusta da Costa Pinto
- Tuca Andrada as Colonel Felizardo Sampaio
- Isabela Garcia as Genoveva Sampaio
- Werner Schünemann as Colonel Francisco Botelho
- Thalma de Freitas as Josefa Mendonça
- Luciano Quirino as José Mendonça
- Erika Januza as Cândida "Candinha" da Serra
- Gabriel Godoy as Honorato / Inácio
- Catharina Caiado as Carmem "Carminha" da Costa Pinto
- Ricardo Burgos as Joaquim Botelho "Botelhinho"
- Lucas Winkhaus as Avelino Montes
- João Villa as Fortunato Sampaio
- Rita Pereira as Acácia Lisboa "Siá Boa"
- Simone Mazzer as Dorotéia Rodrigues
- Isabelle Nassar as Olívia Almeida
- Nikolas Antunes as Clariovaldo "Valdo" Pereira
- Dudu Pelizzari as Deputy Maurício Belgar
- Arilson Lucas as Father Aranha Gomes
  - Thiago Rayol as child Aranha
- Miguel Rômulo as Father Otávio Ribeiro
- Danielle Olímpia as Joana Mendonça
- Manuela Dourado as Tereza Sampaio
- Paulo Mendes as Vicente da Costa Pinto
- George Sauma as Januário Gonçalves
- Bruna Spínola as Eulália Souza
- Bruno Suzano as Alcides Ferreiro
- Arthur Alavarse as Rômulo Batista

=== Guest stars ===
- Virgílio Castelo as Ouvidor Joaquim da Motta
- Roberto Bomtempo as Alves
- Joana Solnado as Maria Bernarda Alves
- Elisa Lucinda as Flaviana Sampaio
- Elizabeth Savala as Madame Constance
- Lúcia Veríssimo as Mother Idalina Botelho
- Othon Bastos as Judge
- Marcello Escorel as Father Melo Franco
- Fábio de Luca as Colonel Tenório Madeira
- Lucinha Lins as Miss Callen
- Jaime Leibovitch as Father Jaime
- Luiz Henrique Nogueira as Domingos Junqueira
- Paulo Giardini as Eliseu
- Cauã Martins as Heitor
- Pedro Carvalho as Dom Pedro I
- Manuela Duarte as Gracia
- Cláudio Mendes as Juca
- Luiz Sérgio Navarro as Andrade
- Carol Rainatto as Empress Leopoldina
- Vandré Silveira as Moacir
- Henrique Sganzerla as Dom Pedro II
- Fernando Sampaio as Police Officer

== Production ==
In September 2021, Floresta acquired the rights the 1986 telenovela Dona Beija. António Barreira, an International Emmy Award-winning Portuguese writer, was tasked with penning the adaptation, basing it on the original scripts by Wilson Aguiar Filho. Initially, Barreira was set to work with Renata Jhin on developing the scripts. However, on 28 May 2022, Jhin stepped down from the project due to her inability to balance her workload and was replaced by Daniel Berlinsky.

The adaptation was officially commissioned and announced by Max in March 2023 during a panel at the Rio2C event. On 11 August 11 2023, Floresta Produções and HBO decided that the telenovela would be titled Dona Beja, the courtesan's real name, but that it would retain the same script as the original work, with modifications. Filming began on 11 October 2023.

== Release ==
Madam Beja premiered on 2 February 2026, with five new episodes being released weekly until 23 March 2026. The telenovela made its broadcast television premiere on Band on 5 March 2026.
