= La hipocondríaca =

- Genre: Tragicomedy
- Written by: Ana María Parra Vásquez; Catalina Coy
- Directed by: Juan Camilo Pinzón; Juan Carlos Delgado; Víctor Cantillo
- Starring: Stephanie Cayo; Ernesto Calzadilla; John Alex Toro; Cristina Campuzano
- Opening theme: La hipocondríaca by Stephanie Cayo
- Country of origin: Colombia
- Original language: Spanish
- No. of episodes: 120

Production
- Producers: Manuel Peñaloza; Danna Cunningham; Verónica Pimstein
- Production locations: Bogotá and Cartagena, Colombia

Original release
- Network: Caracol Television
- Release: April 2 – September 27, 2013

La hipocondríaca (English: The Hypochondriac) is a 2013 Colombian telenovela produced and broadcast by Caracol Television.

== Cast ==
- Stephanie Cayo - Macarena González
- Ernesto Calzadilla - Alejandro Pulido
- Cristina Campuzano - Camila Santos
- John Alex Toro - Juan Jhon "JJ"
- Maria Cecilia Botero - Maruja Maldonado de Pulido
- Kepa Amuchastegui - Alfonso Pulido
- Nicolás Montero - Pedro Pulido
- Alberto León Jaramillo - Francisco Gonzalez "Tio Pacho"
- Marcela Benjumea - Esther
- Julio César Herrera - Mario Herrera
- Margarita Amado - Matilde
- Ernesto Ballen - Jimmy
- Bebsabe Duque - Gina González
- Marilyn Patiño - Luz Elvira
- Leonardo Acosta - Leonardo
- Laura Torres - Juliana Pulido
- Ignacio Hijuelos - Carlos Bejarano
- Héctor Ulloa - Avellaneda
- Marcela Agudelo - Marcela Bufano
- Nicole Santamaría - Cecilia Bustos
- Ilja Rosendahl - Diego
- Juan Sebastian Caicedo - Javier
- Alma Rodriguez - Rosaura González
- Rita Bendeck - Sandra Romero
- Lina Tejeiro - Tatiana
- Stefanía Gómez - Linda Rosa
- Consuelo Moure - Adela
- Victor Cifuentes - Dr. Consuegra
- Walther Luengas - Albeiro Manrique
- Julián Díaz - "Tumaco"
- Andrés Salazar - Lolo
- Gerly Hassam Gómez - Patricio
- Nayra Castillo - Luisa
- César Alvarez - Bocadillo
- German "Tuto" Patiño - Dr. Ignacio
- Astrid Junguito - Herminia
- Michelle Manterola

== Awards and nominations ==
=== Promax Latinoamérica 2013 ===
Year	Category	Recipient	Result
2013	Best promotion telenovela	La hipocondríaca	Won

=== Premios Clic Caracol ===
Year	Category	Recipient	Result
2013	Best production	La hipocondríaca	Pending
2013	Best actor	Ernesto Calzadilla	Pending
