= Como caído del cielo =

- Directed by: José Pepe Bojórquez
- Screenplay by: José Pepe Bojórquez; Alfredo Felix-Díaz
- Based on: a play and screenplay by Toby Campion
- Starring: Omar Chaparro
- Cinematography: Chris Chomyn
- Music by: Jorge Avendaño; Benjamin Shwartz
- Production companies: Caldera/De Fanti Entertainment; Esparza Caldera Entertainment; La Victoria Films; Netflix
- Distributed by: Netflix
- Release date: 24 December 2019 (Mexico)
- Country: Mexico
- Language: Spanish

Como caído del cielo (As if Fallen from Heaven) is a Mexican comedy film directed by José Pepe Bojórquez, from a screenplay by Bojórquez and Alfredo Félix-Díaz, based on a play and screenplay by Toby Campion The film is inspired on the life of the Mexican popular singer Pedro Infante but focuses more on Pedro Guadalupe Ramos (Omar Chaparro), an impersonator of Infante. It is an original Netflix production and was released on 24 December 2019.

== Plot ==
Pedro Infante has been detained in limbo for the past 60 years. Without permission to go to heaven, because he was a womanizer, he cannot be sent to hell either because he has also done much good. Pedro Infante prays for a second chance and is granted only one: he will be sent to Earth in the body of an imitator, Pedro Guadalupe Ramos (Omar Chaparro) and if he manages to straighten his life, he will be allowed to go to heaven. When he opens his eyes on the body of the impersonator, Pedro Infante falls in love at first sight with Raquel (Ana Claudia Talancón), Pedro Guadalupe's wife. But earning heaven will not be so easy since Pedro Guadalupe has followed in the footsteps of his idol and had been cheating on Raquel with her cousin Samantha (Stephanie Cayo). He will have to do whatever it takes to prove that he is a new man, reconquer Raquel and avoid falling into any temptation, because a single false move could send him straight to hell.

== Cast ==
- Omar Chaparro as Pedro Infante / Pedro Guadalupe Ramos
- Ana Claudia Talancón as Raquel
- Manuel "Flaco" Ibáñez as Silvano
- Stephanie Cayo as Samantha
- Angélica María as herself
- Yare Santana as Jenny
- Guy Nae as Richard Zapata
- Lupita Sandoval as Oficial L. Haro
- Marco Treviño as Alcalde
- Victor Franco as Comandante
