= Juan Pablo Espinosa =

Colombian actor

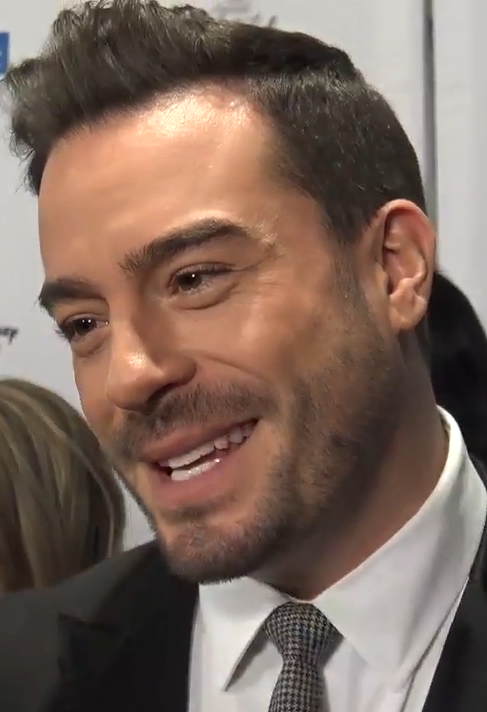
- Espinosa in July 2017
- Born: Juan Pablo Espinosa Cuéllar; October 28, 1980 (age 45); Bogotá, Colombia
- Occupation: Actor
- Years active: 2005–present

Juan Pablo Espinosa Cuéllar (born 28 October 1980 in Bogotá) is a Colombian actor.

== Biography ==
After graduating from Gimnasio Moderno high-school in Bogotá, Espinosa went to study acting at Boston's Emerson College. He also lived in New York City and Los Angeles, before returning to Colombia in 2004. In 2005, he debuted in Colombian television at Caracol TV daily anthology series Tu voz estéreo. Later, he appeared in RCN TV telenovelas Merlina, mujer divina and Floricienta; after a break, he became part of the ensemble cast of El último matrimonio feliz and of the Colombian theatre version of Closer. In 2009, he participated in the first season of Sony Pictures Television and Caracol TV series Los caballeros las prefieren brutas, and on A corazón abierto, a RCN TV series based on Grey's Anatomy. He would return to Caracol TV for a supporting role on Secretos de familia and as a star on El secretario.

In June 2019, he came out as gay.

== Television roles ==
Title	Year	Role	Notes
Tu voz estéreo	2005–2007	Alejo Quiñones	Lead role
El último matrimonio feliz	2008–2009	Carlos Alberto García	Co-lead role
Los caballeros las prefieren brutas	2010	Eduardo Santodomingo	Recurring role, 22 episodes
Secretos de familia	2010	Camilo Rincón	Recurring role
A corazón abierto	2010–2011	Augusto Maza	6 episodes
El secretario	2011	Emilio Romero García	Lead role
Secretos del paraíso	2013	Cristóbal Soler	Lead role
Narcos	2015	Luis Carlos Galán	2 episodes
La Fan	2017	Lucas Duarte	Lead role
Noches con Platanito	2017	Himself	Episode: "Juan Pablo Espinoza/Gloria Peralta/Pepi Sonuga/Kevin Fonteyne/Jonatan Sánchez"
Cocaine Godmother	2017	Alberto Bravo	Television film
Acapulco	2021	Rodolfo	Episode: "Crazy Little Thing Called Love"
