= Erika Januza =

Brazilian actress and model

Érika Januza
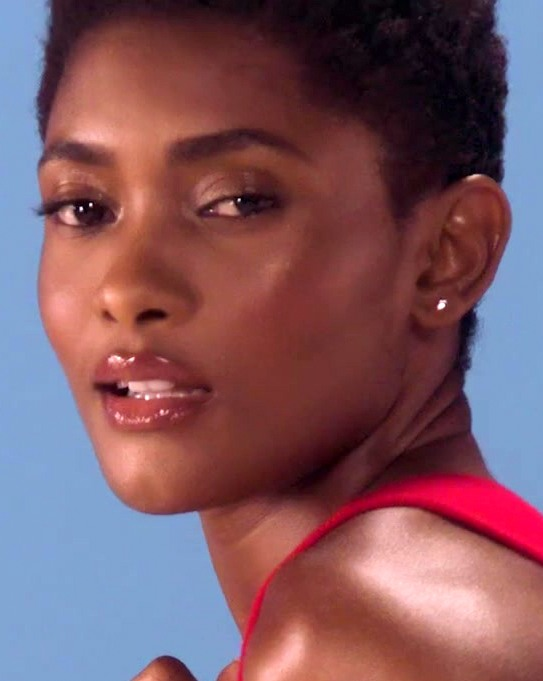
- Januza in 2020
- Born: Érika Januza da Trindade Gomes; 7 May 1985 (age 41); Contagem, Minas Gerais, Brazil
- Occupations: Actress, model
- Years active: 2012–present

Érika Januza da Trindade Gomes (born 7 May 1985) is a Brazilian actress and model.

== Early life ==
Érika Januza was born as the only child of a single mother. During her youth, she took part in many beauty contests and acting auditions. Although she always held the aspiration to be a model and actress on television, she initially worked as a school teacher.

Januza is a devout Roman Catholic, and credits her faith to getting her through the COVID pandemic.

== Film career ==
In 2012 Januza was chosen from 2,000 contestants to be the leading protagonist in the telenovia Suburbia directed by Luiz Fernando Carvalho and Paulo Lins. Since then she has appeared in multiple television programs, commercials and films.

== Allegations of discrimination ==
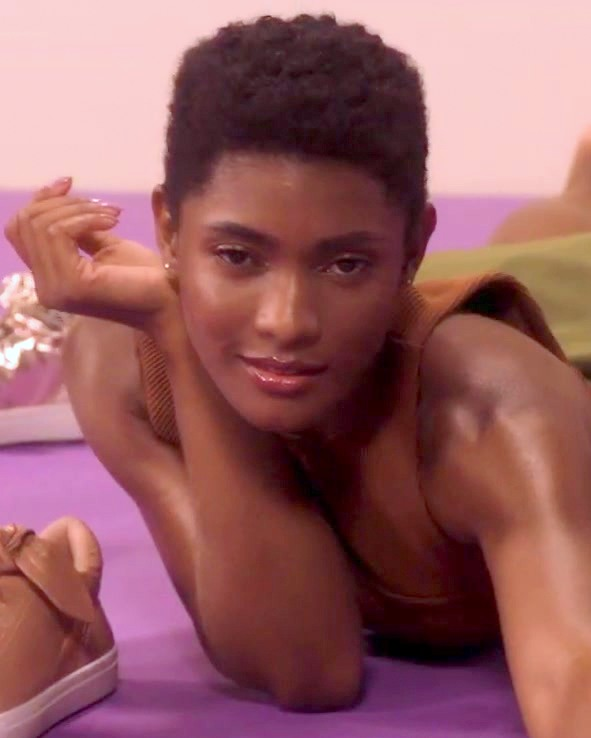
Januza in advertising campaign.

Januza has said that early on in her career she was often looked down upon at auditions because of her Afro-Brazilian complexion and heritage. One time in her film career while arriving on set the security guards would not let her in the studio because they did not believe that she was actually part of the cast.

== Filmography ==
=== Television ===
Year	Title	Role
2012	Suburbia	Conceição
2013	Copa Hotel	Kelly Madeira
2014	Em Família	Alice Machado Torres
2015	Saltibum	Herself (Reality Show)
2016	Os Suburbanos	Professora Rebecca
2016	Totalmente Demais	Vanessa
2016	Sol Nascente	Júlia
2017	O Outro Lado do Paraíso	Raquel Custódio
2018	Dança dos Famosos (season 15)	Herself (Contestant)
2019	Amor de Mãe	Marina
2020	Arcanjo Renegado	Sarah
2021	Verdades Secretas	Laila
2023	The Masked Singer Brasil (season 3)	Broco Lee
2023	A Magia de Aruna	Latifa
2025	Rainhas Além da Avenida	Presenter
2025	Saia Justa	Presenter
2026	Dona Beja	Candinha da Serra
2026	A Nobreza do Amor	Niara, Rainha de Batanga

=== Film ===
- 2016 - O Último Animal
- 2017 - The Movie of My Life as Tita
- 2024 - Biônicos as Helena
- 2025 - D.P.A. 4 - O Fantástico Reino de Ondion as Rainha Astúria
