= El secretario =

Colombian telenovela

- Genre: Sitcom; Telenovela
- Written by: Jörg Hiller; Claudia F. Sánchez; Catalina Coy
- Directed by: Juan Camilo Pinzón
- Starring: Juan Pablo Espinosa; Stephanie Cayo; Martín Karpan
- Theme music composer: Fabo Romero, Jimmy Pulido López
- Opening theme: Sólo tú (Jimmy Pulido)
- Composers: Fabo Romero, J. Pulido
- Country of origin: Colombia
- Original language: Spanish
- No. of episodes: 152 (Colombian broadcast, irregular running time); 123 x 1h (international version)

Production
- Executive producer: Juan Andrés Flórez
- Producer: Manuel Peñaloza
- Production location: Bogotá
- Camera setup: Multicamera

Original release
- Network: Caracol Televisión
- Release: 22 August 2011 – 30 March 2012

Related
- Porque el Amor Manda

El secretario (The Secretary) is a Colombian telenovela produced and broadcast by Caracol Televisión from August 22, 2011 to March 30, 2012.

== Plot ==
30-year-old Emilio Romero (Juan Pablo Espinosa) was living in New York City working as a pizza delivery guy, despite his background in finances. He finds out through a Facebook-like social network that he has a 6-year-old daughter in Bogotá, and decides to come back to Colombia, but he is broke. One of his clients (Hernán Méndez), who turns out to be a Gangster, pays his plane tickets with the condition of taking a suitcase full of clothes. When arriving to Bogotá, customs police find the suitcase has a double bottom packed with thousands of dollars. Romero co-operates with justice and is released under parole. He meets his daughter Valentina (Hillary Vergara), who lives with her mother and Emilio's ex-girlfriend Lorena (Helga Díaz) and her stepfather Franklin Sotomayor (Fernando Solórzano).

With no money in his pockets, Emilio managed to find a place to live: an apartment whose former tenant (Fabio Camero) is to be evicted. There he meets Gertrudis Dudis Buenahora (Margalida Castro), his new neighbour. Emilio also accepts (reluctantly at first, as he had applied to be an accounting assistant) a job as a secretary at Industrias Copito, a toilet paper company. His immediate bosses are Mario Segura (Fabián Mendoza), the operations manager and the owner's half-brother, and Antonia Fontalvo (Stephanie Cayo), the workaholic commercial manager and fiancée of Félix Segura (Martín Karpan), the company's owner. Félix has a clandestine affaire with Paola Zorrilla (Andrea López), Antonia's best friend.

As the only male secretary of the company, Emilio is mocked by the other secretaries and his male coworkers. Mario hates him because Antonia hired a male secretary in order to keep Mario's sexual instincts away from his former secretary, Yensi (Alexandra Serrano). Though loyal, optimistic, kind, and efficient, Emilio is clumsy and gets easily into trouble, specially with Félix; nevertheless, Antonia constantly defends him and stands by his side.

== Cast ==
- Juan Pablo Espinosa as Emilio Romero García, the secretary
- Stephanie Cayo as Antonia Toni Fontalvo, Industrias Copito's commercial manager, Emilio's boss, Félix's fiancée
- Martín Karpan as Félix Segura, Industrias Copito's owner, Antonia's fiancé
- Fabián Mendoza as Mario Segura, Industrias Copito's operations manager, Félix's half-brother, Emilio's boss
- Andrea López as Paola Zorrilla, Antonia's best friend, Félix's lover
- Hillary Vergara as Valentina Redín, Emilio and Lorena's daughter
- Helga Díaz as Lorena Redín, Valentina's mother, Emilio's ex-girlfriend
- Fernando Solórzano as Franklin Delano Sotomayor, advertising executive, Lorena's husband
- Margalida Castro as Gertrudis Dudis Buenahora, Emilio's neighbour
- María Margarita Giraldo as Delfina, Félix's secretary
- Valentina Lizcano as Olga Lucía Linares, secretary, interested in Emilio
- Alexandra Serrano as Yensi Catalina López Pereira, former secretary of Mario
- Andrea Nieto as Kelly Milady Díaz, secretary, secret lover of Patricio
- Sara Corrales as Lucila Janet Castillo, secretary (ep. 25-51)
- Walter Luengas as Patricio Conde, tax assistant
- Alberto Barrero as Álvaro Humberto Patequiva, auditory assistant
- Freddy Ordóñez as Julián Aguirre, accounting assistant
- Ricardo Vesga as Ernesto Castillo, human resources chief
- Hernán Méndez as Heriberto Cuéllar aka Don Omar, mafioso
- Fabio Camero as Pedro Dávalos, former tenant of Emilio's apartment (ep. 1)
- Margarita Amado as María Puentes, the attorney in charge of Don Omar's case (ep. 1, recurring from ep. 25)
- Nayra Castillo as Albita, Félix's maid
- Rosalba Pagotes as Flor, Lorena and Franklin's maid
- Jorge Bautista as Rodolfo, Copito's security guard
- Alfredo Cuéllar as Yamid, Antonia's pilates coach
- Rafael Uribe as Michael Jair Riaño, aka Sangre azul, head of a gang related to Don Ómar and Félix
- Ignacio Hijuelos as Jaime Acosta, Félix's lawyer, involved with Don Ómar
- Marcela Vargas as Valentina's therapist
- Alejandro Blandón as Eugenio, Copito's tech guy (ep. 6, 65, 74)
- Víctor Cifuentes as José Octavio Linares, Olga's father
- Humberto Arango as Patricio's father, a family lawyer
- Hugo Gómez as Alberto Ayala, foreign trade minister
- Nikol Sofía Díaz as Íngrid Ayala, Valentina's friend, foreign trade minister's daughter
- Rebeca López as Apolonia, Patequiva's wife (from ep. 72)
- Julián Orrego as Agobardo Manosalva, INPEC Félix's guardian (ep. 68-96)
- Yaneth Waldman as Gina, Mario's therapist (from ep. 71)
- Luis Fernando Salas as Nelson Moreno, Delfina's son, auditory assistant, replaces Patequiva (ep. 86-104)
- Liliana Escobar as Amalia, Valentina's teacher
- Carmenza González as Mario's mother (from ep. 131)
- Giorgio Difeo as Jacques, executive of a French company (ep. 8, 9, 140-148)
- Phillipe Laurent as an executive of a French company (ep. 8, 9)
- Jean Phillipe Conan as Phillipe, executive of a French company (ep. 140-148)
- Diego Ospina as a cab driver (ep. 7, 8, 9, 71, 73)
- Orlando Vásquez as Darío, Félix's guard
- Jorge de la Torre as Fermín Polanía, Antonia's plumber (ep. 10)
- Mario Jurado as an advertising executive at Industrias Copito (ep. 11, 12)
- Néstor Alfonso Rojas as Restrepo, Minister Ayala's bodyguard
- Rafael Pedroza as Tote, gang member
- Jhon Jairo Rodríguez as Bandola, gang member
- Manuel Vega as drunk manager of a club (ep. 20)
- Daniel Rocha as Father Lucas (ep. 21, 22, 54-58)
- Shirley Marulanda as a nurse (ep. 24)
- Alberto Bossio as a policeman (ep. 24)
- Eileen Moreno as Dora Méndez, Emilio's secretary at the trade ministry (ep. 25–33; 142-144)
- Oscar Salazar as César Aristizábal, Emilio's coworker at the trade ministry (ep. 25-33)
- Oscar Julián Beltrán as Camilo Turbay, Emilio's coworker at the trade ministry (ep. 25-33)
- Dorian Díaz as waiter at restaurant Las Castañuelas (ep. 23, 28)
- Germán Hernández as manager at restaurant Las Castañuelas (ep. 23, 28)
- Darwin Fuertes as Amaranto, the guard of the building where Paola lives
- Mauricio Goyeneche as a recycler (ep. 31)
- Jacob Isaza as a member of the congregation Lucila attends (ep. 32)
- Enrique Cabrera as a guard at the trade ministry (ep. 33)
- Arcenio Robelto as a policeman (ep. 33, 62, 63, 83, 93)
- Mario Cabrera as a policeman (ep. 33)
- Eyvar Fardy as Adolfo Ortiz, representative of a bank (ep. 34)
- Danilo Smith as a tailor at the boutique where Antonia buys her wedding dress (ep. 42)
- Margarita Reyes as minister Ayala's wife (ep. 47, 55-57)
- Fernando Corredor as Father Adolfo, a Catholic priest presiding a pre-wedding course (ep. 48)
- Irlán Rubio as a doctor at the hospital (ep. 49)
- Sandra Mendoza as a receptionist at the hospital (ep. 49)
- Josué Bernal as a guard at Antonia's house (ep. 52, 63)
- Diana Carolina Lindo as a receptionist at the hotel (ep. 55-57)
- Silvia Suárez as a news presenter (ep. 55-56)
- Carlos Fernando Medina as Torres, a member of the Attorney General's Office's CTI (ep. 57, 62, 63, 95)
- Alejandro Bendeck as a police official (ep. 58)
- Ángela Deantonio as a family judge (ep. 60, 61)
- Héctor Manuel Cruz as a taxi driver (ep. 61, 62)
- Marisol Galindo as a passer-by stumbling upon Dudis (ep. 62)
- Santiago Munévar as an INPEC guardian (ep. 64, 96)
- Sandra Jaimes as a psychologist treating Dudis (ep. 64)
- Paola Arenas as a television journalist (ep. 64)
- Luz Myriam Guarín as a supermarket customer (ep. 66)
- Morris Bravo as Giancarlo, Yensi's old friend, hired by Mario to kidnap Antonia (ep. 66, 67)
- Robin Pachón as an employee at an internet cafe (ep. 71)
- Fernanda Calderón as an employee at a hotel in Cartagena (ep. 71)
- David Osorio as Tadeo, meets Mario at a gay disco (ep. 72)
- Edgar Vittorino as John, meets Mario at a gay disco (ep. 72)
- Jhon Jairo Rodríguez as a guard at Mario's building (ep. 72, 73)
- Yesid Téllez as a thief (ep. 77, 83, 84)
- Fernando Lara as the leader of a mariachi band (ep. 77, 78)
- David Noreña as Camilo Rojas, a representative of a real estate company (ep. 81)
- Maya (Stephanie Cayo's dog) as Gina's pet (ep. 85)
- Enrique Poveda as the driver of a van where Emilio gets kidnapped (ep. 90, 95, 96, 97)
- Hernando Reyes as a member of the Attorney General's Office, the leader of the rescue operation for Emilio (ep. 95, 96)
- Germán Patiño as Lucio, boyfriend of Mario's mother (ep. 134-144)

== Music ==
The theme song is Solo tú, by in-house composers Fabo Romero and Jimmy Pulido López; the latter performs the song. Music by Afro-Colombian electronica band Systema Solar (Mi kolombia, Sin oficio, En los huesos) is featured in many episodes. In episode 12, most secretaries and the administrative area humiliate Emilio by performing a choreography with Daniela Romo's 1983 hit Pobre secretaria, which Emilio and Antonia sing in karaoke in episode 52. In episode 45, many Copito employees perform a choreography with Bomba Estéreo's 2008 hit Fuego. Vallenato singer Pipe Peláez appears on episode 72 singing a cappella Cuando quieras quiero; in the same episode Mario dances Kool and the Gang's Ladies Night. In episode 98, Tú by Stephanie Cayo is featured. Other songs already used by Caracol TV in other telenovelas, such as Ensamble's Otra vez (ep. 5), Adriana Bottina's Ya mi soledad (ep. 76) and Lucas Troo's Sin tu fe (ep. 29), are also featured.

== Reception ==
After watching the first episode, television critic Javier Santamaría stated that the telenovela is similar to other Caracol TV series such as Nuevo rico nuevo pobre and Clase ejecutiva and that it does not have anything "special;" he criticizes Argentine actor Martín Karpan but praises Espinosa for his "commitment and energy." Days later, his perception of the telenovela improved, praising its incidental music and stating that, since it is a comedy, it is "unavoidable" to see "caricatured characters."

Ómar Rincón, writing for El Tiempo, slams Karpan, Mendoza, and López calling their characters "un-bear-able," and says that at Industrias Copito "no one works, everyone yells." Rincón praises the plot, "it sounds plausible, it's sweet and creates empathy [with it]," and actors Espinosa and Cayo.

At gossip website lafiscalia.com, pinksauce praises its opening sequence, its scenes taped in New York, and the visual effects, but found some inconsistencies from the legal point of view on Emilio's return to Colombia, and criticizes Espinosa, Mendoza, Karpan, and Cayo, as well as the costume design and the make-up. Diana C., from telenovela portal todotnv.com, claims that the love story with unresolved sexual tension between Emilio and Antonia is "weak," though praises the "cuteness" brought by Emilio's daughter, and the fact that Cayo and Karpan don't hide their native accents (Peruvian and Argentinian, respectively); she praises most main actors, except López.

Ratings improved during its first week and, after having started in fifth place among the programmes broadcast in prime time, it finished third after the fourth episode. On 22 September 2011, it climbed to second place and became the most watched telenovela in Colombia that day.

== Awards and nominations ==
=== India Catalina Awards ===
Source:; the event is part of the Cartagena Film Festival

Year	Category	Nominee	Result
2012	Best telenovela	El secretario	Nominated
2012	Best telenovela actress	Stephanie Cayo	Won
2012	Best telenovela actor	Juan Pablo Espinosa	Won
2012	Best telenovela soundtrack	Solo tú, by Jimmy Pulido López and Fabo Romero	Won
2012	Best telenovela editing	Juan Pablo Serna	Nominated
2012	Best telenovela cinematography	Rafael Puentes and Freddy Castro	Nominated
2012	Best telenovela or series antagonistic actress	Andrea López	Nominated
2012	Best telenovela or series antagonistic actor	Martín Karpan	Nominated
2012	Best telenovela supporting actress	Margalida Castro	Won
2012	Best telenovela supporting actress	Valentina Lizcano	Nominated
2012	Best supporting telenovela actor	Fabián Mendoza	Won
2012	Best original telenovela screenplay and story	Jörg Hiller, Claudia Sánchez, and Catalina Coy	Won
2012	Best telenovela director	Juan Camilo Pinzón, Unai Amuchastegui	Nominated
2012	Best telenovela art direction	Modulario	Nominated

=== TVyNovelas Awards ===
Year	Category	Nominee	Result
2012	Favourite telenovela	El secretario	Won
2012	Favourite telenovela starring actress	Stephanie Cayo	Won
2012	Favourite telenovela starring actor	Juan Pablo Espinosa	Won
2012	Favourite telenovela supporting actor	Fernando Solórzano	Nominated
2012	Favourite telenovela supporting actor	Freddy Ordóñez	Won
2012	Favourite telenovela supporting actress	Valentina Lizcano	Nominated
2012	Favourite telenovela supporting actress	Margalida Castro	Won
2012	Favourite telenovela female villain	Andrea López	Nominated
2012	Favourite telenovela female villain	Alexandra Serrano	Nominated
2012	Favourite telenovela male villain	Fabián Mendoza	Won
2012	Favourite telenovela male villain	Martín Karpan	Nominated
2012	Favourite song theme	Solo tú by Jimmy Pulido López and Fabo Romero	Won
2012	Favourite screenwriter(s)	Jörg Hiller, Claudia Sánchez, Catalina Coy	Won
2012	Favourite telenovela or series director	Juan Camilo Pinzón, Unai Amuchástegui, Víctor Cantillo	Won

== International broadcast ==
In October 2011, El secretario premiered on Telesistema 11 in Dominican Republic. WAPA-TV broadcasts the telenovela in Puerto Rico since December 2011. El secretario premiered 9 January 2012 on Repretel (Canal 6) in Costa Rica, and 13 February 2012 on Chilean network La Red. In Ecuador it premiered 11 June 2012 on TC Televisión.

In Malaysia, it premieres on 8 October 2012, via Astro Bella and Astro Mustika HD (in HD) at 4:00pm. While the Mexican remake, Porque el amor manda, airing on Canal de las estrellas also premieres on the same date.
