= Romina poderosa =

2023 Colombian TV series

- Genre: Telenovela
- Created by: Camilo Acuña
- Developed by: Claudia F. Sánchez; Said Chamié
- Directed by: Rafael Martínez; Herney Luna
- Starring: Juanita Molina; David Palacio
- Music by: Samuel Lizarralde
- Country of origin: Colombia
- Original language: Spanish
- No. of seasons: 1
- No. of episodes: 65

Production
- Executive producers: Ángela Vergara; Amparo Gutiérrez; Dago García; Arlen Torres
- Editor: Juan Pablo Serna
- Production company: Caracol Televisión

Original release
- Network: Caracol Televisión
- Release: 31 May – 11 September 2023

Romina poderosa (English: Power Romina) is a Colombian telenovela created by Camilo Acuña. It aired on Caracol Televisión from 31 May to 11 September 2023. The series follows Romina as she impersonates her twin sister, Laura, to investigate the truth of her past. Juanita Molina stars as Romina and Laura, alongside David Palacio and Emmanuel Esparza.

== Plot ==
Romina Páez (Juanita Molina) is a young woman who practices downhill mountain biking. Her life takes a turn when she finds out she has a twin sister, Laura Vélez, from whom she was separated at birth. Romina and Laura are opposites in many ways, with Laura being prudent and shy. When they meet, the twins feel an instant connection and want to make up for lost time. However, Laura and the twins' biological mother are murdered by the Chitivas, who mistake Laura for Romina, whom they have always seen as a threat. Romina has always raised her voice against the Chitiva brothers for overwhelming the neighborhood with loans that are impossible to pay. Romina decides take on her sister's life in order to bring justice. Laura's family does not know that the twins met and that Romina is pretending to be Laura.

== Cast ==
- Juanita Molina as Romina Páez and Laura Vélez
- David Palacio as Cristobal Ruíz "Calidoso"
- Zharick León as Virginia Vélez
- Emmanuel Esparza as Sergio Vélez
- Juan Guilera as Santiago Moya
- Kevin Bury as Leonardo Chitiva
- Nicolás Quiroga as Benny Chitiva
- Alejandro Buitrago as Marlon Chitiva
- Camila Rojas as Alex Bedoya
- Fernando Arévalo as Rubén
- Valeria Gálviz
- Sofía Estrada as Mariana
- Erik Joel Rodríguez as Edwin Guarín
- María Luisa Flores as Yesenia Páez

== Production ==
Filming of the series began in September 2022 and concluded on 8 May 2023.

== Release ==
Romina poderosa premiered on Caracol Televisión on 26 July 2023. Internationally, the show began streaming on Netflix on 30 August 2023, under the title Miss Adrenaline: A Tale of Twins.

== Episodes ==
No.	Title	Original release date	Colombia viewers (Rating points)
1	"Laura y Romina se conocen y descubren que realmente son hermanas"	31 May 2023	5.5
2	"Laura y Yesenia son víctimas del plan de los Chitiva"	1 June 2023	6.3
3	"Romina se entera de lo sucedido con su hermana y su mamá"	2 June 2023	6.1
4	"Familiares y amigos de Romina lamentan su muerte en el funeral"	5 June 2023	5.9
5	"Romina se aparece en su funeral y genera sorpresa entre sus vecinos"	6 June 2023	7.4
6	"Los ataques de rabia de Romina y sus descuidos pueden poner en peligro su plan"	7 June 2023	6.7
7	"Santiago tiene sospechas de que algo malo le ocurrió a Laura en el viaje que hizo sola"	8 June 2023	6.4
8	"Romina llega tarde a una cita con su familia por ayudar en un operativo"	9 June 2023	6.1
9	"Calidoso recibe un video donde ve a Romina en el operativo, ¿descubre la verdad?"	13 June 2023	6.5
10	"Romina vuelve a aparecer en La Mira y es perseguida por Calidoso y dos hombres de Leo"	14 June 2023	5.7
11	"Calidoso empieza a considerar que se está volviendo loco"	15 June 2023	6.5
12	"Virginia y Sergio enfrentan nuevamente un problema de su pasado"	16 June 2023	5.6
13	"La familia de Laura le pide a Romina visitar un médico"	20 June 2023	5.7
14	"Romina descubre un secreto sobre Laura que la deja impactada"	21 June 2023	5.6
15	"Romina le dice a Sergio que desea empezar a trabajar en la empresa familiar"	22 June 2023	5.9
16	"Calidoso captura a Marlon y lo interroga para que le dé información sobre el Don"	23 June 2023	5.5
17	"Calidoso y Alex visitan a Sonia Mendigaña y empiezan a unir las piezas para encontrar sospechosos"	26 June 2023	5.7
18	"Romina descubre un enorme secreto de Laura mientras que Sergio y Calidoso besa a Alex"	27 June 2023	6.5
19	"Virginia y Abelardo tienen cada vez más problemas y ahora Juan Manuel se involucrará"	28 June 2023	6.5
20	"Romina empieza a confundirse con Santiago, mientras que los Moya estudian cómo sacar a Virginia de la mafia del Grifo"	29 June 2023	6.3
21	"Leo y Marlon despiden a Benny mientras que Romina enfrenta una crisis por su futuro"	30 June 2023	5.3
22	"Sergio aprueba el proyecto de Romina, pero Nayibe la enfrenta"	4 July 2023	6.5
23	"Rubén le sugiere a Romina que le cuente a Calidoso que está viva"	5 July 2023	5.7
24	"Calidoso descubre que Romina está viva y queda en shock al verla frente a frente"	6 July 2023	6.2
25	"Romina descubre que Calidoso está saliendo con Bedoya, ¿cómo reacciona?"	7 July 2023	6.0
26	"Entre la espada y la pared: sin darse cuenta, Romina queda en medio de un triángulo amoroso"	10 July 2023	6.3
27	"Romina se entera de un secreto del pasado de Virginia"	11 July 2023	6.1
28	"Sergio empieza a sentir el desconsuelo de la muerte de Romina y visita su tumba"	12 July 2023	6.8
29	"Los Chitiva empiezan a sufrir las consecuencias de la cooperativa de Romina"	13 July 2023	6.2
30	"Santi visita a Juan Manuel y descubre que está con una mujer en el apartamento, ¿sospecha de Virginia?"	14 July 2023	6.0
31	"Romina se siente confundida y besa a Santiago, mientras que Sergio busca reconciliarse con Virginia"	17 July 2023	6.4
32	"Gregorio sufre las consecuencias de los planes de Romina, ¿pagará por ella?"	18 July 2023	6.4
33	"Calidoso pone en marcha un operativo para rescatar a Gregoria, ¿será demasiado tarde?"	19 July 2023	6.3
34	"Romina toma decisiones tras lo ocurrido con Gregorio"	21 July 2023	6.5
35	"Romina y Calidoso unen las piezas del rompecabezas para encontrar al Don"	25 July 2023	6.5
36	"Romina y Calidoso descubren que la mamá de Virginia aún está con vida"	26 July 2023	6.3
37	"El plan de Virginia, Juan Manuel y Diana funciona, detienen a Abelardo"	27 July 2023	6.8
38	"Virginia soluciona un imprevisto después de verse con Leonardo Chitiva"	28 July 2023	7.3
39	"Leo le dice al Don que deben acabar con Calidoso"	31 July 2023	7.5
40	"Virginia le dice a Juan Manuel que de ahora en adelante se entenderá con Leo"	1 August 2023	7.6
41	"Calidoso y Santiago apoyan a Romina en su nuevo plan, pero sus celos les juegan una mala pasada"	2 August 2023	7.9
42	"Virginia se da cuenta que Juan Manuel estuvo con otra mujer en el apartamento"	3 August 2023	8.0
43	"Álex Bedoya descubre que Romina no está muerta"	4 August 2023	7.4
44	"Virginia queda sobre las cuerdas, ¿descubren que es 'El Don'?"	8 August 2023	7.2
45	"Romina logra que Virginia queme la agenda de sus negocios y prometa que todo cambiará"	9 August 2023	7.3
46	"Romina le confiesa a Sergio su verdadera identidad"	10 August 2023	7.4
47	"Sergio debe decidir si contarle todo a Virginia o proteger a Romina"	11 August 2023	7.9
48	"Sergio parece no poder controlar la realidad y sufre un preinfarto"	14 August 2023	8.1
49	"Marlon es envenenado en la cárcel, mientras que Sergio se reúne con el equipo de Romina"	15 August 2023	7.3
50	"Santiago se entera de una noticia que lo termina de destrozar"	16 August 2023	8.3
51	"Romina y Calidoso tienen una cena romántica mientras Leo ejecuta su plan"	17 August 2023	7.4
52	"Santiago le devuelve la libreta a Romina y le dice que se irá a Argentina"	18 August 2023	7.2
53	"Virginia cumple con su objetivo y asesina a Juan Manuel para sacarlo del negocio"	22 August 2023	8.3
54	"Los Chitiva vuelven a la Mirla y aterrorizan a toda la comunidad con sus actos vandálicos"	23 August 2023	7.3
55	"La Mirla está bajo ataque, Romina le ayuda a la policía a capturar a los delincuentes"	24 August 2023	8.0
56	"Virginia une las piezas y poco a poco se da cuenta de que su hija no es quien dice ser"	25 August 2023	7.5
57	"Las verdades que oculta Romina empiezan a salir a la luz"	28 August 2023	8.0
58	"Marlon le cuenta a Virginia que ha estado conviviendo por meses con Romina"	29 August 2023	8.1
59	"Romina le da la cara a La Mirla, pero los habitantes intentan lincharla"	30 August 2023	7.8
60	"Marlon le ofrece a Alex salvar a Calidoso si ella le entrega a Romina"	31 August 2023	7.8
61	"Calidoso es rescatado por Álex y Romina, pero recibe un disparo en el operativo"	1 September 2023	7.8
62	"El Don ejecuta a otra de sus víctimas y planea escapar del país"	4 September 2023	8.8
63	"Virginia es capturada y los hermanos Chitiva inician con su plan de escape"	5 September 2023	8.8
64	"Leo le revela a Romina que tiene una prueba clave contra Virginia"	6 September 2023	8.8
65	"Romina tiene un enfrentamiento de vida o muerte entre Los Chitiva y Virginia"	11 September 2023	9.3

== Reception ==
=== Ratings ===
Season	Timeslot (COT)	Episodes	First aired		Last aired		Avg. viewers (in points)
Season	Timeslot (COT)	Episodes	Date	Viewers (in points)	Date	Viewers (in points)	Avg. viewers (in points)
1	Mon–Fri 9:30 p.m.	65	31 May 2023	5.5	11 September 2023	9.3	6.9

=== Awards and nominations ===
Year	Award	Category	Nominated	Result	Ref
2023	Produ Awards	Best Superseries	Romina poderosa	Nominated	
2023	Produ Awards	Best Lead Actor - Superseries or Telenovela	David Palacio	Nominated	
2023	Produ Awards	Best Supporting Actress - Superseries or Telenovela	Zharick León	Nominated	
2023	Produ Awards	Best Supporting Actor - Superseries or Telenovela	Juan Guilera	Nominated	
2023	Produ Awards	Best Directing - Superseries or Telenovela	Herney Luna and Rafael Martínez	Nominated	
2023	Produ Awards	Best Screenplay - Superseries or Telenovela	Said Chamié and Claudia Sánchez	Won	
2023	Produ Awards	Best Creative Directing	Diego Guarnizo and Germán Lizarralde	Nominated	
2023	Produ Awards	Best Music Composer	Samuel Lizarralde	Nominated	
