= Bia Ferreira =

Brazilian musical artist

- Ferreria at the 2026 Latin Grammy Awards

Background information
- Born: April 19, 1993 (age 33)
- Origin: Carangola, Minas Gerais
- Genres: Soul, funk, R&B
- Occupations: Singer, songwriter
- Instruments: voice, acoustic guitar, piano, others
- Years active: 2009–present
- Website: biaferreira.com

Bia Ferreira (Carangola, Minas Gerais, 19 April 1993) is a Brazilian singer, composer, multi-instrumentalist and artivist. Her music, which she defines as "MMP — Música de Mulher Preta" (Black Woman Music), discusses topics such as feminism, anti-racism and homophobia. She claims her music is created to generate "discomfort" that in turn generates "movement", at the same time that she tries to write songs pleasant enough to get her message across. Her lyrics have been described as "escrevivência" ("writexperience"), a concept by Conceição Evaristo.

== Early life and musical beginnings ==
Born to a traditional evangelical family, Ferreira studied music since she was a child. Her mother was a singer, choir conductor, pianist and singing teacher. At the age of 3, she started to study the piano and later got into the Brazilian Music Conservatory.

Around the age of 12, she wrote her first song. In its lyrics, she asked God not to be a lesbian—an agony that resulted from her religious upbringing.

== Career ==
=== Beginnings and first hits (2009–2018) ===
She began her musical activities in 2009, at the age of 15 in Aracaju, Sergipe, where she was raised by her familya after a period in Piracicaba, São Paulo. It was around that time that she began to learn more about black and lesbian feminism.

She left home early and toured alone across Brazil, hitchhiking and playing for some change; to make more money, she developed unusual ways of playing the guitar, such as playing behind her head or with just one hand.

"Cota Não É Esmola" and "Não Precisa Ser Amélia" were composed in 2011, became some of her greatest hits and discussed topics such as the racial quota systems of SISU (a kind of Brazilian SAT) and the condition of black women in Brazil. Ferreira classifies her music as "Música de Mulher Preta (MMP) (Black Woman Music (BWM)" due to her strong focus on these topics. "Cota Não É Esmola" became a mandatory study material for the vestibulares of University of Brasília, Federal University of Minas Gerais and Federal University of Paraná, as well as for students of SESI-SP.

Her debut album was a live recording of a performance for the Estúdio Showlivre project, released in November 2018. Still in 2018, she took part in a festival supporting the Free Lula movement and in the documentary A Thousand Women, by Rita Toledo, alongside fellow artists Lena Chen (from the USA), Florencia Duran (from Uruguay) and Ana Luisa Santos (from Brazil). She also performed for the Sofar Sounds project in Curitiba on 27 September.

=== Igreja Lesbiteriana, Um Chamado and second studio album (2019–present) ===
Since 2013, Ferreira prepared her debut album Igreja Lesbiteriana, Um Chamado, which was released on 13 September 2019. It had already been recorded three times before, but she never managed to release it. The final opportunity came in April 2018, when she met producer Vinícius Lezo. The album's lyrics were written and sung under a neuro-linguistic programming approach which, according to her, would help the brain to better absorb her message. The album was promoted by the single "De Dentro do AP", which received a clip created by a wholly female production team, a wholly black cast and crew, and featured a performance by poet Thata Alves. The church referred to on the album title (which translates as "Lesbyterian Church, A Call") is supposed to be a place of shelter for people who are usually told by Protestant and Pentecostal churches that they are not loved by God.

In 2019, she toured in Europe; in an interview for a German website, she claimed that under the presidency of Jair Bolsonaro, "many of my tours were cancelled, and the police threatens me because they don't like what I say". In the same year, she replaced actress Larissa Luz in the role of Elza Soares in the São Paulo sessions of the musical Elza.

On 29 August 2020, she performed at Fundação Espaço Cultural da Paraíba as part of celebrations for the Lesbian Visibility Day.

On 1 October 2020, she released the video "Boto Fé". Initially, a fake video was purposely aired on 25 September, showing Ferreira in 2035 hacking the system to air the "right" video on the new date; the video's promotional efforts involved a letter written in 2035, where humanity is ruled by robots and satellites, and all natural resources have been exhausted already. The track featured BNegão.

In December 2021, she co-wrote the song "Olhares Cruzados" via the Influência Negra platform for an homonymous campaign by Dove.

On 10 March 2022, she released the song "Agora Vai", alongside Xamã and Lia Clark, discussing financial empowerment.

Since the beginning of the COVID-19 pandemic, Ferreira has been preparing her second studio album, which will be released by Natura Musical and distributed by Altafonte Brasil. In some more recent shows, she's been adopting lyrics more focused on offering solutions for the problems she would previously comment; according to her, this is part of a strategy to "present tenderness as a survival technology and information as the key to liberating black, native or LGBTQIA+ people who have suffered any form of oppression".

== Musical style ==
Her debut studio album, Igreja Lesbiteriana, Um Chamado, contains elements of soul, reggae, blues, funk, R&B and gospel. Among her influences are Angela Davis, Assata Shakur, Leci Brandão, Conceição Evaristo, Erica Malunguinho, Preta Rara, Eva Rap Diva, Sueli Carneiro, Audrey Lorde, Manu Coutinho de Aracajú, Jaêmia, Laine Almeida, Anaia, Débora Ambrosia, Bruna Amara, Luz Ribeiro, Dani Monteiro, Talíria Petrone, Ellen Oléria, Kimani, Mel Duarte, Kelly Estácio, Preta Ferreira, Luciane Dom, Renata Souza, Carol Daffara, Ryane Leão, Sueide Kinté and Nara Couto.

== Discography ==
- Ao Vivo (2018)
- Igreja Lesbiteriana, Um Chamado (2019)

=== Singles ===
- "Boto Fé" (2020)
