= Martín Karpan =

Argentine-Colombian actor

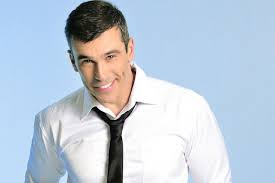
Martín Karpan in 2016

Carlos Martín Karpan (born June 3, 1974 in Villa del Parque, Buenos Aires, Argentina) is an Argentine-Colombian actor, notable for playing a villain in the telenovela El Cuerpo del Deseo and Te Voy a Enseñar a Querer.

== Personal life ==
He has a son, Luciano, born on July 8, 2008, with actress Zharick León. His father was an actor and his mother was a housewife.

== Filmography ==
=== Television ===
- El final del paraíso (2019) - Salvatore
- La Viuda Negra ll (2016)-Ferguson
- El secretario (2011) - Félix Armando Segura
- Clase ejecutiva (2010) - Julian Coronado
- Kdabra (2009–2011) - Daniel Trejo (Astronauta)
- El Rostro de Analía (2008–2009) - Daniel Montiel
- Nuevo rico, nuevo pobre (2007 - July 2008) - Andres Ferreira
- La Viuda de Blanco (2006) - Amador Blanco
- El Cuerpo del Deseo (2005) - Andrés Corona
- Te Voy a Enseñar a Querer (2004-2005) - Luis Carlos López
- El auténtico Rodrigo Leal (2003) - Rodrigo Leal
- Máximo corazón (2002) - Roberto Gómez 'El Facha'
- ¿Y dónde está el bebé? (2002)
- Amor latino (2000) - Leonel Díaz
- Los buscas de siempre (2000)
- Calientes (2000) - Rey
- Primicias (2000)
- Signos (2000)
- No muertos (1999) - Natan Balasko
- Como vos & yo (1998) - Manuel Andrade
- Gasoleros (1998) - Rubén
- La nocturna (1998)
- Momentos robados (1997)
- De corazón (1997) - Nicolás
- Sueltos (1996) - Mariano
- Flores amarillas en la ventana (1996) - Ricardo
