= Without Saying Goodbye =

- Spanish: Hasta que nos volvamos a encontrar
- Directed by: Bruno Ascenzo
- Written by: Bruno Ascenzo
- Starring: Maxi Iglesias; Stephanie Cayo; Jely Reategui
- Production companies: Netflix; Tondero Films
- Distributed by: Netflix
- Release date: 18 March 2022
- Running time: 96 minutes
- Countries: Peru; Spain
- Language: Spanish

Without Saying Goodbye (Spanish: Hasta que nos volvamos a encontrar, lit. 'Until We Meet Again') is a 2022 Peruvian-Spanish romantic comedy film written and directed by Bruno Ascenzo and starring Maxi Iglesias, Stephanie Cayo and Jely Reategui.

== Cast ==
- Maxi Iglesias as Salvador Campodónico
- Stephanie Cayo as Ariana
- Jely Reátegui
- Ahmed Shawky Shaheen
- Vicente Vergara
- Renata Flores
- Muki Sabogal
- Mayella Lloclla
- Rodrigo Palacios
- Wendy Ramos
- Anai Padilla
- Amiel Cayo
- Carlos Carlín
- Alberik García
- Nicolás Galindo
