= Pedro Rendón =

Ecuadorian gymnast (born 1941)

- Born: 27 April 1941 (age 85) Guayaquil, Ecuador

Gymnastics career
- Discipline: Men's artistic gymnastics
- Country represented: Ecuador

Pedro Rendón (born 27 April 1941) is an Ecuadorian gymnast. He competed in seven events at the 1968 Summer Olympics.
