= Larissa Luz =

Brazilian singer-songwriter (born 1987)

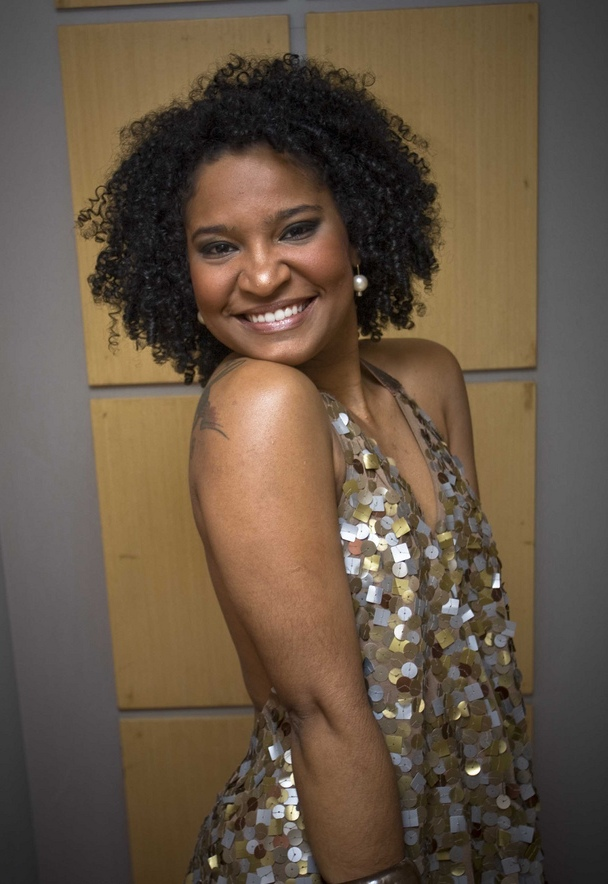
- Luz in 2010
- Born: Larissa Luz de Jesus; 15 May 1987 (age 39); Salvador, Bahia, Brazil
- Occupation: singer
- Years active: 2001–present
- Musical career
- Genres: MPB, Axé

Larissa Luz de Jesus (born 15 May 1987) is a Brazilian singer-songwriter and actress.

== Life and career ==
Born in Salvador, Bahia, Luz started studying piano and singing when she was 12 years old. In 2001, she became a member of an all-female rock band, Lucy in the sky, with whom she performed in local nightclubs, and in the following years she joined other groups (Egrégoras, Interart, Tempero Nagô) and had gigs as solo singer in various local shopping centres and bars.

Luz became first known in 2007, when she replaced Tatau as lead singer of the axé group Ara Ketu. In 2012, she left the band, and one year later she released her debut solo album, Mundança.

In 2015, Luz launched the single "Território conquistado", anticipating the eponymous album, released one year later and which included guest appearances by Elza Soares and Thalma de Freitas. A concept album honoring ten black Brazilian personalities that Luz conceived in collaboration with anthropologist Goli Guerreiro, it was nominated for a Latin Grammy Award for Best Portuguese Language Contemporary Pop Album. Also in 2016, she performed at the opening ceremony of the 2016 Summer Olympics, singing "Canto de Ossanha" in a duet with Elza Soares. The collaboration with Soares continued in 2017, when Luz opened her concerts in the Elza canta Lupi tour, while in 2018 Luz was protagonist of the Soares-tributing stage musical Elza - O Musical. For her performance she was awarded the Bibi Ferreira Prize for best actress in a musical.

In 2019, Luz released her third alum Trovão, produced by Rafa Dias and featuring collaborations with Bia Ferreira, Letieres Leite, Ellen Oléria, Lazzo Matumbi and Luedji Luna. The album was included in the list of the 25 best Brazilian albums of the year authored by Associação Paulista de Críticos de Arte. In 2022, she released the EP Deusa Dulov (Vol. 1) in collaboration with Tropkillaz, and made her debut as television presenter hosting the GNT program Saia Justa. In 2023, she was a contestant of the show The Masked Singer Brasil. The same year, she played Elza Soares in the biographical film Mussum. In 2024, she performed at Rock in Rio and at Afropunk Festival in New York.

== Discography ==
Albums

- Mundança (2013)
- Território Conquistado (2016)
- Trovão (2019)
- Deusa Dulov (Vol. 1) (2022, EP, with Tropkillaz)
