= Graduados (Colombian TV series) =

- Genre: comedy
- Created by: Sebastián Ortega
- Written by: Fabiola Carrillo; Patricia Rodriguez; Carolina Barrera
- Directed by: Víctor Mallarino; Sergio Osorio
- Starring: Luis Fernando Hoyos; Kathy Sáenz; Jorge Enrique Abello; Santiago Moure; Zharick León; Diana Ángel
- Country of origin: Colombia
- Original language: Spanish
- No. of seasons: 1
- No. of episodes: 257

Original release
- Network: RCN Televisión
- Release: September 18, 2013 – October 16, 2014

Related
- Allá te espero; Manual para ser feliz

Graduados is a 2013 Colombian telenovela, a remake of the Argentine telenovela Graduados. It starred Luis Fernando Hoyos, Kathy Sáenz, Jorge Enrique Abello, Santiago Moure, Zharick León and Diana Ángel.

== Plot ==
The first episode takes place in a graduation night, in 1993. María Laura Vallejo (Kathy Saenz), the girlfriend of the school bully Pablo Urrutia (Jorge Enrique Abello), left him when he cheated on her. Andrés Torres (Luis Fernando Hoyos) drives her out of the school premises and had sex with her. She got pregnant, and got married with Pablo, as she thought that he was the father of her boy.

After a time skip of 20 years, Andrés meets María Laura again, and they discover that her son Martín (Juan Pablo Urrego) was actually the son of Andrés and not Pablo.

== Reception ==
The original telenovela Graduados was a huge success in Argentina, so RCN Televisión bought the rights to make a Colombian remake, expecting a similar success. However, the series had a poor reception. Ómar Rincon, from the newspaper "El Tiempo", attributed it to the poor actor performances, a failure to capture the feeling of the eighties, plot references to the Argentine society which were not properly modified to reference the Colombian one, and a failure to use the music as a plot element, rather than as a mere background. The Colombian writer Cecilia Percy pointed as well that there are few previous attempts in Colombia to produce remakes, and that they usually generated poor received works even when the original one was a success.

== Cast ==
- Kathy Sáenz as Laura "Lali" Vallejo
- Luis Fernando Hoyos as Andrés "Andy" Torres Castro
- Jorge Enrique Abello as Pablo Urrutia "Pablardo" -" footloser"
- Zharick León as Jimena Rocha/Patricia Delgado
- Santiago Moure as "Chicho"
- Diana Ángel as Verónica "Vero" Paz
- Luis Eduardo Arango as Clemente Vallejo "Don Bacan"
- Fernando Arévalo as Elías Torres
- Carla Giraldo as Gabriela "Gaby" Torres Castro
- Luces Velásquez as Nubia Castro de Torres
- Victoria Góngora as Victoria "Vicky" Pombo
- Carlos Manuel Vesga as Guillermo "Guille" Aldana
- Juan Pablo Urrego as Martín Urrutia "Martincho"
- Álvaro Bayona as Walter
- Luz Estrada as "Clarita"
- Verónica Orozco as Teresa
- Andrés Toro as Augusto Echeverria
- Diana Neira as Sofía Duarte
- Karla Ramírez as Inés Duarte
- Lucas Buelvas as Juancho
- Cristina Umaña as Sandra "kasandra" Mendez
- Jim Munoz as Lucas
- Bernardo Garcia as Mario
- Orlando Lamboglia as "Currulao"
- Consuelo Luzardo as Profesora Quiñonez "Riñones"
- Marcelo Dos Santos as Dany Torres
- Lina Tejeiro as Luna
- Alejandro López as Gustavo
- Lorna Paz as Juana
- Luis Fernando Bohorquez as Fernando
