= Thalma de Freitas =

Brazilian actress, singer, and composer

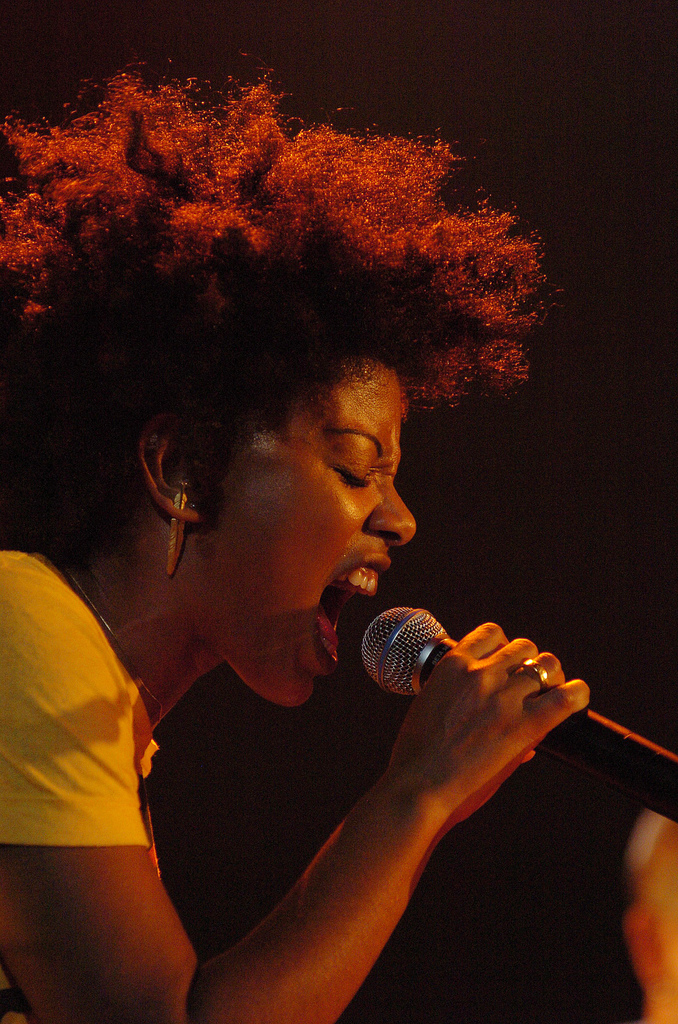
- Thalma de Freitas in concert (2006)
- Born: May 14, 1974 (age 52); Rio de Janeiro, Brazil
- Occupations: Actress, singer, songwriter, producer
- Years active: 1992–present
- Musical career
- Genres: MPB, indie, jazz

Thalma de Freitas (Rio de Janeiro, May 14, 1974) is a Brazilian actress, singer and composer.

== Career ==
The daughter of the composer, conductor and pianist Laércio de Freitas, at 14 she began studying singing and acting at the Teatro Escola Macunaíma. She made her acting debut in 1992, in a stage production of Hair, and in 1996 she debuted on television in the Rede Manchete telenovela Xica da Silva. She then got her an exclusive contract with TV Globo, during which she starred in over a dozen telenovelas.

She made her recording debut in 2004, with the album Thalma. The same year, she was awarded Best Supporting Actress at the Gramado Film Festival for her performance in Joel Zito Araújo's Filhas do Vento.

In 2012, she performed at the closing ceremony of the London Paralympics together with Carlinhos Brown and Os Paralamas do Sucesso. As a composer, she has collaborated with a variety of artists including Gal Costa, Mariana Aydar, Gaby Amarantos, Ed Motta and Filipe Catto. She also collaborated with Kamasi Washington on three albums. Her 2019 album Sorte!, in collaboration with composer John Finbury, was nominated for a Grammy Award in the Best Latin Jazz Album category.

=== Personal life ===
Married to photographer Brian Cross, with whom she had a daughter, since 2012 she lives in Los Angeles.

== Discography ==
- 1996 - Thalma (Sony Music)
- 2004 - Thalma de Freitas (EMI)
- 2007 - Carnaval Só No Ano Que Vem (Som Livre)
- 2019 - Sorte! (with John Finbury, Green Flash Music)

== Filmography ==
=== Cinema ===
Year	Title	Role	Notes
2001	A Samba for Sherlock	Ana Candelária	
2001	Bufo & Spallanzani	Risoleta	
2003	O Corneteiro Lopes	Estrela	
2004	As Filhas do Vento	Young Maria da Ajuda "Ju"	
2006	Alabê de Jerusalém	Marian	
2009	Heaven Garden	Hell's Tongue	Short film
2012	Gonzaga — de Pai pra Filho	Dancing singer	
2013	Mundo Invisível	Guest	
2017	Erase Me	Ângela	Short film
2019	Dulcinea	Martha	
2024	My Penguin Friend	Calista	
2026	On Behalf of My Son	Cleide	

=== Television ===
Year	Title	Role	Notes
1996	Xica da Silva	Caetana	
1996	Vira Lata	Dolores Moura de Cavalcante	
1998	Dona Flor	Marilda	
1998	Malhação	Wanderléia Matoso Gonçalves	Season 4
1998	Labirinto	Glória	
1999	Andando nas Nuvens	Zezé	
2000	Laços de Família	Zilda	
2001	O Clone	Carol	
2003	Kubanacan	Dalila	
2004	Começar de Novo	Elvira	
2005	Bang Bang	Regina da Silva "Baiana"	
2006	Lu	Gisele	
2007	Som Brasil	Herself	
2007	Sete Pecados	Berenice	
2009	Caras & Bocas	Magaly Franco	
2009	Som Brasil	Herself	Episode: "Tim Maia"
2010	Malhação	Nathália Diniz	Season 18
2012	Malhação	Rita Lima Svensson	Season 20
2023	Histórias (Im)Possíveis	Housemaid	Episode: "Levante"
2026	Dona Beja	Josefa Carneiro de Mendonça	
