= Marcelo Buquet =

Uruguayan actor and former model

- Born: October 4, 1963 (age 62); Montevideo, Uruguay
- Years active: 1989–present
- Spouse: Lorena Sotelo (m. ? - wid. 2013)

Héctor Marcelo Buquet Corleto (born October 4, 1963 in Montevideo, Uruguay) is a Uruguayan actor and former model.

== Biography ==
At the age of 18 Buquet joined a theater company in his native Uruguay called El Galpón del Uruguay where he participated in 25 stage productions as an actor, producer, songwriter and singer. At the age of 26 he moved to Mexico and participated in the telenovela Simplemente María with Victoria Ruffo and in Manolo Fábregas' production of Bear Jest for which he was nominated as the Best Comedy Actor of the Year by the Association of Theater Journalists of Mexico. In 1992 he obtained a role in his second telenovela: El abuelo y yo with Gael García Bernal. The following year he obtained a role in Uruguay's full feature film El dirigible. In 1994 he produced and starred in Triángulo directed by Miguel Córcega in Mexico City and Montevideo, Uruguay and in Che... Che... Chejov which received the Best Self-Taught Production of the Year. In 1998 he played as Rodrigo Bracho in La usurpadora and its special short sequel Más allá de la usurpadora. His most recent work was his fourth Colombian telenovela: Doña Bella in 2010.

== Awards ==
- 1998 Special mention by the Association of Theater Critics of Uruguay
- 1994 Best Self-Taught Production of the Year by the Mexican Association of Theater Critics
- 1991 Foreign-born Model of the Year by Contempo Agency

== Telenovelas ==
Year	Title	Character	Note
2024	Vivir de amor	Mauricio	
2021	Si nos dejan	Quijada	Recurring role
2019	El Dragón	Rosario	Recurring role
2017-18	La hija pródiga	Antonio Mansilla Landero	Supporting role
2016-17	La Piloto	Omar Nieves	Supporting role
2015	Lo imperdonable	Aquiles Botel	Supporting role
2012-13	Qué bonito amor	Rubén del Olmo	Supporting role
2011-12	Corazón apasionado	Bruno Montesinos	Supporting role
2010	Doña Bella	Román Montero	Supporting role
2007	La marca del deseo	Reynaldo de Santibáñez	Supporting role
2005	La Tormenta	Simón Guerrero	Supporting role
2005	La madrastra	Gerardo Salgado	Recurring role
2004	La mujer en el espejo	Juan Tobías Fonseca	Recurring role
2003	Ladrón de corazones	Patricio Benítez	Recurring role
1998-99	El diario de Daniela	Enrique Monroy #1	Lead role; 70 episodes
1998	La Usurpadora	Rodrigo Bracho	Main role
1997	María Isabel	Cristóbal	Supporting role
1995	El premio mayor	Don Lorenzo	Supporting role
1994	Marimar	Rodolfo San Genis	Supporting role
1992	El abuelo y yo	Gerardo	Main role
1989	Simplemente María	Fernando Torres	Supporting role
