= Stephanie Cayo =

Peruvian actress, singer and songwriter

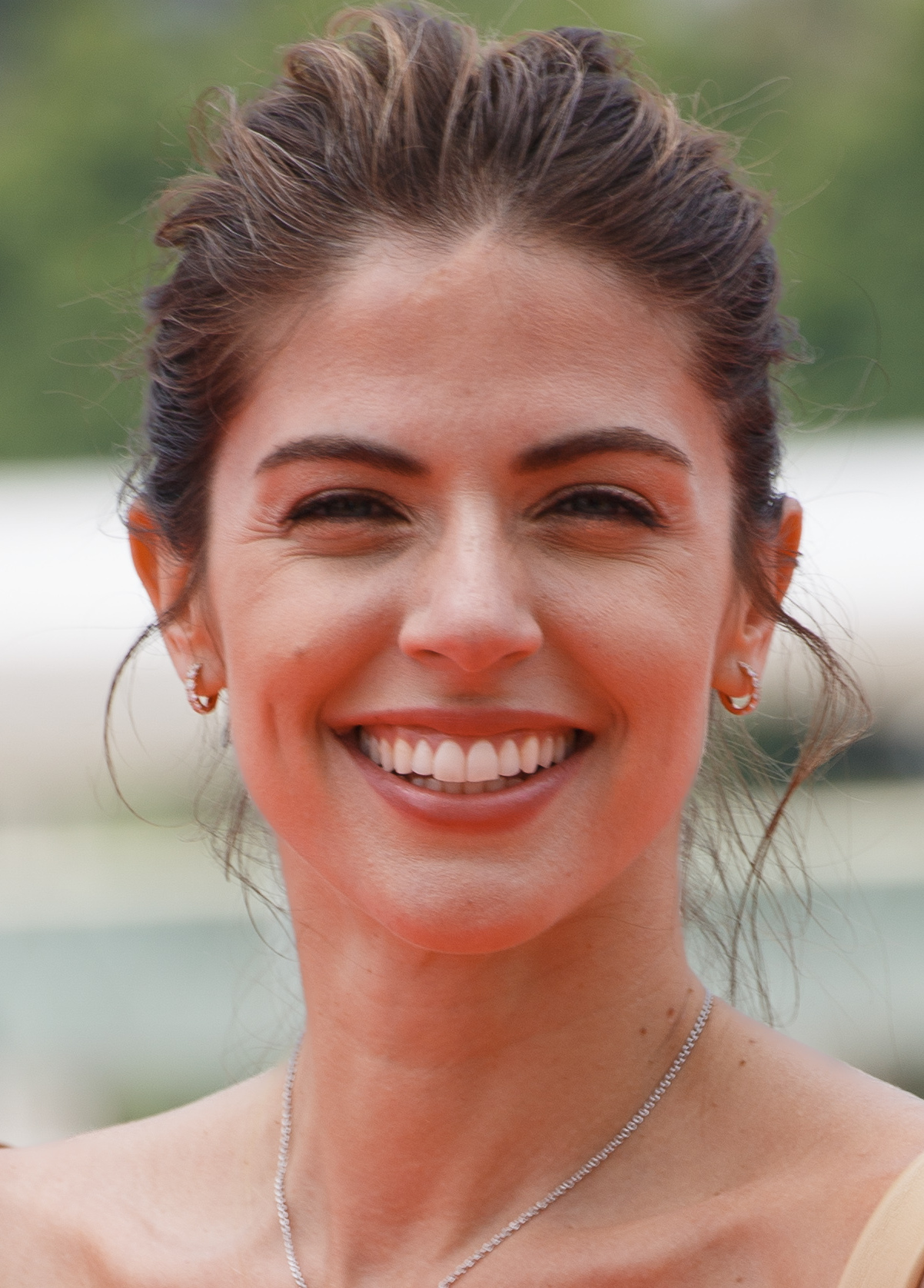
- Cayo in 2021.
- Born: Stephanie Cristina Cayo Sanguinetti; April 8, 1988 (age 38); Lima, Peru
- Education: New York Film Academy
- Occupations: actress; model; singer; songwriter
- Years active: 1998–present
- Height: 1.68
- Spouse: Chad Campbell (m. 2018; div. 2021)

Stephanie Cristina Cayo Sanguinetti (born April 8, 1988) is a Peruvian actress, singer and songwriter.

== Early life ==
When she was 10 years old, she appeared in Peruvian telenovela Travesuras del Corazón. She later appeared as a primary character in several TV series, particularly gaining international exposure playing the main female character in the internationally-broadcast Besos Robados.

== Family ==
She is the younger sister of actresses Bárbara Cayo and Fiorella Cayo.

== Filmography ==
Film roles
Year	Title	Roles	Notes
2005	Pirates in Callao	Alberto	Voice role
2018	Yucatán	Véronica	
2019	Como caído del cielo	Samantha	
2019	Bad Impulse	Lucia	
2020	Force of Nature	Jess	Direct-to-video film
2022	Without Saying Goodbye	Ariana	English title: Without Saying Goodbye

Television roles
Year	Title	Roles	Notes
1998	Travesuras del corazón	Cinthia	
1999	María Emilia, querida	Gabriela "Gaby" Aguirre González	
2004	Besos robados	Paloma Velacochea	Main role
2006	Rebelde	Wanda	1 episode
2007	La marca del deseo	María Valentina	Main role
2008	Tiempo final	Unknown role	Episode: "Cada vez que respiras"
2010	Doña Bella	Evangelina Rosales	Recurring role, 95 episodes
2011–2012	El Secretario	Antonia "Toni" Fontalvo	Main role
2013	La hipocondríaca	Macarena González	Main role
2015–2019	Club de Cuervos	Mary Luz Solari	Main role (seasons 1–2, 4)
2016	La Hermandad	Milena	Main role (season 1)
2017	El Comandante	Mónica Zabaleta	
2023	The Patients of Dr. García	Meg Williams	
2026	Doc	Dr. Julia Jasso	

== See also ==
- List of Peruvians
