= Sin senos sí hay paraíso season 2 =

Sin senos sí hay paraíso
- Season 2
- Starring: Carmen Villalobos; Catherine Siachoque; Fabián Ríos; Majida Issa; Carolina Gaitán; Roberto Manrique; Gregorio Pernía; Johanna Fadul; Juan Pablo Urrego; Francisco Bolívar; Juan Alfonso Baptista
- No. of episodes: 87

Release
- Original network: Telemundo
- Original release: 25 July – 28 November 2017

Season chronology
- Next → Season 3

The second season of the American television drama series Sin senos sí hay paraíso, comprising 87 episodes, aired on Telemundo from 25 July 2017 to 28 November 2017. The show was broadcast from Monday to Friday at 9pm/8c.

The second season revolves around Catalina Santana, who becomes an undercover agent of the DEA and changes her name to Virginia Fernández after pretending to be dead for 20 years. Catalina returns to Colombia to protect her family from Las Diablas, but her return only causes pain, disappointment, and tragedy for her mother.

The season premiered with a total of 1.82 million viewers, becoming the most watched Spanish-language show at 9pm/8c on Telemundo. The final episode of the season averages a total of 2.03 million viewers, this being the production in Spanish-language most seen at 9pm/8c.

== Cast and characters ==
=== Main characters ===
- Carmen Villalobos as Catalina Santana / Virginia Fernández, she is an agent of the DEA.
- Catherine Siachoque as Hilda Santana, mom of the Catalinas. After learning that her oldest daughter was not dead, she faints, which causes her to lose her memory after an operation.
- Fabián Ríos as Albeiro Marín, Catalina Marín's father.
- Majida Issa as Yésica Beltrán / La Diabla, Daniela's mother. After being imprisoned in a prison in the United States, she escapes and begins her revenge against Las Catalinas.
- Carolina Gaitán as Catalina Marín, daughter of Albeiro and Hilda and little sister of Catalina Santana.
- Roberto Manrique as Santiago Sanín, he is a doctor who falls in love with Catalina Santana, and has two children with her Mariana and Sebastián. Later it is revealed that he had a child out of wedlock.
- Gregorio Pernía as Aurelio Jaramillo / El Titi, after helping the Marín and Marcial family to unmask La Diabla, he returns to the drug trafficking business and becomes the main enemy of all.
- Johanna Fadul as Daniela Barrera, daughter of La Diabla.
- Juan Pablo Urrego as Hernán Darío, is the boyfriend of Catalina Marín, but because of Mariana they both end their relationship, but they are together at the end.
- Francisco Bolívar as José Luis Vargas / Jota, Godfather of Catalina Marin and long-time best friend of Albeiro.
- Juan Alfonso Baptista as Martín Cruz, he is an agent of the DEA, which in the end is discovered to be a psychopath.

=== Special guest stars ===
- Juan Pablo Llano as Daniel Cerón, he is a journalist who helps the Marín family.
- Gisella Aboumrad as Mayra Contreras, she is an inmate that La Diabla knows in jail, and turns her into her partner.
- Juan Diego Sánchez as Bayron Santana, he is the deceased son of Hilda. He only appears as an illusion that has Hilda in the mental sanatorium.
- Luces Velásquez as Imelda Beltrán, Yésica's mother.
- Juan Ángel Esparza as Villa, he is a Mexican drug trafficker.

=== Recurring characters ===
- Joselyn Gallardo as Martina, daughter of Paola. During the season she is allied with the TEA to destroy El Titi, but dies during a confrontation with El Titi.
- Estefanía Gómez as Vanessa Salazar, after seeing her daughter die, she takes revenge on Las Diablas and manages money to get and continue her courtship with Jota.
- Manuel Antonio Gómez as Esteban Calvo, he is one of the security men of La Diabla. After the confrontation he had with the Marín family in one of the mansions of La Diabla, he survives and falls in love with Hilda.
- Carolina Sepúlveda as Ximena, Valentina's mom.
- Jennifer Arenas as Valentina Fonseca, best friend of Catalina Marín, daughter of Ximena.
- Alejandra Ávila as Celia Morán, she is the secretary and lover of Anibal.
- Marilyn Patiño as Lucía Barrios, she is Daniel's girlfriend
- Óscar Salazar as Capitán Pérez, he is the commander of the police, he is a corrupt man who tries to destroy the Marín family by orders of Daniela.
- Jonathan Cabrera as Carlos Mario / El Chuky, he is one of the security men of Marcial.
- María Alejandra Pinzón as Paola Pizarro, Martina's mom.
- Laura García as López, she is the security guard where La Diabla remains while she was in prison.
- Esmeralda Pinzón as Sandra, she is a recluse, who manages to flee from prison along with La Diabla and her friends, but dies when she fled.
- Michelle Manterola as Flavia, she is one of the partners of La Diabla.
- Stephania Duque as Mariana Sanín, daughter of Catalina Santana and Santiago.
- Johan Esteban Díaz as Sebastián Sanín, son of Catalina Santana and Santiago.
- Eileen Roca as Zoraya, ex-girlfriend of Santiago, with whom he had a child out of wedlock.
- Damián Alcázar as Don Chalo, it's a Mexican narco.
- Abril Schreiber as Claudia Romero, she is a high school student, who commits suicide while trying to prostitute herself with Gato Gordo.
- Elianis Garrido as Dayana Muriel, she is the new pimp in the neighborhood.
- Julián Farietta as Gatillo, he is a hit man hired by La Diabla.
- Álvaro Benet as Miguel Díaz, is the new head of the TEA, after discovering that Martin was a psychopath.
- Luis Fernando Bohórquez as Coronel Granados, after the death of Captain Peréz, he becomes the new head of the police.

== Episodes ==
No. overall	No. in season	Title	Original release date	US viewers (millions)
91	1	"Catalina la sobreviviente"	25 July 2017	1.83
Twenty years ago; a young woman named Catalina Santana is receives multiple shot in a food court; but thanks to the medical help he received; This woman is taken to an emergency hospital where she is operated surgically, after a long operation Catalina, La Grande is saved and her recovery period begins. On the other hand, La Diabla arrives in Pereira where she presumes her new car and while she goes around the neighborhood, Hilda stops her because she needs to ask about her daughter. Agent Martin Cruz visits the doctor who operated on Catalina, La Grande because he him to want Catalina, La Grande to be declared dead, because if it is known that he survived he will be in danger.
92	2	"Nace Virginia Fernández"	26 July 2017	1.85
Catalina, La Grande manages to recover from her injuries completely and Martin visits her at the hospital to offer her a deal; after the talk with Martin, Catalina agrees to travel to the United States since she must collaborate with the justice to declare against a drug trafficker. When saying goodbye to his patient, Santiago reveals his true feelings to Catalina, La Grande. La Diabla makes a party in its new mansion and in the middle of the celebration La Diabla speaks with Octavio since it wants to propose a deal to him. When he arrives at the jail, Marcial learns that La Diabla has lied to him and Catalina, La Grande remembers everything he dreamed a long time ago. Albeiro asks Hilda not to press him to accept the she child because he does not want the happen same thing that happened to Catalina, La Grande.
93	3	"Catalina se une a la TEA"	27 July 2017	1.65
Knowing that the sale of cocaine in Europe is very well paid, La Diabla asks one of his men to bring him people to work with them. Martin arrives at Jota's house to tell him that his friend Catalina, La Grande is alive and now they need your help so that she knows how her family is doing. Santiago travels to Miami to see Catalina, La Grande and after spending time at his side, this man he asks for marriage. La Diabla convinces her friend Paola to take the drug to Spain, since the money she is going to give would get her out of all her financial problems. While working as a waitress, Catalina, La Grande meets Martin again, as it brings her very good news of her visit to Colombia. Albeiro and Hilda go to Jota's house as they feel that something could happen to he.
94	4	"Virginia escribe su destino"	28 July 2017	1.47
Martin looks for Catalina, La Grande in the restaurant and discovers that her boss tried to abuse her. After this fact, Catalina, La Grande accepts the proposal made by agent Cruz to work with him in the TEA as an undercover agent. On the other hand, Gato Gordo tells his boss that a powerful drug trafficker from Sinaloa wants to meet with her. When making the decision to work with the TEA, Catalina, La Grande asks Martin to let her return to Colombia for the last time and La Diabla learns that her friend Paola will pay four years in jail. After talking with Jota, Albeiro realizes that his compadre is lying to him again. In the middle of the airport, Octavio discovers that Catalina, La Grande is in this same place, so she decides to start following her, and Santiago receives great news.
95	5	"Veinte años después"	31 July 2017	1.54
After doing business with a well-known drug trafficker in Sinaloa, La Diabla is responsible for ensuring that the goods arrive safely at their destination. Meanwhile, Catalina is preparing to participate in an operation against this drug trafficker and La Diabla learns that his contact has been captured. After twenty years Catalina, La Grande receives the call from he friend Jota because he needs to tell her La Diabla destroyed her family and now she must make a decision to stay in Miami or return to Colombia to help them. After this call, Catalina, La Grande claims Martin for hiding what was happening in Colombia.
96	6	"Dulce justicia"	1 August 2017	1.66
Upon learning that La Diabla was alive, Catalina, La Grande changes her decision and manages to capture her with the help of the TEA. Albeiro and Hilda told Catalina and her friends that La Diabla and Daniela managed to escape; and to be able to claim the things that belong to him, Marcial asks them not to look for them. After a strong beating Catalina tells La Diabla that she will be sent to a jail to the United States and there she will pay for all the damage she did to all her loved ones. After talking with his compadres, Jota tells them to accept Marcial's proposal since all this belonged to his daughter. Meanwhile, La Diabla tries to convince Catalina, La Grande to release her and Albeiro tells her daughter to spend the night in the house that belonged to La Diabla.
97	7	"El que las hace, las paga"	2 August 2017	1.66
After the Marín family expulsed Daniela of what was she her old house, she calls the Captain to ask her to help her find her stepfather. Upon reaching the prison La Diabla begins to have problems with his she cellmate and Daniela feels helpless to know that not only lost his mother but also lost all the things that were his heritage. After the operation in Colombia; Catalina, La Grande tells Santiago that she was able to capture La Diabla and now she will pay for everything she did to her family. The captain calls Aníbal to tell her that La Diabla was brought to the United States by the TEA and now they are in trouble if she starts talking about all the businesses they did previously. After the conversation with Catalina, La Grande, Santiago feels worried about not knowing if his wife is still in love with Albeiro.
98	8	"Entre suspicacias y trampas"	3 August 2017	1.59
When Daniela arrives at her house she meets Martina as she wants to propose a new business; and when he meets El Titi, this man asks Daniela to tell him the routes that his mother used so that they could continue with the business, sending the drugs abroad. Catalina, La Pequeña talks to her doctor to find out when she can reduce her breasts and Hilda and Albeiro tell their friend they are enjoying the house that Marcial gave them; but right at that moment Catalina, La Grande calls her friend to tell her that he was able to capture La Diabla. On the other hand, Hannibal meets his people to give indications of the plans that will be carried out now.
99	9	"La nueva misión de Virginia"	4 August 2017	1.31
After being humiliated by her she cellmate, La Diabla makes a risky decision to get rid of her. For her part, Daniela tells her father that Gato Gordo and Titi are looking for her to create a new alliance. Catalina, La Pequeña talks with her friend Claudia because she wants to propose a deal that would change her life and La Diabla meets with the she director of the prison to talk about what happened with Mayra. Elsewhere, Marcial tells Hilda and her husband that she is going to give up her entire inheritance because she wants to live as before; When she arrives at the hospital, Catalina, La Pequeña realizes that her boyfriend is no longer in her room and Catalina, La Grande learns that the Titi has returned to the drug business.
100	10	"El momento de la verdad"	7 August 2017	1.80
When seeing that El Titi is in the house of Daniela, Martina feels jealous to see them together. After escaping from the hospital, Hernán Darío goes to the house of his friend Pipe's mother, since he owes half of the money they found; On the other hand, Daniela tells Titi that if she wants to have something with her, she must comply with the demands made on her; When leaving the house of Daniela, Martina makes claims to El Titi for betraying her. Later Hernán Darío, calls his girlfriend to ask him not to worry about him since he is in the house of his friend and after facing El Titi, Martina is taken to the hospital. Upon learning of what happened at Daniela's house, Marcial worries about what these two can plan; For its part, La Diabla must fulfill the mission entrusted to it by the she director of the prison or otherwise pay the consequences.
101	11	"Negocios entre enemigas"	8 August 2017	1.74
102	12	"Pasaporte a la libertad"	9 August 2017	1.63
103	13	"Estrategia amorosa"	10 August 2017	1.79
104	14	"Una chica mala"	11 August 2017	1.58
105	15	"La Diabla en control"	14 August 2017	1.59
106	16	"Amenaza de muerte"	15 August 2017	1.64
107	17	"Tumba vacía"	16 August 2017	1.70
108	18	"Sentimientos encontrados"	17 August 2017	1.60
109	19	"Fuga en marcha"	18 August 2017	1.48
110	20	"Reencuentro electrizante"	21 August 2017	1.88
111	21	"Sorpresa para Hilda"	22 August 2017	1.89
112	22	"La Diabla suelta"	23 August 2017	1.73
113	23	"Un secreto llega a su fin"	25 August 2017	1.59
114	24	"Pérdida de memoria"	28 August 2017	1.84
115	25	"Hilda, fuera de sus cabales"	29 August 2017	1.80
116	26	"De vuelta a Colombia"	30 August 2017	1.69
117	27	"Blanco equivocado"	31 August 2017	1.73
118	28	"Catalina en su terreno"	1 September 2017	1.43
119	29	"Las Catalinas se conocen"	4 September 2017	1.77
120	30	"Reencuentros y despedidas"	6 September 2017	2.01
121	31	"El dolor de El Titi"	7 September 2017	1.80
122	32	"Recuerdos con Marcial"	8 September 2017	1.54
123	33	"Hilda, a la defensiva"	11 September 2017	1.74
124	34	"Las Diablas tocan fondo"	12 September 2017	1.79
125	35	"Daniela se confiesa"	13 September 2017	1.69
126	36	"Mariana sin límites"	14 September 2017	1.60
127	37	"Estrategia de la TEA"	15 September 2017	1.48
128	38	"Las fichas de La Diabla"	18 September 2017	1.61
129	39	"Lección de madre"	19 September 2017	1.67
130	40	"Traición de socios"	20 September 2017	1.66
131	41	"Pensamientos fuera de lugar"	21 September 2017	1.63
132	42	"Cambio de planes"	22 September 2017	1.43
133	43	"El pasado revive"	25 September 2017	1.64
134	44	"Se reavivan los sentimientos"	26 September 2017	1.70
135	45	"Mariana, un ser sin alma"	27 September 2017	1.93
136	46	"Corazón partido"	28 September 2017	1.81
137	47	"El Titi, deslumbrado"	29 September 2017	1.76
138	48	"Virginia se la juega"	2 October 2017	1.78
139	49	"El dominio de Virginia"	3 October 2017	1.85
140	50	"El Titi a punto de caer"	4 October 2017	1.74
141	51	"Virginia bajo sospecha"	5 October 2017	1.74
142	52	"¿Una trampa de Martín?"	6 October 2017	N/A
143	53	"Propósitos perversos"	9 October 2017	1.70
144	54	"Virginia en graves problemas"	11 October 2017	1.79
145	55	"Plan de seducción"	12 October 2017	1.76
146	56	"Intento de fuga"	13 October 2017	N/A
147	57	"La maldad a flor de piel"	16 October 2017	1.80
148	58	"Misión imposible"	17 October 2017	N/A
149	59	"La astucia de Mariana"	18 October 2017	1.67
150	60	"La otra cara de Hilda"	19 October 2017	1.77
151	61	"Espías al acecho"	20 October 2017	1.56
152	62	"Una fría despedida"	23 October 2017	N/A
153	63	"El Titi las paga"	24 October 2017	N/A
154	64	"Madre angustiada"	25 October 2017	N/A
155	65	"Rescate sangriento"	27 October 2017	1.60
156	66	"Furia desatada"	30 October 2017	1.87
157	67	"Terreno desconocido"	31 October 2017	N/A
158	68	"La Diabla arma su ejército"	1 November 2017	1.70
159	69	"El juego de La Diabla"	2 November 2017	2.03
160	70	"Adolescente perdida"	3 November 2017	1.62
161	71	"Una rebelde e ingenua"	6 November 2017	2.11
162	72	"Marina entra en trance"	7 November 2017	1.83
163	73	"La realidad de Mariana"	8 November 2017	1.73
164	74	"La Diabla en la gloria"	9 November 2017	1.67
165	75	"La Diabla utiliza la magia negra"	10 November 2017	1.59
166	76	"El rescate de Albeiro e Hilda"	13 November 2017	1.71
167	77	"Maquinación"	14 November 2017	1.92
168	78	"El Titi prepara un agasajo"	15 November 2017	1.63
169	79	"Conjuros y rituales"	16 November 2017	1.51
170	80	"El sufrimiento y la furia"	17 November 2017	1.67
171	81	"El coraje de una madre"	20 November 2017	1.65
172	82	"La otra cara de Chalo"	21 November 2017	1.64
173	83	"Maleficio"	22 November 2017	1.70
174	84	"Morbosa obsesión"	23 November 2017	1.03
Albeiro begins to feel the first effects of witchcraft. La Diabla tells Daniela that she should not get involved with El Chalo; although he begins to approach her more and more. Hilda tells Calvo that she has just finished her relationship with her husband and Albeiro suffers because of Hilda's decision. After what Paola told them, Ximena thinks about taking care of her daughter at all times and the Colonel tells Jota and Daniel that they can go home. Upon arriving home, Catalina, La Pequeña learns that her mother made the decision to end the relationship with her father and also learns that she left with the Calvo. Paola prepares to say goodbye to her daughter.
175	85	"Bajo el efecto del hechizo"	24 November 2017	1.44
El Chalo is looking for Daniela since he wants to offer his help in the reign. The teacher asks Catalina if she thought about the proposal she made since otherwise she will not be able to graduate. Albeiro again begins to feel strong pains and La Diabla asks a very special request to the witch; since he wants Albeiro to fall once and for all at his feet. After fulfilling the part of his deal, El Chalo assures Daniela that the crown will be for her. Catalina, La Pequeña asks her friends to record with their cell phones everything that is going to happen with El Profesor and Titi tries to surprise Mariana at her birthday party.
176	86	"Malas influencias"	27 November 2017	1.78
La Diabla asks her daughter to take care of going by Calvo since they need a trustworthy man. The teacher meets the conditions when he realizes what Valentina and Catalina, La Pequeña are capable of doing. After this, Catalina, La Grande congratulates her mother because her sister managed to graduate and Hilda takes advantage of this moment to tell everyone that Albeiro has called to insult them, in the middle of the celebration all the people feel surprised to see that Daniela also graduated. After this event, Catalina, La Pequeña shows her dad her bachelor's degree; but Albeiro asks him to forget about him. Meanwhile, Mariana takes a pregnancy test to confirm if she can get pregnant and Lucía when she sees the state of Albeiro, she believes that La Diabla did something to her.
177	87	"La corona tiene precio"	28 November 2017	2.03
Upon returning to Colombia, Santiago seeks Catalina, La Grande to apologize for having been carried away by his anger and have ended their marriage. On the other hand, Valentina looks for who are the jurors of the reign; and discovering who these people are, Catalina, La Pequeña feels worried because Daniela can buy the crown. After this, Catalina, La Grande gives a very special surprise to her sister as all the people of the neighborhood will accompany her during her presentation in the reign and in the middle of the press conference Daniel Cerón is in charge of unmasking Daniela making her some strong questions. Catalina asks her sister to stay calm since the TEA is going to perform an operation to capture La Diabla once and for all.
