= Sin senos sí hay paraíso season 3 =

Sin senos sí hay paraíso
- Season 3
- Promotional poster
- Starring: Carmen Villalobos; Catherine Siachoque; Fabián Ríos; Majida Issa; Carolina Gaitán; Roberto Manrique; Gregorio Pernía; Javier Jattin; Juan Pablo Urrego; Francisco Bolívar; Juan Alfonso Baptista
- No. of episodes: 63

Release
- Original network: Telemundo
- Original release: 12 June – 10 September 2018

Season chronology
- ← Previous; Season 2 Next → Season 4

The third season of Sin senos sí hay paraíso, a Colombian-American television series created by Gustavo Bolívar, that premiered on Telemundo on 12 June 2018 and concluded on 10 September 2018.

The start of production of the third season was confirmed from November 2017, and concluded on 19 April 2018.

== Premise ==
The season begins with the expected results of the departmental beauty contest of Colombia, and revolves around the doubts that remained in the previous season, about the curse that persecutes the daughters of "Las Chicas del Barrio", the spell of Albeiro (Fabián Ríos) and the confusion of Catalina, La Grande (Carmen Villalobos), for her love for El Titi (Gregorio Pernía) and Albeiro. As well as the conflict between Hernán Darío (Juan Pablo Urrego), and Catalina, La Pequeña (Carolina Gaitán) about Mariana's pregnancy, and the return of Martín (Juan Alfonso Baptista), who has returned to take revenge on Catalina, La Grande for having handed him over to the authorities.

=== Synopsis ===
The time has come to choose the most beautiful girl in the region. The catwalk has become a battlefield. The support of the Marín family towards Catalina La Pequeña (Carolina Gaitán) and Yésica Beltrán (Majida Issa) towards her daughter is immense as she is willing to do anything to see her daughter Daniela (Johanna Fadul) crowned as queen of the region. Yésica, who attends the event disguised as her sister, Amparo, has come in contact with the juries and seeks to bribe them to tilt their vote in favor of Daniela. But Catalina La Pequeña stands out not only for her beauty, but for her intelligence. The result of this contest will define the course of their lives. Catalina La Pequeña's and Hernán Darío's relationship (Juan Pablo Urrego) is threatened by Mariana's obsession. She will give birth to a beautiful girl and continue to claim that she is the daughter of Hernán Darío. Catalina La Pequeña doubt of the paternity of Hernán Darío and will do everything in his power to decipher the identity of the true father. It will not be an easy battle and Mariana will do everything possible to snatch the love of her life to Catalina La Pequeña.

On the other hand, the fearsome curse of the witch Abigail materializes. Catalina La Grande (Carmen Villalobos) and her friends know that their daughters are in danger. Adriana, Vanessa's daughter died, as did Martina, Paola's daughter, and now Catalina La Grande will have to redouble her efforts to take care of Mariana, while Ximena will take care of the steps of her daughter, Valentina. In this battle against evil they will have many allies but there is no lack of enemies.

== Cast ==
=== Main ===
- Carmen Villalobos as Catalina Santana
- Catherine Siachoque as Hilda Santana
- Fabián Ríos as Albeiro Marín
- Majida Issa as Yésica Beltrán
- Carolina Gaitán as Catalina Marín
- Roberto Manrique as Santiago Sanín
- Gregorio Pernía as Aurelio Jaramillo
- Javier Jattin as Tony Campana
- Juan Pablo Urrego as Hernán Darío
- Francisco Bolívar as José Luis Vargas
- Juan Alfonso Baptista as Martín Cruz

=== Recurring ===
- Estefanía Gómez as Vanessa Salazar
- Mauricio Mejía as Carlos
- Marilyn Patiño as Lucía Barrios
- Jennifer Arenas as Valentina Fonseca
- Stephania Duque as Mariana Sanín
- Johan Esteban Díaz as Sebastián Sanín
- Manuel Antonio Gómez as Esteban Calvo
- Elianis Garrido as Dayana Muriel
- Carolina Sepúlveda as Ximena Fonseca
- María Alejandra Pinzón as Paola Pizarro
- Andrea Pita as Laura
- Patricia Maldonado as Abigail
- Luis Fernando Bohórquez as Coronel Granados
- Emilia Ceballos as Yamile
- Rubén Arciniegas as El Chalo
- Ricardo Henao as Gabriel
- Alejandra Monsalve as Sandra
- Milena Granados as Margarita

=== Special guest stars ===
- Dennis Fernando as Himself
- Juan Angel Esparza as Carmelo Villa
- Juan Pablo Llano as Daniel Cerón
- Eileen Roca as Zoraya
- Johanna Fadul as Daniela Barrera

== Episodes ==
No. overall	No. in season	Title	Original release date	US viewers (millions)
178	1	"Catalina gana el reinado"	12 June 2018	1.68
While everyone is anxiously awaiting the results of the finalists for Miss Risaralda's contest, La Diabla tries to get her sister out of the event as soon as possible. On the other hand Hilda asks Albeiro what was done to him since his attitude is very strange; but right at that moment Albeiro is out of control because he needs to be next to La Diabla, since the spell they did to him brings him crazy. In another place, Catalina Santana and the rest of the agents find out that there are two women who are very similar to Daniela's aunt so one of them can be La Diabla. After listening to the answers of the finalists, one of the women members of the jury tells her partner that they have her threatened with death if she does not choose Daniela as the winner. After knowing the results of the contest winner, Daniela decides to go to her room and cuts her wrists.
179	2	"La Diabla pierde a Daniela"	13 June 2018	1.46
After finding Daniela seriously wounded, La Diabla takes her daughter to a hospital to be treated as soon as possible; but seeing with her own eyes that doctors can not do anything for her daughter, she decides to take her daughter to her home where she expects her daughter to be seen by her trusted doctor, but it's too late. Elsewhere, Albeiro asks Hilda and his daughter for help since he can not get La Diabla out of his head. After her participation in the beauty contest, Dayana tells Titi that she is not happy with the judges' decision. Mariana is taken to the hospital after she feels labor pains. Hilda looks for her eldest daughter to tell her that she believes someone is doing witchcraft on Albeiro.
180	3	"Asignan refuerzos a Catalina"	14 June 2018	1.47
The head of the T.E.A is looking for Catalina to tell him that Martin managed to escape from the maximum security prison and that because of this situation he will have a new shooting guard, since Martin will not take long to get revenge for what they did to him. In another place, Catalina Marin tells her mother that she feels very sad with the arrival of the baby of her boyfriend and that of her niece. When she meets her daughter, Hernán Darío learns that Mariana decided to name her daughter Catalina. Dayana goes to the hospital to give a very important reason to Catalina Santana about El Titi. After reuniting with Albeiro, La Diabla asks him what he is feeling for Hilda and her daughters.
181	4	"La Diabla embalsama a Daniela"	15 June 2018	1.22
Upon meet with Villa, Martín informs him of the route used by La Diabla and his partner to send drugs to the United States. After knowing the baby of La Diabla, Albeiro he becomes attached to him and promises to be by his side since he always yearns to have a son. Catalina Santana looks for Vanessa to tell her that she was finally able to tell Santiago about the witch's curse and Dayana tells El Titi that she was able to convince Catalina Santana to visit him. La Diabla takes Daniela's body out to take a walk the streets of the neighborhood where they lived for a couple of years. After seeing a letter from Martin himself in his room Catalina Santana goes into despair.
182	5	"La pesadilla de Catalina"	18 June 2018	1.49
After finding Martin's letter in his room, Catalina Santana begins to look for him throughout his house, but while walking through the corridors she remembers the words of his her friends and Catalina Santana calls Santiago to ask him not to neglect Mariana and her granddaughter since they both may be in danger. On the other hand Catalina Marín asks Hernán Darío what is going to happen now with the arrival of her daughter as she thinks that this would bring problems for the dreams they have as a couple. Jota tells his wife that he is sure that something bad is happening to Albeiro and that he will not rest until he knows what it is. Valentina asks her mother for an explanation of why she is obsessing about taking care of her at all times. Meanwhile, Ximena tells Paola and Vanessa that they must meet with La Diabla in order to discover the reason for the curse. Zoraya appears in the hospital and finds Santiago together with Catalina Santana.
183	6	"Albeiro quiere casarse"	19 June 2018	1.43
After leaving the clinic, Mariana asks her mother to think things through as she has the right to make her life with Hernán Darío. On the other hand, listening to the doctor's instructions La Diabla tells Yamile that for a few more days she will stay by her son's side. Vanesa Paola and Ximena propose to Jota that they let them go to look for La Diabla to talk about the curse that falls on their daughters. Realizing that Albeiro is in danger, Catalina Santana decides to risk his integrity as long as he does not commit a madness and Margarita arrives at the house of dona Hilda to ask for her help as she discovered who was the person who took her brother and his wife.
184	7	"Se rompe el hechizo de Albeiro"	20 June 2018	1.42
After hearing that La Diabla hired a belly to get pregnant, Albeiro questions she him for having made that decision. When opening one of the windows of her room Valentina is kidnapped by Martin. Catalina Marín looks for her godfather to tell her that she can not take it anymore to see Hernan Dario with her daughter and she is also sure that her father is doing witchcraft. In another place Catalina Santana takes advantage of the visit to her mother's house to ask her if she is still in love with Albeiro; But after talking about the situation he is going through, Hilda asks her daughter if she still feels something for him. Realizing that Valentina is not in her room Ximena is looking for her friends to help her find her.
185	8	"Le disparan a Albeiro"	21 June 2018	1.53
After having shot the witch, La Diabla learns that Albeiro can stop loving her and because of this La Diabla calls her man of trust to ask her to look for her husband and tie him up before he escapes. On the other hand, Catalina Santana tells Tony that they should get more escorts since her daughter is in serious danger or else she will be forced to leave the country. After this Catalina Santana gathers the women of her family to tell them that Martín is in the city; but also wants to talk about the curse that falls on the girls in the neighborhood. Elsewhere, Yamile tries to take advantage of the fact that La Diabla is not at home to try to escape and Martin tells Valentina that if she behaves well nothing bad will happen to her.
186	9	"Catalina va por La Diabla"	22 June 2018	1.15
After Albeiro received several shots, La Diabla calls his trusted doctor to heal his wounds. On the other hand, Yamile tells Hilda that La Diabla made a deal with her to have a child because she wanted to deceive the man she is living with. Elsewhere Tony introduces Catalina Santana to the two new escorts who will take care of the safety of his daughter and granddaughter. Martín visits Valentina to tell her that for a couple of hours she will be alone but when he returns he does not want to take any surprise. El Calvo meets with El Cerdo to ask him to help him with important information he needs about La Diabla.
187	10	"Entre la espada y la pared"	25 June 2018	1.62
Daniel communicates with the Colonel Granados to tell him that his research team found the house of the witch Abigail and is sure that this woman could help them a lot to clarify the death of the neighborhood girls and also help them resolve the disappearance of Valentina. In another place, Hernán Darío tells to Catalina Marín that he is going to be absent from classes again since he has to visit his daughter and after a long journey Yamile manages to locate the house of La Diabla. For his part, La Diabla prepares a very special surprise to welcome Chalo and Cerdo communicates with El Calvo to tell him that he is in serious trouble since La Diabla is beginning to suspect that Yamile escaped from his house with her son.
188	11	"El Titi quiere casarse"	26 June 2018	1.47
While talking with Catalina Santana about her daughter, Santiago takes advantage of the moment to tell her the true reasons why she is living with Zoraya; but also wants to know if the relationship they had still has some salvation. On the other hand, El Calvo receives a message from La Diabla where he accepts that he will return to work for her, but in return he must comply with two very important conditions. When returning to his house, Santiago realizes that Zoraya cut his wrists and El Chalo asks La Diabla to tell him the truth of what is happening on his house, since he himself heard the shots. Upon entering the witch's house, authorities discover a dead woman and Paola confirms that this woman is Abigail.
189	12	"La Diabla se sale con la suya"	27 June 2018	1.51
Realizing that her sister left the house, Dayana orders her mother to look for her throughout the neighborhood, because if she does not fulfill her part of the deal she would be in serious trouble with El Titi. Elsewhere, Mariana tells her mom that she does not believe in the truce Catalina Marín proposed and is more certain that she is planning to do something against she and her baby. After talking with La Diabla, El Calvo looks for ways to get Yamile's son out of the house without raising any suspicion. Colonel Granados meets with Catalina Santana to show him some evidence that they managed to find in the office of the witch Abigail and also tells him that La Diabla is apparently behind her death.
190	13	"El Titi complica a Catalina"	28 June 2018	1.42
When going to the place mentioned with Catalina Santana, Dayana asks him to cover his face for security reasons. On the other hand La Diabla communicates with El Calvo so that they meet as soon as possible; But as she prepares to leave the house, Hilda tells her that she knows he is hiding something from her since lately she has noticed that her way of being changed radically. When seeing herself again with Catalina Santana, El Titi welcomes the one she also hopes to be her home. While reviewing the witch Abigail's house, the Colonel Granados discovers a note that speaks of the curse that Catalina mentioned earlier. On the other hand, Sandra tells her friend that she helped her get a geneticist to talk about the DNA test she wants to do to her niece's baby.
191	14	"La Diabla mata a Chalo"	29 June 2018	1.30
After receiving a call La Diabla tells El Calvo that there was a change of plans and now she needs your help to end Chalo and in return Hilda's life would be forgiven. On the other hand, the doctor who is seeing Albeiro tries to explain to Chalo why he is in the Diabla house. After talking to geneticist Catalina Marín, she tells her friend Sandra that she is thinking about which sample she can take to test her niece's DNA without Mariana suspecting and Tony tells her boss that she feels very distressed already. that Catalina Santana is in serious danger on the house of El Titi. Finally, Liseth communicates with her mother to tell her that she can not go home because she will not allow her sister to sell her for any reason.
192	15	"La Diabla tiene cómo negociar"	2 July 2018	1.40
Upon learning that Chalo took Daniela's body from his altar and burned it, La Diabla despairs and starts looking for him in every corner of his estate. In another place, Catalina communicates with Hernán Darío to ask her to stay with Mariana and her daughter because she does not want them to be unprotected. On the other hand, Hilda tells Margarita that she feels very bad about what happened with Esteban; but just at that moment Esteban he communicates with Hilda to talk about what he truly feels towards her. In the middle of the investigation of the witch's house Abigail, the Colonel Granados shows Ximena and her friends a room where they discovered a chest with some photos; which leads them to discover a secret of their past.
193	16	"Catalina y su misión peligrosa"	3 July 2018	1.33
After finishing with Chalo, La Diabla tells Calvo that only three people can know where his body was buried. On the other hand, El Titi prepares a very special breakfast for Catalina Santana and thus welcome her home; but she asks him to let her look for her children, since she has to say goodbye to them. Ximena tells her best friend that she could not sleep all night thinking about the curse; but at that moment Paola arrives to tell them that she finally discovered why the witch Abigail retaliated against her. On the other hand Liseth tells Catalina Marín and Hernan Dario that she thought about seeing her mother and La Diabla tells Albeiro that she has something very important to be able to negotiate with the TEA.
194	17	"Catalina se juega la vida"	4 July 2018	0.99
Upon returning home, Catalina Santana tries to explain to Mariana why she is risking everything to save other people's lives. On the other hand, La Diabla confesses to Calvo that he had to resort to witchcraft to have Albeiro by his side. Liseth realizing that Dayana found her, tries to run away since she is not willing to let her own sister prostitute her. After talking to her daughter and her ex-husband, Catalina Santana, she communicates with her boss to tell her that she has a plan that could help them capture the Titi once and for all and now she needs your approval to be able to carry it out. On the other hand, Ximena, Paola and Vanessa tell Daniel and his wife about the curse they have over them and now they need their help to find Laura's family.
195	18	"La Diabla contacta a El Titi"	5 July 2018	1.43
Upon learning that the plan did not work, Catalina Santana asked her escort to take care of putting a GPS in Cabra's truck, since she has no choice but to return to the house of El Titi. On the other hand, El Calvo one realizes that there are two policemen waiting in the door of the church and Dayana tells her boss that her sister refused to see him; but while I was chasing her to fulfill her obligation, she was hit by a car. Later the head of the TEA communicates with the Colonel Granados to ask again for help as one of his agents managed to place a device inside one of the trucks of the Titi. Albeiro thinks it is time to look for Hilda and take her baby with her.
196	19	"Catalina le da el sí a El Titi"	6 July 2018	1.28
After reuniting with Dayana, La Diabla requires her to communicate with her boss as soon as possible and after receiving a call El Titi tells Catalina Santana that the person who contacted her was one of her enemies. On the other hand, Albeiro tries to escape from the house of La Diabla in the company of his son. Miguel and Tony meet with the Colonel Granados to mount the operation that will help them capture El Titi as soon as possible; but in the middle of the conversation the Colonel Granados tells the agents that he has everything ready to enter the house where the Diabla is hidden. In another place, Catalina Marín and Hernán Daríio threaten Dayana with reporting her to the authorities when she learned that Liseth had an accident because of her.
197	20	"Catalina salva a Mariana"	9 July 2018	1.47
Upon realizing that a strange man entered the house, Mariana communicates with her mother to inform her of the situation and after learning of this fact; Catalina Santana communicates with Tony to demand an explanation of why he failed to comply with his orders and left his daughter and granddaughter unprotected. Elsewhere, La Diabla tells El Calvo that they are going to look for Albeiro at Hilda's house since she is sure that he can be in this place and now he does not mind being in danger. On the other hand, Hilda meets her daughter at the hospital and tells her that her father is seriously injured; but also came home with a baby in his arms.
198	21	"Catalina amenaza a El Titi"	10 July 2018	1.51
When discovering the very Titi in the house of Catalina Santana, Tony communicates with his team to tell them the situation as he believes that this is the perfect opportunity to capture him. In the middle of a tense discussion, Mariana looks for her mother and seeing her El Titi is surprised that Mariana is the daughter of the woman he is in love with. On the other hand Margarita looking for Jota and Vanessa to tell them that Albeiro returned to the house but because he was in very poor condition had to transfer him to the hospital and she La Diabla and Calvo took his nephew out of his hands. Upon meeting Mariana's daughter, Titi asks Catalina to enlist everything they need, since the three of them are going to live with him.
199	22	"Catalina caza a La Diabla"	11 July 2018	1.48
Realizing that Albeiro is in grave danger, Hilda her daughter and the rest of her friends go to the clinic to prevent the Bald from ending his life. On the other hand, the Titi flees from his home to ask Villa for help since the authorities can find him at any time. After capturing El Calvo, the Colonel Granados is responsible for preparing an operation for this subject to direct them to the place where La Diabla is hidden; but he refuses to give them any information until he talks to Hilda. In another place, Mariana communicates with her dad to tell her that she had to flee from her house and now she is in a hotel with her baby and Tony asks his team to think of a strategy before facing El Titi.
200	23	"Catalina captura a La Diabla"	12 July 2018	1.60
After capturing Calvo, Catalina Santana is in charge of directing the operation to arrest La Diabla; but when she sees, he assures Catalina Santana that she is immortal and is not willing to be separated from her son. Elsewhere, the Titi tells Villa that La Diabla sought him to propose that they be seen as soon as possible. After helping with the capture of La Diabla, Catalina asks her boss to let her leave the operation to catch El Titi as it could do a lot of damage to his family. On the other hand, Mariana tells her dad that there is no time to go back to live in Miami with her daughter and Hernan Dario and upon entering the house of the Titi and discover that this escape, Miguel asks Catalina for an explanation.
201	24	"La Diabla nunca se rinde"	13 July 2018	1.31
After being stopped by the police La Diabla asks the Colonel Granados to contact her with someone from the TEA since she knows the exact location of where El Chalo is located. Upon learning that Carlos may be involved with the curse that falls on his daughter and the neighborhood girls, Hilda decides to go with his friends to help them find their whereabouts as soon as possible. In another place Mariana tells her mom that she organized a small meeting so she can talk alone with her dad and Miguel communicates with his superior to tell him that La Diabla is apparently telling him the truth and if he knows where one is of the most important drug traffickers in the world.
202	25	"Un ultimátum para La Diabla"	16 July 2018	1.38
For the deal between the TEA and La Diabla comes true, she has to be extradited to the United States. Dayana wants Catalina, La Mediana's head and seduces Villa to kill her.
203	26	"Martín planea cocinar a Lucía"	17 July 2018	1.36
Pregnant and kidnapped by Martín, Lucía does not know the hell that awaits her, when the cannibal prepares her dish for the day. Santiago asks Catalina to marry him again, with a ring.
204	27	"Catalina vuelve con Santiago"	18 July 2018	1.47
Santiago bursts with happiness, when the love of his life and the mother of his children, agrees to marry him again. They decide to recover their family. La Diabla arrives at the maximum security bunker.
205	28	"Albeiro piensa en Catalina"	19 July 2018	1.42
Very confused with his feelings, Albeiro can not get Catalina out of his head and loneliness makes him call her, to hear her voice. Meanwhile, she spends a night of passion with Santiago.
206	29	"Albeiro deja atrás a Catalina"	20 July 2018	1.23
Albeiro admits to Santiago, that Catalina has always been his great love, but he will not stir up the past. He is aware that Hilda is now his reality. Carlos Jaramillo appears in a madhouse.
207	30	"Nachi no se alejará de su hija"	23 July 2018	1.53
Catalina and Santiago tell Hernán Darío that they are returning to Miami and fear for the life of their daughter and granddaughter. They offer help with the visa, so he can visit the girl.
208	31	"Nacho no es padre"	24 July 2018	1.42
Catalina delivers the DNA results to Nachito and now nothing stands between them. La Diabla does not accept the proposal of the TEA: they offer a reduced sentence of five years.
209	32	"Hernán Darío encara a Mariana"	25 July 2018	1.53
Mariana refuses to corroborate with another DNA test, that Hernán Darío is the father of Catalina, La Bebé. Hilda talks to Albeiro about Carlos and agrees to help him.
210	33	"Catalina sufre por Ximena"	26 July 2018	1.62
Dayana leaves her mom's house to move in Villa's house. Elsewhere, Hernan Dario visits the laboratory, where Catalina "the small" got the DNA results, and a doctor confirms him that the DNA results are genuine. Elsewhere, Paola shows her concern about Ximena's disappearance and calls Catalina to learn if she knows about Ximena. Catalina then goes to look for Ximena at her house. While knocking on the main door, the colonel comes about and tells her on Ximena's death, making Catalina burst into tears. After a while, Catalina makes a call to Jota, unable to utter a word. Albeiro learns about Catalina's mysterious phone call and makes a call back to Catalina to ask her about the call. She informs him on Ximena's death and then Albeiro informs Hilda, Jota, Paola and Vanessa on Ximena's death, making them burst into tears. When Jota makes a mention about the links between the episode and the second curse, all of them get a shock. Elsewhere, Dayana tells Titi about her plan to kill Villa.
211	34	"Titi pasa el dato a Catalina"	27 July 2018	1.40
Titi calls Catalina to warn her that her sister is in danger, because the number 2 narco-trafficker from Mexico issued an order to kill her daughter, forcing Catalina to come back to work for TEA. Meanwhile, after confirmation on the authenticity of the DNA results, Hernan Dario proposes to Catalina (the small) and then both have sex. Elsewhere, Albeiro and Hilda go to the mental hospital to pick Carlos up but he turns aggressive after remembering some episodes. Meanwhile, Jota and Paola go to the old house only to find the old man, Manuel, who told them about the curse, in skeleton form and they rush to the police station. Elsewhere, Catalina goes to visit her daughter to warn her about the death threat. Catalina "the small" connects many episodes together to conclude Dayana is behind the death threat.
212	35	"Mariana se quita la máscara"	30 July 2018	1.48
Catalina slaps Mariana, after admitting that her granddaughter is from another man. In addition, she rubs her past, because she worked in prostitution. Zoraya points to Santiago with a gun.
213	36	"El Titi en la mira de Catalina"	31 July 2018	1.61
Catalina discovers that El Titi got involved with her daughter and that he is the biological father of her granddaughter. Now more than ever, she goes with everything and is determined to capture him. Mariana asks to ally with Dayana.
214	37	"Mariana renuncia a su hija"	1 August 2018	1.60
Aware that she can not be a good mother, Mariana flees, to live the life she wants. She says goodbye with a letter and lets her parents take care of her baby. Paola disappears.
215	38	"El Titi se entera que es padre"	2 August 2018	1.55
El Titi is speechless, when Mariana says he is a father and the idea of having an heiress intrigues him. He's willing to give his daughter his last name, Catalina Jaramillo. Paola is in the hands of Laura.
216	39	"Mariana tiene aliados"	3 August 2018	1.38
With thirst for revenge, Mariana with El Titi and Dayana plan to bombard the house of Hernán Darío and make it fly in pieces with Catalina, La Mediana. La Diabla has a hidden enemy.
217	40	"Emboscada contra La Diabla"	6 August 2018	1.43
El Titi and Villa have the data, that La Diabla will be extradited to the United States and to make sure she will not betray them, they decide to kill her, before she gets on the plane. Daniel wakes up in the hospital.
218	41	"La Diabla camino a su fin"	7 August 2018	1.52
The TEA moves to La Diabla in a caravan. The thugs who El Titi hired wait for her, to shoot her with a bazooka and execute the most powerful drug trafficker.
219	42	"La Diabla sobrevive el ataque"	8 August 2018	1.48
After receiving the impact of the bazooka, in the middle of a bloody scene, La Diabla with her disfigured face, flees without knowing where to go. Mariana learns that her daughter is in danger.
220	43	"Explota la casa de Nachito"	9 August 2018	1.49
El Titi and Mariana spend tremendous fright, knowing that their baby is in danger and run to rescue her. Catalina, La Mediana and the girl are saved. Nachito is seriously injured.
221	44	"Nachi al borde de la muerte"	10 August 2018	1.39
The doctors fight to save the life of Hernán Darío, after the impact of the bomb. Unconscious, he remembers what he has lived. Catalina, La Grande is reunited with her father.
222	45	"Catalina acusa a Mariana"	13 August 2018	1.37
Upon hearing that only a miracle can save Hernán Darío, Catalina, La Mediana has reasons, to accuse Mariana, of being responsible for the explosion and as such, must pay. Paola appears.
223	46	"La maldición rodea a Catalina"	14 August 2018	1.38
Catalina, La Grande and the others, do not know that Paola is under Laura's spell. Possessed, she imagines causing an accident on the road, where everyone dies. Zoraya has another identity.
224	47	"Albeiro en brazos de Catalina"	15 August 2018	1.30
Albeiro gives a big hug to Catalina La Grande, after she thanks him for his solidarity. Hilda begins to doubt, when she sees them together. Zoraya and Mateo leave their past behind.
225	48	"Albeiro se sincera con Hilda"	16 August 2018	1.43
Albeiro confesses to Hilda that he will never forget Catalina, La Grande, for being his first love; he opens his heart and tells her never to doubt that he loves her. El Titi meets his daughter.
226	49	"Titi no se apartará de su hija"	17 August 2018	1.17
Titi is excited to have his little daughter in his arms. He promises to be a good father and always treat her like a princess.
227	50	"Catalina recibe un ascenso"	20 August 2018	1.40
Catalina, La Grande receives the opportunity of her career, when the TEA offers her to be the new director, in Colombia. Zoraya knows the data of her mission.
228	51	"Mariana traiciona a su madre"	21 August 2018	1.47
El Titi explodes with fury, because Mariana dares to reveal that Catalina Santana is an agent of the TEA. The drug dealer can not believe that the love of his life deceived him.
229	52	"Catalina se apega al deber"	22 August 2018	1.39
Regretfully, Catalina, La Grande confesses that she will persecute her own daughter, like any other drug trafficker. A face transplant would be the only solution for La Diabla.
230	53	"La Diabla destapa su rostro"	23 August 2018	1.47
Yésica Beltrán confronts the harsh reality by removing the bandages and seeing the last thing that was left of her, after being so close to death. They bury Ximena.
231	54	"Hernán Darío despierta"	24 August 2018	1.20
Nachito believes that he does not have much time to live and his last wish is to marry his only love, he ask's to bring a priest, for the wedding. La Diabla decides to change her face. Titi demands a DNA test.
232	55	"Donante de cara para Yésica"	27 August 2018	1.45
The doctor agrees to operate at La Diabla, when she agrees to pay anything for the surgery; but before, she asks him to get a new identity and a donor. Catalina celebrates her new position.
233	56	"Mariana aspira ser como Yésica"	28 August 2018	1.40
El Titi asks Mariana what she would like to study and she insists on learning the drug trafficking business. She wants her mother to chase her. Ana Paula is blackmailed by Felipe.
234	57	"Mariana es la narco más joven"	29 August 2018	1.45
El Titi is surprised to hear that Mariana detests her mother and will do the impossible, to take revenge on her. Mariana shows that she is serious, pointing a gun at Titi. Jota loses the trial.
235	58	"Yésica elige su nuevo rostro"	30 August 2018	1.31
La Diabla refuses to have the face of a corpse and orders Calvo to bring a striking woman. The matón sends her photos and she chooses the indicated one. Catalina's gets prepared for her wedding.
236	59	"Catalina y Nachito se casan"	3 September 2018	1.45
After multiple obstacles, Catalina, La Mediana and Nachito get married in the hospital chapel. He fulfills his dream, but he suffers a relapse. Mariana seeks to create her women's cartel.
237	60	"Catalina está embarazada"	4 September 2018	1.42
In the midst of so much suffering for Nachito, Catalina, La Mediana faints and discovers that she expects a child, from the love of her life. La Diabla has her face transplant done. Mariana faces her mother.
238	61	"Santiago muerde el anzuelo"	5 September 2018	1.48
Following Zoraya's instructions, Santiago goes to the motel where he thinks Catalina, La Grande and her escort are. When he arrives, he sees Tony stabbed, tries to save him and the police arrest him.
239	62	"Catalina desconfía de Santiago"	6 September 2018	1.47
Catalina does not believe Santiago, after seeing all the evidence that involves him: they accuse him of a relationship with Tony and his murder. Albeiro comforts her. Daniel kills Martin.
240	63	"La Diabla, escolta de Catalina"	10 September 2018	1.69
Catalina would never imagine, that her worst enemy will be so close to her. La Diabla with her new face, infiltrates the TEA, as Valeria Montes, to replace Tony. Albeiro seeks his love.
