= List of Sin senos sí hay paraíso episodes =

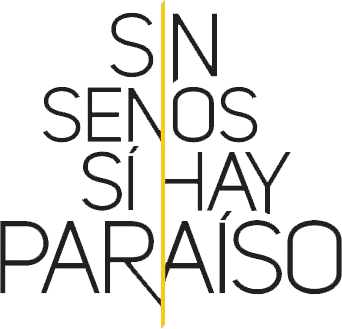
https://www.investingespanol.com

Sin senos sí hay paraíso, also known as Sin tetas sí hay paraíso, is a Spanish-language telenovela produced by Fox Telecolombia and Telemundo Studios for Telemundo, based on the book Sin tetas sí hay paraíso of the writer Gustavo Bolívar. It is also a sequel to Sin senos no hay paraíso produced in 2008. It premiered on Telemundo on 19 July 2016.

On 28 November 2016, the series was renewed for a second season. On 4 October 2017, the series was renewed for a third season. On 25 January 2023, Telemundo renewed the series for a fourth season that premiered on 16 November 2026.

As of 20 November 2026, 244 episodes of Sin senos sí hay paraíso have aired, currently in its fourth season.

== Series overview ==
| Series | Episodes | Originally released | |
| Series | Episodes | First released | Last released |
|---|---|---|---|
| 1 | 90 | 19 July 2016 | 28 November 2016 |
| 2 | 87 | 25 July 2017 | 28 November 2017 |
| 3 | 63 | 12 June 2018 | 10 September 2018 |
| 4 | TBA | 16 November 2026 | TBA |

== Episodes ==
=== Season 1 (2016) ===
| No. overall | No. in season | Title | Original release date | US viewers (millions) |
|---|---|---|---|---|
| 1 | 1 | "Nace Catalina chica" | 19 July 2016 | 2.47 |
| 2 | 2 | "Catalina ama a Hernán" | 20 July 2016 | N/A |
| 3 | 3 | "Arrestan a la familia de Catalina" | 21 July 2016 | N/A |
| 4 | 4 | "Catalina sufre torturas" | 22 July 2016 | N/A |
| 5 | 5 | "Catalina trata de escapar" | 25 July 2016 | N/A |
| 6 | 6 | "Catalina saca las uñas" | 26 July 2016 | N/A |
| 7 | 7 | "Nachito le vende el alma al diablo" | 27 July 2016 | N/A |
| 8 | 8 | "Catalina queda libre" | 28 July 2016 | N/A |
| 9 | 9 | "Catalina jura vengarse" | 29 July 2016 | N/A |
| 10 | 10 | "Catalina amenaza a Daniela" | 1 August 2016 | N/A |
| 11 | 11 | "Catalina hace negocio con Martina" | 2 August 2016 | N/A |
| 12 | 12 | "Catalina culpa a sus padres" | 3 August 2016 | N/A |
| 13 | 13 | "Nachito ruega por su vida" | 4 August 2016 | N/A |
| 14 | 14 | "La Diabla amenaza a Nachito" | 5 August 2016 | N/A |
| 15 | 15 | "Nachito dice que ama a Daniela" | 8 August 2016 | N/A |
| 16 | 16 | "Nachito no quiere ser un matón" | 9 August 2016 | N/A |
| 17 | 17 | "Daniela ayuda a Nacho a escapar" | 10 August 2016 | N/A |
| 18 | 18 | "Catalina se deja regalar" | 11 August 2016 | N/A |
| 19 | 19 | "Albeiro acepta ir a la cita secreta" | 12 August 2016 | N/A |
| 20 | 20 | "Hilda y Albeiro se unen a Marcial" | 15 August 2016 | N/A |
| 21 | 21 | "Nachito acepta matar al coronel" | 16 August 2016 | N/A |
| 22 | 22 | "Nachito listo para ser un asesino" | 17 August 2016 | 1.73 |
| 23 | 23 | "Nachito da un paso irreversible" | 18 August 2016 | N/A |
| 24 | 24 | "Catalina, en la boca del lobo" | 19 August 2016 | 1.49 |
| 25 | 25 | "La Diabla aloja a Nachito" | 22 August 2016 | 1.69 |
| 26 | 26 | "Catalina conoce una dura verdad" | 23 August 2016 | 1.67 |
| 27 | 27 | "Catalina habla con Pelambre" | 24 August 2016 | 1.58 |
| 28 | 28 | "Lucía corre peligro" | 26 August 2016 | 1.47 |
| 29 | 29 | "Catalina acorralada" | 29 August 2016 | 1.44 |
| 30 | 30 | "Pelambre se cobra venganza" | 30 August 2016 | 1.81 |
| 31 | 31 | "¿Logrará Nachito ver a Catalina?" | 31 August 2016 | 1.77 |
| 32 | 32 | "Catalina, la grande estaría viva" | 1 September 2016 | N/A |
| 33 | 33 | "Catalina secuestrada" | 5 September 2016 | 1.52 |
| 34 | 34 | "Marcial secuestra a su hija" | 6 September 2016 | 1.76 |
| 35 | 35 | "Una nueva Catalina" | 7 September 2016 | 1.81 |
| 36 | 36 | "Catalina jura vengarse" | 8 September 2016 | 1.79 |
| 37 | 37 | "Demandan a La Diabla" | 9 September 2016 | 1.64 |
| 38 | 38 | "Llega El Titi" | 12 September 2016 | 1.68 |
| 39 | 39 | "Catalina enfrenta su realidad" | 13 September 2016 | N/A |
| 40 | 40 | "La Diabla está obsesionada" | 14 September 2016 | 1.81 |
| 41 | 41 | "Catalina pide ayuda" | 15 September 2016 | 1.74 |
| 42 | 42 | "Desesperada búsqueda" | 16 September 2016 | N/A |
| 43 | 43 | "Pacto malvado" | 19 September 2016 | 1.89 |
| 44 | 44 | "Inocencia perdida" | 20 September 2016 | N/A |
| 45 | 45 | "Plan de fuga" | 21 September 2016 | 1.72 |
| 46 | 46 | "Catalina ya es una prepago" | 22 September 2016 | 1.85 |
| 47 | 47 | "Catalina se cotiza" | 23 September 2016 | 1.83 |
| 48 | 48 | "Catalina se salva en la raya" | 27 September 2016 | 1.95 |
| 49 | 49 | "Duro golpe para Nachito" | 28 September 2016 | 1.85 |
| 50 | 50 | "Daniela alerta a La Diabla" | 29 September 2016 | 1.96 |
| 51 | 51 | "Daniela, dispuesta a todo" | 30 September 2016 | 1.84 |
| 52 | 52 | "Atacan a La Diabla" | 3 October 2016 | 1.99 |
| 53 | 53 | "La Diabla juega con la muerte" | 4 October 2016 | 1.87 |
| 54 | 54 | "Catalina encuentra el botín" | 5 October 2016 | 1.91 |
| 55 | 55 | "El engaño es oficial" | 7 October 2016 | N/A |
| 56 | 56 | "Catalina desespera" | 10 October 2016 | 1.80 |
| 57 | 57 | "La decepción de Albeiro" | 11 October 2016 | 1.86 |
| 58 | 58 | "A prueba de fuego" | 12 October 2016 | 1.79 |
| 59 | 59 | "Encuentro frustrado" | 13 October 2016 | 1.81 |
| 60 | 60 | "Último adiós interrumpido" | 14 October 2016 | 1.69 |
| 61 | 61 | "Muertes por encargo" | 17 October 2016 | 1.75 |
| 62 | 62 | "Valioso secreto" | 18 October 2016 | 1.99 |
| 63 | 63 | "Ejército contra el miedo" | 20 October 2016 | 1.80 |
| 64 | 64 | "Oportunidad de oro" | 21 October 2016 | 1.61 |
| 65 | 65 | "Trato hecho" | 24 October 2016 | N/A |
| 66 | 66 | "La Diabla se quiebra" | 25 October 2016 | 1.78 |
| 67 | 67 | "Atentado" | 26 October 2016 | 1.82 |
| 68 | 68 | "Siniestra solución" | 27 October 2016 | 1.99 |
| 69 | 69 | "Lesbianas" | 28 October 2016 | 1.64 |
| 70 | 70 | "Compras nerviosas" | 31 October 2016 | 1.64 |
| 71 | 71 | "Lista para matar" | 1 November 2016 | 1.87 |
| 72 | 72 | "Emboscada apasionada" | 2 November 2016 | 1.83 |
| 73 | 73 | "Mente criminal" | 3 November 2016 | 1.86 |
| 74 | 74 | "Por fin juntos" | 4 November 2016 | 1.76 |
| 75 | 75 | "Ver para creer" | 7 November 2016 | 1.85 |
| 76 | 76 | "Ser narco, un arte" | 9 November 2016 | 1.90 |
| 77 | 77 | "Misión cementerio" | 10 November 2016 | 1.78 |
| 78 | 78 | "Robo frustrado" | 11 November 2016 | 1.70 |
| 79 | 79 | "Puro coraje" | 14 November 2016 | 1.99 |
| 80 | 80 | "Diabólico" | 16 November 2016 | 1.94 |
| 81 | 81 | "Matón desenfrenado" | 17 November 2016 | 1.73 |
| 82 | 82 | "Amor eterno" | 18 November 2016 | N/A |
| 83 | 83 | "Albeiro concede" | 21 November 2016 | N/A |
| 84 | 84 | "Desenterrar la verdad" | 22 November 2016 | 2.00 |
| 85 | 85 | "Prueba contundente" | 23 November 2016 | 1.77 |
| 86 | 86 | "Prisión y muerte" | 24 November 2016 | 1.16 |
| 87 | 87 | "Objetivo en marcha" | 25 November 2016 | 1.80 |
| 88 | 88 | "Matones al acecho" | 28 November 2016 | N/A |
| 89 | 89 | "La vida en un hilo" | 28 November 2016 | N/A |
| 90 | 90 | "Terrible sorpresa" | 28 November 2016 | N/A |

=== Season 2 (2017) ===
| No. overall | No. in season | Title | Original release date | US viewers (millions) |
|---|---|---|---|---|
| 91 | 1 | "Catalina la sobreviviente" | 25 July 2017 | 1.83 |
| 92 | 2 | "Nace Virginia Fernández" | 26 July 2017 | 1.85 |
| 93 | 3 | "Catalina se une a la TEA" | 27 July 2017 | 1.65 |
| 94 | 4 | "Virginia escribe su destino" | 28 July 2017 | 1.47 |
| 95 | 5 | "Veinte años después" | 31 July 2017 | 1.54 |
| 96 | 6 | "Dulce justicia" | 1 August 2017 | 1.66 |
| 97 | 7 | "El que las hace, las paga" | 2 August 2017 | 1.66 |
| 98 | 8 | "Entre suspicacias y trampas" | 3 August 2017 | 1.59 |
| 99 | 9 | "La nueva misión de Virginia" | 4 August 2017 | 1.31 |
| 100 | 10 | "El momento de la verdad" | 7 August 2017 | 1.80 |
| 101 | 11 | "Negocios entre enemigas" | 8 August 2017 | 1.74 |
| 102 | 12 | "Pasaporte a la libertad" | 9 August 2017 | 1.63 |
| 103 | 13 | "Estrategia amorosa" | 10 August 2017 | 1.79 |
| 104 | 14 | "Una chica mala" | 11 August 2017 | 1.58 |
| 105 | 15 | "La Diabla en control" | 14 August 2017 | 1.59 |
| 106 | 16 | "Amenaza de muerte" | 15 August 2017 | 1.64 |
| 107 | 17 | "Tumba vacía" | 16 August 2017 | 1.70 |
| 108 | 18 | "Sentimientos encontrados" | 17 August 2017 | 1.60 |
| 109 | 19 | "Fuga en marcha" | 18 August 2017 | 1.48 |
| 110 | 20 | "Reencuentro electrizante" | 21 August 2017 | 1.88 |
| 111 | 21 | "Sorpresa para Hilda" | 22 August 2017 | 1.89 |
| 112 | 22 | "La Diabla suelta" | 23 August 2017 | 1.73 |
| 113 | 23 | "Un secreto llega a su fin" | 25 August 2017 | 1.59 |
| 114 | 24 | "Pérdida de memoria" | 28 August 2017 | 1.84 |
| 115 | 25 | "Hilda, fuera de sus cabales" | 29 August 2017 | 1.80 |
| 116 | 26 | "De vuelta a Colombia" | 30 August 2017 | 1.69 |
| 117 | 27 | "Blanco equivocado" | 31 August 2017 | 1.73 |
| 118 | 28 | "Catalina en su terreno" | 1 September 2017 | 1.43 |
| 119 | 29 | "Las Catalinas se conocen" | 4 September 2017 | 1.77 |
| 120 | 30 | "Reencuentros y despedidas" | 6 September 2017 | 2.01 |
| 121 | 31 | "El dolor de El Titi" | 7 September 2017 | 1.80 |
| 122 | 32 | "Recuerdos con Marcial" | 8 September 2017 | 1.54 |
| 123 | 33 | "Hilda, a la defensiva" | 11 September 2017 | 1.74 |
| 124 | 34 | "Las Diablas tocan fondo" | 12 September 2017 | 1.79 |
| 125 | 35 | "Daniela se confiesa" | 13 September 2017 | 1.69 |
| 126 | 36 | "Mariana sin límites" | 14 September 2017 | 1.60 |
| 127 | 37 | "Estrategia de la TEA" | 15 September 2017 | 1.48 |
| 128 | 38 | "Las fichas de La Diabla" | 18 September 2017 | 1.61 |
| 129 | 39 | "Lección de madre" | 19 September 2017 | 1.67 |
| 130 | 40 | "Traición de socios" | 20 September 2017 | 1.66 |
| 131 | 41 | "Pensamientos fuera de lugar" | 21 September 2017 | 1.63 |
| 132 | 42 | "Cambio de planes" | 22 September 2017 | 1.43 |
| 133 | 43 | "El pasado revive" | 25 September 2017 | 1.64 |
| 134 | 44 | "Se reavivan los sentimientos" | 26 September 2017 | 1.70 |
| 135 | 45 | "Mariana, un ser sin alma" | 27 September 2017 | 1.93 |
| 136 | 46 | "Corazón partido" | 28 September 2017 | 1.81 |
| 137 | 47 | "El Titi, deslumbrado" | 29 September 2017 | 1.76 |
| 138 | 48 | "Virginia se la juega" | 2 October 2017 | 1.78 |
| 139 | 49 | "El dominio de Virginia" | 3 October 2017 | 1.85 |
| 140 | 50 | "El Titi a punto de caer" | 4 October 2017 | 1.74 |
| 141 | 51 | "Virginia bajo sospecha" | 5 October 2017 | 1.74 |
| 142 | 52 | "¿Una trampa de Martín?" | 6 October 2017 | N/A |
| 143 | 53 | "Propósitos perversos" | 9 October 2017 | 1.70 |
| 144 | 54 | "Virginia en graves problemas" | 11 October 2017 | 1.79 |
| 145 | 55 | "Plan de seducción" | 12 October 2017 | 1.76 |
| 146 | 56 | "Intento de fuga" | 13 October 2017 | N/A |
| 147 | 57 | "La maldad a flor de piel" | 16 October 2017 | 1.80 |
| 148 | 58 | "Misión imposible" | 17 October 2017 | N/A |
| 149 | 59 | "La astucia de Mariana" | 18 October 2017 | 1.67 |
| 150 | 60 | "La otra cara de Hilda" | 19 October 2017 | 1.77 |
| 151 | 61 | "Espías al acecho" | 20 October 2017 | 1.56 |
| 152 | 62 | "Una fría despedida" | 23 October 2017 | N/A |
| 153 | 63 | "El Titi las paga" | 24 October 2017 | N/A |
| 154 | 64 | "Madre angustiada" | 25 October 2017 | N/A |
| 155 | 65 | "Rescate sangriento" | 27 October 2017 | 1.60 |
| 156 | 66 | "Furia desatada" | 30 October 2017 | 1.87 |
| 157 | 67 | "Terreno desconocido" | 31 October 2017 | N/A |
| 158 | 68 | "La Diabla arma su ejército" | 1 November 2017 | 1.70 |
| 159 | 69 | "El juego de La Diabla" | 2 November 2017 | 2.03 |
| 160 | 70 | "Adolescente perdida" | 3 November 2017 | 1.62 |
| 161 | 71 | "Una rebelde e ingenua" | 6 November 2017 | 2.11 |
| 162 | 72 | "Marina entra en trance" | 7 November 2017 | 1.83 |
| 163 | 73 | "La realidad de Mariana" | 8 November 2017 | 1.73 |
| 164 | 74 | "La Diabla en la gloria" | 9 November 2017 | 1.67 |
| 165 | 75 | "La Diabla utiliza la magia negra" | 10 November 2017 | 1.59 |
| 166 | 76 | "El rescate de Albeiro e Hilda" | 13 November 2017 | 1.71 |
| 167 | 77 | "Maquinación" | 14 November 2017 | 1.92 |
| 168 | 78 | "El Titi prepara un agasajo" | 15 November 2017 | 1.63 |
| 169 | 79 | "Conjuros y rituales" | 16 November 2017 | 1.51 |
| 170 | 80 | "El sufrimiento y la furia" | 17 November 2017 | 1.67 |
| 171 | 81 | "El coraje de una madre" | 20 November 2017 | 1.65 |
| 172 | 82 | "La otra cara de Chalo" | 21 November 2017 | 1.64 |
| 173 | 83 | "Maleficio" | 22 November 2017 | 1.70 |
| 174 | 84 | "Morbosa obsesión" | 23 November 2017 | 1.03 |
| 175 | 85 | "Bajo el efecto del hechizo" | 24 November 2017 | 1.44 |
| 176 | 86 | "Malas influencias" | 27 November 2017 | 1.78 |
| 177 | 87 | "La corona tiene precio" | 28 November 2017 | 2.03 |

=== Season 3 (2018) ===
| No. overall | No. in season | Title | Original release date | US viewers (millions) |
|---|---|---|---|---|
| 178 | 1 | "Catalina gana el reinado" | 12 June 2018 | 1.68 |
| 179 | 2 | "La Diabla pierde a Daniela" | 13 June 2018 | 1.46 |
| 180 | 3 | "Asignan refuerzos a Catalina" | 14 June 2018 | 1.47 |
| 181 | 4 | "La Diabla embalsama a Daniela" | 15 June 2018 | 1.22 |
| 182 | 5 | "La pesadilla de Catalina" | 18 June 2018 | 1.49 |
| 183 | 6 | "Albeiro quiere casarse" | 19 June 2018 | 1.43 |
| 184 | 7 | "Se rompe el hechizo de Albeiro" | 20 June 2018 | 1.42 |
| 185 | 8 | "Le disparan a Albeiro" | 21 June 2018 | 1.53 |
| 186 | 9 | "Catalina va por La Diabla" | 22 June 2018 | 1.15 |
| 187 | 10 | "Entre la espada y la pared" | 25 June 2018 | 1.62 |
| 188 | 11 | "El Titi quiere casarse" | 26 June 2018 | 1.47 |
| 189 | 12 | "La Diabla se sale con la suya" | 27 June 2018 | 1.51 |
| 190 | 13 | "El Titi complica a Catalina" | 28 June 2018 | 1.42 |
| 191 | 14 | "La Diabla mata a Chalo" | 29 June 2018 | 1.30 |
| 192 | 15 | "La Diabla tiene cómo negociar" | 2 July 2018 | 1.40 |
| 193 | 16 | "Catalina y su misión peligrosa" | 3 July 2018 | 1.33 |
| 194 | 17 | "Catalina se juega la vida" | 4 July 2018 | 0.99 |
| 195 | 18 | "La Diabla contacta a El Titi" | 5 July 2018 | 1.43 |
| 196 | 19 | "Catalina le da el sí a El Titi" | 6 July 2018 | 1.28 |
| 197 | 20 | "Catalina salva a Mariana" | 9 July 2018 | 1.47 |
| 198 | 21 | "Catalina amenaza a El Titi" | 10 July 2018 | 1.51 |
| 199 | 22 | "Catalina caza a La Diabla" | 11 July 2018 | 1.48 |
| 200 | 23 | "Catalina captura a La Diabla" | 12 July 2018 | 1.60 |
| 201 | 24 | "La Diabla nunca se rinde" | 13 July 2018 | 1.31 |
| 202 | 25 | "Un ultimátum para La Diabla" | 16 July 2018 | 1.38 |
| 203 | 26 | "Martín planea cocinar a Lucía" | 17 July 2018 | 1.36 |
| 204 | 27 | "Catalina vuelve con Santiago" | 18 July 2018 | 1.47 |
| 205 | 28 | "Albeiro piensa en Catalina" | 19 July 2018 | 1.42 |
| 206 | 29 | "Albeiro deja atrás a Catalina" | 20 July 2018 | 1.23 |
| 207 | 30 | "Nachi no se alejará de su hija" | 23 July 2018 | 1.53 |
| 208 | 31 | "Nacho no es padre" | 24 July 2018 | 1.42 |
| 209 | 32 | "Hernán Darío encara a Mariana" | 25 July 2018 | 1.53 |
| 210 | 33 | "Catalina sufre por Ximena" | 26 July 2018 | 1.62 |
| 211 | 34 | "Titi pasa el dato a Catalina" | 27 July 2018 | 1.40 |
| 212 | 35 | "Mariana se quita la máscara" | 30 July 2018 | 1.48 |
| 213 | 36 | "El Titi en la mira de Catalina" | 31 July 2018 | 1.61 |
| 214 | 37 | "Mariana renuncia a su hija" | 1 August 2018 | 1.60 |
| 215 | 38 | "El Titi se entera que es padre" | 2 August 2018 | 1.55 |
| 216 | 39 | "Mariana tiene aliados" | 3 August 2018 | 1.38 |
| 217 | 40 | "Emboscada contra La Diabla" | 6 August 2018 | 1.43 |
| 218 | 41 | "La Diabla camino a su fin" | 7 August 2018 | 1.52 |
| 219 | 42 | "La Diabla sobrevive el ataque" | 8 August 2018 | 1.48 |
| 220 | 43 | "Explota la casa de Nachito" | 9 August 2018 | 1.49 |
| 221 | 44 | "Nachi al borde de la muerte" | 10 August 2018 | 1.39 |
| 222 | 45 | "Catalina acusa a Mariana" | 13 August 2018 | 1.37 |
| 223 | 46 | "La maldición rodea a Catalina" | 14 August 2018 | 1.38 |
| 224 | 47 | "Albeiro en brazos de Catalina" | 15 August 2018 | 1.30 |
| 225 | 48 | "Albeiro se sincera con Hilda" | 16 August 2018 | 1.43 |
| 226 | 49 | "Titi no se apartará de su hija" | 17 August 2018 | 1.17 |
| 227 | 50 | "Catalina recibe un ascenso" | 20 August 2018 | 1.40 |
| 228 | 51 | "Mariana traiciona a su madre" | 21 August 2018 | 1.47 |
| 229 | 52 | "Catalina se apega al deber" | 22 August 2018 | 1.39 |
| 230 | 53 | "La Diabla destapa su rostro" | 23 August 2018 | 1.47 |
| 231 | 54 | "Hernán Darío despierta" | 24 August 2018 | 1.20 |
| 232 | 55 | "Donante de cara para Yésica" | 27 August 2018 | 1.45 |
| 233 | 56 | "Mariana aspira ser como Yésica" | 28 August 2018 | 1.40 |
| 234 | 57 | "Mariana es la narco más joven" | 29 August 2018 | 1.45 |
| 235 | 58 | "Yésica elige su nuevo rostro" | 30 August 2018 | 1.31 |
| 236 | 59 | "Catalina y Nachito se casan" | 3 September 2018 | 1.45 |
| 237 | 60 | "Catalina está embarazada" | 4 September 2018 | 1.42 |
| 238 | 61 | "Santiago muerde el anzuelo" | 5 September 2018 | 1.48 |
| 239 | 62 | "Catalina desconfía de Santiago" | 6 September 2018 | 1.47 |
| 240 | 63 | "La Diabla, escolta de Catalina" | 10 September 2018 | 1.69 |

=== Season 4 (2026) ===
| No. overall | No. in season | Title | Original release date |
|---|---|---|---|
| 241 | 1 | "Bajo fuego" | 16 November 2026 |
| 242 | 2 | "Rastro fallido" | 17 November 2026 |
| 243 | 3 | "Trampa y traición" | 18 November 2026 |
| 244 | 4 | "El precio de la paz" | 19 November 2026 |
| 245 | 5 | "Sacrificio" | 20 November 2026 |

=== Specials ===
| Title | Original release date | US viewers (millions) |
|---|---|---|
| "Recapitulación" | 25 July 2017 | 1.55 |
| "Los mejores 20 momentos" | 7 September 2017 | 1.16 |
