= La viuda negra (TV series) =

Spanish-language crime drama television series

- Season 1 poster
- Genre: Telenovela
- Created by: Yesmer Uribe; Gustavo Bolívar
- Based on: La Patrona de Pablo Escobar: Vida y muerte de Griselda Blanco by José Guarnizo
- Written by: Juan José Gaviria
- Story by: José Guarnizo
- Directed by: Carlos Cock; William González Zafra; Alejandro Lozano; Alejandro García
- Creative director: Gabriela Monroy
- Starring: See list
- Theme music composer: Francis Amat
- Opening theme: "Cuidado" by Samo
- Countries of origin: Mexico; United States; Colombia
- No. of seasons: 2
- No. of episodes: 144

Production
- Executive producer: Hugo León Ferrer
- Producers: Madeleine Contreras; Dereck Bond
- Production locations: Bogotá, Colombia; Medellín, Colombia; Mexico City, Mexico; New York City, NY, U.S.; Miami, Florida, U.S.
- Editor: Alba Merchan Hamann
- Production companies: RTI Producciones; Televisa

Original release
- Network: UniMás; Caracol Televisión
- Release: February 23, 2014 – May 22, 2016

La viuda negra (The Black Widow) is a 2014 Spanish-language telenovela produced by RTI Producciones and Televisa for United States–based television network Univisión and for Colombia-based television network Caracol Television. It is an adaptation of the book La patrona de Pablo Escobar of José Guarnizo based on history from Griselda Blanco.

== Series overview ==
Season	Episodes	Originally released	
Season	Episodes	First released	Last released
1	81	February 23, 2014	June 8, 2014
2	58	February 28, 2016	May 22, 2016

=== Season 1 (2014) ===
The story of Griselda Blanco, a woman who as a teenager was raped by her stepfather. Griselda decides to leave home because her mother did not believe her stepfather abused her. Griselda joins a gang of criminals in order to survive alone in the world. Griselda falls for "Cejas" the first man who betrays her and thus was born "La viuda negra", a woman who murdered her three husbands for having betrayed her. Her ruthlessness and ability to sell large amounts of cocaine earned her the reputation of The Queen of Cocaine.

=== Season 2 (2016) ===
Griselda has a second chance to live, but to save her son, who is sentenced to die in the electric chair, Griselda agrees to work with the American government and help end a dangerous drug cártel, whose leader is José Joaquín Guerra, alias "El Diablo".

Griselda feels lost and desolate in love, until she meets her guardian angel, Ángel Escudero. This time, the widow will have to choose between returning to wear the crown as "Queen of Cocaine" or secure the future of her new family.

== Cast ==
=== Main ===
- Ana Serradilla as Griselda Blanco
- Julián Román as Richi
- Ramiro Meneses as Sugar
- Juan Pablo Gamboa as Norm Jones
- Eileen Moreno as Young Griselda
- Lucho Velasco as Robayo
- Margarita Reyes as Celia
- Alex Gil as Killer
- Francisco Bolívar as Agente García
- Jenni Osorio as Juliana
- Emilia Ceballos as Katty
- Isabel Cristina Estrada as Abogada
- Katherine Porto as Susana
- Raúl Méndez as Joaquí Guerra "El Diablo"
- Luis Giraldo as Dylan
- Héctor de Malba as Alejandro Buendía
- Luis Roberto Guzmán as Ángel Escudero
- Daniel Lugo as Carlos Sarmiento
- César Mora as Pelón
- Antonio Jiménez as Tyler
- Martín Karpan as Brian Ferguson
- María Fernanda Yepes as Venus
- Héctor García as Yépez
- Alejandro López as Rincón
- Luis Carlos Fuquen as "Lokiño"
- Claudio Cataño as Robert Jones
- Mauricio Bastidas as Capó
- Eduardo Victoria as Topo
- Piero Melotti as El Zarco
- Alfredo Anhert as Vicente
- Angeline Moncayo as Daga
- Sandra Beltrán as Cecilia

=== Recurring ===
- Fernando Gaviria as General Guzmán
- Tiaré Scanda as Ana Blanco
- Viviana Serna as Karla Otálvaro
- Julián Farietta as Michael Corleone Blanco
- Yessy García as Silvio
- Camilo Wilson as Cejas
- Rodolfo Silva as Coronel Ronderos
- Ana Soler as Señora Restrepo
- María José Vargas as Child Griselda
- Norma Nivia as La Alemana
- Pablo Valentín as Ceferino
- Carlos Felipe Sánchez as Young Richi
- Luis Eduardo Motoa as Presidente de Colombia
- Ilja Rosendahl as State Attorney
- Vanessa Acosta Paula Gómez
- Camila Kisara as Cinthya
- Claudio Cataño as Robert Jones
- Luis Fernando Montoya as Enzo Vittoria
- Mauricio Mejía as Pablo Escobar
- Lucas Velázquez as Eduardo Farfán
- Roberto Manrique as Doménico Vittoria

== Broadcast ==
The series premiered on February 23, 2014, in United States on UniMás, on September 1, 2014, in Colombia on Caracol Televisión.
