= Operación Pacífico =

American television series

- Genre: Drama
- Written by: Alberto González; Aura María Niño; Juan Carlos Aparicio; Arleth Castillo; Gilma Peña
- Directed by: Diego Mejía; Mónica Botero
- Starring: Majida Issa; Mark Tacher; Julio Bracho; Christian Tappan; Luciano D'Alessandro; Klemen Novak; Ernesto Benjumea; Shany Nadan; Johanna Fadul; Emmanuel Orenday; Cynthia Alesco; Ronald Torres; Juan Carlos Cruz; Mauricio Sánchez; Jerónimo Barón; José Castaño; Jorge Enrique Abello; Antonio de la Vega; Jorge Zárate
- Theme music composer: Fede Castillo; Leha Martínez
- Opening theme: "Fuego" by Patricia Manterola
- Composer: Tulio Cremisini
- Country of origin: United States
- Original language: Spanish
- No. of seasons: 1
- No. of episodes: 44

Production
- Executive producers: David Posada; Ángela Suárez; Guillermo Restrepo; Silvia Durán
- Production companies: Telemundo Global Studios; Fox Telecolombia

Original release
- Network: Telemundo
- Release: 10 February – 17 April 2020

Operación Pacífico is an American drama television series produced by Telemundo Global Studios and Fox Telecolombia for Telemundo. The series premiered on 10 February 2020 and ended on 17 April 2020.

== Synopsis ==
The series revolves around Amalia Ortega, a leading and brilliant federal agent of the secret investigation unit of the National Police who has the mission and personal objective of capturing El Guapo, one of the last drug traffickers on the northern border of Mexico.

== Cast ==
An extensive cast list was published in November 2019 by the American magazines People en Español and Vidamoderna.com.

=== Main ===
- Majida Issa as Amalia Ortega
- Mark Tacher as Gabriel Pedraza
- Julio Bracho as Rodolfo Espinosa Roldán "El Guapo"
- Christian Tappan as Major Ernesto Vargas
- Luciano D'Alessandro as Jorge Camacho
- Klemen Novak as Agent Bradley Jones
- Ernesto Benjumea as General Álvaro López
- Shany Nadan as Teniente Paula Gaitán
- Johanna Fadul as Mariana Ortega
- Emmanuel Orenday as Guerrero
- Cynthia Alesco as Lupe
- Ronald Torres
- Juan Carlos Cruz
- Mauricio Sánchez
- Jerónimo Barón as Matías Camacho
- José Castaño as Lorenzo Camacho
- Jorge Enrique Abello as Señor M
- Antonio de la Vega as Raúl Aparicio
- Jorge Zárate as El Doctor

=== Recurring ===
- Óscar Borda
- Luigi Aicardi
- Katherine Velez
- Diana Wiswell
- Lina Cardona

== Production ==
The series was confirmed in May 2019 during the Telemundo upfront for the 2019–2020 television season, with Majida Issa as the main protagonist, and Mark Tacher as the second protagonist. Although the series had begun filming in May 2019, Telemundo officially announced the start of production on 21 October 2019. In addition, Venezuelan actor Luciano D'Alessandro was confirmed as the third protagonist, along with Johanna Fadul.

== Episodes ==
No.	Title	Original release date	US viewers (millions)
1	"El sello de la serpiente"	10 February 2020	0.91
2	"El Doctor y su obra quirúrgica"	11 February 2020	0.98
3	"En peligro"	12 February 2020	1.00
4	"Obedecer a la capitana"	13 February 2020	0.99
5	"Amalia se juega la vida"	14 February 2020	0.78
6	"La única opción"	17 February 2020	0.90
7	"La mesera y el traficante"	18 February 2020	0.91
8	"Trabajar para el enemigo"	19 February 2020	0.88
9	"La llamada inesperada"	20 February 2020	0.91
10	"Un paso adelante"	21 February 2020	0.86
11	"La sorpresa"	24 February 2020	0.97
12	"El plan de Pedraza"	25 February 2020	0.99
13	"Celos, malditos celos"	26 February 2020	0.92
14	"Cavar tu propia tumba"	27 February 2020	1.00
15	"Sin arrepentimiento"	28 February 2020	1.00
16	"De amigo a enemigo"	2 March 2020	0.97
17	"Una sola palabra"	4 March 2020	0.88
18	"Encuentro inesperado"	5 March 2020	0.81
19	"Detrás del Guapo"	6 March 2020	0.93
20	"Las dos mujeres"	9 March 2020	0.93
21	"Roba corazones"	10 March 2020	0.89
22	"El hombre de la máscara"	11 March 2020	0.94
23	"Las verdades a la cara"	12 March 2020	0.89
24	"Amor en peligro"	13 March 2020	0.89
25	"Acorralados en casa"	17 March 2020	1.03
26	"Más cerca que nunca"	18 March 2020	1.01
27	"¿Y ahora qué?"	19 March 2020	1.03
28	"El calor de la muerte"	20 March 2020	1.01
29	"Con las manos atadas"	24 March 2020	0.98
30	"Todo por Amalia"	25 March 2020	0.95
31	"La peligrosa negociación"	26 March 2020	1.03
32	"El Guapo señor San Miguel"	27 March 2020	1.02
33	"Todo un Guerrero"	31 March 2020	1.00
34	"En la mira"	1 April 2020	0.83
35	"El disparo certero"	2 April 2020	0.93
36	"Que nadie se mueva"	3 April 2020	0.88
37	"La venganza del Guapo"	7 April 2020	0.87
38	"El secuestro de los niños"	8 April 2020	0.93
39	"Arriesgarlo todo"	9 April 2020	0.85
40	"El saludo de los muertos"	10 April 2020	0.94
41	"Jugar con la vida"	14 April 2020	0.91
42	"El infierno de Mariana"	15 April 2020	0.92
43	"Hay amores que mata"	16 April 2020	0.94
44	"Bajo tierra"	17 April 2020	0.94

== Reception ==
=== Television ratings ===
Viewership and ratings per season of Operación Pacífico
Season	Timeslot (ET)	Episodes	First aired		Last aired		Avg. viewers (millions)
Season	Timeslot (ET)	Episodes	Date	Viewers (millions)	Date	Viewers (millions)	Avg. viewers (millions)
1	Mon–Fri 10:00 pm	44	10 February 2020	0.91	17 April 2020	0.94	0.94

=== Awards and nominations ===
Year	Award	Category	Nominated	Result	Ref
2020	Produ Awards	Best Superseries	Operación Pacífico	Won	
