= Sin senos sí hay paraíso =

Telenovela series

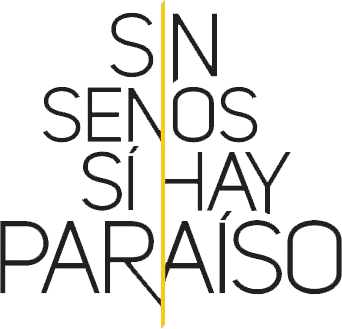
- Genre: Telenovela
- Created by: Gustavo Bolívar
- Based on: Sin tetas sí hay paraíso by Gustavo Bolívar
- Directed by: Diego Mejía Montes
- Creative directors: Rosario Lozano; Jonny Torres
- Starring: Catherine Siachoque; Fabián Ríos; Carolina Gaitán; Juan Pablo Urrego; Majida Issa; Johanna Fadul; César Mora; Juan Pablo Llano; Juan Sebastián Calero; Luigi Aicardi; Carmen Villalobos; Vicky Hernández; Dagoberto Gama; Roberto Manrique; Gregorio Pernía; Francisco Bolívar; Juan Alfonso Baptista; Javier Jattin
- Music by: Robert Taylor; Gustavo Bolívar; Nicolás Tovar
- Opening theme: See below
- Country of origin: United States
- Original language: Spanish
- No. of seasons: 4
- No. of episodes: 245 (list of episodes)

Production
- Executive producer: Consuelo Corrales
- Producer: Nelson Martínez
- Cinematography: Jaime Andrés Duque; Andrés García
- Editor: Gabriel Gonzalez Balli
- Camera setup: Multi-camera
- Running time: 44 minutes
- Production companies: TIS Productions (Note: Credited as Fox Telecolombia for the first three seasons.); Telemundo Studios

Original release
- Network: Telemundo
- Release: 19 July 2016 – present

Related
- Sin senos no hay paraíso; Sin tetas no hay paraíso; El final del paraíso

Sin senos sí hay paraíso, also known as Sin tetas sí hay paraíso in Colombia, is a Spanish-language telenovela that premiered on Telemundo on 19 July 2016. The telenovela is created by Gustavo Bolívar, based on the book Sin tetas sí hay paraíso, and in turn is a sequel to Sin senos no hay paraíso. It is produced by Fox Telecolombia and Telemundo Studios for Telemundo, and distributed by Telemundo Internacional.

The series revolves around a high school student, Catalina Marín (Carolina Gaitán), and her sister Catalina Santana (Carmen Villalobos), two sisters who despite their financial adversities show that it is not necessary to resort to prostitution, drug trafficking and breast surgery in order to live well.

In May 2019, Telemundo announced a spin-off series titled El final del paraíso, that aired from 13 August 2019 to 9 December 2019.

On 25 January 2023, Telemundo renewed the series for a fourth season that premiered on 16 November 2026.

== Seasons ==
Series	Episodes	Originally released	
Series	Episodes	First released	Last released
1	90	19 July 2016	28 November 2016
2	87	25 July 2017	28 November 2017
3	63	12 June 2018	10 September 2018
4	TBA	16 November 2026	TBA

=== Season 1 (2016) ===
The series begins when Doña Hilda Santana (Catherine Siachoque), who is pregnant, receives the news of the death of her daughter Catalina "La Grande" (Carmen Villalobos), sending her into premature labor with her second daughter, Catalina "La Pequeña" (Carolina Gaitán). When Catalina (Carolina Gaitán) is born, her father Albeiro Marín (Fabián Ríos) and mother Hilda Santana fear she will share her late older sister's fate, as most of the young women in their neighborhood have historically become involved with prostitution and organized crime. In order to protect their daughter, Albeiro and Hilda paint a yellow boundary line outside of their home, forbidding Catalina from crossing it until she turns 18. Catalina then falls in love with a boy named Hernán Darío (Juan Pablo Urrego). After witnessing an attack upon Hernán Darío by Yésica Beltrán's (Majida Issa) bodyguards, Catalina crosses the yellow line to defend him. Hilda and Albeiro intervene to defend their daughter and are apprehended by the bodyguards. Yésica, resentful of Hilda, Albeiro, and Catalina, then orders her men to plant jewelry in Hilda's house in order to incriminate them for a crime they didn't commit. The police, by Yésica's orders, arrest Hernán Darío, Catalina, Doña Hilda, and Albeiro, incarcerating them in different prisons. Catalina is sent to an institution for juvenile girls, where she is beaten and abused by the fellow inmates and guards and nearly drowned under Yésica Beltrán's (Majida Issa) orders. Hernán Darío is beaten and humiliated as well until Yésica and her daughter Daniela (Johanna Fadul) force him to work for them, threatening to hurt his mother, his in-laws and Catalina. Albeiro, along with fellow inmate David, plot to break out of prison in order to escape. Journalist Daniel Cerón helps Catalina and her parents escape, but Hernán Darío, convinced that Catalina is still in prison and in danger, agrees to work for Yésica's daughter Daniela. Daniela, deeply infatuated with Hernán Darío and viciously jealous of his relationship with Catalina, continually attempts to seduce Hernán Darío while he works for her mother.

=== Season 2 (2017) ===
The second season tells the story and the return of Catalina Santana (Carmen Villalobos), the eldest daughter of Doña Hilda Santana (Catherine Siachoque). Catalina was hiding for 20 years after allegedly being murdered, but actually worked as a DEA agent. During all the years of her supposed disappearance, she made her life next to Santiago Sanín (Roberto Manrique) a doctor with whom she had two children Mariana (Stephania Duque) and Sebastián (Johan Esteban Díaz). During her return Catalina is trapped in a world of feeling and guilt for her family, since her return would cause great tragedies and dislikes, especially in Albeiro (Fabián Ríos) who was previously her boyfriend, and for whom she will not know if she still feels something and her mother; who left her and cheated with Albeiro. Catalina meets her other sister Catalina Marín Santana (Carolina Gaitán) and her boyfriend Hernán Dario (Juan Pablo Urrego), with whom she joins to end with La Diabla (Majida Issa) and her daughter Daniela (Johanna Fadul), who will do everything possible to destroy the Santana family.

=== Season 3 (2018) ===
The time has come to choose the most beautiful girl in the region. The catwalk has become a battlefield. The support of the Marín family towards Catalina La Pequeña (Carolina Gaitán) and Yésica Beltrán (Majida Issa) towards her daughter is immense since she is willing to do anything to see her daughter Daniela (Johanna Fadul) crowned as queen of the region. Yésica, who attends the event in disguise of her sister, has come in contact with the juries and seeks to bribe them to tilt their vote in favor of Daniela. But Catalina La Pequeña stands out not only for her beauty but for her intelligence. The result of this contest will define the course of their lives. The relationship of Catalina La Pequeña and Hernán Darío (Juan Pablo Urrego) is threatened by Mariana's obsession. She will give birth to a beautiful girl and continue to claim that she is the daughter of Hernán Darío. Catalina La Pequeña doubt of the paternity of Hernán Darío and will do everything in his power to decipher the identity of the true father. It will not be an easy battle and Mariana will do everything possible to snatch the love of her life to Catalina La Pequeña.

On the other hand, the fearsome curse of the witch Abigail materializes. Catalina La Grande (Carmen Villalobos) and her friends know that their daughters are in danger. Adriana, Vanessa's daughter died, as did Martina, Paola's daughter, and now Catalina La Grande will have to redouble her efforts to take care of Mariana, while Ximena will take care of the steps of her daughter, Valentina. In this battle against evil they will have many allies but there is no lack of enemies.

== Cast ==
Actor	Character	Seasons				
Actor	Character	1	2	3	El final del paraíso	4
Main characters
Catherine Siachoque	Hilda Santana	Main	Main	Main	Main	Main
Fabián Ríos	Albeiro Marín	Main	Main	Main	Main	Main
Carolina Gaitán	Catalina Marín	Main	Main	Main	Main	Main
Juan Pablo Urrego	Hernán Darío	Main	Main	Main	Main	
Johanna Fadul	Daniela Barrera	Main	Main	Guest		
Majida Issa	Yésica Beltrán "La Diabla"; Valeria Montes (s. 3–El final del paraíso) (Note: This was the name Kimberly Reyes used to introduce herself in the series, before playing La Diabla.)	Main	Main	Main		Main
Kimberly Reyes	Yésica Beltrán "La Diabla"; Valeria Montes (s. 3–El final del paraíso)			Guest	Main	
César Mora	Marcial Barrera	Main	Main	Guest		
Juan Pablo Llano	Daniel Cerón	Main	Guest	Guest	Main	
Juan Sebastián Calero	Octavio Rangel	Main	Guest			
Luigi Aicardi	Aníbal Manrique	Main	Main			
Vicky Hernández	Aurora Banegas	Main	Recurring	Guest		
Dagoberto Gama	Gato Gordo	Main	Main			
Gregorio Pernía	Aurelio Jaramillo "El Titi"	Recurring	Main	Main	Main	Main
Francisco Bolívar	José Luis Vargas "Jota"	Recurring	Main	Main	Main	
Carmen Villalobos	Catalina Santana	Guest	Main	Main	Main	Main
Roberto Manrique	Santiago Sanín		Main	Main	Main	
Juan Alfonso Baptista	Martín Cruz		Main	Main		
Javier Jattin	Tony Campana			Main		
Juan Pablo Gamboa	Mano Negra			Recurring	Main	
Mauricio Cujar	Sombra				Main	
Stephania Duque	Mariana Sanín		Recurring	Recurring	Main	
Elianis Garrido	Dayana Muriel		Recurring	Recurring	Main	
Estefanía Gómez	Vanessa Salazar	Recurring	Recurring	Recurring	Main	Main
Linda Baldrich	Natalia				Main	
Manuel Gómez	Esteban Calvo	Recurring	Recurring	Recurring	Main	
Alejandra Pinzón	Paola Pizarro	Guest	Recurring	Recurring	Main	
Martín Karpan	Salvatore Miranda				Main	
Mauricio Mauad	Moncho				Main	
Leonardo Acosta	Alfonso Berrio				Main	
Alejandro Martínez	Roberto Conde				Main	
Recurring characters
Jennifer Arenas	Valentina Fonseca	Recurring	Recurring	Recurring	Recurring	
Diana Isabel Acevedo	Adriana Salazar	Recurring	Guest			
Joselyn Gallardo	Martina Pizarro	Recurring	Recurring			
Carolina Sepúlveda	Ximena Fonseca	Recurring	Recurring	Recurring		
Marilyn Patiño	Lucía Barrios	Recurring	Recurring	Recurring		
Alejandra Ávila	Celia Morán	Recurring	Recurring			
Óscar Salazar	Capitán Pérez	Recurring	Recurring			
Jonathan Cabrera	Carlos Mario	Recurring	Recurring			
Sain Castro	David Herrera	Recurring	Recurring			
Luces Velásquez	Imelda Beltrán	Recurring	Guest			
José Omar Murillo	Pelambre	Recurring	Guest			
Luisa Fernanda Giraldo	Paula Bayona	Recurring		Guest		
Jairo Ordoñez	Mugroso	Recurring				
Julián Bustamante	Martín Herrera	Recurring				
Félix Mercado	Franklin	Recurring				
Julián Beltrán	Pipe	Recurring				
Luis Fernando Montoya	Medicina	Recurring				
Miriam Lanzoni	Belén	Recurring				
Laura García	López		Recurring			
Esmeralda Pinzón	Sandra		Recurring			
Michelle Manterola	Flavia		Recurring			
Johan Esteban Díaz	Child Sesbatián Sanín (s. 2–3); Young Sebastián Sanín (El final del paraíso)		Recurring	Recurring		
Carlos Báez Carvajal	Child Sesbatián Sanín (s. 2–3); Young Sebastián Sanín (El final del paraíso)				Recurring	
Eileen Roca	Zoraya		Recurring	Recurring	Recurring	
Sebastián Moya	Mateo Sanín Fuentes		Recurring	Recurring	Recurring	
Gloria Pinilla	Mirta Muriel		Recurring	Recurring	Recurring	
Margarita Torres	Lizeth Muriel		Recurring	Recurring	Recurring	
Álvaro Benet	Miguel Díaz		Recurring	Recurring		
Luis Fernando Bohórquez	Coronel Granados		Recurring	Recurring		
Daniel Serna	Cabra		Recurring	Recurring		
Abril Schreiber	Claudia Romero		Guest			
Julián Farietta	Gatillo		Guest			
Gisella Aboumrad	Mayra Contreras		Guest			
Juan Diego Sánchez	Bayron Santana		Guest			
Juan Ángel Esparza	Carmelo Villa		Recurring	Recurring	Recurring	
Patricia Maldonado	Abigail		Recurring	Recurring		
Mauricio Mejía	Carlos Jaramillo			Recurring	Recurring	
Alejandra Monsalve	Sandra			Recurring	Recurring	
Ricardo Leguízamo	Álvaro Mendieta			Recurring	Recurring	
Juan David Galindo	Rocco Candela			Recurring	Recurring	
Andrea Pita	Laura			Recurring		
Michelle Rouillard	Ana Paula			Guest		
Marianela González	Emilia Vallejo				Recurring	

== Ratings ==
Viewership and ratings per season of Sin senos sí hay paraíso
Season	Episodes	First aired		Last aired		Avg. viewers (millions)	18–49 rank
Season	Episodes	Date	Viewers (millions)	Date	Viewers (millions)	Avg. viewers (millions)	18–49 rank
1	90	19 July 2016	2.47	28 November 2016	4.05	TBD	TBD
2	87	25 July 2017	1.83	28 November 2017	2.03	TBD	TBD
3	63	12 June 2018	1.68	10 September 2018	1.69	1.43	TBD

== Production ==
The series is based on the book "Sin tetas sí hay paraíso" written by Gustavo Bolívar, who previously wrote "Sin tetas no hay paraíso". The series is known in Colombia as "Sin tetas si hay paraíso".

On 9 May 2019, Telemundo announced a spin-off series titled El final del paraíso that premiered on 13 August 2019, and ended on 9 December 2019. The spin-off marks the beginning of a new era of the series.

On 25 January 2023, Telemundo announced at their 2023 lineup presentation that the series had been renewed for a fourth season. After years of delays, filming for the season began on 13 January 2026. The season premiered on 16 November 2026.

=== Casting ===
The character of Yésica Beltrán, La Diabla, was originally interpreted by María Fernanda Yepes in Sin senos no hay paraíso, but she did not return for the sequel due to scheduling conflicts and personal reasons. Due to this, Majida Issa was cast to take over the role.
Carmen Villalobos was confirmed to reprise her role from the first installment of the series through a "special appearance" in flashback sequences. For the final episode of the first season of "Sin senos sí hay paraíso", the actress appeared again, bringing Catalina Santana back to life, and setting up the stage to continue as a main protagonist in the second season of the renewed series. Carolina Gaitán and Juan Pablo Urrego, who play Catalina "la pequeña" and Hernán Darío, had previously worked together on other projects.
This continuation to Sin senos no hay paraíso features several actors from the first series reprising their role, such as Francisco Bolívar, Alejandra Pinzón, Carolina Sepúlveda, Gregorio Pernía, Fabián Ríos, Catherine Siachoque and César Mora.

== Music ==
Sin senos sí hay paraíso

Soundtrack album by Various artists
- Released: August 6, 2016
- Recorded: 2015–2016
- Label: Four Notes

Singles from Sin senos sí hay paraíso
- 1. "Sin Blin Blin No Hay Paraíso" Released: October 4, 2017

The first soundtrack of the series, titled Sin senos sí hay paraíso, was released on August 6, 2016.

Track listing

No.	Title	Length
1.	"La Raya" (Nicolás Tovar & Robert Taylor)	3:19
2.	"Vendetta" (Nicolás Tovar & Robert Taylor)	3:12
3.	"Chica Mala" (Dennis Fernando & Robert Taylor)	3:26
4.	"Me Dicen Diabla" (Fanny Lu)	4:05
5.	"Tu Amor Es Mi Piel" (La India)	4:12
6.	"Dos Soles" (Robert Taylor & Nicolás Tovar)	3:14
7.	"Sin Blin Blin No Hay Paraíso" (Nicolás Tovar & Robert Taylor)	3:07
8.	"El Gato Gordo" (Nicolás Tovar)	3:38
9.	"Ganó la Esperanza" (Pipe Bueno)	3:20
10.	"Muchachita Consentida" (Nicolás Tovar)	3:07
Total length:		34:00

Other songs not included in the album
No.	Title	Length
1.	"Estar Contigo" (Dennis Fernando, Nicolás Tovar & Robert Taylor)	3:15
2.	"Nunca Me Fui" (Dennis Fernando & Alejandra)	3:44

== Awards and nominations ==
Year	Award	Category	Nominated	Result
2017	Miami Life Awards	Best Female Lead in a Telenovela	Carolina Gaitán	Won
2017	Miami Life Awards	Best Male Lead in a Telenovela	Fabián Ríos	Won
2017	Miami Life Awards	Best Supporting Actress	Johanna Fadul	Nominated
2017	Miami Life Awards	Best Supporting Actor	Juan Pablo Llano	Won
2017	Miami Life Awards	Best telenovela	Sin senos sí hay paraíso	Nominated
2017	Your World Awards	Favorite Series	Sin senos sí hay paraíso	Nominated
2017	Your World Awards	Favorite Lead Actor	Fabián Ríos	Nominated
2017	Your World Awards	Favorite Lead Actress	Carolina Gaitán	Nominated
2017	Your World Awards	Favorite Lead Actress	Catherine Siachoque	Nominated
2017	Your World Awards	The Best Bad Girl	Majida Issa	Won
2017	Your World Awards	Favorite Actor	Juan Pablo Urrego	Won
2017	Your World Awards	Favorite Actress	Catherine Siachoque	Nominated
2017	Your World Awards	The Perfect Couple	Juan Pablo Urrego and Carolina Gaitán	Nominated
2017	Your World Awards	I'm Sexy and I know it	Carmen Villalobos	Won
2017	Your World Awards	I'm Sexy and I know it	Juan Pablo Llano	Nominated
2017	Your World Awards	I'm Sexy and I know it	Majida Issa	Nominated
2017	Your World Awards	The Best Actor with Bad Luck	Carolina Gaitán	Won
2017	26th TVyNovelas Awards Colombia	Favorite series	Sin senos sí hay paraíso	Nominated
2017	26th TVyNovelas Awards Colombia	Best Favorite Female Lead in a Serie	Carolina Gaitán	Nominated
2017	26th TVyNovelas Awards Colombia	Best Favorite Female Villain in a Serie	Johana Fadul	Nominated
2017	26th TVyNovelas Awards Colombia	Best Favorite Female Villain in a Serie	Majida Issa	Nominated
2017	26th TVyNovelas Awards Colombia	Best Favorite Female Supporting Actress in a Serie	Catherine Siachoque	Nominated
2017	26th TVyNovelas Awards Colombia	Best Favorite Male Supporting Actor in a Serie	Fabián Ríos	Nominated
2017	26th TVyNovelas Awards Colombia	Favorite writer of telenovelas or series	Gustavo Bolívar	Nominated
2017	Produ Awards	Writer - Series, Superseries or Telenovela of the Year	Gustavo Bolívar	Won
2017	Produ Awards	Telenovela of the Year	Sin senos sí hay paraíso	Nominated
2018	46th International Emmy Awards	Best Non-English Language U.S. Primetime Program	Sin senos sí hay paraíso	Nominated
