= Javier Jattin =

Colombian actor and model (born 1983)

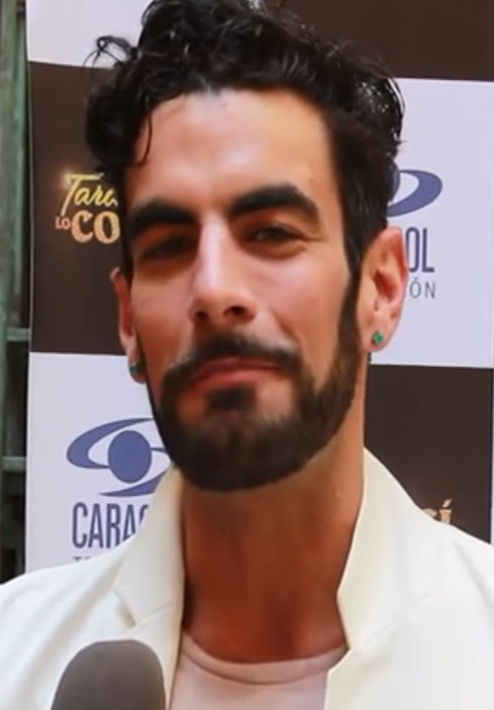
- Born: April 24, 1983 (age 43); Barranquilla, Colombia
- Occupations: Actor, model
- Years active: 2007–present

Javier Jattin (April 24, 1983, Barranquilla, Colombia), is a Colombian actor and model. He is known for Niños Ricos, Pobres Padres (Generation Y), Primera Dama (The First Lady) and La mujer del Vendaval.

== Filmography ==
Film roles
Year	Title	Roles	Notes	Ref.
2016	La vida inmoral de la pareja ideal	Balthazar	Debut film	

Television roles
Year	Title	Roles	Notes	Ref.
2009	las muñecas de la mafia	Roger		
2009–2010	Niños ricos, pobres padres	Matías Quintana	Recurring role	
2010	Chepe Fortuna	José "Chepe" Fortuna	Main role; 119 episodes	
2011–2012	The First Lady	Mariano Zamora	Main role; 150 episodes	
2012–2013	La mujer del Vendaval	Camilo Preciado	Main role; 122 episodes	
2013	Las trampas del deseo	Darío Alvarado	Main role; 120 episodes	
2014	The Color of Passion	Román	Recurring role; 47 episodes	
2015	Hasta el fin del mundo	Paolo	Recurring role; 38 episodes	
2015–2016	La vecina	Eliseo	Main cast; 106 episodes	
2017–2018	Tarde lo conocí	Héctor Méndez	Main role; 105 episodes	
2018	Sin senos sí hay paraíso	Tony Campana	Main role (season 3); 46 episodes	
2019	Decisiones: Unos ganan, otros pierden	Andrés Arango	Episode: "Videos íntimos"	
2020	The House of Flowers	Young Salomón Cohen	4 episodes	
2020-2021	Imperio de mentiras	Fabricio Serrano	Main cast	
2022	Enfermeras	Juan Pablo Valderrama		
