= Flor Salvaje =

American telenovela

- Genre: Telenovela
- Created by: Perla Farías
- Based on: La novia oscura by Laura Restrepo
- Written by: Rossana Negrín; José Vicente Spataro; Juan Marcos Blanco; Basilio Álvarez
- Story by: Laura Restrepo
- Directed by: Mario Mitrotti; Agustín Restrepo
- Creative director: Gabriela Monroy
- Starring: Mónica Spear
- Music by: Marco Flores
- Opening theme: "Oyeme" by Marco Flores
- Country of origin: United States
- Original language: Spanish
- No. of episodes: 150

Production
- Executive producer: Hugo León Ferrer
- Producers: Jorge Sastoque Roa; Andrés Santamaria
- Cinematography: Eduardo Carreño; Alfredo Zamudio
- Editor: Alba Merchan Hamann
- Camera setup: Multi-camera
- Production companies: RTI Producciones; Telemundo Studios

Original release
- Network: Telemundo
- Release: August 2, 2011 – March 2, 2012

Related
- Los herederos del Monte; Corazón valiente

Flor Salvaje is an American telenovela that premiered on Telemundo on August 2, 2011, and concluded on March 2, 2012. The telenovela is produced by Hugo León Ferrer, and created by Perla Farías based on La novia oscura original by Laura Restrepo. The show is deloveped by RTI Producciones and Telemundo Studios, and distributed by Telemundo Internacional. It stars Mónica Spear as the titular character.

== History ==
From August 2, 2011, to March 2, 2012, Telemundo aired Flor Salvaje weeknights at 9pm/8c during the 2011 season, replacing Los Herederos Del Monte. Corazón Valiente replaced this telenovela on March 6, 2012. As with most of its other telenovelas, the network broadcast English subtitles as closed captions on CC3.

Telemundo broadcast reruns of Flor Salvaje weekday mornings at 10:30am/9:30c from August 11, 2014 - January 26, 2015.

== Cast ==
=== Main ===
- Mónica Spear as Amanda Monteverde / Flor Salvaje
- Tony Dalton as Don Rafael Urrieta
- José Luis Reséndez as Pablo Aguilar
- Roberto Manrique as Sacramento Iglesias
- María Elisa Camargo as Catalina Larrazabal de Urrieta
- Gregorio Pernía as Mariano Guerrero
- Geraldine Zivic as La Mina
- Norkys Batista as Zahra
- Angeline Moncayo as Correcaminos / Elena
- Indhira Serrano as Olguita
- Carolina Gaitán as Alicia
- Claudia La Gatta as Clara
- Bibiana Corrales as Rocío Guerrero
- Pedro Palacio as Piruetas
- Alex Gil as Enrique
- Francisco Bolívar as Dudi
- José Luis Paniagua as Don Raimundo Rojas
- Laura Torres as Susana Monteverde
- Susana Rojas as Ana Monteverde
- Sara Quintero as La Beba
- Mauricio Goyeneche as Rufino

=== Recurring ===
- Jonathan Islas as Abel Torres
- Juan Pablo Raba as Emiliano Monteverde
- Gonzalo Vivanco as Francisco Losada

== Awards ==
Year	Award	Category	Nominated	Result
2012	Premios Tu Mundo	The Best Bad Boy	Tony Daltón	Won
