= Juan Sebastián Calero =

Colombian actor

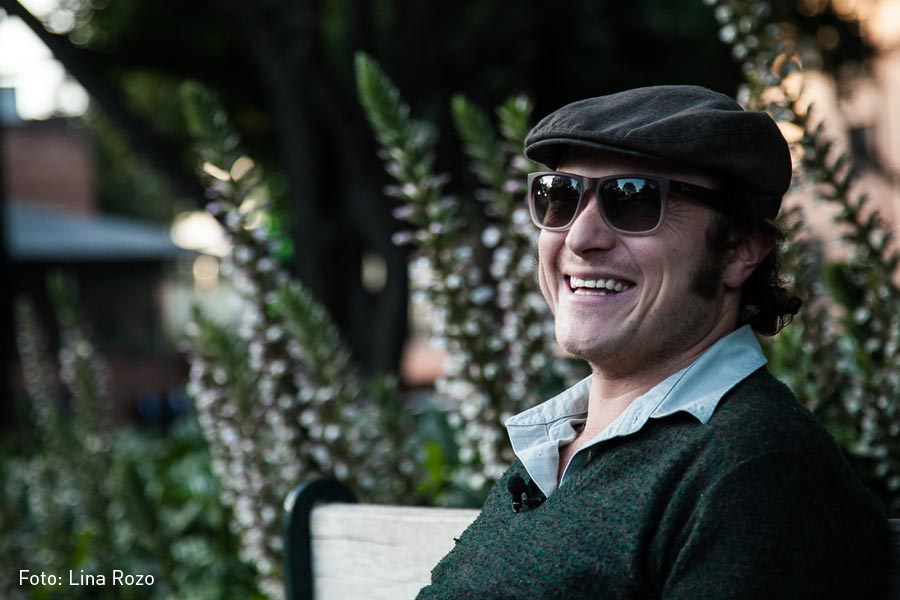
- Born: Juan Sebastián Calero Hernández; January 2, 1982 (age 44); Bogotá, Colombia
- Other name: Chumacero
- Occupation: Actor
- Years active: 1993–present

Juan Sebastián Calero Hernández (born January 2, 1982) is a Colombian actor, recognized for his role as Richardo "El Richard" Castro in the series Gangs, War and Peace and Gangs, War and Peace II. English-speaking viewers will best recognize him as Navegante, the violent top-ranking henchman in Seasons 1–3 of the Netflix original Narcos. He followed in the footsteps of his parents, Gerardo Calero and Vicky Hernández, both of whom are actors.

== Productions ==
=== Television ===
Year	Production	Role
2020	Narcos: Mexico	Navegante
2018	Distrito Salvaje	Raul alias Aníbal
2017	La ley del corazón	Paul Ricaurte
2016	Sin senos sí hay paraíso	Octavio Rangel
2015	Narcos	Navegante
2015	El chivo	Jhonny
2013	Alias el Mexicano	Gonzalo Rodríguez Gacha
2013	La promesa	Hamilton
2012	Escobar, el patrón del mal	Gustavo Gaviria Rivero (young)
2010	Amor sincero	Alexander "Alex" Restrepo Caicedo
2009	Pandillas, Guerra y Paz II	Ricardo "El Richard" Castro
2009	El capo	Fiscal Armando Grisales
2008	Regreso a la guaca	
2005	El pasado no perdona	Fernando
2003	La Jaula	Jorge
2003	El auténtico Rodrigo leal	Omar
1999	Pandillas, Guerra y Paz	Ricardo "El Richard" Castro
1995	Hombres de honor	Francisco rivera JR hijo del capitán rivera
1994	De pies a cabeza	—
1993	Señora Isabel	—

== Awards and nominations ==
=== TVyNovelas Awards ===
Year	Category	Series	Result
2014	Best Leading Actor	Alias el Mexicano	Nominated
2004	Best Leading Actor	Pandillas, Guerra y Paz	Won

=== India Catalina Awards ===
Year	Category	Series	Result
2014	Best Leading Actor in a Series or Miniseries	Alias el Mexicano	Nominated
2010	Best Leading Actor in a Series or Miniseries	Gangs, War and Peace II	Nominated
