= Decisiones: Unos ganan, otros pierden =

2019 American television series by Telemundo

- No. of episodes: 37

Release
- Original network: Telemundo
- Original release: 10 December 2019 – 29 November 2020

Decisiones: Unos ganan, otros pierden (English: Decisions: Some Win and Others Lose), is a new season of the anthology drama television series Decisiones. The season is produced by Telemundo Global Studios, and is recorded in 4K Ultra-high-definition television. Martha Godoy serves as showrunner of the season. It premiered on 10 December 2019 on Telemundo, and concluded on 29 November 2020. The season has Rodrigo Figueroa, Marcela Mejía, José Vicente Scheuren as executive producers. The concept was in charge of Juan Marcos Blanco, Sergio Mendoza and Marcos Santana, with the participation of Héctor Suárez Gomís as an advisor.

== Premise ==
The new season—is more inclined towards thriller, suspense and action—tell stories that are affecting ordinary people today. Inspired by high profile research, cases of human identity, social and political struggles, each episode focuses on a transcendental decision that will change the lives of the main characters in a moving, extraordinary and radical way. At the end of each episode, current statistics related to the central plot will be included, which were prepared by Noticias Telemundo to create awareness and reflection on the issues.

== Notable guest stars ==
Each episode of the series is starring notable Telemundo actors, who have recently entered the channel or have been working for Telemundo for several years. The first episode of the series entitled "El Cazador" is starring Litzy, who has been part of the network for several years. The second episode entitled "Furia en el tráfico" starred Jorge Luis Pila, who since 2016 did not carry out a television project. The third episode entitled "El baúl" stars Laura Flores and Adriano Zendejas. The fourth episode entitled "Videos íntimos" is starring Javier Jattin, who months ago had confirmed to stop making telenovelas. The fifth episode entitled "Sueño en tinieblas" is stars by the Venezuelan actor Luciano D'Alessandro, who recently joined Telemundo.

== Television rating ==
Viewership and ratings per season of Decisiones: Unos ganan, otros pierden
Season	Timeslot (ET)	Episodes	First aired		Last aired		Avg. viewers (millions)	18–49 rank
Season	Timeslot (ET)	Episodes	Date	Viewers (millions)	Date	Viewers (millions)	Avg. viewers (millions)	18–49 rank
1	Mon–Fri 9pm/8c (Note: Mon–Fri 8pm/7c: Schedule change announced on 20 December 2019.)	27	10 December 2019	0.91	17 January 2020	0.68	0.76	TBD

== Episodes ==
No.	Title	Directed by	Written by	Original release date	US viewers (millions)
1	"El Cazador"	Héctor Márquez	Erick Hernández	10 December 2019	0.91
William is a 30-year-old war veteran who, after suffering a gunshot wound to his leg, stopped working. Now resentful and hermit is dedicated to hunting migrants in the US border, but his life changes radically when she discovers a young Mexican woman in a shed, who was casually pregnant. Cast: Christopher Millán as William, Litzy as Rocío, Ricardo Kleinbaum as Duncan, Kendra Santacruz as Grace, Yamil Sesin as Benny, Salim Rubiales as Pedro
2	"Furia en el tráfico"	Sebastián Hiriart	Erick Hernández	11 December 2019	0.79
Carlos Díaz is a high school teacher who is married. But at the same time he maintains a relationship with his student Lorena. While both decide to leave school to be unfaithful, Carlos collides with another car and getting out of his car hits the other driver, which will make his life have a radical change. Cast: Jorge Luis Pila as Carlos Díaz, Alejandra Villafañe as Lorena, Fiona Horsey as Elena, Mónica Gaviria as Lucía López, David Páez as Abelardo López, Daniel Espinosa as Director, Adriana Bustos as Presentadora de TV, Jessica Kehayias as Teresa Vanes
3	"El baúl"	Carlos Bolado	Gerardo Cadena	12 December 2019	0.78
Emilio an engineering student with a promising future ends his relationship with Alicia. Alicia is subsequently killed, and the main suspect in his death is Emilio, but with the help of his mother Helena, who is a renowned businesswoman decides to help him out of guilt. But Emilio dissatisfied, he finds a trunk that will help him discover who murdered his ex-girlfriend. Cast: Adriano Zendejas as Emilio Savater, Laura Flores as Helena Savater, Ana Cristina as Alicia Tovar, Javier Díaz Dueñas as Detective, Roy Verdiguel as Jaime, Alejandro Maldonado as Alicia's mother
4	"Videos íntimos"	Nicolás Reyes	Bibiana Mayorga	13 December 2019	0.86
Andrés is an attractive and wealthy executive of an importer. Coveted by several women, Andrés secretly leads a dangerous and sexually perverted life as a sexual predator who records naive girls generating pornographic material that he later distributes in private chats and adult portals. Emily, a humble young woman who works as Andres's assistant, discovers her crimes and must decide if she can do the right thing. Cast: Javier Jattin as Andrés Arango, Elizabeth Minotta as Emily Ramirez, Ricardo Vélez as Diego Arango, Daniel Toro as Tomás, Hibened Carreño as Dayana, Isabela Amado as Nataly, Laura Cano as Karen, Marcela Bustamante as Andrés' mother
5	"Sueño en tinieblas"	Claudia Pedraza	María José Ferreiro	16 December 2019	0.69
Guillermo, a young commercial pilot, by imprudence has a traffic accident in which a father dies and his 12-year-old son is in critical condition. Guillermo flees from the scene, and from that moment what happened haunts him like a ghost that tortures him slowly. Guillermo listens in the news that the boy, Eduardo, urgently needs blood donors and they are both the same type, so he decides to go to the hospital to help him. That day he meets Mabel, Eduardo's mother, and will be forced to make a difficult decision that will bring serious consequences to his life. Cast: Luciano D'Alessandro as Guillermo Morán, Gabriel Piñeros as Eduardo, María Cecilia Sánchez as Mabel, Manuela Valdés as Nancy, Gustavo Herrera as Agente Muñoz, Eddy Rivera as Esteban Rodríguez
6	"Celos asesinos"	Conrado Martinez	Felipe Silva	17 December 2019	0.89
Laura is a woman who suffers from obesity and is obsessed with losing weight. Her husband despises her and teases her, but before society she pretends to have a perfect marriage. Until one day he discovers that her husband Manuel is unfaithful, and that he also wants to steal all her money to go with her lover. So, without thinking, Laura makes a decision that will change her completely and that will make her end up in prison sentenced to 19 years in jail. Cast: Salvador Zerboni as Manuel, Estefanía Villarreal as Laura Sánchez, Susana Rentería as Alma, Susana Posada as Clara, Kris Cifuentes as Jaime, Max Landon as Manuel's son
7	"Speed"	Conrado Martínez	Patricia Rodríguez	18 December 2019	0.83
Cornered by the pressure of their responsibilities, Eugenia, a single mother of 35 years, tests amphetamines and gradually loses control and consumption increases. Cast: Luz Ramos as Eugenia Hernández, Gregorio Urquijo as David, Carlos Fonseca as El Profesor, Manuel Castillo as Tomás, Rodolfo Carderón as Gabo, Flor Payán as Carla
8	"Acosado"	Carlos Moreno	Gennys Pérez	19 December 2019	0.56
Miguel Sandí is a music teacher admired for his talent. The day he was appointed director of the most important conservatory in the city, a complaint against him appears for violation. Cast: Christian Tappan as Miguel Sandí, Bibiana Navas as Rosario Olmedo, Estefania Piñeres as Lorena, Krystal Restrepo as Iztel, Tatiana Barrero as Claudia, Walter Luengas, Ricardo Margalí, Laura González as Patty Sandí, Camilo Upegui as Santiago "Santi" Sandí, Felipe Salazar as Lorenzo, Hanz Hormaza as Tony
9	"Decidí volver"	Javier Fox Patrón	Carlos Fernández de Soto	20 December 2019	0.94
Adriana is a woman who suffers from depression because she is a mature woman and meets Ramiro in prison, because of this situation begins a relationship with him, but everything gets complicated when Ramiro begins to mistreat her. Cast: Irán Castillo as Adriana, Pepe Gámez as Javier, Carlos Speitzer as Ramiro Loaiza, Lourdes Reyes as Valentina, Alejander Thierry as Juan, Leonardo Alonso as Detective Salas,
10	"Los timadores"	Nicolás Reyes	Antonio Nogales	23 December 2019	0.86
Gloria is a mother who from a young age with her son Nicolás has been responsible for scamming multiple entrepreneurs. Until one day she decides to leave Nicolás and make a new life with her husband, with whom she has a child. But everything gets out of control when Nicolás reappears in his life to blackmail her. Cast: Marcela Carvajal as Gloria, Felipe Arcila as Nicolás Contreras, Adriana Silva as Teresa, Juan Carlos Solarte as Federico Santos, Juan Sebastián Díez as Lucas Santos, Édgar Rojas as Agustín Echeverri
11	"La venganza"	Conrado Martínez	Erick Hernández	25 December 2019	0.78
Moisés is a veterinary doctor who has taken care of his daughter Verónica since his wife died. Thanks to her profession, her daughter has become an excellent student who supports animals and helps to stop the violence against them, but unfortunately she runs into Federico, a young student with mental problems who becomes obsessed with her to the point. to discuss and fight with Verónica and following the fight she is in a coma. So now Moisés must make a decision. Cast: Alberto Casanova as Moisés Sánchez, Macarena García as Verónica Sánchez, Juan Pablo Gil as Federico Lombardi, Sara Manni as Alicia, Rodrigo Rojo as Detective John Meléndez
12	"Regalo de vida"	Claudia Pedraza	Erick Hernández Juan Ponce	26 December 2019	0.97
Margarita is a nurse, who unknowingly suffers from Alzheimer's. But upon learning of her illness she decides to get her doctor to kill her by claiming an act of euthanasia, regardless of her daughter Flora's feelings. Cast: Zharick León as Margarita, Margalida Castro as Justina, Alejandra Chamorro as Flora, Julián Delgado as Josué, Mauricio Navas as Dr. Serrano,
13	"Amor de madre"	Otto Rodríguez	Felipe Silva	27 December 2019	0.73
Bibi Molina is a 19-year-old girl who suffers from abuse by her mother from her mother Dina Cano. Dina makes everyone believe that her daughter suffers from multiple diseases that prevent her from being a normal person. Meanwhile Bibi is looking for a way to get rid of her mother, so she will have to make decisions that will put her life and her freedom at stake. Cast: Ana María Estupiñán as Bibi Molina, Jeannette Lehr as Dina Cano, Laura Rosguer as Linda, Santiago Bitart as Ignacio Castillo
14	"El sobreviviente"	Javier Patrón Fox	Antonio Nogales	30 December 2019	0.71
15	"Pacto de silencio"	Nicolás Reyes	Yamile Daza Andrés Guzmán Diego Osorio	1 January 2020	0.51
16	"El marido perfecto"	Conrado Martínez	Felipe Silva	2 January 2020	0.71
17	"La guerra en casa"	Héctor Márquez	Erick Hernández	3 January 2020	0.59
18	"El sustituto"	Héctor Márquez	Antonio Nogales	6 January 2020	0.73
19	"Condenada a ser bella"	Claudia Pedraza	Piedad Arango Conchita Ruiz	7 January 2020	0.77
20	"90 días"	Javier Fox Patrón	Gilda Santana	8 January 2020	0.83
21	"Indigna justicia"	Claudia Pedraza	Yamile Daza Andrés Guzmán Diego Osorio	9 January 2020	0.60
22	"Tiquete One Way"	Nicolás Reyes	Yamile Daza Diego Osorio	10 January 2020	0.77
23	"Affaire"	Claudia Pedraza	Bibiana Mayorga	13 January 2020	0.67
24	"El escolta"	Claudia Pedraza	Bibiana Mayorga	14 January 2020	0.72
25	"Encerrados"	Javier Fox Patrón	María Cecilia Boenheim Jörg Hiller	15 January 2020	0.78
26	"Miradas que matan"	Conrado Martínez	Felipe Silva	16 January 2020	0.67
27	"Dominium"	Unknown	Unknown	17 January 2020	0.68
28	"Amor adolescente"	Unknown	Unknown	20 September 2020	N/A
29	"La casa en el jardín"	Unknown	Unknown	27 September 2020	N/A
30	"La historia de María"	Unknown	Unknown	4 October 2020	N/A
31	"¿Qué pasó con Mara?"	Unknown	Unknown	11 October 2020	N/A
32	"El sótano"	Unknown	Unknown	18 October 2020	N/A
33	"La desaparición de Ana"	Unknown	Unknown	25 October 2020	N/A
34	"Juana, la mataviejitas"	Unknown	Unknown	1 November 2020	N/A
35	"El mal menor"	Unknown	Unknown	8 November 2020	N/A
36	"El filtro"	Unknown	Unknown	15 November 2020	N/A
37	"Abandonada"	Unknown	Unknown	29 November 2020	N/A
