= Julián Farietta =

Colombian actor and model

- Born: Julián Muñoz Farietta; 10 April 1988 (age 37); Bogotá, Colombia
- Occupations: Actor, model

Julián Farietta (born 10 April 1988), is a Colombian actor and model.

== Filmography ==
| Year | Title | Role | Notes |
|---|---|---|---|
| 2009-10 | Victorinos | Camilo Mora | TV debut |
| 2009 | Sin senos no hay paraíso | | TV series |
| 2011 | Tu Voz Estéreo | | TV series |
| 2014-2016 | La viuda negra | Michael Corleone Blanco | Co-protagonist |
| 2017 | Sin senos sí hay paraíso | Gatillo | TV series |
