= Majida Issa =

Colombian actress (born 1981)

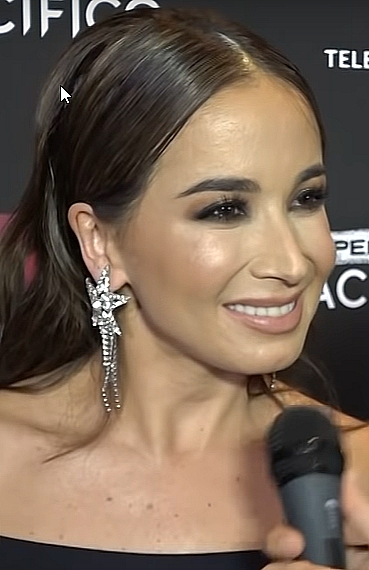
- Issa in 2020
- Born: Majida Margarita Issa Bellotto; June 27, 1981 (age 45); San Andrés, Colombia
- Occupations: Actress, singer
- Years active: 2005–present
- Notable work: Sin senos sí hay paraíso
- Spouse: Mijail Mulkay (m. 2010–2012)
- Parent(s): Waydi Issa; Ylia Bellotto
- Relatives: Teresa Gutiérrez (grandmother); Miguel Varoni (uncle)

Majida Margarita Issa Bellotto (born June 27, 1981) is a Colombian actress, best known for her role as Yésica Beltrán "La Diabla" in Telemundo's telenovela Sin senos sí hay paraíso (2016–2018).

== Early life and education ==
Issa studied acting at the Escuela Nacional de Arte Teatral in Mexico.

She is the granddaughter of Teresa Gutiérrez and the niece of Miguel Varoni.

She is of Italian and Lebanese descent.

== Career ==
Issa gained recognition for her role as Yésica Beltrán, alias "La Diabla", in the three seasons of the television series Sin senos sí hay paraíso, a sequel to Sin senos no hay paraíso.

On April 20, 2024, Issa was a guest at the 11th Platino Awards, held in Riviera Maya, Mexico. During the gala, she sang alongside Mariaca Semprún and Ana Guerra.

== Personal life ==
In 2010, she married Mijail Mulkay. They dated for two years before their wedding. The couple later divorced in 2012.

== Filmography ==
Television roles
Year	Title	Roles	Notes
2008	El cartel	Soledad	
2008	La quiero a morir	Yuri	
2009–2010	Niños ricos, pobres padres	Martha Granados	
2010	Amor sincero	Mercedes Doval "Mechi"	
2010	El Clon	Rania Castañeda de la caridad	
2010	Los caballeros las prefieren brutas	Lili	Episode: "Hay que matarlos, de ganas"
2012	Las Santísimas	Carmen Pulido	
2012–2013	Corazones blindados	Diana Ochoa	Main role; 139 episodes
2014	La ronca de oro	Sofía Helena Vargas Marulanda "Helenita"	Main role
2015	Lady, la vendedora de rosas	Fátima Tabares	Main role
2016–2018	Sin senos sí hay paraíso	Yésica Beltrán "La Diabla"	Main role (seasons 1–3); 226 episodes
2017–2018	La luz de mis ojos	Faride Chadid	Main role
2019	La Guzmán	Alejandra Guzmán	Main role; 60 episodes
2020	Operación pacífico	Captain Amalia Ortega	Main role
2022	Enfermeras	Alex Luján	Main role
2022	Noticia de un secuestro	Diana Turbay	
2022	Leandro Díaz	Nellys Soto	9 episodes
2024	La sustituta	Eva Cortés	Main role
