= Gregorio Pernía =

Colombian television actor

- Born: Fernando José Gregorio Pernía Maldonado; May 7, 1970 (age 55); Cúcuta, Colombia
- Occupation: Actor
- Years active: 1995–present
- Children: 5

Gregorio Pernía (born Fernando José Gregorio Pernía Maldonado; May 7, 1970, Cúcuta, Colombia) is a Colombian actor of television.

== Filmography ==
=== Television roles ===
Year	Title	Roles	Notes
1995	Tiempos difíciles	Vicente Márquez	
1997	La Mujer del Presidente	Villanueva's cab driver	Uncredited
1997	Yo amo a Paquita Gallego	Aníbal Cevero	
1998	La madre	Federico Suárez Caicedo	
2001	Isabel me la veló	José Luis "Pepe Grillo" Umaña	
2002	Milagros de amor	Miguel Abril / Emilio Luna	
2004	Las noches de Luciana	Primitivo	
2006–2007	La hija del mariachi	Manuel Rodríguez	
2008–2009	Sin senos no hay paraíso	Aurelio Jaramillo "El Titi"	
2009	Las detectivas y el Víctor	Víctor García	Main role; 145 episodes
2010	Eye for an Eye	Many Monsalve	Main role; 98 episodes
2011	Flor Salvaje	Mariano Guerrero	Main antagonist; 150 episodes
2011	Decisiones extremas	Nicolás	Episode: "Justicia ciega"
2012–2013	Corazón valiente	Javier del Toro "El Verdugo" / Javier Falcón	
2013	Tres Caínes	Fidel Castaño "Rambo"	Main role; 79 episodes
2015	La esquina del diablo	Santiago Arenas "Yago"	Main role; 70 episodes
2016–2019	Sin senos sí hay paraíso	Aurelio Jaramillo "El Titi"	Recurring role (season 1), main role (seasons 2–4); 249 episodes
2020	Decisiones: Unos ganan, otros pierden	TBA	
2021	Así se baila	Participant, alongside his daughter Luna	Winner
2022	Hasta que la plata nos separe	Luciano Valenzuela	
2024	La casa de los famosos	Housemate	Walked on Day 30 (season 4)
