= Johanna Fadul =

Colombian actress and model

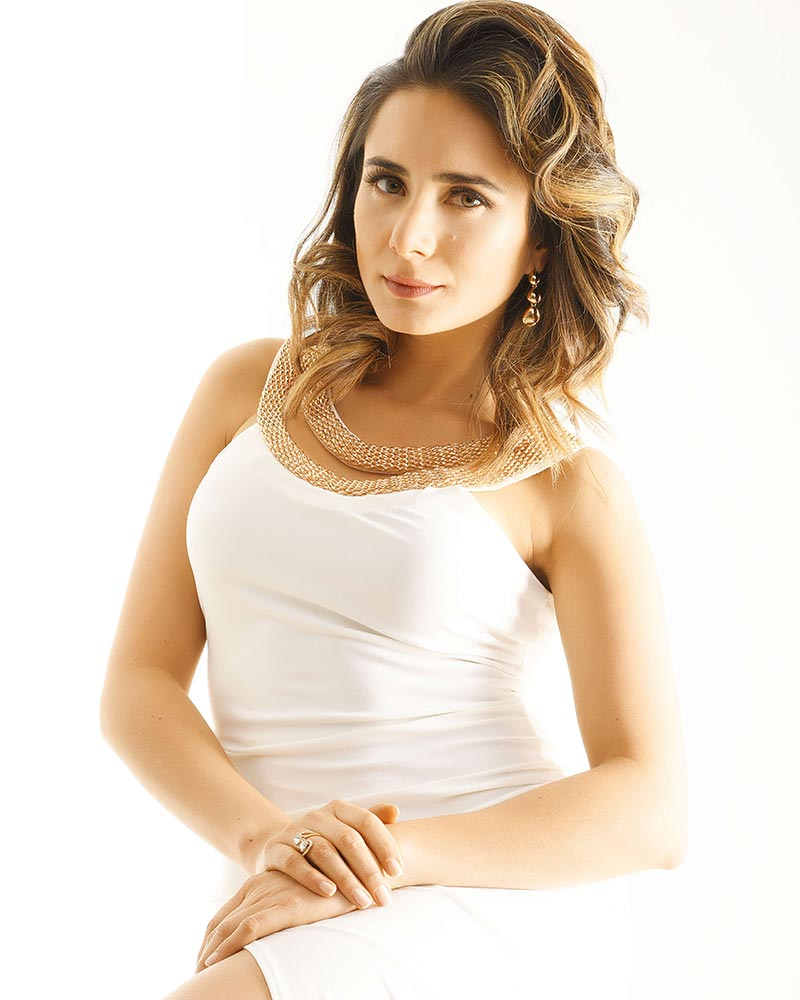
- Fadul in 2015
- Born: Johanna Elena Rojas Fadul; 5 September 1985 (age 40); Bogotá, Colombia
- Occupation: Actress
- Years active: 2003–present
- Spouse: Juan Sebastián Quintero (m. 2015)

Johanna Elena Rojas Fadul (born September 5, 1985) is a Colombian actress and model. She made herself known in the Colombian series Padres e Hijos, and later starred as Daniela Barrera in the Telemundo series Sin senos sí hay paraíso.

== Personal life ==
Fadul is of Lebanese descent. She is married to the Colombian actor and presenter Juan Sebastián Quintero. The couple had two children, Antonella and Anabella, who did not make it through childbirth. The doctor present baptized the babies and the couple scattered their ashes in the sea of Coveñas.

== Filmography ==
Television roles
Year	Title	Roles	Notes
2003–2005	Padres e hijos	Daniela	
2016–2018	Sin senos sí hay paraíso	Daniela Barrera	Main role (season 1–2), guest (season 3); 163 episodes
2018	Exatlón Colombia	Herself	Contestant; 15 episodes
2020	Operación pacífico	Mariana Ortega	Main role; 40 episodes
2024	Los 50	Herself	Contestant (season 2)
2026	La casa de los famosos Colombia	Herself	Contestant (season 3)
