= Juan Pablo Llano =

Colombian actor and model

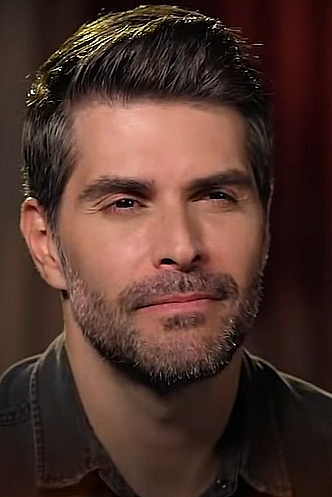
- Born: Juan Pablo Llano Echeverry
- Occupation: Actor model
- Years active: 2002–present
- Spouse: Catalina Gómez (m. 2004)
- Children: 2

Juan Pablo Llano is a Colombian actor and model.

== Filmography ==
Year	Title	Role	Notes
2002	Historias de hombres sólo para mujeres	Sebastián	
2003	El auténtico Rodrigo Leal	César Domínguez	
2004	Francisco el matemático	Manuel Mejía	
2004	Dora, la celadora	José Jaramillo	
2005	Decisiones	Carlos	Episode: "En sábado no toca"
2006	El engaño	Unknown role	
2007	Dame chocolate	Santiago	
2009	Las detectivas y el Víctor	Juan Pablo Andrade / Édgar Millán	
2010	Aurora	Ramiro	
2010–2011	El fantasma de Elena	Walter	
2011–2012	Una Maid en Manhattan	Bruno Rivera	
2012	Grachi	Ignacio "Nacho" Novoa	Series regular (season 2); 52 episodes
2012	Secreteando	Tony	Episode: "El chisme de los chismes"
2014	La virgen de la calle	Mauricio Vega	Main role; 120 episodes
2015	Dueños del paraíso	Ignacio Elizondo	Series regular; 60 episodes
2015–2016	Bajo el mismo cielo	Erick Vilalta	Series regular; 38 episodes
2016–2019	Sin senos sí hay paraíso	Daniel Cerón	Main role (seasons 1–4); guest (seasons 2–3); 182 episodes
2019	El Barón	Mauricio Jaramillo	Recurring role; 9 episodes
2022	Amores que engañan	Antonie	Episode: "Mía solo mía"
2023–2024	Vuelve a mí	Gregorio Fernández "El Sapo"	Recurring role
