= Catherine Siachoque =

Colombian actress (born 1972)

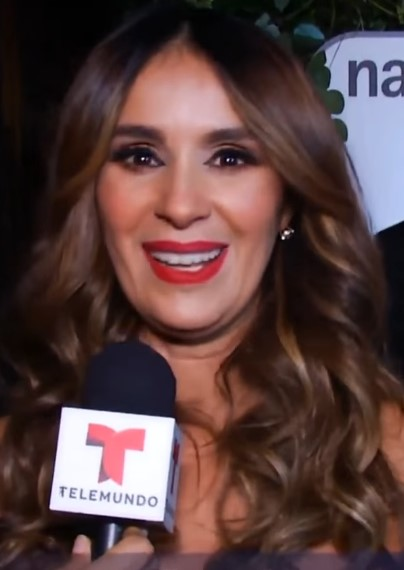
- Siachoque in 2016
- Born: María Alexandra Catherine Siachoque Gaete; 21 January 1972 (age 54); Bogotá, Colombia
- Other name: Cathy
- Occupations: Actress, dancer
- Years active: 1995–present
- Spouse: Miguel Varoni (m. 1999)

María Alexandra Catherine Siachoque Gaete (born 21 January 1972) is a Colombian actress best known for her roles in telenovelas.

== Early life ==
Siachoque was born in Bogota, Colombia.

== Career ==
Siachoque has starred in Telemundo-produced telenovelas including Pecados ajenos, Tierra de Pasiones, Te voy a enseñar a querer, La Venganza, Amantes del desierto, and the TV anthology series Decisiones. After being typecast as a villainess, she played a sympathetic character as Doña Hilda Santana in Sin senos no hay paraíso.

In 2010, Siachoque starred in the Telemundo remake of ¿Dónde está Elisa?, starring Sonya Smith, Gabriel Porras and Jorge Luis Pila. Siachoque portrayed as Cecilia Altamira, the aunt of missing daughter Elisa Altamira (Vanessa Pose). In 2011, she played the role of Ignacia Conde in La casa de al lado alongside real-life husband Miguel Varoni, together with Maritza Rodríguez and Gabriel Porras. In 2014, she starred as a villainess in Reina de Corazónes, with Paola Núñez, Eugenio Siller and Juan Soler. From 2016 to 2019, Siachoque reprised the role of Hilda Santana in Sin senos sí hay paraíso. In 2025, Siachoque marked her debut in TelevisaUnivision for Juan Osorio's telenovela Amanecer, starring Fernando Colunga and Livia Brito. She portrayed Amapola Talavera, a witch and veterinarian who is obsessed with Leonel Carranza (Colunga).

== Personal life ==
She is married to Argentine-Colombian producer, actor and director Miguel Varoni since 1999; they have been together since 1996. Siachoque and Varoni acted together in the telenovelas Te voy a enseñar a querer and La casa de al lado. They met each other during the filming of Las Juanas.

== Filmography ==
Television roles
Year	Title	Roles	Notes
1995	Sobrevivir	Perla	Main role
1995–1996	La sombra del deseo	Lorena Núñez	Supporting role; 110 episodes
1997	Las Juanas	Juana Caridad Galante / Salguero	Lead role; 110 episodes
1998	La sombra del arco iris	Silvia Stella Graniani	Main role; 63 episodes
1998–1999	Tan cerca y tan lejos	Laura	Main role; 55 episodes
1999–2000	La guerra de las Rosas	Rosa Emilia Carrillo	Main role; 161 episodes
2001	Amantes del desierto	Micaela Fernández	Main role; 110 episodes
2002–2003	La venganza	Grazzia Fontana	Main role; 127 episodes
2004–2005	Te voy a enseñar a querer	Deborah Buenrostro	Main role; 127 episodes
2005–2006	Decisiones	Gabriela Valencia / Mariana Valencia	Episode: "Todo queda en la familia"
2005–2006	Decisiones	Alma	Episode: "Marcada para siempre"
2006	Tierra de pasiones	Marcia Hernández	Main role; 172 episodes
2007–2008	Pecados ajenos	Inés Vallejo	Main role; 167 episodes
2008–2009	Sin senos no hay paraíso	Doña Hilda Santana	Main role; 105 episodes
2010	¿Dónde está Elisa?	Cecilia Altamira de Cáceres	Lead role; 106 episodes
2011–2012	La casa de al lado	Ignacia Conde	Main role; 141 episodes
2014	Reina de corazones	Estefanía Pérez de Hidalgo "La Reina de Diamantes"	Main role; 140 episodes
2016–2018	Sin senos sí hay paraíso	Doña Hilda Santana	Main role (seasons 1–3); 240 episodes
2017	La Fan	Isabel Pinzón "La Directora"	Guest role; 2 episodes
2019	El final del paraíso	Doña Hilda Santana	Main role (season 4); 82 episodes
2022	Oscuro deseo	Lys Antoine	Main cast (season 2); 15 episodes
2022	Mujeres asesinas	Blanca	Episode: "Bodas de plata"
2024	Consuelo	Olga Pontón de Acevedo	Main role
2024	La mujer de mi vida	Marcela Giménez Mello	Main role
2024	Secretos de villanas	Herself	Main cast; Season 3
2025	Amanecer	Amapola Talavera	Main cast
