= Roberto Manrique =

Ecuadorian model, and actor (born 1979)

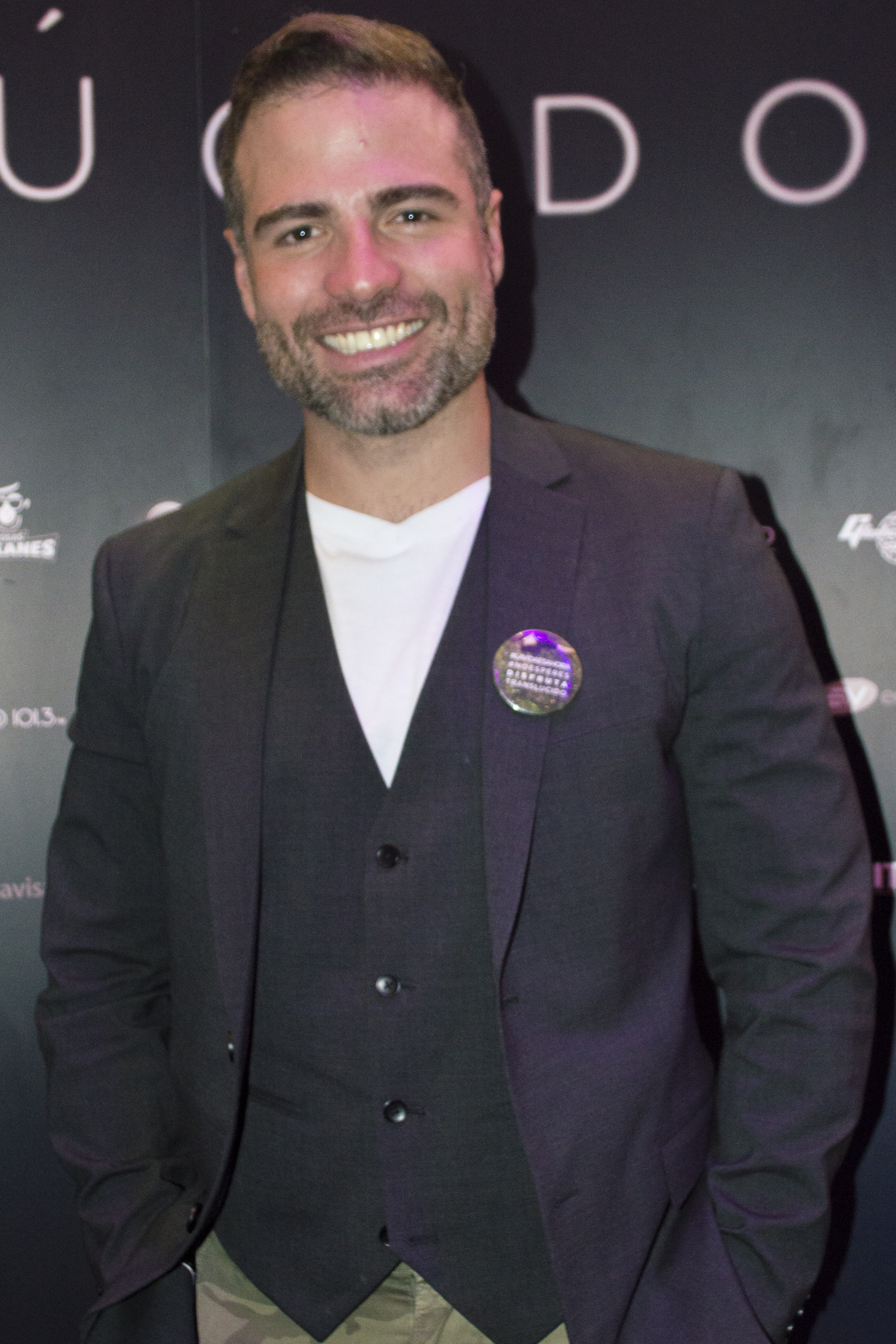
- Manrique in 2016
- Born: Roberto Manrique Miranda; 23 April 1979 (age 47); Guayaquil, Ecuador
- Occupation: Actor

Roberto Manrique (born 23 April 1979) is an Ecuadorian model, and actor best known for his roles in telenovelas. Starting his career in Ecuador, and later doing telenovelas for Telemundo in Colombia.

== Biography ==
Manrique was born in Guayaquil, Ecuador, the youngest of five children. Xavier, Manrique's father, was a cardiologist and his mother, Mencha Miranda, was a dedicated educator. He studied at the Liceo Panamericano primary, where he was involved in all kinds of artistic activities that particularly stood out as a student participation. It also showed interest in the topics of social awareness, as part of groups like the Nature Foundation and undertaking campaigns that touched these issues on their own initiative and their friends like.

When choosing a career, Roberto chose the Social Communication with a concentration in Graphic Design at the Universidad Casa Grande in Guayaquil. "I remember it as one of the best times of my life, in which I could discover and develop my creativity, expands my personality and discover the career potential it had "While studying experienced and performed several jobs and trades, including Cinemark teller, TV presenter and creative advertising at BBDO, where he started out as a promising publicist. However, he decided to leave these jobs to concentrate on finishing his college career that culminated with honors since Roberto received the award for most creative student, he graduated in Technical Advertising (2000) and its degree in Communications (2002).

Upon completion of this phase of education and pursue professional communication Spiral mounted an advertising agency in order to work in Social Marketing. Despite economic success, he felt dissatisfied. To take a radical turn to his life, he closed his agency and traveled to Peru, where he worked as a waiter one time free of responsibilities as he wished. After his father was diagnosed with cancer, he returned to Ecuador and pursued a career in acting. A short time later, Roberto received his first acting opportunity and enter the talent to be part of a series called The Sorceress.

== Personal life ==
On August 27, 2021, Manrique publicly came out as gay and said that he had been in a relationship with his current boyfriend for seven years.

== Filmography ==
Television roles
Year	Title	Roles	Notes
2007–2008	Victoria	Sebastián Villanueva	
2008–2009	Doña Bárbara	María Nieves González	Series regular; 190 episodes
2008	Mujeres asesinas	Unknown role	Episode: "Claudia, La Cuchillera"
2009–2010	Victorinos	Victorino Manjarrés	Main role; 152 episodes
2010	Los caballeros las prefieren brutas	Daniel	Episode: "La habilidad y la química"
2010	El Clon	Alejandro "Snake" Cortés	Series regular; 181 episodes
2011–2012	Flor Salvaje	Sacramento Iglesias	Main role; 150 episodes
2013–2014	Marido en alquiler	José Enrique "Kike" Salinas Carrasco	Main role; 141 episodes
2017–2018	Sin senos sí hay paraíso	Santiago Sanín	Main role (seasons 2–3); 150 episodes
2019	El final del paraíso	Santiago Sanín	Main role (season 4); 82 episodes

== Theater ==
- 2014: Los hombres no mienten - Maximiliano
- 2014: Mitad y Mitad
- 2012: Confesiones del Pene
- 2012: Herejía
- 2010: El Clon
- 2009: Victorinos
- 2009: La gata sobre el tejado caliente
- 2006: Humor de Chéjov en un acto
- 2005: Pentagrama cultural
- 2004: Venecia
- 2003: A la sombra del volcán
