= TIS Productions =

Colombian television production company

- Formerly: Producciones Bernardo Romero Pereiro (1996–1999); Producciones Telecolombia (1999–2007); Fox TeleColombia (2007–2021); TeleColombia (2021–2022); TIS Productions (2022–present)
- Type: Subsidiary
- Industry: Television production
- Founded: 1996; 30 years ago
- Founder: Samuel Duque Rozo; René Gómez; Bernardo Romero Pereiro
- Headquarters: Bogotá, Colombia
- Parent: Fox International Channels/Fox Networks Group (2007–2019); The Walt Disney Company Latin America (2019–2021); Paramount Networks Americas (2021–2026); Skydance Latin America and Caribbean (2026-present)
- Website: https://tisproductions.com/

TIS Productions, commonly known as just TIS (abbreviation for The Independent Studios) and formerly known as Estudios TeleMéxico, Fox TeleColombia and TeleColombia, is a Colombian television production company owned by the Skydance Latin America and Caribbean division of Skydance Corporation.

== History ==
=== Programmes ===
Founded in 1996 by Samuel Duque, René Gómez and Bernardo Romero Pereiro as a production company owned by the latter, who is also a claimed librettist of Colombian dramatizations and soap operas, the company is known for supplying programming to Telemundo, Telefutura, RCN Televisión and the channels of the defunct former national broadcaster, Inravisión.

Previous logo as Fox Telecolombia from 2007 to 2021.

Previous logo as TeleColombia from 2021 to 2022 following the merger between Disney and Fox and before its sale in 2021 to ViacomCBS.

In 2007, the Fox International Channels (later the Fox Networks Group) division of the Fox Entertainment Group bought a 51% share in the company, thus renaming it as Fox Telecolombia.

In 2009, Fox produced filmed Mental, the first television series produced in Latin America for its eponymous American and international channels, at the Fox Telecolombia complex in Bogotá, but it only lasted for a season.

=== Disney era (2019-2021) ===
Following the completed acquisition of 21st Century Fox by The Walt Disney Company on 20 March 2019, Fox TeleColombia was placed under the direct supervision of The Walt Disney Company Latin America alongside Disney Channel. On 18 January 2021, Disney dropped the "Fox" word from the company's name, hence renaming it to just TeleColombia, in line with the acquisition terms which required phasing out the "Fox" brand to avoid confusion with the spun-out Fox Corporation, however around 2021, Disney prepared the sales because it clashed Disney's business goals.

=== Paramount era (2021-present) ===
On 28 October 2021, ViacomCBS (later Paramount Global; which owned KCAL-TV and Miramax, which were formerly owned by Disney, but now under their library) announced its acquisition of a majority stake in the company from Disney, which closed on 23 November that year, thus changing sister stations to Nickelodeon, while keeping the company's founders on board with their roles from a creative and advisory point of view. Paramount then merged Estudios TeleMexico and TeleColombia under the name TIS on 22 October 2022.
