= Cuando vivas conmigo =

- Also known as: Against Our Destiny
- Genre: Telenovela
- Starring: Caterin Escobar; Diego Trujillo; Sandra Reyes; Christian Tappan; Linda Lucía Callejas; María José Vargas; Diego Garzón; Norma Nivia; Juan Manuel Lenis
- Opening theme: "Cuando vivas conmigo" by José Alfredo Jiménez
- Country of origin: Colombia
- Original language: Spanish
- No. of episodes: 72

Production
- Production locations: Bogotá; Girardot, Cundinamarca; Ibagué, Tolima
- Running time: 60 minutes
- Production company: Caracol Televisión

Original release
- Network: Caracol Televisión
- Release: May 27, 2013 – January 10, 2014

Related
- The Girl; Polvo carnavalero

Cuando vivas conmigo (English title: Against Our Destiny) is a Colombian telenovela produced and broadcast by Caracol Televisión, starring Caterin Escobar, Diego Trujillo, Sandra Reyes, Christian Tappan, Linda Lucía Callejas, María José Vargas, Diego Garzón, Norma Nivia and Juan Manuel Lenis. It is based on the novel The Discreet Hero by Mario Vargas Llosa. It premiered on September 19, 2016 and concluded on January 6, 2017.

== Cast ==
- Caterin Escobar as Armida López
- María José Vargas as Young Armida López
- Diego Trujillo as Ismael Herrera
- Sandra Reyes as Gertrudis López
- Karen Novoa as Young Gertrudis López
- Christian Tappan as Felicito Yanequé
- Linda Lucía Callejas as Josefa Méndez
- Diego Garzón as Miguel Yanequé
- Norma Nivia as Magdalena Herrera
- Juan Manuel Lenis as Ignacio "Escobita" Herrera
- José Daniel Cristancho as Tiburcio Yanequé
- Freddy Ordóñez as Sergeant Carlos Alberto Lituma
- Víctor Hugo Morant as Captain Óscar Silva
- Fernando Lara as Father Pepín Odonoban
- Kimberly Reyes as Mabel Barraza Muñoz
- Gary Forero as Foncho Martínez
- Ana Victoria Beltrán as Martha Contreras
- Tatiana Rentería as Lucila
- Juan Carlos Messier as Claudio
- Luis Fernando Salas as Narciso Veranda
- Juan Pablo Obregón as Albeiro Jaramillo
- Alex Adames as Gerardo
- Tatiana Arango as Johanna Rodríguez
- Laura Peñuela as Aurora
- Santiago Moure as Orlando Camargo
- Inés Oviedo as Briggith
- Juan David Galindo as Rigoberto
- Luz Stella Luengas Díaz as Dalila Romero
- Zulma Muñoz Ruiz as Constanza
- Alberto León Jaramillo as Francisco "Don Pacho" Martínez
- Alejandro Gutiérrez as Colorado Bignolo
- Katherine Castrillón as Margarita Manrique
- Lady Noriega as the muse
- Juana del Río as "La Silenciosa"
- Diego Armando Landaeta as Luis Veranda
- Shirley Gómez as Andrea
- Isabel Cristina Villarreal
- Ana Sofía Jiménez
- María Irene Toro

== Awards and nominations ==
Year	Awards	Category	Recipient	Result
2017	Premios India Catalina	Outstanding lead actor in telenovela or series	Christian Tappan	Nominated
2017	Premios TVyNovelas Colombia	Better actress antagonistic of series	Kimberly Reyes	Nominated
2017	Premios TVyNovelas Colombia	Best musical theme	Cuando vivas conmigo	Nominated

== Remake ==
- Cuando Vivas Conmigo was remade as Dua Takdir Cinta in Malaysia by Global Station Sdn Bhd which last episode premieres 6 April 2020.
