= Metastasis (disambiguation) =

Metastasis may refer to:

- Metastasis, the spread of a pathogenic agent beyond its initial site, most often referring to cancer
- Metastases, (Croatian: Metastaze) 2009 Croatian crime drama
- Metastaseis, (Greek: Μεταστάσεις; French: Metastasis), orchestral work by Iannis Xenakis
- Metástasis, 2014 Colombian telenovela series

== See also ==
- Tumorigenesis
