= Pedro el escamoso: más escamoso que nunca =

- Genre: Comedy drama
- Created by: Luis Felipe Salamanca
- Based on: Pedro el escamoso by Luis Felipe Salamanca & Dago García
- Directed by: Juan Carlos Vásquez; Andrés Marroquín; Juan Carlos Villamizar
- Starring: Miguel Varoni; Carlos Torres
- Composers: José Ricaurte; Samuel Lizarralde
- Country of origin: Colombia
- Original language: Spanish
- No. of seasons: 1
- No. of episodes: 23

Production
- Executive producers: Lisette Osorio; Fernando Barbosa; Dago García; Amparo Gutiérrez; Ángela Vergara; Juan Carlos Villamizar; Fernando Semenzato; Leonardo Aranguibel; Gastón Moguilevsky
- Editor: Claudia Acevedo
- Production company: Caracol Televisión

Original release
- Network: Disney+; Caracol Televisión
- Release: 16 July 2024

Pedro el escamoso: más escamoso que nunca is a Colombian television series created by Luis Felipe Salamanca. The series is a sequel of Pedro el escamoso, the second sequel from that series after Como Pedro por su casa. It stars Miguel Varoni and Carlos Torres. It premiered on 16 July 2024 on Caracol Televisión and Disney+.

== Cast ==
- Miguel Varoni as Pedro Coral Tavera
- Carlos Torres as Pedro Coral Jr.
- Ana María Trujillo as Fernanda Ríos
- Melanie Dell'Olmo as Mariana
- Sandra Reyes as Paula Davila
- Álvaro Bayona as Pastor Fernando Gaitán García
- Luz Estrada as Elvira Pacheco
- Juan Carlos Arango as Enrique Bueno Lindo
- Andrea Guzmán as Yadira del Pilar Pacheco Pataquiva
- Antonio Gil as Julio
- Marcela Mar as Mayerli del Carmen Pacheco Pataquiva
- Fernando Lara
- Laura Junco as Lucero
- Lorena García as Catalina
- Alisson Joan Castrillón as Luciana "Luly"
- Eduardo Pérez
- Carolina Serrano as Margarita "Margie"
- Daniel Martínez
- Daniela García
- María José Delgado
- María José Camacho as Lucía
- Valentina Gómez
- Francisco Chona

== Production ==
In April 2023, it was reported that Caracol Televisión was developing a sequel to Pedro el escamoso. The series was ordered on 12 October 2023, with Miguel Varoni reprising his role as Pedro Coral Tavera. On 24 January 2024, it was announced that Carlos Torres had joined the cast. Torres is set to assume the role of Pedro's now adult son Pedro Jr. A total of 23 episodes have been ordered for the series.

== Episodes ==
No.	Title	Original release date	Caracol Televisión air date	Colombia linear viewers (Rating points)
1	"Pedro Coral regresa a Colombia para ver a su hijo"	16 July 2024	16 July 2024	9.8
2	"Pedro inicia su plan de conquista con Fernanda"	16 July 2024	17 July 2024	10.3
3	"Pedro busca trabajo y tiene un emotivo encuentro"	16 July 2024	18 July 2024	9.6
4	"Pedro y la doctora Paula se reencuentran"	16 July 2024	19 July 2024	9.0
5	"Pedro llega a su primer día de trabajo como mensajero"	16 July 2024	22 July 2024	9.3
6	"Pedro habla de su pasado con Fernanda"	16 July 2024	23 July 2024	8.6
7	"La doctora Paula se entera de que se está muriendo"	16 July 2024	24 July 2024	8.3
8	"Pedro descubre la dolorosa realidad de la doctora Paula"	16 July 2024	25 July 2024	9.1
9	"¿Fernanda debe elegir entre Pedro y Mariana?"	16 July 2024	26 July 2024	8.1
10	"Mariana toma una radical decisión al enterarse de su papá"	16 July 2024	29 July 2024	9.7
11	"Pedro y Fernanda tienen su primera noche de pasión"	16 July 2024	30 July 2024	9.1
12	"Mientras vive su amor, Pedro recibe una terrible noticia"	16 July 2024	31 July 2024	9.2
13	"Mariana descubre la verdad sobre el papá de Pedro Jr."	16 July 2024	1 August 2024	9.3
14	"Fernanda descubre una verdad impactante de Pedro"	16 July 2024	2 August 2024	9.6
15	"Pedro Jr. conoce a Lucía gracias a su padre"	16 July 2024	5 August 2024	8.5
16	"Fernanda se niega a hablar con Pedro y sus sentimientos"	16 July 2024	6 August 2024	8.4
17	"Pedro Jr. y Mariana se reconcilian"	16 July 2024	8 August 2024	9.1
18	"Pedro y Fernanda deciden si se convertirán en pareja"	16 July 2024	9 August 2024	9.2
19	"La infidelidad de Mariana sale a la luz"	16 July 2024	12 August 2024	9.7
20	"¿Pedro Jr. termina su relación con Mariana?"	16 July 2024	13 August 2024	10.4
21	"Pedro se convierte en accionista de la empresa"	16 July 2024	14 August 2024	9.9
22	"Pedro se despide de la mujer que cambió su vida"	16 July 2024	15 August 2024	9.5
23	"Un matrimonio cierra con broche de oro esta historia"	16 July 2024	16 August 2024	9.3

== Release ==
The series premiered internationally on 16 July 2024 on Disney+, with all 23 episodes released. In Colombia, the series began airing weeknights on Caracol Televisión. In the United States, the series premiered on 18 September 2024 on Univision, with Hulu making the series available to its platform a day after its broadcast on Univision.

== Reception ==
=== Ratings ===
Season	Timeslot (COT)	Episodes	First aired		Last aired		Avg. viewers (in points)
Season	Timeslot (COT)	Episodes	Date	Viewers (in points)	Date	Viewers (in points)	Avg. viewers (in points)
1	Mon–Fri 9:30 p.m.	23	16 July 2024	9.8	16 August 2024	9.3	9.3

=== Awards and nominations ===
Year	Award	Category	Nominated	Result	Ref
2024	Produ Awards	Best Romantic Comedy Series	Pedro el escamoso: más escamoso que nunca	Won	
2024	Produ Awards	Best Lead Actress - Romantic Comedy Series or Miniseries	Ana María Trujillo	Nominated	
2024	Produ Awards	Best Lead Actor - Romantic Comedy Series or Miniseries	Miguel Varoni	Nominated	
2024	Produ Awards	Best Lead Actor - Romantic Comedy Series or Miniseries	Carlos Torres	Nominated	
2025	India Catalina Awards	Best Series	Pedro el escamoso: más escamoso que nunca	Nominated	
2025	India Catalina Awards	Best Lead Actor	Miguel Varoni	Nominated	
2025	India Catalina Awards	Best Supporting Actress	Sandra Reyes	Nominated	
2025	India Catalina Awards	Best Supporting Actor	Carlos Torres	Nominated	
