= Alina Lozano =

Colombian actress & writer (born 1965)

- Born: Alina Lozano Acosta; 6 January 1965 (age 61); Bogotá, Colombia
- Occupation: Actress
- Spouses: Mijail Mulkay (m. 2005; div. 2008) Jim Velásquez (m. 2023)

Alina Lozano Acosta (born 6 January 1965) is a Colombian actress and writer recognized for her many roles on national television, such as Nidia Pacheco in Pedro el escamoso, Esther Pimiento in El último matrimonio feliz, Chief Penagos in Las detectivas y el Víctor, Judith Mora in El tesoro, and Elvira Mora in Pa' quererte.

== Early life and education ==
Alina Lozano was born in Bogotá, Colombia on 6 January 1965. She studied at the National School of Dramatic Art and at the Permanent Theater Research Workshop directed by Santiago García. She also took university classes in hotel management and law, but withdrew from the programs, as she felt "out of place".

She married Cuban actor Mijail Mulkay in 2005. They divorced in 2008. In 2022, she began a relationship with actor Jim Velásquez, and a year later they announced their engagement.

== Acting career ==
Lozano credits Álvaro Rodríguez as her most influential acting teacher. She joined his troupe, El Callejón del Gato, for six years. After performing in the production Bodas de perla, which Dago García broadcast on the program Invitados de medianoche, she was able to move into television, beginning with a role in the comedy Romeo y Buseta in 1991.

Her first film appearance was in 1995's De amores y delitos: el alma del maíz, directed by Patricia Restrepo. This was followed by Time Out in 1998, and A que te cojo ratón in 2000.

In 2002, she received India Catalina and TVyNovelas Awards for her supporting role in the telenovela Pedro el escamoso. She also received an India Catalina Award for Pa' quererte in 2021.

Most recently, she appeared in the telenovelas Til Money Do Us Part in 2022 and La Reina del Sur from 2022 to 2023.

== Writing ==
Lozano cowrote the play El mono sabe a qué palo trepa with actor Julio César Herrera, and they appeared together in a 2012 production of it which toured Colombia, Ecuador, Panama, Miami, and New York. She has also written other plays, such as Gladys canta y sus males espanta.

== Filmography ==
=== TV series ===
Year	Title	Role	Channel
1991	Romeo y Buseta	Perla	Canal 1
1992	Si mañana estoy viva	Bertha	Canal 1
1992	Los motivos de Lola		Canal 1
1993	De pies a cabeza		Canal A
1994	El hijo de Nadia	Nadia Chona	Canal A
1997	Marcelina		Canal A
1998	Dios se lo pague	Juana	Caracol Televisión
1998	Corazón prohibido	Margarita	Canal A
2000	Adónde va Soledad	Samantha	Canal RCN
2001–2003	Pedro el escamoso	Nidia Pacheco	Caracol Televisión
2003	Como Pedro por su casa	Nidia Pacheco	Caracol Televisión
2004	Luna, la heredera	Beatriz	Caracol Televisión
2005	Por amor a Gloria	Sara de Mantilla	Caracol Televisión
2005	El baile de la vida	Inés de Angarita	Caracol Televisión
2005	Vuelo 1503	Mireya González	Caracol Televisión
2006–2007	El engaño	Susana	Caracol Televisión
2007	Mujeres asesinas	Helena, the nun	Canal RCN
2008	Tiempo final	Dolores, the bartender	Fox Channel
2008	Aquí no hay quien viva	ICBF functionary	Canal RCN
2008–2009	El último matrimonio feliz	Esther Pimiento	Canal RCN
2009	Las detectivas y el Víctor	Chief Penagos	Canal RCN
2010–2016	Mujeres al límite	Various characters	Caracol Televisión
2011	A corazón abierto	Nurse's mother	Canal RCN
2011	Los canarios	Ana Díaz Granados	Caracol Televisión
2012	Pobres Rico	Helena Téllez	Canal RCN
2012	Retrato de una mujer	Esther	Canal RCN
2013	Chica vampiro	Andrea Corchuelo	Canal RCN
2013	Crónicas de un sueño	Miriam de García	Canal Capital
2014–2015	Secretos del paraíso	Mercedes	Canal RCN
2015	Diomedes, el cacique de la junta	Dr. Piedad	Canal RCN
2016	Yo soy Franky	Director Elizabeth	Nickelodeon
2016	El tesoro	Judith Ruiz de Murcia	Caracol Televisión
2016–2017	Hilos de sangre azul	Esperanza	Canal RCN
2017	No olvidarás mi nombre	Victoria Mera	Canal RCN
2017	La Nocturna	Doña Adelaida	Caracol Televisión
2017	Infieles	Arminda	Canal 1
2018–2019	Heart's Decree	Lawyer	Canal RCN
2018–2019	Wild District	Francisca	Netflix
2019	Bolívar	Tía Mercedes	Caracol Televisión
2019	El Bronx	Helena Rojas	Caracol Televisión
2019	El Charrito Negro, el sueño de un ídolo		Telecafé
2019–2021	Friendzone	Teresa	Caracol Play
2020	All for Love	Magola de Romero/Magola de Portilla	Caracol Televisión
2020–2021	Pa' quererte	Elvira Mora	Canal RCN
2021	Encuentros cercanos	Cristina	Canal Trece
2021	Felices los cuatro	Algenis Sanabria	Canal TRO
2022	Til Money Do Us Part	Leonor de Méndez	Canal RCN
2022–2023	La Reina del Sur	Margarita	Telemundo

=== Films ===
Year	Title	Role	Director
1995	De amores y delitos: el alma del maíz	Salvadora Tapias	Patricia Restrepo
1998	Time Out	Joana	Sergio Cabrera
2000	A que te cojo ratón	Special appearance	Rodrigo Triana
2002	Como el gato y el ratón	Consuelo de Cristancho	Rodrigo Triana
2003	Tres hombres, tres mujeres	Special appearance	Carlos Hernández
2008	Paraíso travel	Patricia	Simón Brand
2009	Of Love and Other Demons	Abadesa	Hilda Hidalgo
2013	El control	Dora	Felipe Dothée

== Theater ==
- Bodas de Perla
- Inquilina fugaz
- Amores simultáneos
- The Incredible and Sad Tale of Innocent Eréndira and Her Heartless Grandmother
- El viento y la ceniza
- El diálogo del rebusque
- La trifulca y la tresescena
- El mono sabe a qué palo trepa

== Awards and nominations ==
Year	Award	Category	Work	Result	Ref.
2001	TVyNovelas Awards	Best Supporting Actress	Pedro el escamoso	Winner	
2002	India Catalina Awards	Best Supporting Actress	Pedro el escamoso	Winner	
2003	Orquídea Award		Pedro el escamoso	Winner	
2013	TVyNovelas Awards	Best Supporting Telenovela Actress	Pobres Rico	Nominated	
2013	India Catalina Awards	Best Supporting Telenovela Actress	Pobres Rico	Nominated	
2013	India Catalina Awards	Best Supporting Actress	Pedro el escamoso	Winner	
2013	India Catalina Awards	Best Leading Actress in a Series or Miniseries	Crónicas de un sueño	Nominated	
2018	India Catalina Awards	Best Antagonist Actress in a Telenovela or Series	No olvidarás mi nombre	Nominated	
2021	India Catalina Awards	Best Antagonist Actress in a Telenovela or Series	Pa' quererte	Winner	
