= El tesoro =

- Also known as: Digging for Love
- Genre: Telenovela
- Directed by: Luis Orjuela; Juan Carlos Vásquez
- Starring: Vivián Ossa; Julio Pachón; Juan Sebastián Caicedo; Carlos Vergara; Erick Cuéllar; Juliette Pardau; Alina Lozano; Lorna Cepeda
- Country of origin: Colombia
- Original language: Spanish

Production
- Production locations: Bogotá, Colombia; Cartagena, Colombia; Sahagún, Colombia
- Running time: 60 minutes
- Production company: Caracol Televisión

Original release
- Network: Caracol Televisión
- Release: April 20 – August 23, 2016

Related
- Sinú, río de pasiones; Sin senos sí hay paraíso

El tesoro (English: Digging for Love) is a Colombian telenovela produced and broadcast by Caracol Televisión from April 20 to August 23, 2016.

== Cast ==
- Julio Pachón as Silvio Murcia
- Alina Lozano as Judith Ruiz de Murcia
- Juan Sebastián Caicedo as Manuel Otero Cubillos
- Carlos Vergara Montiel as Efraín Otero
- Lorna Cepeda as Nazly Cubillos Rebollo de Otero
- Juliette Pardau as Jenny Murcia Ruiz
- Erick Cuéllar as Richard Murcia Ruiz
- Vivian Ossa as Luz del Sol Otero Cubillos
- Ana Wills as Sara Bermejo
- Jacques Toukhmanian as Sebastián Holguin
- Susana Posada as Doctora Cecilia Zuleta
- Epifanio Arévalo as Dr. Herbert Téllez, «Colombian scientist»
- Jorge Hugo Marin as Alberto Torres
- Alberto Borja as Jacobo Otero
- Ana María Arango as Carola Vda de Suescún
- Alberto Saavedra as Padre Javier
- Bayardo Ardila as Abogado Martinez
- Paula Estrada as Rocío, «Jenny's friend»
- Matias Maldonado as Felipe Franco
- Juan Sebastian Quintero as Santiago Devia
- Fernando Arango as Vargas, «Guardia de la cárcel»
- Michael Steven Henao as Nicolás Holguin Zuleta
- Ismael Barrios as Padre Gabriel
- Alexandra Restrepo as Rosaura Cubillos Rebollo, «hermana de Nazly»
- Ricardo Riveros as «Canal 5 producer»
- Gustavo Navarro as Anibal Bermejo, «Padre de Sara»
- Ana Soler as María Nela de Dangond
- Mónica Uribe as Maritza Benítez
- Néstor Alfonso Rojas as Arnulfo
- Jose Rojas as Rafael Dangond
- Rodolfo Silva as "Alias El mudo"
- Gabriel Ochoa as Henry
- Kepa Amuchastegui as Dr. Matias Holguin †
- Margalida Castro as Adela Otero
- Álvaro Bayona as Francisco Suescún
