= El Capo =

- Written by: Gustavo Bolívar M.
- Directed by: Riccardo Gabrielli R.; Lilo Vilaplana
- Starring: Marlon Moreno; Katherine Velez; Marcela Mar; Maria Adelaida Puerta; Diego Trujillo; Natalia Jerez; Elkin Diaz; Oscar Borda; Manuel Sarmiento

Production
- Producers: Amparo Lopez; Nelson Martinez; Jorge Sastoque Roa

Original release
- Network: RCN Televisión (2009–2010); MundoFox (2012–2014)

Marlon Moreno El Capo, commonly known as El Capo, is a television series made by Fox Telecolombia and CBS Television Studios. written by Gustavo Bolivar for RCN Television, based on its namesake book.

The series follows the story of the fictional drug lord Pedro Pablo León Jaramillo, a man who by necessity, chance and ambition has become the richest and most wanted drug trafficker in Colombia. Despite his immense wealth, Pedro Pablo has maintained a low profile over the course of his life and has kept his role as a drug cartel leader a secret from his friends and family. This strategy has allowed him to fly under the radar of the authorities for years, but has also inadvertently created a complex web of betrayals, loves and hates that grows beyond his control. As the truth is revealed, Pedro Pablo's world begins falling apart around him.

The series aired in the United States from 2009–2014, with the first season (2009–10) airing on the TeleFutura network, and the last two seasons (2012–14) airing on MundoFox.

== Plot ==
In his hidden underground bunker, Pedro Pablo (El Capo), his wife Isabel Cristina, his lover Marcela, and four of his gang – his brother Nancho, Chemo, Perrys, and Tato – are hiding to escape the army. A cell phone brought in by Cristina receives a phone call, which is intercepted by a military spy plane, which is transmitted to a large military force encamped outside the bunker.

When the military discovers something very rare in the lake, they drop two bombs on the lake to scare the wildlife out of the area. The detonations also damage the bunker, causing it to be evacuated of all but Tato, who is injured and left behind. While El Capo and the rest move to a nearby farm, Tato is captured. When the group makes it to the city, Nancho persuades a terminally ill AIDS man, named El Moro, to drive a car bomb to the Senate in exchange for 200 million pesos for his family. Nancho fails to tell Juan Carlos, El Capo's son, about the bomb, so he is killed in the explosion. El Moro's children are rescued from the explosion by Perrys and Chemo, who pledge to take care of them. They then enlist a nurse and help Tato escape from the hospital prior to his being transported to jail.

El Capo has Juan Carlos' body stolen from the morgue, and brought to a series of caves they are hiding out in. An informer has given their location to the military, who follow them there. It is revealed that General Moncado and General Sarmiento, who were with the military, are actually allied with El Capo. They escape into the caves and join El Capo's men. The military attacks the caves and in the battle Chemo is killed. Moncada, Sarmiento and Perrys escape after the raid, with Perrys vowing to take care of El Moro's kids on her own. The military force is ramped up by the President, who is running for re-election.

El Capo and his band surrender, in order to protect the rest of his family. While in custody, several of the group are targeted for assassination, including Perrys and the nurse who helped Tato escape. When the President reneges on promises made to El Capo in exchange for his surrender, El Capo escapes with Nancho. In the ensuing chase, their car explodes, killing Nancho. Everyone also thinks that El Capo has died in the explosion. When she hears of his supposed death, El Capo's mother dies from grief. At her funeral the police arrest Isabel Cristina and Marcella, but Tato and Perrys escape. After their escape, Perrys does not want to go with Tato, preferring to leave their life of crime and focus on raising her children. El Capo and Tato escape in a stolen car.

== Cast ==
=== Main cast ===
Actor	Character	Season		
Actor	Character	1	2	3
Marlon Moreno	Pedro Pablo León Jaramillo	Main	Main	Main
Marcela Mar	Marcela Liévano	Main		
María Adelaida Puerta	Pilar Monroy "La Perrys"	Main	Main	
Katherine Vélez	Isabel Cristina	Main	Main	Main
Cristina Umaña	Bruna		Main	Main
Carolina Ramírez	Mariele		Main	
Óscar Borda	Osvaldo Tovar "Tato"	Recurring	Main	Main
Roberto Cano	El Burro		Main	
Daniel Lugo	Pacífico Blanco		Main	Recurring
Juan Carlos Vargas	Detective Velandia	Recurring	Main	Main
Natalia Jerez	Juliana León Marin	Recurring	Recurring	Main
Alfonso Herrera	Juan Vicente Blanco "Niño Malo"			Main
Michelle Manterola	Kyara			Main
Manuel Navarro	Jacob Bauman			Main
Juan Alfonso Baptista	Pitre			Main
Rubén Zamora	Braulio			Main
Marcelo Dos Santos	Terry Bianchini			Main
Alberto Pujol	Uriel Valenciano			Main

=== Recurring cast ===
Actor	Character	Season		
Actor	Character	1	2	3
Diego Trujillo	Guillermo Holguin	Recurring		
Manuel Sarmiento	Chemo	Recurring		
Elkin Díaz	Hernán León Jaramillo "Nancho"	Recurring		
Manuel José Chávez	Juan Pablo León Marín	Recurring		
María Cristina Pimiento	Alejandra Pineda	Recurring		
Florina Lemaitre	Ofelia	Recurring		
Felipe Calero	Felipe Holguin	Recurring		
Herbert King	Coronel Gaviria	Recurring		
Didier van der Hove	Pavel Asimov			Recurring
Guillermo Olarte	General Moncada	Recurring		
Ricardo Saldarriaga	General Sarmiento	Recurring		
Juan Sebastián Calero	Fiscal Armando Grisales	Recurring		
Héctor García	Aristobulo Vanegas "Federico Barón Correa"	Recurring		
Salvador del Solar	Rubén Castro		Recurring	
