= Vilaplana (disambiguation) =

Vilaplana is a municipality in the comarca of Baix Camp, Tarragona, Catalonia, Spain.

Vilaplana may also refer to:

== People ==
- Antonio Vilaplana Molina (1926–2010), Catholic bishop of the Diocese of León, Spain
- Bernat Vilaplana, Spanish film editor
- Lilo Vilaplana, Cuban director, screenwriter and teacher

== Others ==
- Casa Vilaplana, a building in Alcoy, Alicante, Valencian Community, Spain
