= La sustituta =

- Genre: Drama; Thriller
- Created by: Julio Jiménez; Iván Martínez
- Written by: Pedro Miguel Rozo
- Directed by: Rodrigo Lalinde; Lucho Sierra
- Starring: Majida Issa; Geraldine Zivic; Rami Herrera
- Theme music composer: Jose Fernández
- Country of origin: Colombia
- Original language: Spanish
- No. of seasons: 1
- No. of episodes: 51

Production
- Executive producer: Luis Eduardo Jiménez
- Producer: Juliana Valdivieso
- Editor: Silvia Ayala
- Production company: RCN Televisión

Original release
- Network: Vix
- Release: 28 June 2024

La sustituta is a Colombian telenovela created by Julio Jiménez and Iván Martínez. It is produced by RCN Televisión for TelevisaUnivision. The series stars Majida Issa and Geraldine Zivic. It premiered on Vix on 28 June 2024.

== Cast ==
=== Main ===
- Majida Issa as Eva Cortés
- Geraldine Zivic as Victoria de Urquijo
- Rami Herrera as Mabel Calderón
- Katherine Vélez
- Juan Fernando Sánchez
- Julián Román
- Josse Narváez
- Silvia De Dios
- Andrés Suárez
- Ernesto Benjumea
- Emilia Ceballos
- Angélica Legarda
- David Guerrero
- Jorge Monterrosa
- Carmenza Gómez
- Roberto Cano

=== Recurring and guest stars ===
- Susana Rojas
- Giovanni Gómez Almonacid
- María Clara Rodríguez Monsalve
- Jhon Lenis
- Damian Samper
- Camilo Pinzón

== Production ==
On 23 May 2023, it was announced that RCN Televisión had begun pre-production on La sustituta. It is produced for Vix, TelevisaUnivision's streaming service. Filming began on 12 July 2023.

== Episodes ==
| No. | Title | Original release date |
|---|---|---|
| 1 | "Estableciendo el juego" | 28 June 2024 |
| 2 | "Juego de resistencia" | 28 June 2024 |
| 3 | "El peso de los hombres" | 28 June 2024 |
| 4 | "Juego mental extremo" | 28 June 2024 |
| 5 | "Versiones diferentes" | 28 June 2024 |
| 6 | "Hallazgo bajo la lluvia" | 28 June 2024 |
| 7 | "Una fiesta amarga" | 28 June 2024 |
| 8 | "Sospechosa y amnésica" | 28 June 2024 |
| 9 | "La esposa de antaño" | 28 June 2024 |
| 10 | "El precio del silencio" | 28 June 2024 |
| 11 | "Detalles insignificantes" | 28 June 2024 |
| 12 | "Impostora" | 28 June 2024 |
| 13 | "Superando la culpa" | 28 June 2024 |
| 14 | "Pruebas contundentes" | 28 June 2024 |
| 15 | "Jaque" | 28 June 2024 |
| 16 | "Sangre pagada con sangre" | 28 June 2024 |
| 17 | "Suplantación" | 28 June 2024 |
| 18 | "Rompecabezas siniestro" | 28 June 2024 |
| 19 | "Corazón resquebrajado" | 28 June 2024 |
| 20 | "Brujas en el ático" | 28 June 2024 |
| 21 | "Tras el portón" | 28 June 2024 |
| 22 | "Secuestro siniestro" | 28 June 2024 |
| 23 | "Llamadas perversas" | 28 June 2024 |
| 24 | "Destierro laboral" | 28 June 2024 |
| 25 | "Seducción fallida" | 28 June 2024 |
| 26 | "Chantaje sin tregua" | 28 June 2024 |
| 27 | "Pasado con forma" | 28 June 2024 |
| 28 | "Identidad disociativa" | 28 June 2024 |
| 29 | "Retazos de locura" | 28 June 2024 |
| 30 | "Carne de cañón" | 28 June 2024 |
| 31 | "Muerte impertinente" | 28 June 2024 |
| 32 | "Nervios a flor de piel" | 28 June 2024 |
| 33 | "Saliendo del coma" | 28 June 2024 |
| 34 | "Visita inesperada" | 28 June 2024 |
| 35 | "Tiro de gracia" | 28 June 2024 |
| 36 | "Apóyame" | 28 June 2024 |
| 37 | "Enemistad" | 28 June 2024 |
| 38 | "Propuesta de matrimonio" | 28 June 2024 |
| 39 | "La caja de Pandora" | 28 June 2024 |
| 40 | "El demonio despertó" | 28 June 2024 |
| 41 | "Borrón y cuenta nueva" | 28 June 2024 |
| 42 | "Seducción consumada" | 28 June 2024 |
| 43 | "Intimidad y desconfianza" | 28 June 2024 |
| 44 | "Corazonada" | 28 June 2024 |
| 45 | "Veneno, la solución" | 28 June 2024 |
| 46 | "Un vídeo directo" | 28 June 2024 |
| 47 | "Recuperando el control" | 28 June 2024 |
| 48 | "Retazos de alto impacto" | 28 June 2024 |
| 49 | "Usurpación desmedida" | 28 June 2024 |
| 50 | "Fantasmas del pasado" | 28 June 2024 |
| 51 | "Al precipicio" | 28 June 2024 |

== Release ==
Internationally, the series premiered on Vix on 28 June 2024. In Colombia, the series aired on Canal RCN from 26 November 2025 to 9 January 2026, airing a total of 29 episodes.

== Awards and nominations ==
| Year | Award | Category | Nominated | Result | Ref |
|---|---|---|---|---|---|
| 2025 | India Catalina Awards | Best Telenovela | La sustituta | Won | |
| 2025 | India Catalina Awards | Best Directing | Rodrigo Lalinde & Luis Sierra | Nominated | |
| 2025 | India Catalina Awards | Best Screenplay | Julio Jiménez, Iván Martínez, Juan David Meza & Pedro Miguel Rozo | Nominated | |
| 2025 | India Catalina Awards | Best Supporting Actress | Katherine Vélez | Nominated | |
| 2025 | Produ Awards | Best Thriller Series | La sustituta | Nominated | |
| 2025 | Produ Awards | Best Psychological Drama Series | La sustituta | Nominated | |
| 2025 | Produ Awards | Best Lead Actress - Thriller Series | Majida Issa | Nominated | |
| 2025 | Produ Awards | Best Lead Actress - Psychological Drama Series | Majida Issa | Nominated | |
| 2025 | Produ Awards | Best Supporting Actor - Psychological Drama Series | Julián Román | Nominated | |
