= Eye for an Eye (2010 TV series) =

- Created by: Original story: Laura Restrepo; Adaptation and screenplay: Gustavo Bolivar
- Developed by: RTI Producciones by Telemundo Studios
- Directed by: Mario Mitrotti; Ramiro Meneses
- Starring: Gaby Espino; Miguel Varoni; Gregorio Pernía; Carmen Villalobos; Gonzalo Garcia Vivanco
- Theme music composer: Nicolas Uribe; Oliver Camargo; Jose Carlos Maria
- Opening theme: "Mi amor por ti" performed by Salvatore Casandro
- Country of origin: United States
- Original language: Spanish
- No. of episodes: 98

Production
- Executive producer: Hugo León Ferrer
- Producer: Jorge Sastoque Roa
- Production locations: Bogotá, Girardot, La Guajira
- Editor: Jose Luis Varon O.
- Camera setup: Multi-camera
- Running time: 42 minutes

Original release
- Network: Telemundo
- Release: December 14, 2010 – May 3, 2011

Related
- El clon; Los herederos del Monte

Eye for an Eye (Spanish: Ojo por ojo) is a Spanish-language telenovela to be produced by the United States–based television network Telemundo and RTI Colombia. From Gustavo Bolivar, the story is based on Laura Restrepo's novel, "El Leopardo al Sol" while borrowing some elements of William Shakespeare's Romeo and Juliet.

Telemundo was expected to air the serial from Monday to Friday over about 20 weeks. As with most of its other soap operas, the network broadcasts English subtitles as closed captions on CC3. However, and after very heavy promotional rotation, Telemundo opted for El Clon on the time slot originally allocated.

== Cast ==
| Actor | Character(s) |
|---|---|
| Gaby Espino | Alina Jericó de Monsalve |
| Miguel Varoni | Nando Barragán |
| Gregorio Pernía | Manny Monsalve |
| Carmen Villalobos | Nadia Monsalve |
| Gonzalo García Vivanco | Arcángel Barragan |
| Juan Carlos Vargas | Frepe Monsalve |
| Marcelo Cezán | Narciso Barragan |
| Óscar Priego | Hugo Monsalve |
| Ana Soler | Mona Barragán |
| Oscar Borda | Tin Puyua |
| Ramiro Meneses | Fernely |
| Sara Corrales | Karina Muñoz |
| Alberto Valdiri | Lic. Miguel Mendez |
| Claudia Moreno | Magdalena Barragán "La Muda" |
| Ines Oviedo | Milena Montes |
| Hector Garcia | Raca Barragan |
| Linda Baldrich | Lorena Vivas |
| Karina Laverde | Severina Barragán |
| Paula Barreto | Melba Foucon |
| Natalia Giraldo | Yomaira |
| Francisco Bolivar | Marcos Barragan |
| Lucy Colombia Arias | Roberta Caracola |
| Roberto Cano | Adriano Monsalve |
| Julio del Mar | Ito Monsalve |
| Julian Diaz | Cachumbos |
| Emerson Yañez | Simón Blaas |
| Jacob Isaza | Diablo |
| Martha Restrepo | Martha |
| Alejandra Lugo | Marcela |
| Carla Ramírez | Soledad Bracho |
| Jose Luis Paniagua | Maelo |
| Herbert King | Coronel Buitrago |
| Yeimy Ramirez | Perla |
| Nini Pabon | Monica |
| Valeria Chagui | María |
| Carmen Delgado | Doña Lupe |
| Ricardo Abarca | Gustavo |
| Graciela Doring | Doña Chavela |
