= Polvo carnavalero =

- Also known as: A Carnival Affair
- Genre: Telenovela
- Written by: Dago García
- Directed by: Juan Camilo Pinzón; Carlos Cook
- Starring: Rafael Zea; Johanna Cure; Beto Villa Jr.; Víctor Hugo Morant; Patricia Tamayo
- Opening theme: "Polvo carnavalero" by Beto Villa Jr.
- Country of origin: Colombia
- Original language: Spanish
- No. of episodes: 90

Production
- Producer: Dago García
- Production locations: Bogotá; Barranquilla
- Running time: 60 minutes
- Production company: Caracol Televisión

Original release
- Network: Caracol Televisión
- Release: January 10 – May 19, 2017

Related
- Cuando vivas conmigo; Los Morales

Polvo carnavalero (English title: A Carnival Affair) is a Colombian telenovela based on the 2016 film of the same title written by Dago García. It stars Rafael Zea, Johanna Cure, Beto Villa Jr., Víctor Hugo Morant, Sergio Borrero and Patricia Tamayo. It premiered on Caracol Televisión on January 10, 2017 and concluded on May 19, 2017.

== Cast ==
- Rafael Zea as Alejandro "Alejo" Mallarino Otero
- Johanna Cure as Elizabeth "Eli" Abuabara de Mallarino
- Isabela Córdoba as Laura Santamaría
- Beto Villa Jr. as Ramón de Jesús "Moncho" Abuabara
- Pedro Palacio as Bonifacio "Bony" del Cristo Martínez Botero
- Patricia Tamayo as Beatriz "Betty" Otero
- Stefany Escobar as Beatriz Otero (young)
- Nestor Alfonso Rojas - Teófilo "Teo" Martínez "Pelucavieja"
- Jaime Enrique Serrano as Teófilo "Teo" Martínez "Pelucavieja" (young)
- Víctor Hugo Morant as Julio Santamaría (owner of the Santamaría Clinic)
- Jennifer Steffens as Patricia "Paty" Pumarejo
- Emilia Ceballos as Lorna Martínez Botero
- Keri Bunkers as Linda Palma
- Luly Bossa as Lola "Loly" María Botero Pumarejo
- Rodrigo Castro as Gustavo Adolfo Gómez Mejía (psychologist)
- Martha Osorio as Bárbara Grimaldi Gómez
- Emerson Rodríguez as Dr. Fernando Bocanegra (doctor)
- Sergio Borrero as himself
- José Rojas as the doctor
- Alexandra Serrano as Emiliana
- Hugo Luis Urruchurto as Paragüita
- Francisco Rueda as Francisco "Pacho"
- Santiago Bejarano as Teófilo's lawyer
- Felipe Galofre as Ricardo Forero (timid employee of María José) #1
- Tuto Patiño as Ricardo Forero (timid employee of María José) #2
- Eileen Roca as Dr. Sol Prieto Paolo (psychologist)
- Claudia Martínez as Elizabeth's friend at the university
- Natalia Salazar as Margarita (secretary)
- María Claudia Torres as Simona Matamoros
- Julieth Arrieta as Alejo's client
- Marco Gómez as Felipe Godinez
- Bernardo García as Santiago Goyoneche
- Manuela Valdés Ruiz as Margarita Rueda "Marguie"
- Christophe de Geest as Mike
- Fernando Bocanegra as Martín
- Yipsy González as Julio's dance teacher
- Laura Lara as Carmenza (secretary)
- Kristina Lilley as Ester "Estersita"
- Margarita Amado as Pepa
- Andres Mejía as system engineer
- Juan Carlos Solarte as sergeant Trespalacios
- Valentina Lizcano as Deyanira / Renata Concepción Roncancio De los Arrayanes (secretary)
- Marcelo Castro as Toño (Alejandro's companion of spiritual retreat)
- Antonio Di Conza as Usmail
- Ricardo Vesga as Maestro Camilo
- Félix Mercado as Bonny's partner and the theater student of Goyoneche
- Walter Luengas as Virgilio (Renata's ex-wife)
- Jennifer Ochoa
- Patricia Castaño as Margarita's mother
- Gerardo Calero as Aristóteles Nepomuceno Urrutia
- Frank Solano as Domingo (presenter of Todos con la arenosa)
- Astrid Junguito as Concha "Conchita" (Aristóteles' friend)
- Álvaro García as the resident of La Abadía de los Santos
- Luis Miguel Hurtado as Abogado Roncancio
- Arnold Cantillo as Guillermo "Guillo"
- Freddy Ordóñez as María José's partner
- Juan Pablo Acosta
- Christian Gómez as priest
