= The Discreet Hero =

2013 novel by Mario Vargas Llosa

- Author: Mario Vargas Llosa
- Original title: El héroe discreto
- Language: Spanish
- Publisher: Alfaguara
- Publication date: 1 June 2013
- Publication place: Spain
- English publication date: 2015
- Pages: 383
- ISBN: 978-6-12309-107-1

The Discreet Hero (Spanish: El héroe discreto) is a 2013 novel by the Peruvian-Spanish writer Mario Vargas Llosa. It follows the interlaced intrigues of three Peruvians: the owner of a trucking business who refuses to pay protection money, the boss of an insurance company, who marries and goes away with his housekeeper, and an executive at the insurance company who is unjustly accused of a crime by his employer's sons. The book reuses several characters from previous stories by Vargas Llosa, notably In Praise of the Stepmother (1988) and The Notebooks of Don Rigoberto (1998).

The novel was the basis for the Colombian telenovela Cuando vivas conmigo which ran in 2016 and 2017.
