= Miguel Varoni =

Argentinian Colombian actor

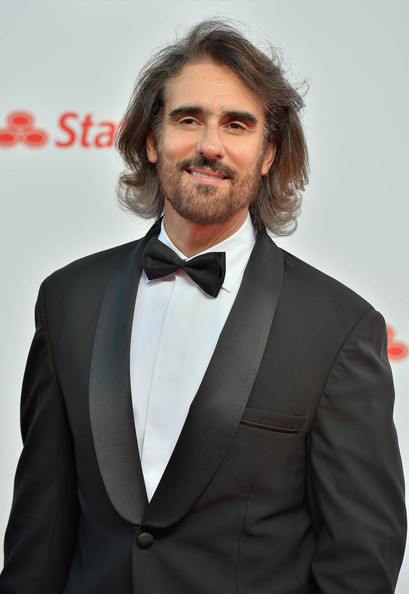
- Varoni in 2015
- Born: Miguel Américo Belloto Gutiérrez; 11 December 1964 (age 61); Buenos Aires, Argentina
- Occupations: Actor; director; host
- Years active: 1986–present
- Spouse: Catherine Siachoque (m. 1999)
- Mother: Teresa Gutiérrez
- Relatives: Majida Issa (niece)

Miguel Américo Belloto Gutiérrez (born 11 December 1964), known professionally as Miguel Varoni, is an Argentine Colombian actor, director, and producer. He is married to Colombian actress Catherine Siachoque. He is the son of the Colombian actress Teresa Gutiérrez.

== Filmography ==
=== Film ===
Year	Title	Role	Notes
2005	es:Mi abuelo, mi papá y yo	Eduardo	
2007	Ladrón que roba a ladrón	Emilio López	
2010	Sin tetas no hay paraíso	Dr. Mauricio Contento	
2010	Más sabe el diablo: El primer golpe	Martin Acero / El Hierro	Direct-to-DVD; prequel to novela

=== Television ===
Year	Title	Role	Notes
1986	Gallito Ramírez	Arturo Sanclemente	
1988	Garzas al amanecer	Chepe Robledo	
1992	Inseparables	José Miguel Valenzuela	
1993	La potra Zaina	Daniel Clemente	
1996	Te dejaré de amar	Evaristo Larios	
1997	Las Juanas	Manuel F. Cuadrado	
1998	La sombra del arco iris	Cristóbal Montenegro	
2000	La caponera	Dionisio Pinzón	
2001	Pedro el escamoso	Pedro Coral Tavera	Main role
2003	Como Pedro por su casa	Pedro Coral Tavera	Main role
2004	Te voy a enseñar a querer	Alejandro Méndez	Main role
2006	Lotería	Adrián	Episode: "Dos Evas para un Adan"
2006-2007	Seguro y urgente	Miguel Ángel Buenaventura	24 episodes
2007	My Name Is Earl	Javier	Episode: "Creative Writing"
2009	Victorinos	Martin Acero / El Hierro	
2009-2010	Más sabe el diablo	Martin Acero / El Hierro	Main role
2010	Ojo por ojo	Nando Barragán	Main role
2011-2012	La casa de al lado	Javier Ruiz	Main role; 163 episodes
2012-2013	Corazón valiente	Jesús Matamoros / El Mesiás	Main role
2013-2014	Marido en alquiler	José Salinas	
2015	Dueños del paraíso	Leandro Quezada	Main role; 52 episodes
2017	La Fan	Justin Case / El Director	Main role; 103 episodes
2017–2018	El Señor de los Cielos	Leandro Quezada	Main role
2024	Pedro el escamoso: más escamoso que nunca	Pedro Coral Tavera	Main role

== Production work ==
Year	Title	Credited as		Notes
Year	Title	Director	Producer	Notes
2018	El Señor de los Cielos	Yes	No	Season 6
2019	Jugar con fuego	No	Yes	
2019	Betty en NY	No	Yes	
2020	100 días para enamorarnos	No	Yes	
2021	La suerte de Loli	Yes	No	
2021	Malverde: El Santo Patrón	Yes	No	
2024	El Conde: Amor y honor	Yes	No	
2024	Sed de venganza	Yes	No	
2024	La mujer de mi vida	No	Yes	
2025	Velvet: El nuevo imperio	Yes	No	
