= Niños Ricos, Pobres Padres =

Colombian telenovela

- Created by: Luis Felipe Salamanca
- Developed by: Telemundo Studios, Miami; RTI Colombia
- Directed by: Rodolfo Hoyos; Santiago Vargas
- Starring: Carmen Villalobos; Margarita Muñoz; Aldemar Correa; Sebastián Caicedo; Fabiola Campomanes; Aylín Mújica
- Theme music composer: Miguel de Narváez
- Opening theme: Una Noche Más interpreted by Luis Campos
- Countries of origin: United States; Colombia
- Original language: Spanish
- No. of episodes: 131

Production
- Executive producer: Hugo León Ferrer
- Producer: Madeleine Contreras
- Production location: Bogotá, Colombia
- Editor: Mauricio Gonzalez L.
- Camera setup: Multi-camera
- Running time: 42 minutes

Original release
- Network: Telemundo
- Release: July 7, 2009 – January 8, 2010

Related
- El Rostro de Analía; Perro amor

Niños Ricos, Pobres Padres (GenerationY ) is a Colombian telenovela produced by the United States–based television network Telemundo. It debuted on July 7, 2009, at 9:30 p.m. Eastern Time, taking over the second half of El Rostro de Analía until Friday, July 17, when it completely replaced it in the 9–10 p.m. slot.

The story revolves around Alejandra Paz, a beautiful 17-year-old girl and her mother, Lucía, an undocumented US immigrant who is deported from Miami back to Bogotá, Colombia; desperate and broke, they are forced to move in with Lucía's hostile sister, Verónica. On the first day, Alejandra is invited to Isabela's party, Esteban's girlfriend. After putting a drug in Alejandra's drink, Alejandra is suddenly raped by Matías, Esteban's friend. Suddenly Alejandra and her mother are submerged into a world of intrigue and betrayal where money is no object and people are not who they seem to be. High school drama soon ensues as Esteban and David fight to win Alejandra's heart. While Esteban and Alejandra date, they are then separated by lies and betrayal made by Mónica and Isabela. Soon Isabela gets pregnant by Gabriel, Rocio and Martha's brother. Later, Isabela lies to Esteban that she is pregnant by him in order to separate him from Alejandra. Suddenly, David learns that he has the opportunity to be with Alejandra, while Alejandra can't forget Esteban and still loves him.

As with most of its other soap operas, the network broadcasts English subtitles as closed captions on CC3.

The number of episodes aired on Telemundo was 131 due to during first 2 weeks episodes were shortened to 20 minutes, since the 1-hour time slot was shared with El Rostro de Analía. The international version has 125 episodes.

== Cast ==
Main cast in order of appearance

Actor	Character	Known as
Carmen Villalobos	Alejandra Paz	Protagonist. Lucía's daughter, in love with Esteban and David, stays with David at the end.
Aldemar Correa	David Robledo	Berta and Rafael's son, Lola's brother, in love with Alejandra.
Margarita Muñoz	Isabella Domínguez	Principal villain, later good. Eduardo's daughter, pregnant by Gabriel, in love with him.
Sebastián Caicedo	Esteban San Miguel	Guillermo and Mónica's son, in love with Alejandra, commits suicide.
Fabiola Campomanes	Lucía Rios	Alejandra's mother, Veronica's sister, in love with Guillermo, killed by Mónica.
Javier Delguidice	Guillermo San Miguel	Mónica's ex-husband, Esteban's father, in love with Lucía.
Geraldine Zivic	Mónica San Miguel	Main villain. Guillermo's ex-wife, Esteban's mother, Verónica's friend, killed Lucía, ends up in prison.
Juan Pablo Shuk	Roberto de la Torre	Verónica's ex-husband, Santiago's father, in love with Martha.
Aylín Mújica	Veronica Rios	Villain. Lucía's sister, obsessed with Gabriel, Mónica's friend, Santiago's mother, ends up in insane asylum.
Gabriel Valenzuela	Gabriel Granados	Gardener of the school, Martha and Rocio's brother, in love with Isabela, Verónica's lover, father of Isabela's baby.
Didier van der Hove	Cesar Alarcón	Juan's father, Amelia's lover, politic.
Millie Ruperto	Berta Robledo	Rafael's wife, mother of David and Lola, cook of the school, in love with Mr. Donelly.
Paula Barreto	Dorotea Cortés	School counselor, in love with Mauricio.
Conrado Osorio	Eduardo Dominguez	Isabela's father, Karina's husband, Mónica's lover, in love with Aura.
Andrés Fierro	Diego Aguirre	Aura's son, Santiago's boyfriend.
Carlos Arturo Buelvas	Santiago de la Torre	Veronica and Roberto's son, Alejandra's cousin, Diego's boyfriend.
Tatiana Rentería	Aura Aguirre	Diego's mother.
Johanna Bahamón	Karina Suarez	Eduardo's future wife and Isabela's future step mom, hates Isabella at first.
Javier Jattin	Matías Quintana	Villain. Juan and Miguel's friend, raped Alejandra, ends up in prison.
Margarita Vega	Juliana Pardo	Isabella and Laura's friend, obsessed with older men especially Mauricio, David's ex-girlfriend, has cancer.
Alexander Rodriguez	Mauricio Huertas	School professor, in love with Dorotea.
Juan David Agudelo	Juan Alarcón	Cesar's son, Amelia's ex-boyfriend.
Mónica Pardo	Anaís Obregón	Alejandra's friend, in love with Santiago.
Alexander Gil	Arturo Duarte	Drug dealer, in love with Lola.
Alejandra Guzmán	Rocío Granados	In love with Manuel, Martha and Gabriel's sister.
Sebastian Eslava	Miguel Zabala	Schoolboy, likes Dorotea and Mónica, likes older women.
Juliana Gómez	María Dolores "Lola" Robledo	Rocio's friend, David's sister.
Majida Issa	Martha Granados	Used to be the maid of the De La Torres family, in love with Roberto, Gabriel and Rocio's sister.
Carlos Hurtado	Rafael Robledo	Berta's ex-husband, David and Lola's father, alcoholic, ends up in prison.
Alvaro Garcia	Thomas Donelly	School principal, in love with Berta.
Camilo Perdomo	Manuel de la Rosa Cervantes	Jorge's son, in love with Rocio.
Maleja Restrepo	Amelia Richards	Lover of Esteban, Juan, Arturo, and Cesar.
Marcelo Cezan	Jorge Cervantes	Manuel's father, drug traficant, died.
Angela Vergara	Vanessa Vergara	Jorge's lawyer, Manuel's tutor and guardian, in love with Jorge.

== Broadcasting ==
Country	TV network(s)	Series premiere	Series end	Time slot
United States	Telemundo	July 7, 2009	January 8, 2010	21:00
Armenia	TheShantTv	July 21, 2010	September 8, 2010	
Macedonia	SitelTV	December 8, 2009	June 9, 2010	
Hungary	Fem3	April 12, 2010	October 11, 2010	
Romania	AcasaTv	June 7, 2010	October 16, 2010	
Serbia	1PRVA	September 20, 2010	March 21, 2011	08:10 - 00:00
Poland	Polonia 1 Novela TV	September 12, 2011; August 9, 2012; April 1, 2013	March 27, 2012; February 7, 2013; October 12, 2013	21:00; 22.00; 22.00
Slovenia	TV3	September 20, 2011	February 29, 2012	
Slovakia	TV Doma	April 30, 2012; July 28, 2014	November 2, 2012; November 12, 2014	15:10; 06:15
Bulgaria	bTV	June 11, 2012	December 13, 2012	11:00, from 12.09 at 16:00
Bulgaria	bTV Lady	February 2, 2013	June 2, 2013	10:00 - 14:00
