= Carmen Villalobos =

Colombian actress (born 1983)

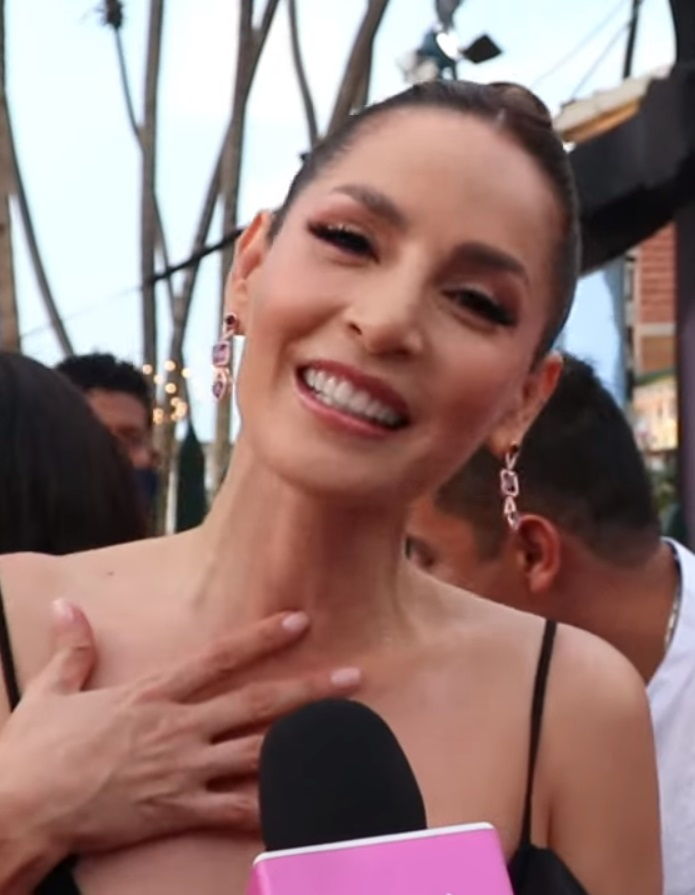
- Villalobos in 2022
- Born: Yorley del Carmen Villalobos Barrios; 13 July 1983 (age 43); Barranquilla, Atlantico, Colombia
- Occupation: Actress
- Years active: 1999–present
- Spouse: Sebastián Caicedo (m. 2019; div. 2022)

Carmen Villalobos (born Yorley del Carmen Villalobos Barrios on July 13, 1983) is a Colombian actress and model.

== Career ==
She is best known for her character Catalina Santana in the telenovela Sin senos no hay paraíso based on the book by Gustavo Bolívar titled Sin tetas no hay paraíso. She won another major role in the Telemundo series, El Señor de los Cielos, where she played Leonor Ballesteros. She was also known as Alejandra Paz in the Telemundo novela, Niños Ricos, Pobres Padres. She recently re-personified Catalina Santana in the telenovela Sin senos sí hay paraíso, based on Bolivar's new book titled Sin tetas si hay paraíso, in the first season of the series only had a special participation as flashback and cameos. In the second season she was promoted as titular character of the series.

== Personal life ==
She was married to Sebastián Caicedo. She is now single.

== Filmography ==
Film roles
Year	Title	Roles	Notes
2018	El fantasma de mi novia	Lupe del Mar	

Television roles
Year	Title	Roles	Notes
1999	Club 10	Abi	
2003	Amor a la plancha	Ernestina "Nina" Pulido	
2004	Dora, la celadora	Catalina Urdaneta	
2005–2006	La Tormenta	Trinidad "Trini" Ayala Camacho	Series regular; 216 episodes
2006	Amores de mercado	Beatriz "Betty" Gutiérrez	Series regular; 123 episodes
2008–2009	Sin senos no hay paraíso	Catalina Santana	Main role; 167 episodes
2009–2010	Niños Ricos, Pobres Padres	Alejandra Paz Ríos	Main role; 131 episodes
2010	Ojo por ojo	Nadia Monsalve Jericó	Series regular; 98 episodes
2011	Mi corazón insiste en Lola Volcán	María Dolores "Lola" Volcán	Main role; 133 episodes
2012	Made in Cartagena	Flora María Díaz	Main role; 63 episodes
2013–2015	El Señor de los Cielos	Leonor "Leo" Ballesteros Mireles	Recurring role (season 1); main role (seasons 2–3); 232 episodes
2016–present	Sin senos sí hay paraíso	Catalina Santana / Virginia Fernández de Sanín	Guest role (season 1); main role (seasons 2–3); 177 episodes
2019	El final del paraíso	Catalina Santana / Virginia Fernández	Main role (season 4); 82 episodes
2021	Café con aroma de mujer	Lucía Sanclemente	Series regular; 92 episodes
2022	Hasta que la plata nos separe	Alejandra Maldonado	Main role; 88 episodes
2022–present	Top Chef VIP	Herself	Host

== Awards and nominations ==
Year	Award	Category	Works	Result
2012	Your World Awards	The Perfect Couple (with Jencarlos Canela)	Mi corazón insiste en Lola Volcán	Nominated
2012	Your World Awards	The Best Kiss (with Jencarlos Canela)	Mi corazón insiste en Lola Volcán	Nominated
2013	Premios People en Español	Best Supporting Actress	El Señor de los Cielos	Nominated
2014	Your World Awards	Favorite Lead Actress	El Señor de los Cielos	Nominated
2015	Your World Awards	Favorite Lead Actress: Series	El Señor de los Cielos	Nominated
2015	Your World Awards	The Perfect Couple (with Rafael Amaya)	El Señor de los Cielos	Nominated
2016	Miami Life Awards	Best Female Lead in a Telenovela	El Señor de los Cielos	Nominated
2017	Your World Awards	I'm Sexy and I know it	Sin senos sí hay paraíso	Won
