= List of Pa' quererte episodes =

The following is a list of episodes of the Colombian telenovela Pa' quererte, which premiered on 20 January 2020 on RCN Televisión and ended its first season on 23 March 2020 due to the COVID-19 pandemic in Colombia. On 12 January 2021, the new episodes were resumed with the broadcast of a second season.

== Series overview ==
Season	Episodes	Originally released	
Season	Episodes	First released	Last released
1	56	7 January 2020	20 March 2020
2	81	12 January 2021	7 May 2021

== Episodes ==
=== Season 1 (2020) ===
No. overall	No. in season	Title	Original release date	Colombia viewers (Rating points)
1	1	"Mauricio conoce a Isabel"	7 January 2020	6.6
2	2	"Los empleados de Mauricio se enteran de que es papá"	7 January 2020	9.5
3	3	"Jorge le aconseja a Mauricio que se haga la prueba de ADN"	8 January 2020	8.2
4	4	"Mauricio e Isabel se hacen la prueba de ADN"	8 January 2020	10.1
5	5	"Mauricio recibe una mala noticia"	9 January 2020	9.6
6	6	"Mauricio es capturado"	10 January 2020	9.2
7	7	"Mauricio recoge los resultados de la prueba de ADN"	13 January 2020	11.1
8	8	"Dany pierde la beca"	14 January 2020	11.8
9	9	"Nueva oportunidad para Mauricio"	15 January 2020	11.4
10	10	"Jorge descubre que Catalina le es infiel"	16 January 2020	10.7
11	11	"Lorenzo se va del país"	17 January 2020	11.0
12	12	"Dany busca trabajo"	20 January 2020	11.9
13	13	"Dany se disculpa con su mamá"	21 January 2020	11.0
14	14	"Mauricio se lleva una sorpresa"	22 January 2020	11.1
15	15	"Dany descubre la verdad"	23 January 2020	11.9
16	16	"Isabel entra a su nuevo colegio"	24 January 2020	11.7
17	17	"Isabel escapa de la casa"	27 January 2020	10.7
18	18	"Los amigos de Mauricio se unen para buscar a Isabel"	28 January 2020	11.8
19	19	"Octavio se muda con Jorge"	29 January 2020	12.3
20	20	"Toño amenaza a Pablo"	30 January 2020	10.7
21	21	"Mauricio recibe una nueva oferta"	31 January 2020	11.5
22	22	"Mauricio no puede pasar la noche con Lizeth"	3 February 2020	10.7
23	23	"Lizeth se devuelve a su país"	4 February 2020	12.5
24	24	"Mauricio y Dany son asaltados"	5 February 2020	12.1
25	25	"Noche de serenata"	6 February 2020	11.3
26	26	"Incertidumbre por un beso"	7 February 2020	11.5
27	27	"Mauricio trabaja con Octavio"	10 February 2020	11.8
28	28	"El cumpleaños de Isabel"	11 February 2020	10.9
29	29	"Mauricio es aconsejado por sus amigos"	12 February 2020	12.3
30	30	"Catalina regresa con su familia"	13 February 2020	11.7
31	31	"Dany le cuenta la verdad a Lorenzo"	14 February 2020	11.3
32	32	"Verónica retira su propuesta"	17 February 2020	11.2
33	33	"Dany toma una decisión"	18 February 2020	11.6
34	34	"Dany recibe una propuesta del exterior"	19 February 2020	12.1
35	35	"Verónica cree que lo mejor es divorciarse"	20 February 2020	11.6
36	36	"Mauricio y Dany hablan con Consuelo de su relación"	21 February 2020	10.9
37	37	"Dany se despide de Consuelo"	24 February 2020	12.2
38	38	"Isabel se entera de la muerte de Consuelo"	25 February 2020	11.7
39	39	"Toño acompaña a Jorge en su decepción amorosa"	26 February 2020	11.2
40	40	"Lorenzo vuelve para intentar recuperar a Dany"	27 February 2020	11.7
41	41	"Juliana se hace la prueba de embarazo"	28 February 2020	11.0
42	42	"Juliana les cuenta a sus papás que está embarazada"	2 March 2020	11.1
43	43	"Dany toma una decisión"	3 March 2020	11.2
44	44	"Isa de la relación de Dany y Mauricio"	4 March 2020	11.4
45	45	"Isabel se escapa del colegio"	5 March 2020	11.4
46	46	"Isa es trasladada de urgencia a la clínica"	6 March 2020	10.9
47	47	"Mauricio busca la forma de que no le quiten a Isabel"	9 March 2020	12.9
48	48	"Mauricio se viste de payaso"	10 March 2020	11.6
49	49	"Dany y Mauricio dan rienda suelta a su amor"	11 March 2020	12.7
50	50	"Isabel y Mauricio van a terapia"	12 March 2020	11.3
51	51	"Dany consigue trabajo como modelo de ropa interior"	13 March 2020	12.6
52	52	"Catalina quiere recuperar a Jorge"	16 March 2020	10.3
53	53	"Dany perdona a Isabel"	17 March 2020	12.2
54	54	"Mauricio no aparece"	18 March 2020	12.2
55	55	"Jorge viaja a Medellín a buscar a Mauricio"	19 March 2020	11.8
56	56	"Mauricio está inconsciente en un hospital"	20 March 2020	12.3

=== Season 2 (2021) ===
No. overall	No. in season	Title	Original release date	Colombia viewers (Rating points)
57	1	"A Mauricio le cambia la vida en un abrir y cerrar de ojos"	12 January 2021	8.6
57	1	"Verónica toma una decisión definitiva"	12 January 2021	8.6
58	2	"Dany se entera que Miranda regresó a la vida de Mauricio"	13 January 2021	7.8
58	2	"Lorenzo regresa a Colombia"	13 January 2021	7.8
59	3	"El emotivo reencuentro de Dany y Mauricio"	14 January 2021	6.6
60	4	"Azucena y Octavio se enteran de una impactante noticia"	15 January 2021	7.3
61	5	"Toño golpea fuertemente a Jorge"	18 January 2021	6.7
62	6	"El negocio de Lorenzo que beneficiará a más de uno"	19 January 2021	7.3
63	7	"El reclamo que Mauricio le hace a Lorenzo"	20 January 2021	6.5
64	8	"Los celos comienzan a hacer estragos en la relación de Dany y Mauricio"	21 January 2021	6.8
65	9	"Mauricio aclara su situación con Miranda"	22 January 2021	6.3
66	10	"Toño sorprende a Verónica con una drástica decisión"	25 January 2021	6.5
67	11	"Dany le prepara una gran sorpresa a Mauricio"	26 January 2021	6.1
68	12	"Miranda arruina el romántico momento entre Dany y Mauricio"	27 January 2021	6.6
69	13	"Tatiana y Jerónimo encuentran a Toño en una angustiante situación"	28 January 2021	6.4
70	14	"Dany le hace un fuerte reclamo a Miranda"	29 January 2021	6.3
71	15	"Mauricio defiende a Dany delante de Isabel"	1 February 2021	6.8
72	16	"Mauricio golpea fuertemente a Lorenzo"	2 February 2021	5.7
73	17	"Toño recibe una inquietante llamada"	3 February 2021	7.9
74	18	"La familia Perdomo enfrenta un doloroso momento"	4 February 2021	8.5
75	19	"Dany toma una decisión con respecto a su relación con Mauricio"	5 February 2021	8.1
76	20	"Miranda les hace una propuesta a Mauricio y a Isa"	8 February 2021	7.5
77	21	"El emotivo momento en el que Isa y Mauricio se despiden de Dany"	9 February 2021	7.5
78	22	"Lorenzo y sus socios se encuentran en graves problemas"	10 February 2021	7.1
79	23	"Miranda le pide una oportunidad a Mauricio"	11 February 2021	7.8
80	24	"Mauricio e Isa emprenden una nueva aventura"	12 February 2021	6.7
81	25	"Dany encuentra a Mauricio y a Miranda juntos"	15 February 2021	8.3
82	26	"Mauricio va a buscar a Dany a su casa"	16 February 2021	7.8
83	27	"Un nuevo logro en la vida de Mauricio"	17 February 2021	7.9
84	28	"Lorenzo le da una gran sorpresa a Dany"	18 February 2021	7.3
85	29	"Mauricio recibe una dolorosa noticia"	19 February 2021	7.6
86	30	"Una conmovedora despedida"	22 February 2021	8.5
87	31	"Lorenzo le es infiel a Dany con Miranda"	23 February 2021	7.7
88	32	"Dany sorprende a Lorenzo con una decisión"	24 February 2021	8.3
89	33	"Lorenzo se ve metido en problemas"	25 February 2021	8.0
90	34	"Mauricio se encuentra con una gran sorpresa"	26 February 2021	7.9
91	35	"Lorenzo preocupa a Miranda con una noticia"	1 March 2021	8.0
92	36	"Mauricio nota una actitud rara en Miranda"	2 March 2021	8.2
93	37	"Milagros descubre a Elvira y a Julián juntos"	3 March 2021	8.3
94	38	"Mauricio sorprende a Isa con una importante decisión"	4 March 2021	8.6
95	39	"La gran preocupación de Miranda y Lorenzo"	5 March 2021	7.6
96	40	"Isa se reencuentra con su mamá"	8 March 2021	8.2
97	41	"Dany se afecta al enterarse de una noticia de Miranda y Mauricio"	9 March 2021	8.4
98	42	"Dany le cuenta a Mauricio sobre el embarazo de Miranda"	10 March 2021	8.8
99	43	"Lorenzo le hace un fuerte reclamo a Miranda"	11 March 2021	8.4
100	44	"Antes de la boda, Mauricio se lleva a Dany"	12 March 2021	8.9
101	45	"Dany y Lorenzo dan el "sí" en el altar"	15 March 2021	9.2
102	46	"María tiene una fuerte discusión con Mauricio"	16 March 2021	8.1
103	47	"María toma una decisión que afectará a Isa y a Mauricio"	17 March 2021	8.1
104	48	"La emotiva despedida de Dany y Mauricio"	18 March 2021	8.2
105	49	"La promesa que Mauricio le hace a Isa"	19 March 2021	7.5
106	50	"Miranda le confiesa a Mauricio que le fue infiel"	23 March 2021	8.0
107	51	"Dany se comunica con Octavio y le da una angustiante noticia"	24 March 2021	8.9
108	52	"Catalina vuelve a Colombia"	25 March 2021	8.3
109	53	"Dany regresa a Colombia y se entera de una noticia"	26 March 2021	7.6
110	54	"Catalina se entrega a las autoridades"	29 March 2021	8.1
111	55	"Mauricio e Isa aparecen"	30 March 2021	7.2
112	56	"Mauricio se reecuentra con Dany"	31 March 2021	8.3
113	57	"Mauricio hará todo lo posible para que Isa no salga del país"	5 April 2021	7.9
114	58	"Mauricio recibe una triste noticia"	6 April 2021	8.9
115	59	"La propuesta que Dany le hace a Mauricio"	7 April 2021	8.2
116	60	"Lola sorprende a Jorge con una confesión"	8 April 2021	8.5
117	61	"Miranda le pide perdón a Dany"	9 April 2021	9.2
118	62	"Lorenzo regresa a Colombia"	12 April 2021	9.6
119	63	"Mauricio da inicio a un importante desfile"	13 April 2021	8.8
120	64	"Lorenzo le confiesa a Dany que le fue infiel"	14 April 2021	9.0
121	65	"Dany toma la decisión de ponerle fin a su matrimonio"	15 April 2021	8.5
122	66	"Lorenzo le revela a Mauricio la gran verdad de Dany"	16 April 2021	9.0
123	67	"Isa le pide a Mauricio que se de otra oportunidad con Dany"	19 April 2021	9.1
124	68	"Dany y Mauricio le dan una grata noticia a sus amigos"	20 April 2021	8.7
125	69	"Dany decide perseguir sus sueños y le da una noticia a Mauricio"	21 April 2021	8.8
126	70	"Dany y Mauricio vuelven a estar juntos y viven un apasionado momento"	22 April 2021	8.2
127	71	"Dany recibe una noticia que le cambiará la vida"	23 April 2021	8.7
128	72	"Dany le hace una dolorosa confesión a Mauricio"	26 April 2021	8.7
129	73	"Mauricio se reencuentra con Isa"	27 April 2021	8.4
130	74	"Isa llama a Dany y le hace una confesión sobre Mauricio"	28 April 2021	9.3
131	75	"María sorprende a Mauricio con una noticia poco agradable"	29 April 2021	8.4
132	76	"Dany le cuenta la verdad a Mauricio sobre su embarazo"	30 April 2021	9.3
133	77	"Mauricio le dice a Dany que se hará cargo de su hijo"	3 May 2021	8.3
134	78	"Mauricio toma una decisión definitiva"	4 May 2021	9.0
135	79	"Dany comienza a sentir fuertes contracciones"	5 May 2021	10.3
136	80	"La vida de Mauricio toma un giro inesperado"	6 May 2021	9.3
137	81	"Dany sorprende a Mauricio con amoroso reencuentro"	7 May 2021	10.1
