= Teresa Gutiérrez =

Colombian actress (1928–2010)

- Born: 25 October 1928; Bogotá, Colombia
- Died: 9 March 2010 (aged 81); Bogotá, Colombia
- Occupation: Actress
- Years active: 1942–2009
- Spouses: Alberto Granados; Americo Bellotto
- Children: Miguel Varoni; María Margarita Giraldo Gutiérrez
- Relatives: Majida Issa (granddaughter)

Teresa Gutiérrez (25 October 1928 – 9 March 2010) was a Colombian actress best known for her roles in TV series. Since the genesis of the television broadcasting in Colombia in (1954) she has appeared in numerous series, including Seguro y urgente, Te voy a enseñar a querer, Los Victorinos and Como Pedro por su casa. She played La Marquesa Carmen Santillana de la Roquette in Telemundo's Zorro: La Espada y la Rosa.

Gutiérrez was the mother of actor Miguel Varoni and actress María Margarita Giraldo Gutiérrez and she was a grandmother of Majida Issa.

== Early life ==
She was born in Bogotá, Colombia. She began her acting career through her father Carlos Gutierrez Riaño, as he was the artistic director of the radio station Nueva Granada. "Well my dad, Carlos Gutierrez Riaño, and I were testing a microphone. I was 14 years old. I took it and said 'This is the station Nueva Granada, Bogota, Colombia, South America.' Then he said, on Monday you start working with me."

== Filmography ==
=== Film ===
Year	Title	Role	Notes
1987	El niño y el Papa		
1988	Un hombre y una mujer con suerte		
2006	Dios los junta y ellos se separan	Doña Jesusa	
2007	Satanás	Blanca, Eliseo's mother	
2007	Los Andes no creen en Dios	Juana	
2007	Muertos del susto	Doña Herminea	

=== Television ===
Year	Title	Role	Notes
1972	La perla		
1975	Antón García		
1976	En la trampa		
1976	Recordarás mi nombre		
1977	Un largo camino	La bruja Nemesia	
1978	La marquesa de Yolombó		
1978-1979	La abuela	Brigida de Paredes	120 episodes
1982	El hijo de Ruth		3 episodes
1984-1985	Los cuervos	Sara Olmedo	105 episodes
1985	Tuyo es mi corazón		
1985	Los impostores		
1987	Lola calamidades		120 episodes
1988	El segundo enemigo		
1989	Calamar		
1991	Por qué mataron a Betty si era tan buena muchacha		165 episodes
1991	Sangre de lobos		120 episodes
1992	Una mujer con suerte		
1993	La maldición del paraíso		3 episodes
1994	Señora Isabel	Julia Emma de Dominguez	
1995	Leche		
1996	Candela	Juana Montes	3 episodes
1997	Prisioneros del amor	Cecilia Sáenz de la Peña	3 episodes
1997	Juliana, qué mala eres!	Teresa	
1998	La madre	Lola	118 episodes
1999	Un Mundo para Julius	Julia	
1999	La guerra de las Rosas	Pachita	3 episodes
2001	El Inútil	Doña Lucy	
2001	Pedro el escamoso	Pastora de Gaitán	
2002	Maria Madrugada	Doña Herta	
2002	Pecados Capitales	Doris	162 episodes
2004	Dora, la celadora	Antonia De Urdaneta	122 episodes
2005	Los Reyes	Doña Flor	
2007	Zorro: La Espada y la Rosa	La Marquesa Carmen Santillana de la Roquette	
2009	Victorinos	Aurora	
* Antela Consagration Award for Best Actress

=== Radio drama ===
- El derecho de nacer
