= Pedro el escamoso =

- Title card
- Genre: Telenovela; Comedy drama
- Written by: Luis Felipe Salamanca; Dago García
- Directed by: Juan Carlos Villamizar
- Starring: Miguel Varoni; Sandra Reyes; Javier Gómez; Marcela Mar
- Narrated by: Miguel Varoni
- Opening theme: "La Hormiguita" by Juan Luis Guerra
- Ending theme: "La Hormiguita" by Juan Luis Guerra
- Country of origin: Colombia
- Original language: Spanish
- No. of episodes: 327

Production
- Executive producer: Juan Andrés Flores
- Producers: Luis Felipe Salamanca; Dago García
- Production company: Caracol Televisión

Original release
- Network: Caracol Televisión
- Release: 19 April 2001 – 23 February 2003

Related
- Yo amo a Juan Querendón; Pedro el escamoso: más escamoso que nunca

Pedro el Escamoso is a Colombian telenovela created by Luis Felipe Salamanca and Dago García, that aired on Caracol Televisión from 2001 to 2003.

The telenovela follows Pedro, a tacky and overly confident but charming macho man who comes from a small town in Colombia. Fleeing a problem with "skirts," Pedro moves to the capital (Bogotá) to find his fortune and encounters a series of events and people that change his life dramatically. Pedro is the epitome of a man who can get all the women he wants, but can't get the one he loves. "Escamoso," a Colombian colloquialism for someone who thinks he's "all that".

== Plot ==
The story of Pedro Coral Tavera (Miguel Varoni) is funny, heartwarming and heartbreaking all at the same time. He is not the typical gallant protagonist; he is not rich, he is not handsome, he does not dress well, he thinks he is a good dancer.

Upon arriving in the city, Pedro Coral meets Paula Dávila (Sandra Reyes) and develops feelings for her. Within a short period, he becomes her driver and confidant. He also takes on a role in supporting the Pacheco family, which consists of three women who are grieving the recent loss of their husband and father. As Pedro becomes more involved in their lives, he encounters new personal and family circumstances that shape his experiences in the city.

He creates his own universe, full of big lies, but with good intentions. And, in the end, this recalcitrant seducer ends up being the key person in the life of every human being who crosses his path, spreading joy, kindness and friendship with his 'smile from ear to ear' and his particular way of dressing, speaking and moving.

== Cast ==
=== Main ===
- Miguel Varoni as Pedro Coral Tavera
- Javier Gómez as César Luis Freydell
- Sandra Reyes as Paula Davila
- Aura Helena Prada as Mónica Ferreira
- Jairo Camargo as Alirio Alberto Perafán Rocha de Francisco
- Álvaro Bayona as Pastor Fernando Gaitán García
- Alina Lozano as Nidia Estela Pataquiva Viuda de Pacheco
- Martha Osorio as Ana Dávila Serna
- Marcela Mar as Mayerli del Carmen Pacheco Pataquiva
- Andrea Guzmán as Yadira del Pilar Pacheco Pataquiva
- Juan Carlos Arango as Enrique Bueno Lindo
- Fernando Solórzano as René Martín Lara
- Inés Oviedo as Lydia Sánchez #1
- Bibiana Navas as Lydia Sánchez #2

=== Recurring ===
- Adriana Osorio as Marina Medina, César and Mónica's maid
- Carlos Kajú as Pedrito Coral Jr., Pedro's son
- Diego Ramos as Sandro Billycich, Freydell's new boss
- Enrique Carriazo as Lorenzo De la Espriella, Pedrito Jr.'s teacher
- Fernando Arévalo as Gustavo "El Pote" Angarita García, Pastor Gaitán's half-brother
- Paola Charry as Laura Vélez, Monica's cousin and Pedro's crush
- Sofia Silva as Cristina García Méndez, Pedrito Jr.'s friend
- Wilson Rangel as Julio Gutiérrez, Perafán's best friend

=== Guest stars ===
- Alexander Palacios as Doctor
- Alexandra Restrepo as Marlen Chavéz, Aldemar's daughter who is in love with Pedro
- Amparo Conde as Delfina Pataquiva, Nidia Pacheco's cousin
- Andrés Huertas Motta as Andrés Huertas, Priest friend of César Luis
- Cristian Gómez as Alberto Gómez, former Commercial Vice President of Industrias Freydell and accessory to the embezzlement at Industrias Freydell.
- Héctor Rivas as Aldemar Chavez, Marlen's father
- Manolo Cardona as El Paisa, Pedro's friend and countryman
- Manuel Pachón as Doctor Pablo, Monica's doctor
- Maurizio Konde as Commander Garcia, Chief of Police Parks
- Luis Fernando Múnera as Juan Pacheco, Pacheco and Paula's father
- Julio César Luna as Hugo Horacio Billycich, Sandro's father
- Manolo Orjuela as Carlos "Carlangas", Pedro's friend in San Pablo
- Yesenia Valencia as Pedrito's teacher in San Pablo
- Carlos Hurtado as Professor Guillermo Castro, Inocencia's husband and Yadira's lover
- Luis Eduardo Motoa as Gustavo Martínez, Monica's husband in Miami
- Orlando Valenzuela as Sigifredo Chavéz, Heriberto and Marlen's brother
- Liliana Escobar as Inocencia Sabogal, night school teacher
- Andrés Felipe Martínez as Alberto, debt collector
- Juan Carlos Pérez Almanza as Angarita's employee
- Morella Zuleta as Shirley Lorena Pelaez "Miss Finlandia"
- Astrid Junguito as Pepita De la Espriella, Lorenzo's wife
- Herbert King as Heriberto Chavéz, Sigifredo and Marlen's brother
- Nadia Rowinsky as Susana Recoba, Mangosteen trader
- John Ceballos as Albeiro, Laura's ex-boyfriend
- Johanna Trujillo as Paulina, Heriberto's ex-wife and Pedro's fictitious girlfriend
- Teresa Gutiérrez as Pastora García De Gaitán, Pastor and Gustavo's mother
- Rodolfo Silva as Freydell Attorney
- Karlos Granada as Don Braulio
- Anny Cadena as herself
- Catalina Jaimes as herself
- Hernán Orjuela Buenaventura as himself
- Galy Galiano as himself
- Lorena Zuleta as herself
- Los Visconti as themselves
- Luisa Bejarano as herself
- Marlon Restrepo as himself
- Mauricio Arango as himself
- Mónica Londoño as herself
- Pedro Luis Falla as himself
- Rafael Barrera as himself
- Ramón Trujillo as himself
- Rolando Patarroyo as himself

== Awards and nominations ==
=== TVyNovelas Awards ===
Year	Category	Nominated	Result
2002	Best Telenovela	Pedro el Escamoso	Winner
2002	Best Favorite Leading Actor	Miguel Varoni	Winner
2002	Best Favorite Leading Actress	Sandra Reyes	Nominated
2002	Best Favorite Supporting Actress	Alina Lozano	Winner
2002	Best Favorite Supporting Actress	Andrea Guzman	Nominated
2002	Best Favorite Supporting Actor	Álvaro Bayona	Winner
2002	Best Favorite Supporting Actor	Jairo Camargo	Nominated
2002	Best Favorite Antagonistic Actor	Javier Gómez	Winner
2002	Best Libretist	Dago García	Winner
2002	Best Director	Juan Carlos Villamizar	Winner

=== India Catalina Awards ===
Year	Category	Nominated	Result
2002	Best Telenovela	Pedro el Escamoso	Winner
2002	Best Leading Actor	Miguel Varoni	Winner
2002	Best Leading Actress	Sandra Reyes	Nominated
2002	Best Supporting Actress	Alina Lozano	Winner
2002	Best Supporting Actor	Álvaro Bayona	Nominated
2002	Best Script	Dago García	Winner
2002	Best Director	Juan Carlos Villamizar	Nominated

=== Caracol awards ===
- Best Telenovela
- Best Leading Actor: Miguel Varoni
- Best Leading Actress: Sandra Reyes
- Best Supporting Actress: Alina Lozano
- Best Supporting Actor: Jairo Camargo

=== Other awards ===
- INTE Awards Best Actor Miguel Varoni
- Association of Latin Entertainment Critics ACE: Personality of the Year Miguel Varoni
- Two Gold in Venezuela: Best Foreign Actor Miguel Varoni
- Gold Star in Venezuela: Miguel Varoni
- Great eagle in Venezuela: Best Foreign Actor Miguel Varoni
- Mara Gold in Venezuela: Best Foreign Actor Miguel Varoni
- Orchid in USA: Best Actor Miguel Varoni
- Orchid in USA: Best Co-Star Actress Alina Lozano
- Orchid in USA: Best Co-Star Actor Jairo Camargo

== Sequels and spin-offs ==
=== Como Pedro por su casa ===
After the telenovela was concluded in 2003, Telemundo produced a spin-off titled Como Pedro por su casa, Miguel Varoni reprised his role as Pedro, alongside Ana de la Reguera, Alina Lozano, Álvaro Bayona, Fernando Solórzano, Jairo Camargo and Juan Carlos Arango.

=== Pedro el escamoso: más escamoso que nunca ===
In October 2023, it was announced that Caracol Televisión had ordered a sequel series. The series, titled Pedro el escamoso: más escamoso que nunca, premiered on 16 July 2024.

== International remakes ==
- In 2003, the Portuguese network TVI produced a version titled Coração Malandro, starring Pepê Rapazote.
- In 2007, the Mexican network Televisa produced a version titled Yo amo a Juan Querendón, starring Eduardo Santamarina.
- The French network France 3 produced a version, titled Le Sens de Jean-Louis.
