= Los Reyes (TV series) =

Colombian television series

Los Reyes (The Reyes) is a telenovela filmed in Colombia and produced by the Colombian network, RCN (Radio Cadena Nacional - "National Radio Network"). It debuted in 2005 and is available via RCN cable TV in the United States.

== Plot ==
Los Reyes is about a working-class family and Edilberto "Beto" Reyes, the head of the family, who suddenly gets hired as president of a multinational company. This happens when he stops the former president of the company, a middle-aged woman with a terminal disease, from committing suicide. Beto shows the woman his daily life and his people, helping her get back on her feet. The president is grateful, and goes to France to get a treatment for her disease. When she leaves, she thanks Beto by giving him the presidency of the company.

The vice president, Emilio Iriarte (wrongly called "Urinarte"), who sought the company's presidency after the former president disappeared, and his family swear to take revenge. They focus on making the Reyes family go back "where they belong", but problems arise when Emilio falls in love with Laisa, Beto's 'sister'. Laisa conducts a television show on which famous real-life celebrities appear. 354 chapters.

== Other information ==
This comedy parodies high society and its treatment of the lower classes. There has been controversy about one character, Laisa Reyes, who is in the series and in real-life a transsexual. Reyes is well received by Colombian audiences.

== Cast and crew ==
=== Cast ===
- Enrique Carriazo as Edilberto "Beto" Reyes
- Jacqueline Arenal as Mayoli "Yoli" Gonzalez
- Geraldine Zivic as Natalia Bernal
- Diego Trujillo as Emilio Iriarte De Las Casas
- Endry Cardeño as Laisa Reyes
- Julián Román as Leonardo Giovanny "Leo" Reyes
- Margarita Muñoz as Maria del Pilar "Pilarica" Valenzuela
- Daniel Arenas as Santiago "Santi" Iriarte
- Constanza Camelo as Hilda Edilberta Reyes
- Janeth Wallman as Katty Vanegas de Iriarte
- Ricardo Vélez as Armando Valenzuela
- Rosita Alonso as Mercedes Rubio
- Jery Sandoval as Maria del Carmen Reyes
- Henry Montealegre as Andres "Totoy" Reyes
- Tiberio Cruz as Edgar Galindo
- Jenny Vargas as Alegrina
- Diego Vélez as Eliseo "Cheo" Varona
- Catherine Mira as Maritza Galindo
- Alberto León Jaramillo as Hernán Cifuentes
- Nataly Umaña as Mónica
- Juan Camilo Hernández as Mateo Santos
- Jairo Camargo as Psychologist Simón Rodríguez
- Katty Rangel as Lolita
- Orlando Valenzuela as Martín Castro Novo
- William Marquez as Ernesto 'Chiqui' Peralta
- Bianca Arango as herself
- Teresa Gutiérrez as Doña Flor
- Marisela González as Maria Eugenia Reyes
- Carmenza Gonzalez as Dulcinea
- Óscar Dueñas as Jorge
- Chela Del Río as Doña Rosita
- Sebastián Caicedo as Francisco Guerrero
- Alfonso Ortíz as Eduardo Pinzón
- Beatríz Roldan as Maria Fernanda "Mafe"
- Valentina Cabrera Lemaitre as Annie
- Vicky Rueda as Adriana Malaber
- Thana Carvajal as Luz Dary
- David Ramírez López as Henrry
- Lucas Velázquez as hinself

==== Guest stars ====
- Raúl Santi as himself
- Lucas Arnau as himself
- Maia as herself
- Jose Gaviria as himself
- Gali Galeano as himself
- Pirry as himself
- Helenita Vargas as herself
- Mauricio Chicho Serna as himself

== Laisa's show guests ==
La Gata is an interview show created by Laisa within the series, these are the current guest stars.

- La Ley
- Ricardo Montaner
- Diego Ramos
- Pirry

== See also ==
- List of Colombian TV Shows
