= Sebastián Caicedo =

Colombian actor

- Born: Juan Sebastián Caicedo Londoño; November 12, 1980 (age 45); Cali, Colombia
- Occupation: Actor
- Years active: 2004-present
- Spouse: Carmen Villalobos (m. 2019–2022)

Sebastián Caicedo (Born as Juan Sebastián Caicedo Londoño on November 12, 1980 in Cali, Colombia), is a Colombian television actor. He has participated in several telenovelas which also featured his ex-wife, Carmen Villalobos.

In 2017, he won a Nickelodeon Kids' Choice Awards blimp in the Trendy Guy category.

== Filmography ==
Television roles
Year	Title	Roles	Notes
2004	Todos quieren con Marilyn	Carlos Alberto "Beto" Camacho	
2005	El baile de la vida	Román Zambrano	Main role; 169 episodes
2005	Los Reyes	Francisco Guerrero	
2006	Amores cruzados	Ramón Márquez García	
2007	Nadie es eterno en el mundo	Tyson Bernal	
2008	Sin senos no hay paraíso	David	
2008	La quiero a morir	Camilo Mondragón	
2009	Niños ricos, pobres padres	Esteban San Miguel	Main role; 131 episodes
2011	Los Canarios	Rodrigo Vidal	
2013	La hipocondríaca	Javier	
2013	Mentiras perfectas	Iván Perea	
2014–2016	El Señor de los Cielos	Eleazar Yepes / El Tostado Yepes	Recurring role (seasons 2–4); 109 episodes
2015	La esquina del diablo	Cristo Rodríguez	
2015	Anónima	Camilo	
2016	El tesoro	Manuel Otero	
2017	El Chema	El Tostado Yepes / Eleazar Yepes	Recurring role (season 1); 45 episodes
2017	Las Malcriadas	Jaime Rosales	
2020	Decisiones: Unos ganan, otros pierden	José Valdivieso	Episode: "Tiquete One Way"
2023	Los 50	Himself	Contestant
