= Todos quieren con Marilyn =

Colombian telenovela

- Genre: Telenovela
- Created by: Juan Carlos Perez Florez
- Written by: Johanna Gutiérrez; Claudia Liliana García; Lina Uribe
- Directed by: Israel Sánchez; Pepe Sánchez
- Creative director: Rosario Lozano
- Starring: Scarlet Ortiz; Jorge Reyes
- Music by: Josefina Severino
- Opening theme: "Todos quieren conmigo" by Yolanda Rayo
- Country of origin: Colombia
- Original language: Spanish
- No. of episodes: 126

Production
- Executive producers: Adriana Suárez; María del Pilar Fernández
- Producer: Javier Alvarado
- Cinematography: Sergio García
- Editor: María Vásquez
- Camera setup: Multi-camera

Original release
- Network: RCN Televisión
- Release: April 14, 2004 – June 7, 2005

Todos quieren con Marilyn is a Colombian telenovela original by Juan Carlos Perez Florez and produced by RCN Televisión. It stars Scarlet Ortiz as the titular character.

== Cast ==
=== Main ===
- Scarlet Ortiz as Marilyn
- Jorge Reyes as Juan Ignacio Camacho
- Cristina Umaña as Lorenza Pachón
- Alejandro López as Federico "Kiko" Arbeláez
- Marcela Mar as Johana / Brigitte
- César Mora as Benito
- Diego Trujillo as Gabriel Camacho

=== Recurring ===
- Ana María Kámper as Piedad de Pachón
- Sandra Hernández as Gladys / Íngrid
- Andrés Suárez as Chucky
- Gerardo Calero as Enrique Pachón
- John Ceballos as Joaquín "Joaco"
- Mariangélica Duque as María Fernanda "Nani" Franco
- Patricia Polanco as Clemencia de Camacho
- Gustavo Ángel as Simón / Moncho
- Rafael Novoa as Rafael Ruiz Restrepo
- Ernesto Benjumea as David Londoño
- Toto Vega as Fredy Polanía
- Karem Escobar as Lady Estefany
- Sara Corrales as Catalina Osorio
- María Angélica Duque as María Fernanda "Nani" Franco
- Christian Ruiz as Benson Caicedo
- Sebastián Caicedo as Carlos Alberto "Beto" Camacho
- Indhira Serrano as Onix
- Marcela Posada as Yolanda
- Juan Miguel Marín as Tyson Corchuelo
- Nicolás Reyes as Tobías Rómulo Salcedo
- Helena Mallarino as Dora Stella "Greta" Orjuela
