= Geraldine Zivic =

Argentine-born Colombian actress

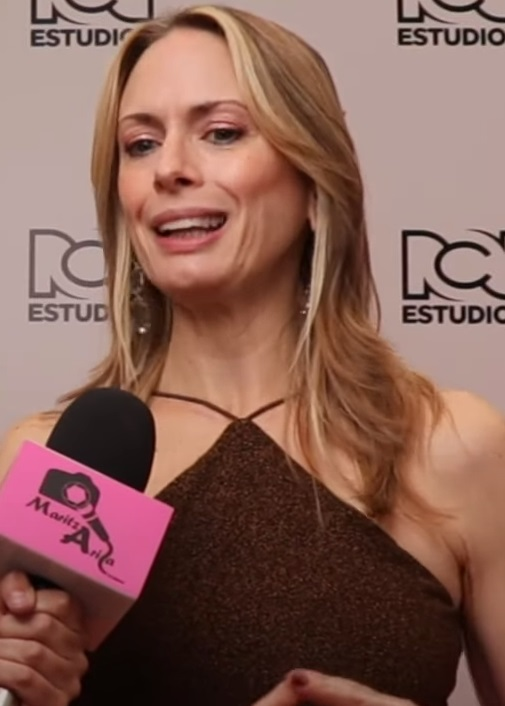
- Geraldine Zivic in 2023
- Born: December 7, 1975 (age 50); Buenos Aires, Argentina
- Occupation: Actress
- Website: http://www.geraldinezivic.tv

Géraldine Zivic (born December 7, 1975, in Buenos Aires, Argentina) is an Argentine-born Colombian award-winning actress, model and television host of Serb descent best known for her roles in telenovelas.

== Biography ==
At 15 years old, she moved to Colombia and still lives there today. Her mother is Argentine, her father is Serb who with his family moved to Argentina in 1943. She played a part of the kind-hearted and sweet Christina in Telemundo's El Clon, unlike her portrayal of Monica in the previous Telemundo teen series, Niños Ricos, Pobres Padres where her character was a Villain. Her latest appearance was in Telemundo's Flor Salvaje where she played La Mina, an Argentinian prostitute.

== Telenovela ==
- La sustituta as Victoria de Urquijo (2024)
- ¿Quién mató a Patricia Soler? as Patricia Soler (2015)
- Flor Salvaje as Mina (2011)
- El Clon as Cristina Miranda (2010)
- Niños Ricos, Pobres Padres as Mónica San Miguel (2009)
- El último matrimonio feliz as Catalina (2008–2009)
- Aquí no hay quien viva as Bea (2008–2009)
- Una anomalía perfecta as Karen (2008)
- Sin retorno(La deuda) as Laura (2007)
- Sin retorno as Patricia (2007)
- Tiempo Final as Florencia (2007)
- Mujeres Asesinas as Nelly (2007)
- Mujeres Asesinas as Ana María (2007)
- Amas de Casa Desesperadas as Lina Yepes (2006–2007)
- Los Reyes as Natalia (2005)
- La Costeña y El Cachaco as María Elvira (2003)
- La Lectora as Jazmín (2003)
- Punto de Giro as Brenda (2003)
- Pasiones Secretas as Teresa (2003)
- La sombrea del Arco Iris as Isabel (1999)
- La Mujer en el espejo as Mariana (1997)
- Otra en mi as Liliana Castillo / Valentina Uribe Mondragon (1996)
- Leche as Deboradora (1996)
- Eternamente Manuela as Laura (1995)
- Montaña Rusa (TV series) as Yamile (1994)

== Movie ==
- Ilona Llega Con La Lluvia Reparto - Dirigida por Sergio Cabrera

== TV Host ==
- Presentadora Concurso ELITE MODELS 1998 Producido por Canal A
- Panorama 1995 Producido por JES
- Gente Corrida 1994 Productor Hernán Orjuela

== Model ==
- Oscar De La Renta
- Silvia Tcherassi
- Pinel
- Touche
- Postobón
- Jabón Carey
- Samsung
- Productos Familia
- Kia Automóviles

== Awards ==
- Nominación al premio MEDIA ESPAÑA: Mejor Actriz protagonista. Otra en mí. 1997
- Premio TV y Novelas, como protagonista por Otra en mí. 1998
- Nominada PREMIOS ACPE como mejor actriz protagonista Otra en mí. 1998
- Nominada PREMIO SIMÓN BOLÍVAR como mejor actriz protagonista Otra en mí. 1999
- Premio Mara de Oro de Venezuela, como Mejor Actriz Antagónica por: La costeña y el cachaco. 2004
- Jurado de los Emmy Awards 2009 en la categoría de mejor actriz
- Nominada para los premios en Telemundo como mejor Antagónica-Villana en Niños Ricos Pobres Padres con el papel de Mónica San Miguel (2009)
