= El último matrimonio feliz =

Colombian telenovela

- Genre: Telenovela
- Created by: Adriana Suarez & Pedro Rozo
- Country of origin: Colombia
- No. of episodes: 240

Production
- Executive producer: Silvana Orlandelli
- Production locations: Bogotá, Cartagena and Melgar, Tolima
- Running time: 20-25 minutes
- Production company: RCN Televisión

Original release
- Network: RCN Televisión
- Release: January 21, 2008 – April 22, 2009

El Ultimo Matrimonio Feliz is a Colombian telenovela aired since 21 January 2008 on Colombian network RCN. It has a unique format among the current aired telenovelas in Colombia because of its ensemble cast. The telenovela is in top three of the most viewed shows in Colombia on the first half of 2008 season.

== Story ==
The program follows the story of the lives of five women who are undergoing different kinds of marital crises.

The first one to be introduced is Antonia Palacios, a beautiful middle-aged woman: the best saleswoman in Colombian real state company Grupo Inmobiliario, she is overloaded with work by her boss Manuel Gomez (Jorge Cao), a proud, avaricious and rich company manager with few scruples. The situation leads her to neglect her relationship with her husband Patricio and their teen daughter, Adelaida. After Adelaida is run over by a car, pretty much because Antonia had no time to pick her up, Antonia decides to establish her own company, En Casa, whose organization would allow women to work without forcing them to give up their family lives. Antonia and Manuel's middle-aged secretary, Margot Alvarez, also joins Antonia's company, meaning to escape Manuel's slavedriver work methods, meanwhile dealing with singlehandedly supporting her teenage children, Cesar David and Jenny. Margot's husband Armando, a taxi driver, feels that his love for her has died and leaves her for a younger woman, despite their precarious economical situation.

Antonia tells her hairdresser that she is hiring for her new company, and there she meets Barbara Mantilla (Valerie Dominguez). Barbara is desperate to find a job to gain economic independence and thus escape her abusive husband, Jesus, and her mother-in-law, Matilde. Due to Jesus' dependence on his mother, they have been forced to live with her for years: Matilde believes Barbara is undeserving of her son's affection, conducting covert smear campaigns against the young woman so that Jesus will eventually leave her (like indirectly affirming that Barbara's choice in clothing means that she is displaying herself for other men), most often resulting in Jesus believing his mother and beating Barbara viciously so that she will 'learn'. At the same time, Jesus is extremely (and possessively) attached to Barbara and cannot conceive losing her, leading to his seeking her forgiveness after each beating. This cycle has repeated itself over and over for years, making Barbara incapable of studying, holding a job or even leaving the house without somehow exciting a violent outburst of jealousy from her husband. Despite Barbara having no experience in real estate, Antonia decides to hire her.

The next couple to be introduced are Paulina and Carlos, a pair of newlyweds that have bought the last apartment Antonia sold while working for Grupo Inmobiliario. Both of them are highly successful businesspeople working at the same company, and are both in the race for a very important promotion: whoever gets the promotion will go on to control most of the company's functions, while the other will be fired. Paulina thinks very highly of herself and her abilities, and is thoroughly convinced she will win: this makes the shock of learning that Carlos has been promoted instead quite serious. Despite having promised each other to be graceful losers/winners in either case, Paulina first becomes hysterically angry. Unable to live down the disappointment, she goes on to accuse Carlos of stealing the promotion and further tampering with her career, causing the couple to distance, with talk of divorce beginning between them. When Paulina learns that Antonia is hiring for her new company, she offers her services as an accountant and saleswoman. Antonia, of course, hires her.

Meanwhile, Manuel cannot bear the loss of his best saleswoman: he believes that Antonia has betrayed him, first by leaving and then by establishing a company that poses a direct threat to his. Emilio hates Antonia because she is successful and a winner, while he is just a shadow of Manuel and a very poor salesman. Manuel knows Emilio is not a good person but since he knows his dirtiest secret he does not dare touching him. Manuel's dirtiest secret is that his wife Camila is not coming from a rich family, but a small town and that she is the daughter of a hooker, who sold her to Manuel while she was still a minor. Camila is always disrespected by Manuel and her son, Sebastian, who is exactly like his father. Camila seems to be an accessory for Manuel, when he goes to parties and events, and she is not even allowed to study to finish her high school.

Emilio also tricks Yorley, a low income woman who works as a maid, and her husband Mario by buying their house at a lower price. Yorley initially thinks Antonia is the real responsible for the deceiving, and she even insults her, but when Yorley realizes that Emilio was the real liar, she apologizes with Antonia, who hires her for the morning shift in "En Casa" as a maid, while keeping a job at Harold's business as a maid too.

Antonia completes her staff with two workers to fix the houses: Alcides and Wilmer. Alcides is a nice handsome man who hides her real sexual orientation to everybody else, while Wilmer is a chauvinistic man who thinks that men rule.

Later Antonia is diagnosed with breast cancer, but since her breast is an important part of the sexual game with her husband, she decides not to tell Patricio the truth, this attitude starts to fracture their marriage. Patricio starts a friendship with Barbara, who thinks he is the perfect man, this makes Barbara's husband really jealous and she is hit and raped by him. Barbara ultimately decides to leave her husband and alert the police so he can not approach her.

Mario leaves Yorley to work in a mine far away, this fractures their relationship more when Antonia's friend and client Bernardo Torres starts to feel love for Yorley and her reaction is the same, Yorley's daughter Olivia does not agree with this relationship and she does not fake her hate for Torres, this hate is exacerbated by a guy who attempted to rape Olivia who tells him her parents will not be together again.

Camila can not bear her situation with Manuel so she leaves him and reunites with her brother Faber and her niece, Camila is helped by Patricio's friend Esther Pimiento, a family lawyer, who starts the divorce not only for Camila, but for Barbara and Paulina.

The situation between Manuel and Antonia gets worse when their children Sebastian and Adelaida start a relationship. Alcides falls for Harold who has been used by Daniel just to get money from him. The situation gets more complicated when Angela, Harold's assistant, falls for Alcides ignoring he is gay.

== Reception ==
Despite the previous promotional campaign for the telenovela not being as strong as previous telenovelas in its time slot as Fernando Gaitan's Hasta que la Plata nos Separe ('Til Money Do Us Apart), Pura Sangre (Pure Blood) or the newest RCN telenovela Novia Para Dos (A Girlfriend for Two Men) it reached quickly a high position in the most watched TV shows in Colombia keeping the audience from its leading Pura Sangre.

El Último Matrimonio Feliz (The Last Happy Marriage) is actually one of the most watched TV shows on RCN network. From its premier on 21 January 2008 to 26 March 2008 it was the second most watched TV show in Colombia just behind its leading: dramatic and suspense telenovela Pura Sangre (Pure Blood). After Pura Sangre's finale, El Último Matrimonio Feliz fell to the third position on most watched TV shows in Colombia, but instead became the most watched TV show on RCN prime time.

El Último Matrimonio Feliz' new leading Novia Para Dos (A Girlfriend for Two Men) has not reached the high ratings Pura Sangre had and the competitor channel's Caracol TV strategy splitting its most successful telenovela in years in two parts placing another telenovela between the two parts has led to El Último Matrimonio Feliz to lose its original position on most watched TV shows in Colombia.

Nevertheless, the reinforcement of the prime time schedule in RCN network in the first half of May 2008 with action-policial procedure-oriented telenovela Los Protegidos (The Protected) has made all the telenovelas in RCN network including El Último Matrimonio Feliz to get the highest positions in a role, so El Último Matrimonio Feliz usually is getting the first, second or third place in the top of most watched shows in Colombia.

The characters have been accepted extraordinarily well by the audience, because of its relatable thematic and the high grade of identification between the public and the characters. The quality of the story based on Colombian women's issues got a much better reception than adapted version of Desperate Housewives (Amas de Casas Desesperadas) previously broadcast on the same time slot.

== Rating ==
June 2008 #2

May 2008 #2

February 2008 #2

== Schedule ==
Since August 2008 this is the current schedule in RCN prime time, El Último Matrimonio Feliz is aired Monday/Friday at 9:50 p.m.

== Cast ==
- Alejandra Borrero as Antonia Palacio
- Ricardo Velez as Patricio González
- Valerie Dominguez Tarud as Bárbara Mantilla
- Elkin Diaz as Jesus Espinosa
- Carmenza Gomez as Margot Alvarez
- Diego Velez as Armando Salgar
- Coraima Torres as Camila Andrade
- Jorge Cao as Manuel Gomez
- Yuly Ferrera as Yorley Zuñiga
- Kike Mendoza as Mario Herrera
- Cristina Campuzano as Paulina Florez
- Juan Pablo Espinosa as Carlos Garcia
- Biassini Segura as Cesar Salgar
- Fabio Rubiano as Emilio Angel
- Marianella Quintero as Jenny Salgar
- Jose Luis Paniagua as Harold Peralta
- Juan David Galindo as Alcides Niño León
- Cecilia Navia as Angela Murcia
- Marlon Moreno as Bernardo Torres
- Jairo Ordóñez as Plinio Buriticá
- Catherine Mira as Mireya León
- Estefanía Borge as Chantal
- Alina Lozano as Esther Pimiento
- Juan Manuel Gonzales as Sebastian Gomez
- Carlos Hurtado as Wimer Moya "Mogolla"
- David Galindo as Alcides Niño
- Gloria Gomez as Matilde Lozano
- Marcelo Dos Santos as Andrés Salamanca
- Felipe Calero as Daniel
- Gerardo Calero as Gabriel Sánchez
- María Isabel Bernal as Olivia Herrera
- Lina Balbuena as Adelaida Gonzáles
- Bianca Arango as Jessica
- Astrid Junguito as Elvia Fonseca
- Juan Pablo Raba as Alejandro Pizarro
- Ricardo Saldarriaga as Rafael
- Natasha Klauss as Marcela
- Geraldine Zivic as Catalina Lafourie
- Alejandra Azcárate as Margarita Ortíz
- Marco Antonio López as Matías Niño
- Juan Pablo Barragán as Paco
- Rodolfo Silva as Benito
- Rodrigo Candamil as Felipe de Soto
- Saín Castro as Sergio
- Eileen Moreno as Young Camila

== Portuguese spin-off ==
In 2014, the Portuguese channel "TVI – Televisão Independente" (Independent Television) premiered on 2 February a new series named "Mulheres" (Women), that follows the lives of 6 women who are all unhappy, there are also other differences in the story; one of them is that Mariana (one of the women) has cancer...
