= Sara Corrales =

Colombian television actress and singer

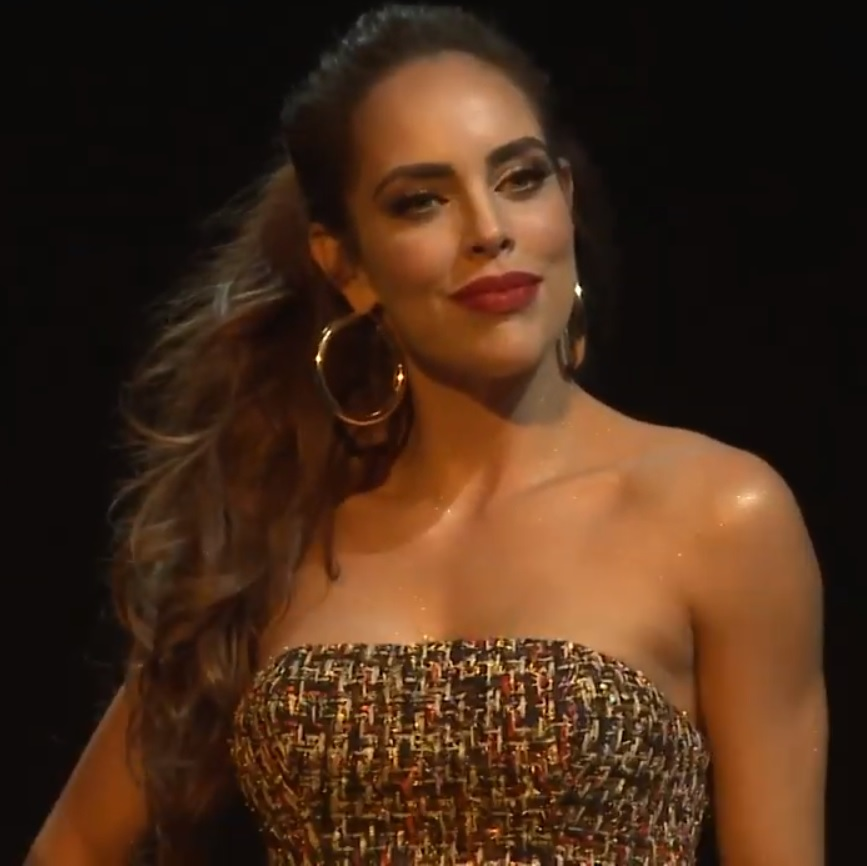
- Corrales in 2018
- Born: 27 December 1985 (age 40); Medellín, Antioquia, Colombia
- Occupations: Actress, singer
- Years active: 2003–present

Sara Corrales (born 27 December 1985) is a Colombian television actress and singer. She appeared in the 2004 telenovela Todos quieren con Marilyn as Catalina Osorio, a role which won her the TV y Novelas award to the revelation of the year, the 2008 telenovela Vecinos, where she played the evil Jessica, which also earned her a nomination for the favorite villain on the TV y Novelas award in 2009 and El Señor de los Cielos (2013).

== Filmography ==
Television roles
Year	Title	Role	Notes
2004	Todos quieren con Marilyn	Catalina Osorio	
2006	Merlina mujer divina	Yuri "Paloma" Paz	
2006	En los tacones de Eva	Angélica	
2007	La marca del deseo	María Claridad	
2008	Vecinos	Jessica Antonieta Morales	Recurring role; 129 episodes
2009	Victorinos	Victorina Fernández	
2010	El Clon	Karla Pérez	
2010	Ojo por ojo	Karina	
2010	El Secretario	Lucila Janet Castillo	
2013–2014	El Señor de los Cielos	Matilde Rojas	Recurring role (seasons 1–2); 130 episodes
2015	El capitán Camacho	Lina Marcela Durán	
2016–2017	Despertar contigo	Cindy Reyna	Main cast; 122 episodes
2016	Vuelve temprano	Denisse Moya	Recurring role; 48 episodes
2017	La doble vida de Estela Carrillo	Real Estela Carillo	Recurring role; 14 episodes
2018	Mi marido tiene más familia	Herself	Episode: "Imelda descubre que Canuto está en Oaxaca"
2019	Cita a ciegas	Ingrid Ortega	Main cast
2020–2021	Quererlo todo	Sabina Curiel	Main cast
2022	El último rey	Patricia Rivera	Recurring role
2022–2023	Mi camino es amarte	Úrsula Hernández	Main cast
2025	La Jefa	Laura Rojas	
