= Metástasis =

Colombian Spanish-language version of Breaking Bad

- Promotional image
- Genre: Crime drama Telenovela
- Based on: Breaking Bad by Vince Gilligan
- Directed by: Andi Baiz; Andrés Biermann
- Starring: Diego Trujillo; Roberto Urbina; Sandra Reyes; Julián Arango
- Country of origin: Colombia
- Original language: Spanish
- No. of seasons: 5
- No. of episodes: 62

Production
- Production locations: Bogotá, Colombia and surroundings
- Production companies: Sony Pictures Television; Teleset

Original release
- Network: UniMás; Caracol Television
- Release: June 8 – September 18, 2014

Related
- Breaking Bad

Metástasis is a Colombian telenovela series, a Spanish language remake of the American crime drama Breaking Bad that transposes the events of the original from the United States to Colombia. It follows the storyline for all five seasons of Breaking Bad, with alterations to its pacing, visual style, and subplot elements.

All five series were shown between June 8 and September 18, 2014; for a total of 62 episodes. It has been broadcast in Chile, Venezuela, Peru, the United States, Costa Rica and Mexico, among other countries, by Fox Latin America.

== Plot ==
Walter Blanco is a frustrated high school chemistry teacher, married to his unexpectedly-pregnant wife Cielo Blanco, and father of his son Walter Blanco Jr who has cerebral palsy. Walter also works in a car wash in the afternoons. When he is diagnosed with terminal lung cancer, he wonders what will happen to his family when he dies.

Witnessing a raid by the Anti-Narcotics Police organized by his brother-in-law Henry Navarro, Walter recognizes a former student of his: José Miguel Rosas, whom he contacts to manufacture and sell methamphetamine and thus ensure the economic well-being of his family. But the approach to the world of drugs and dealing with traffickers and mobsters contaminates Walter's mind, making him gradually abandon his straight and predictable personality to become someone without too many scruples when it comes to getting what he wants.

== Production ==
The idea for a Spanish remake of Breaking Bad was originally conceived due to how cable television is not common in Latin America. The episodes were individually shot in an average of two and a half days, compared to eight for its American counterpart.

Some changes were made to adapt aspects of Breaking Bad's American elements to Metástasis' Colombian setting. The outdoor scenes of Metástasis were shot in Bogotá, which has a colder and more mountainous environment compared to the deserts surrounding Albuquerque, New Mexico. Pest exterminators are uncommon in the region, so the main characters pose as demolition experts in the latter half of the fifth season. Saúl Bueno (the show's equivalent of Saul Goodman) demonstrates his legal services on a television talk show rather than through commercials, as legal services cannot be advertised in Colombia. The iconic recreational vehicle which Jesse and Walter use to cook meth is replaced by a school bus, as RVs are rare in Latin America.

== Cast ==
- Diego Trujillo – Walter Blanco
- Roberto Urbina – José Miguel Rosas
- Sandra Reyes – Cielo Blanco
- Julián Arango – Henry Navarro
- Luis Eduardo Arango – Saúl Bueno
- Diego Garzón – Walter Blanco Jr.
- Manuel Gómez – Gustavo Cortéz
- Frank Ramírez – Héctor Salamanca
- Damián Alcázar – Tuco Salamanca
- Edgardo Román - Mario Arboleda

== Distribution ==
In Mexico, Televisa's Channel 5 broadcast the series Monday through Friday at midnight; in the United States, the series aired on UniMás, with a debut simulcast on UniMás, Univision, and Galavisión on Sunday, June 8, 2014.

== Series overview ==
Overview of seasons of Metástasis
Season	Episodes	Originally aired	
Season	Episodes	First aired	Last aired
1	7	June 8, 2014	June 18, 2014
2	13	June 23, 2014	July 9, 2014
3	13	July 10, 2014	July 27, 2014
4	13	July 28, 2014	August 19, 2014
5	16	August 20, 2014	September 18, 2014

== Reception ==
Vince Gilligan, the creator of Breaking Bad, praised Metástasis' creators for being able to create the original series' entire runtime much faster and on a smaller budget.

Awards and nominations for Metástasis
Year	Award	Category	Nominee	Result
2016	India Catalina Awards	Best antagonistic actor of telenovela or series	Frank Ramirez	Won
2016	TvyNovelas Awards	Best Supporting Actor in a Series	Julian Arango	Nominated
2016	TvyNovelas Awards	Best Supporting Actor in a Series	Diego Garzón	Nominated
