= Pa' quererte =

Colombian telenovela

- Genre: Telenovela
- Created by: Juan Andrés Granados
- Based on: Papá a toda madre by Montserrat Gómez García
- Written by: Various (Note: In addition to Juan Andrés Granados, the series is adapted for television by: Jorgel Elkim Ospina, Juan Carlos Troncoso, Liliana Guzmán, Fernán Rivera, Ana Fernández Martínez and Paola Arias; original story Pedro Armando Rodríguez, Alejandra Romero, Humberto Robles, and Héctor Valdés)
- Directed by: Israel Sánchez; Catalina Hernández
- Creative director: Ana Paula Zamudio
- Country of origin: Colombia
- Original language: Spanish
- No. of seasons: 2
- No. of episodes: 137 (list of episodes)

Production
- Executive producer: Yalile Giordanelli

Original release
- Network: RCN Televisión
- Release: 7 January 2020 – 7 May 2021

Related
- Pa' quererte en casa; Pa' seguirte queriendo

Pa' quererte is a Colombian telenovela produced and distributed by RCN Televisión that premiered on RCN Televisión on 7 January 2020. The series is an adaptation of the Mexican telenovela Papá a toda madre broadcast on Las Estrellas in 2018. It stars an ensemble cast headed by Sebastián Martínez, Laura de León, Luis Eduardo Arango, and Diana Wiswell. The plot revolves around 4 friends of different ages football fans who have a small team, in addition to this the 4 are non-conventional parents who will have to assume their role as parents. It will air Monday to Friday at 8:00 p.m., replacing El man es Germán.

Due to the COVID-19 pandemic in Colombia, RCN Televisión temporarily suspended the telenovela, broadcasting the last episode on 20 March 2020. This, because production has not ended, and quarantine has been decreed. New episodes resumed on 12 January 2021.

== Cast ==
=== Main ===
- Sebastián Martínez as Mauricio Reina
- Juliette Pardau as Daniela "Dany" Daza
- Hanny Viscaíno as Isabel Reina Trujillo
- Carlos Camacho as Antonio "Toño" José Perdomo
- Cecilia Navia as Verónica Valencia
- Luis Eduardo Arango as Octavio Victoria
- Laura de León as Azucena Tinoco
- Manuel Sarmiento as Jorge Morales
- Diana Wiswell as Catalina Vengoechea
- Juliana Velásquez as Tatiana Perdomo Valencia
- Carlos Andrés Ramírez as Jerónimo Perdomo Valencia
- Camila Jurado as Juliana Morales Vengoechea
- Alejandra Ávila as Milagros Victoria Mora
- Variel Sánchez as Lorenzo Ríos
- Juliana Galvis as Lola
- Alina Lozano as Elvira Mora

=== Recurring ===
- Mónica Pardo as María Trujillo
- Juan Manuel Lenis as Fabián Vélez
- Luces Velásquez as Consuelo Daza
- Patrick Delmas as Alberto Sotillo
- Ana María Medina as Miranda

== Television rating ==
Viewership and ratings per season of Pa' quererte
Season	Timeslot (COT)	Episodes	First aired		Last aired		Avg. viewers (millions)
Season	Timeslot (COT)	Episodes	Date	Viewers (millions)	Date	Viewers (millions)	Avg. viewers (millions)
1	Mon–Fri 9:00pm	56	7 January 2020	6.6	20 March 2020	12.3	11.26
2	Mon–Fri 8:00pm	81	12 January 2021	8.6	7 May 2021	10.1	8.05

== Web series ==
Pa' quererte
- Genre: Comedy
- Country of origin: Colombia
- Original language: Spanish
- No. of seasons: 2
- No. of episodes: 20

Original release
- Release: 30 April 2020 – 14 January 2021

Pa' quererte en casa is a web series that premiered its first season on 30 April 2020 and ended on 2 July 2020. The season features a special for Father's Day, and it tells stories in parallel to the original story of how several of the characters and protagonists of the telenovela live during the COVID-19 pandemic. It was created for the reason of suspension of the filming of the telenovela, due to the pandemic.

=== Episodes ===
==== Season 1 (2020) ====
No.	Title	Original release date
1	"El reencuentro de Mauricio, Toño, Jorge y Octavio"	30 April 2020
2	"Ejercicio en casa"	7 May 2020
3	"El plan para que Octavio cumpla la cuarentena"	14 May 2020
4	"Mauricio, Toño y Jorge crean un plan para reconciliarse con Dany y Octavio"	21 May 2020
5	"Momentos difíciles en medio de la cuarentena"	28 May 2020
6	"Preocupación por el estado de salud de Mauricio"	4 June 2020
7	"El pretendiente de Isabel"	11 June 2020
8	"Momentos difíciles en medio de la cuarentena"	18 June 2020
9	"Mauricio le hace un gran favor a Octavio"	25 June 2020
10	"El pretendiente de Isabel pone en aprietos a Mauricio"	2 July 2020

==== Season 2 (2020–21) ====
No.	Title	Original release date
1	"Carlos Pérez, ¿el contrincante de Mauricio?"	12 November 2020
2	"Mauricio se lleva una gran sorpresa con el doctor Pérez"	19 November 2020
3	"Reto: objetos antiguos y modernos"	26 November 2020
4	"Ignacio, el gran chef"	3 December 2020
5	"La primera discusión de Isa e Ignacio"	10 December 2020
6	"Escuchando conversaciones ajenas"	17 December 2020
7	"Llegaron las vacaciones"	24 December 2020
8	"Papás en aprietos"	31 December 2020
9	"En búsqueda del perdón"	7 January 2021
10	"La invitación de Isabel"	14 January 2021
