= Lilo Vilaplana =

Cuban director, screenwriter and teacher

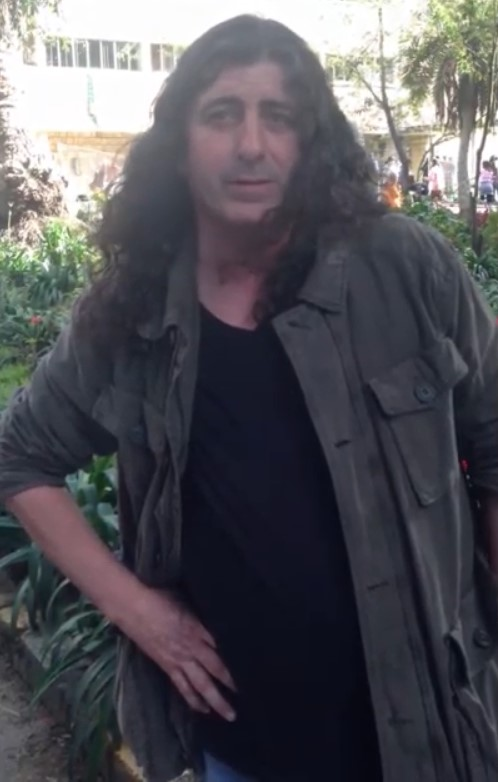
- Born: Lilo vilaplana Nuevitas, Camagüey, Cuba
- Occupations: Director, screenwriter
- Years active: 1988–present
- Spouse: Irasema Otero
- Children: 2
- Awards: Premios India Catalina; Mejor director de serie o miniserie 2010 • El capo Premios TVyNovelas; Mejor director de telenovela o serie 2010 • El capo

Lilo Vilaplana is a Cuban director, screenwriter and teacher.

== Career ==
In 1988, Vilaplana worked as an assistant director in children's series for directors such as Roberto Villar Aleman, Raul Guerra, María Elena Espinosa and Eduardo Macias.

He began his career as a screenwriter and director with the Children's live weekly program "Dando Vueltas" from 1991 to 1997, which is when he moved and settled in Colombia .

In Colombia he worked as creative in Film and TV Cine company and after several jobs are linked to FoxTelecolombia, a company which achieves greater recognition as Director of the series "El Capo".

== Colombian Television ==
- Short AGRYPNIA of production interdependent 2012 (Concursó en el Festival de Nuevo Cine Latinoamericano de La Habana, Cuba.) - Screenwriter and Director.

=== Fox Telecolombia ===
- Serie - El Capo 2 - Director.
- Telenovela - La Traicionera - Director.
- Serie - La Mariposa (2010/2011) - Director.
- Serie - Lynch - Director de los capítulos 2 y 6.
- Serie - Mentes en Shock (2010) - Director de los capítulos: 3, 8 y 9.
- Telenovela - "Un sueño llamado Salsa" - (2010) - Director.
- Serie - "El Capo" (90 Capítulos) - Director. (7 premios India Catalina y 7 premios TV y Novelas).
- Capítulo - "Remedio Mortal" de la serie Tiempo Final 3. (2009) - Director.
- Telenovela - "La Dama de Troya" (2008) - Director.
- Capítulo - "La Deuda" para el seriado "Sin Retorno" (2008) - Guionista y Director.
- Telenovela - "Zona Rosa" (2007) - Director a partir del capítulo 42.
- Telenovela - "Por Amor" (2006) - Director.
- Telenovela - "El pasado no perdona" (2005) - Director.
- Cortometraje - "Se me olvidó decirte" (Co Produce y escribe Héctor Forero de Escritores Asociados - 2004) - Coproductor y Director.
- Telenovela - "Me Amarás bajo la lluvia" (2004) - Director desde el Cap. 80 hasta el Cap. 240.
- Serie - "Retratos" 240 Capítulos. (2003) - Director.
- "Expedientes (2002 – 2003) - Director.
- "Unidad Investigativa" (2002 – 2003) - Director.
- Serie - "Auto Stop" (2002) - Thespis Producciones para TELECOLOMBIA - Canal UNO - Guionista, Productor y Director.
- "Justicia o Ley" Unitarios (2002). Thespis producciones para TELECOLOMBIA. Canal UNO. Guionista, Productor y Director de 45 capítulos.

Produce TVCINE:

- "Siguiendo el Rastro" (1997). Guionista y Director.
