= Marcela Mar =

Colombian actress

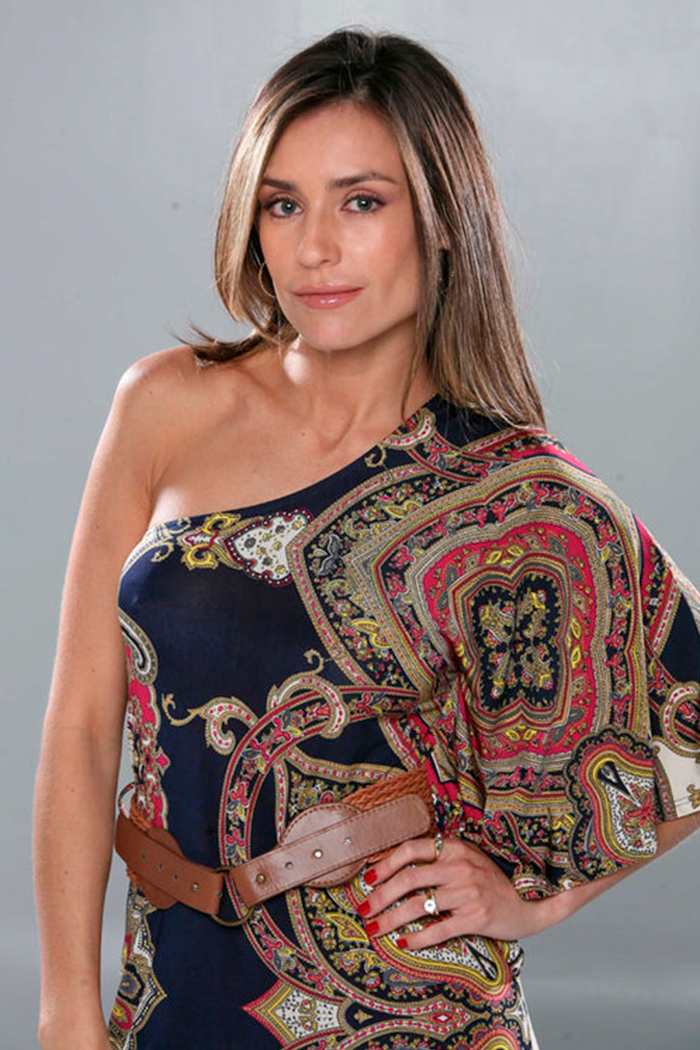
- Born: Marcela Gardeazabal Martínez; March 16, 1979 (age 47); Bogotá, Colombia
- Occupation: actress
- Children: 1

Marcela Gardeazabal Martínez (born March 16, 1979), better known by her stage name Marcela Mar, is a Colombian actress.

== Biography ==
She was born in Bogotá, Colombia and started her theater studies at the age of 8 when her parents enrolled her at the Teatro Nacional de Bogotá. She managed to conquer the audience in telenovelas such as Sin límites, Todos quieren con Marilyn, and Pedro el escamoso. She toured internationally with the play Dos Hermanas, and participated in international festivals in Bogotá and Manizales. She starred in the telenovela Pura sangre in 2007 as Florencia Lagos, and in 2009 she starred as Marcela Liévano in the television series El capo. In 2011 she played the role of Lucía Garfunkel in the television series Mentes en Shock. She currently stars as Doris, a villain alongside Aarón Díaz and Lola Ponce, in El Talismán.

In film she debuted in 2007 with the movie Satanas, playing the lead female role. That same year she would act in the movie Love in the Time of Cholera. After these films she decided to go by the last name Mar, as she felt it was easier to pronounce compared to Gardeazabal. Mar appeared in the 2016 film Abducted as villainess Maria Jimenez.

== Personal life ==
She was in a relationship with actor Gregorio Pernia for 5 years. They have a son called Emiliano.

== Awards ==
Premios India Catalina Col. 2005

Best Supporting Actress

Premios TV y Novelas Col. 2005

Best Supporting Actress

Premio Colombian Young Professionals

Association of the USA 2002 Best Dramatic Actress. Houston, Texas.

Premios TV y Novelas Col. 1998

Best Actress in a Television Series

Premios Shock Col. 1998

Best New Actress

== Filmography ==
Theater

- Abducted: The Jocelyn Shaker Story (2016) - Maria - U.S. TV film
- Cambio de Ruta (2014) - Victoria
- La cara oculta (2011) - Verónica.
- Love in the Time of Cholera - América Vicuña.
- Satanas (2007) - Paola.
- Tres hombres tres mujeres (2003) - Consuelo.
- El angel del accordion(2008)
- Dos Hermanas (2006).
- Carta de una Desconocida (2005–2006).
- Las Bella y Las Bestias (2003).
- Teatro del Parque (2000).
- La Basura (1996).
- Siete años de matrimonio (2013) Ana

== Telenovelas ==
- Manual Para Ser Feliz (2014)
- El Talismán (2012) - Doris de Negrete (Univision/Venevision)
- Infiltrados Canal Caracol
- Mujeres asesinas (Colombia) (2012) - Celeste, la sometida
- Mentes en Shock (2011) - Lucía Garfunkel
- Operación Jaque (2010) - Ingrid Betancourt
- El capo (2009–2013) - Marcela Liévano
- Pura sangre (2007) - Florencia Lagos.
- Reinas (2005) - Wendy.
- Todos quieren con Marilyn (2004) - Brigitte.
- Pedro el escamoso (2001) - Mayerli Pacheco
- Marido y Mujer (1999) - Daniela Ibáñez.
- Sin límites (1998) - María Mercedes "Mechas"
- Esperame al final (1992)
- El Chapo de Sinaloa (2018) - Berta
