= Sandra Reyes =

Colombian actress (1975–2024)

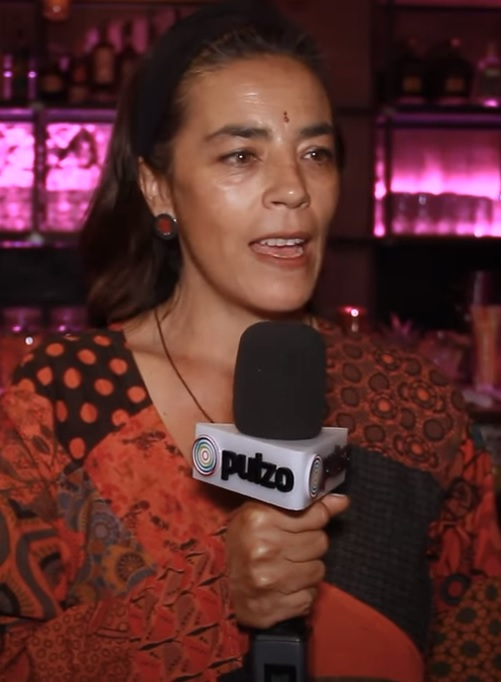
- Reyes in 2023
- Born: Sandra Reyes Robledo; May 31, 1975; Bogotá, Colombia
- Died: December 1, 2024 (aged 49)
- Occupation: Actress
- Years active: 1994–2024

Sandra Reyes Robledo (May 31, 1975 – December 1, 2024) was a Colombian actress who began her television career with the series Clase aparte, in 1994, playing María José. She then became known for her roles as Adriana Guerrero in La mujer del presidente in 1997, her lead role in the telenovela Pedro el escamoso in 2001 as Paula Dávila, and her role as Amparo Cadena in the series El Cartel de los sapos in 2008. Reyes died from breast cancer on December 1, 2024, at the age of 49.

== Filmography ==
=== Television ===
Year	Title	Character
1994	Clase aparte	María José Ricaurte
1996	El día es hoy	Sara
1996–1997	Leche	Mariela
1997–1998	La mujer del presidente	Adriana Guerrero
1998–1999	Tan cerca y tan lejos	Luna
1999–2000	Me llaman Lolita	Connie
2001	La pena máxima	Luz Dary
2001–2003	Pedro el escamoso	Paula Andrea Dávila Serna
2004–2005	La saga, negocio de familia	Pilar de Manrrique
2005–2006	Lorena	Carmen Ferrero
2007–2008	Nadie es eterno en el mundo	Guadalupe Maldonado
2008–2010	El cartel de los sapos	Amparo Cadena
2008–2009	Muñoz vale x2	Noelia Serrano
2011–2012	Tres milagros	Aleyda Ruiz de Rendón
2011	Gordo, Calvo y Bajito	Beatriz
2012	El laberinto	Adriana Guerrero
2014	Metástasis	Cielo Blanco
2015	Laura, La Santa colombiana	Ana Lucía
2016	Contra el tiempo	Cecilia Sánchez Caicedo
2016–2017	Cuando vivas conmigo	Gertrudis López
2018	Paraíso travel	Cecilia
2020	Enfermeras	Mélida Palacio
2020	Libertador	Julia Velázquez
2020	Verdad oculta	Belén Caicedo
2022	El Paraíso	Selmira
2022	Ay hombre	Helena
2023	Ventino: El precio de la gloria	Amanda Afanador
2023–2024	Rigo	Aracely Urán de Urán
2024	Pedro el escamoso: más escamoso que nunca	Paula Andrea Dávila Serna

== Awards and nominations ==
=== India Catalina Awards ===
Year	Category	Telenovela or Series	Result
2012	Best Supporting Actress in a Series	3 Milagros	Nominated
2009	Best Leading Actress in a Telenovela	Muñoz vale por 2	Nominated
2009	Best Leading Actress in a Series or Miniseries	El cartel	Nominated
2002	Best Leading Actress	Pedro el escamoso	Nominated
1998	Best Leading Actress	La mujer del presidente	Nominated

=== TVyNovelas Awards ===
Year	Category	Telenovela or Series	Result
2013	Best Leading Actress in a Series	El laberinto	Nominated
2012	Best Supporting Actress in a Series	3 Milagros	Nominated
2009	Best Antagonistic Actress	El cartel	Nominated
2002	Best Leading Actress in a Telenovela	Pedro el escamoso	Nominated
1998	Best Leading Actress in a Series	La mujer del presidente	Winner
1998	Best New Actress	La mujer del presidente	Nominated

=== Other awards ===
- Caracol Award for Best Leading Actress, for Pedro el Escamoso.
