= Juliette Pardau =

Venezuelan actress and singer (born 1986)

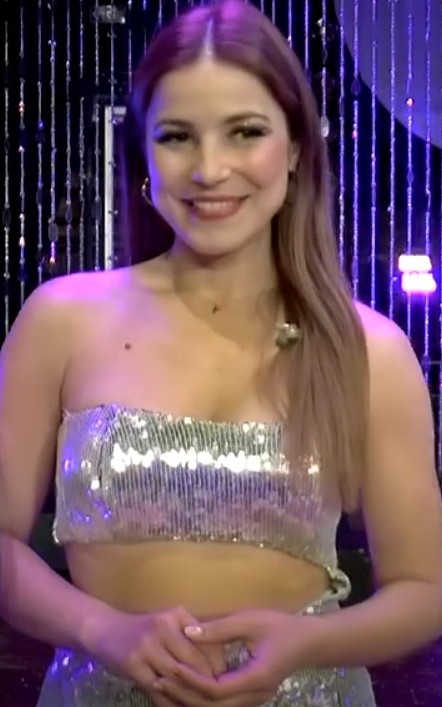
- Born: Juliette Marian Del Valle Pardau López; August 21, 1986 (age 38); Caracas, Venezuela
- Occupation(s): Actress, Singer

Juliette Marian Del Valle Pardau López (born 21 August 1986) is a Venezuelan actress and singer.

== Career ==
Juliette became interested in the performing arts at the age of 12 and while at school, she participated in small plays. She graduated from the Universidad Central de Venezuela with a Bachelor's degree in social communication.

In 2011, she participated in the telenovela Natalia del Mar where she played a blind girl. Her character was well received by the critics.

In 2013, she became part of the telenovela De todas maneras rosa where she plays Patricia, a rebellious girl and leader of a musical band called Serpientes Venenosas.

== Television ==
- Harina de otro costal (2010) as "Coromotico" Hernández
- Natalia del Mar (2011) as Rosario Uribe
- De todas maneras Rosa (2013) as Patricia Macho Vergara
- El tesoro (2016) as Jenny Murcia
- El Chapo (2017) as Graciela Guzmán
- La Nocturna (2017) as Lucy
- Pa’ quererte (2020) as Danny Daza
- Falsa Identidad (first season) as gabriela

== Films ==
- Papita, maní, tostón (2013)
- La Rectora (2014 - Colombian Film)
- Papita 2da base (Dec 2017)
- Bolívar (Netflix series - TV Caracol 2019)
