= Diego Trujillo =

Colombian actor (born 1960)

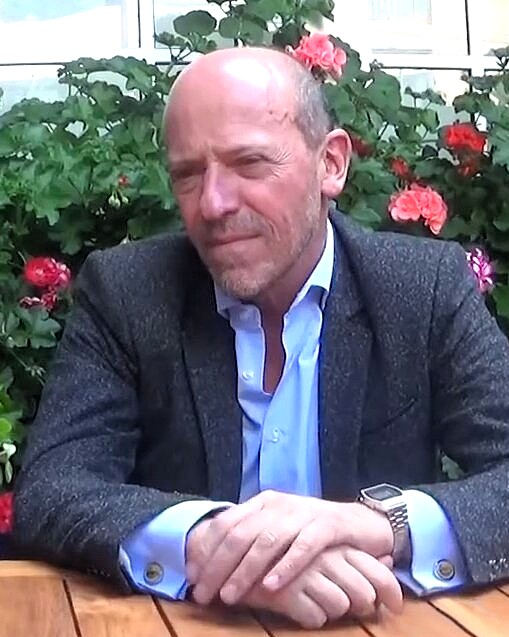
- Trujillo in 2017
- Born: Diego Ignacio Trujillo Dangond; June 30, 1960 (age 65); Bogotá, Colombia
- Occupations: Actor; architect; comedian
- Years active: 1993–present
- Children: 3

Diego Ignacio Trujillo Dangond (born June 30, 1960) is a Colombian actor, architect and comedian. He is known for playing Walter Blanco in Metástasis, a Colombian remake of Breaking Bad.

== Life and career ==
Diego Ignacio Trujillo Dangond was born on June 30, 1960, in Bogotá. He studied at the Gimnasio Moderno school, where he occasionally did theatre as a hobby. After graduating, he decided to study architecture at the Pilot University of Colombia, and worked in that profession for twelve years.

He has had a long history in television and has acted in many telenovelas since 1993.

His film career began in 2000 with his work in Taylor Hackford's film Proof of Life, starring Meg Ryan and Russell Crowe, in which he was cast because of his excellent command of English.

In 2013, Trujillo was cast as Walter Blanco in the Spanish-language remake of Breaking Bad entitled Metástasis.

== Filmography ==
=== Television ===
- De pies a cabeza (1993)
- La maldición del paraíso (1993)
- Tiempos difíciles (1995)
- Mascarada (1995)
- Perro amor (1998)
- El fiscal (1999)
- Por qué diablos (1999)
- Brujeres (2000)
- Pobre Pablo (2001)
- La costeña y el cachaco (2003) - Simon (El Italiano)
- Todos quieren con Marilyn (2004)
- Protagonistas de Novela 3 "El juicio final" (2004)
- Los Reyes (2005) - Emilio Iriarte De las Casas
- Amas de casa desesperadas (2006–2008)
- Tiempo final (Fox) (2007)
- Infieles anónimos (2007)
- El poder del diez (2008) - Presentador
- El Capo (Colombia) (2009)
- A corazón abierto (2010)
- La Pola (telenovela) (2010) - Domingo García
- ¿Dónde Carajos esta Umaña? (2012) - Patricio Umaña
- Metástasis (2014) - Walter Blanco
- Griselda (miniseries) (2024) - German Panesso

=== Film ===
- Prueba de vida (2000)
- Tres hombres tres mujeres (2003)
- Cuando rompen las olas (2005)
- El trato (2005)
- Martillo (2005)
- Dios los junta y ellos se separan (2006)
- Pócima (2008) - Tomas Herrera
- Riverside (2009)

=== Theater ===
- En carne propia (1996)
- Muelle oeste (2001)
- La noche árabe (2006)
- Cita a ciegas (2007)
- ¡Qué desgracia tan infinita! (2009) Stand up comedy
- El crédito (2016)
