= List of Caracol Televisión telenovelas and series =

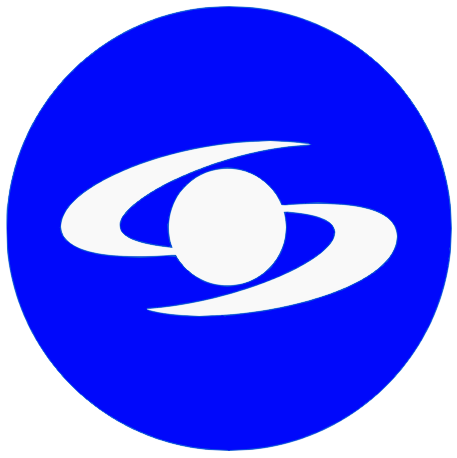

The following is a list of telenovelas and television series produced by Caracol Televisión.

== 1970s ==
No.	Title	Episodes	Original release		Network
No.	Title	Episodes	First aired	Last aired	Network
1972
1	Teatro popular Caracol	N/A	1972	1978	Segunda Cadena; Primera Cadena
1975
2	Manuela	297	1975	1976	Segunda Cadena; Primera Cadena
1977
3	Gabriela	N/A	N/A	N/A	Segunda Cadena; Primera Cadena
4	Almas malditas	N/A	N/A	N/A	Segunda Cadena; Primera Cadena
1978
5	El diario de Ana Frank	N/A	N/A	N/A	Primera Cadena
6	Lejos del nido	N/A	N/A	N/A	Primera Cadena
1979
7	Un tal Bernabé Bernal	N/A	N/A	N/A	Primera Cadena
8	Kundry	N/A	N/A	N/A	Primera Cadena
9	Teresa Valverde	80	8 August 1979	28 November 1979	Primera Cadena
10	Querido Andrés	N/A	N/A	N/A	Primera Cadena

== 1980s ==
No.	Title	Episodes	Original release		Network
No.	Title	Episodes	First aired	Last aired	Network
1980
1	Andrea	N/A	N/A	N/A	Primera Cadena
1981
2	Su majestad el dinero	N/A	N/A	N/A	Primera Cadena
3	Sur verde	N/A	1980	1981	Primera Cadena
4	El secreto de la solterona	N/A	N/A	N/A	Primera Cadena
1982
5	La mala hierba	N/A	N/A	N/A	Segunda Cadena
6	La bruja de las minas	N/A	N/A	N/A	Segunda Cadena
7	La duda	N/A	N/A	N/A	Segunda Cadena
8	Flor de fango	N/A	N/A	N/A	Segunda Cadena
1983
9	El bazar de los idiotas	N/A	N/A	N/A	Segunda Cadena
10	Las voces del silencio	N/A	N/A	N/A	Segunda Cadena
11	Amarga verdad	N/A	N/A	N/A	Segunda Cadena
1984
12	Pero sigo siendo el rey	N/A	23 January 1984	June 1984	Cadena Uno
13	El Faraón	N/A	June 1984	October 1984	Cadena Uno
14	La estrella de las Baum	N/A	N/A	N/A	Cadena Uno
1985
15	Los impostores	N/A	N/A	N/A	Cadena Uno
16	Notas de sociedad	N/A	N/A	N/A	Cadena Uno
17	Por ti, Laura	N/A	N/A	N/A	Cadena Uno
18	Tuyo es mi corazón	56	22 October 1985	4 April 1986	Cadena Uno
1986
19	Marina de noche	N/A	N/A	N/A	Cadena Uno
20	Gallito Ramírez	139	11 August 1986	6 March 1987	Cadena Uno
1987
21	San Tropel	142	January 1987	5 February 1988	Cadena Dos
22	El divino	N/A	N/A	N/A	Cadena Uno
1988
23	Caballo viejo	70	8 February 1988	9 September 1988	Cadena Dos
24	¡Quieta, Margarita!	N/A	12 September 1988	9 June 1989	Cadena Dos
1989
25	Las Ibáñez	13	10 June 1989	19 August 1989	Cadena Dos
26	Calamar	N/A	12 June 1989	1990	Cadena Dos

== 1990s ==
No.	Title	Episodes	Original release		Network
No.	Title	Episodes	First aired	Last aired	Network
1990
1	Música maestro	300	16 April 1990	April 1991	Cadena Dos
2	El carretero	N/A	N/A	N/A	Cadena Uno
1991
3	Escalona	33	15 January 1991	14 February 1991	Cadena Uno
4	La locha	N/A	N/A	N/A	Cadena Uno
5	Sombra de tu sombra	N/A	N/A	N/A	Cadena Dos
1992
6	La pantera	63	2 January 1992	N/A	Cadena Uno
7	La 40, la calle del amor	N/A	N/A	N/A	Cadena Uno
8	El último beso	100	25 November 1992	11 November 1993	Cadena Uno
9	La mujer doble	116	25 November 1992	1993	Cadena Uno
10	Pasiones secretas	227	25 November 1992	10 November 1993	Cadena Uno
1993
11	Detrás de un ángel	58	6 September 1993	1994	Cadena Uno
12	Solo una mujer	225	11 November 1993	10 October 1994	Cadena Uno
1994
13	Candela	119	1994	1995	Cadena Uno
14	Tentaciones	115	1994	1998	Cadena Uno
15	Soledad	60	1994	1995	Cadena Uno
16	Almas de piedra	47	1994	1994	Cadena Uno
1995
17	Las ejecutivas	78	1995	1996	Cadena Uno
18	Leche	26	1995	1996	Cadena Uno
19	Flor de oro	65	1995	1995	Cadena Uno
20	Hombres de honor	156	10 June 1995	15 January 2000	Cadena Uno; Caracol Televisión
21	La sombra del deseo	110	20 October 1995	25 November 1996	Cadena Uno
1996
22	Prisioneros del amor	270	16 October 1996	2 January 1998	Cadena Uno
23	Cartas de amor	N/A	N/A	N/A	Cadena Uno
1997
24	La mujer del presidente	60	17 July 1997	10 October 1998	Cadena Uno; Caracol Televisión
25	Juliana, ¡qué mala eres!	40	1997	1999	Cadena Uno; Caracol Televisión
26	La elegida	58	1997	1998	Canal Uno
1998
27	¡Ay cosita linda mamá!	150	27 January 1998	7 June 1999	Cadena Uno; Caracol Televisión
28	Rosas del atardecer	N/A	N/A	N/A	Canal Uno
29	Dios se lo pague	260	10 July 1998	4 June 1999	Cadena Uno; Caracol Televisión
30	Sin límites	N/A	N/A	N/A	Canal Uno
31	Héroes de turno	210	27 August 1998	1 September 2000	Caracol Televisión
32	El amor es más fuerte	87	24 August 1998	2 April 1999	Caracol Televisión
33	La dama del pantano	135	5 October 1998	4 June 1999	Caracol Televisión
34	Los Gil	N/A	N/A	N/A	Caracol Televisión
1999
35	Padres e hijos	N/A	1999	21 August 2009	Cadena Uno; Caracol Televisión
36	Marido y mujer	108	14 February 1999	27 June 1999	Caracol Televisión
37	Alejo, la búsqueda del amor	180	11 May 1999	29 January 2000	Caracol Televisión
38	La guerra de las Rosas	161	13 May 1999	14 February 2000	Caracol Televisión
39	Julius	160	1999	1999	Caracol Televisión
40	La Caponera	146	1999	2000	Caracol Televisión

== 2000s ==
No.	Title	Episodes	Original release		Network
No.	Title	Episodes	First aired	Last aired	Network
2000
1	La reina de Queens	N/A	N/A	N/A	Caracol Televisión
2	Se armó la gorda	160	4 July 2000	23 August 2001	Caracol Televisión
3	La baby sister	160	27 September 2000	8 May 2001	Caracol Televisión
4	Rauzán	100	23 October 2000	9 February 2001	Caracol Televisión
5	Traga maluca	112	2000	2001	Caracol Televisión
2001
6	Amantes del desierto	121	19 March 2001	4 September 2001	Telemundo; Caracol Televisión
7	Pedro el escamoso	327	19 April 2001	21 February 2003	Caracol Televisión
8	Amor a mil	124	2001	2001	Caracol Televisión
9	Luzbel está de visita	104	16 August 2001	27 July 2002	Telemundo; Caracol Televisión
10	Historias de hombres sólo para mujeres	285	2001	2003	Caracol Televisión
2002
11	Siete veces Amada	109	1 April 2002	27 August 2002	Caracol Televisión
12	María Madrugada	119	10 May 2002	2003	Caracol Televisión
13	Mi pequeña mamá	92	2002	2002	Caracol Televisión
14	La venganza	127	4 November 2002	16 May 2003	Telemundo; Caracol Televisión
15	Pecados capitales	162	12 November 2002	26 March 2004	Caracol Televisión
2003
16	Sofía dame tiempo	130	3 March 2003	7 October 2003	Telemundo; Caracol Televisión
17	La jaula	30	2003	2003	Caracol Televisión
18	Como Pedro por su casa	N/A	N/A	N/A	Telemundo; Caracol Televisión
19	Ángel de la guarda, mi dulce compañía	122	15 September 2003	23 July 2004	Telemundo; Caracol Televisión
20	Pasión de gavilanes	188	21 October 2003	31 May 2022	Telemundo; Caracol Televisión
21	El auténtico Rodrigo Leal	101	23 November 2003	13 May 2004	Caracol Televisión
2004
22	Prisionera	180	10 March 2004	6 December 2004	Telemundo; Caracol Televisión
23	Mesa para tres	118	15 March 2004	February 2005	Caracol Televisión
24	El vuelo de la cometa	—	—	—	Caracol Televisión
25	Luna, la heredera	120	24 July 2004	21 August 2005	Caracol Televisión
26	Séptima puerta	262	12 August 2004	21 November 2005	Caracol Televisión
27	Te voy a enseñar a querer	129	31 August 2004	14 March 2005	Telemundo; Caracol Televisión
28	La saga, negocio de familia	186	20 September 2004	29 September 2005	Caracol Televisión
29	Casados con hijos	127	5 October 2004	17 March 2006	Caracol Televisión
30	Dora, la celadora	122	23 October 2004	17 March 2005	Caracol Televisión
31	La mujer en el espejo	151	7 December 2004	18 July 2005	Telemundo; Caracol Televisión
2005
32	El baile de la vida	171	16 August 2005	3 May 2006	Caracol Televisión
33	Vuelo 1503	120	17 August 2005	26 September 2006	Caracol Televisión
34	La Tormenta	216	19 September 2005	24 July 2006	Telemundo; Caracol Televisión
35	Por amor a Gloria	110	13 October 2005	17 March 2006	Caracol Televisión
36	Decisiones	323	11 November 2005	25 January 2008	Telemundo; Caracol Televisión
2006
37	Don Roque buena papa	N/A	N/A	N/A	Caracol Televisión
38	La ex	159	20 March 2006	2 March 2007	Caracol Televisión
39	Divinas tentaciones	N/A	N/A	N/A	Caracol Televisión
40	Amores cruzados	120	17 April 2006	29 September 2006	Caracol Televisión
41	Criminal	N/A	2006	2006	Caracol Televisión
42	Buscando el cielo	N/A	N/A	N/A	Caracol Televisión
43	Sin tetas no hay paraíso	23	16 August 2006	13 October 2006	Caracol Televisión
44	Tu voz estéreo	2900	1 September 2006	25 March 2020	Caracol Televisión
45	La diva	100	29 September 2006	10 February 2007	Caracol Televisión
46	¿Quién manda a quién?	N/A	N/A	N/A	Caracol Televisión
47	Las profesionales, a su servicio	95	29 November 2006	3 August 2007	Caracol Televisión
48	El engaño	23	2006	2007	Caracol Televisión
2007
49	El Zorro, la espada y la rosa	117	12 February 2007	23 July 2007	Telemundo; Caracol Televisión
50	El ventilador	58	19 February 2007	24 May 2007	Caracol Televisión
51	Pocholo	120	9 May 2007	23 February 2008	Caracol Televisión
52	Nadie es eterno en el mundo	150	9 April 2007	8 June 2008	Caracol Televisión
53	Nuevo rico, nuevo pobre	194	16 July 2007	11 August 2008	Caracol Televisión
54	Sobregiro de amor	78	23 August 2007	9 January 2008	Caracol Televisión
55	Montecristo	150	18 October 2007	16 July 2008	Caracol Televisión
2008
56	¿Quién amará a María?	30	25 March 2008	2 June 2008	Caracol Televisión
57	El cartel	107	4 June 2008	21 May 2010	Caracol Televisión
58	La quiero a morir	120	16 July 2008	8 July 2009	Caracol Televisión
59	Vecinos	190	1 September 2008	13 October 2009	Caracol Televisión
60	Oye bonita	170	27 October 2008	3 March 2010	Caracol Televisión
2009
61	Bermúdez	80	2 February 2009	21 August 2009	Caracol Televisión
62	Wachendó	12	April, 2009		Caracol Televisión
63	Gabriela, giros del destino	120	1 July 2009	8 May 2010	Caracol Televisión
64	Las muñecas de la mafia	118	28 September 2009	30 September 2019	Caracol Televisión; Netflix
65	La bella Ceci y el imprudente	183	23 November 2009	26 August 2010	Caracol Televisión

== 2010s ==
No.	Title	Season	Original release				Network	Ref.
No.	Title	Season	First aired	Viewers (millions)	Last aired	Viewers (millions)	Network	Ref.
2010
1	El Encantador	1 season, 43 episodes	4 February 2010	TBD	TBD	TBD	Caracol Televisión	
2	Los caballeros las prefieren brutas	2 seasons, 62 episodes	22 February 2010	TBD	TBD	TBD	Sony Entertainment Television; Caracol Televisión	
3	Yo no te pido la luna	1 season, 58 episodes	3 March 2010	TBD	27 September 2010	TBD	Caracol Televisión	
4	Bella Calamidades	1 season, 140 episodes	24 March 2010	TBD	23 November 2010	TBD	Telemundo; Caracol Televisión	
5	Operación Jaque	1 season, 2 episodes	20 July 2010				Caracol Televisión; Televisión Española	
6	Clase ejecutiva	1 season, 20 episodes	21 June 2010	TBD	19 July 2010	TBD	Caracol Televisión	
7	Tierra de cantores	1 season, 40 episodes	11 August 2010	TBD	24 September 2010	TBD	Caracol Televisión	
8	La magia de Sofía	TBD	TBD	TBD	TBD	TBD	Caracol Televisión	
9	Secretos de familia	1 season, 99 episodes	30 August 2010	TBD	10 February 2011	TBD	Caracol Televisión	
10	Hilos de amor	1 season, 112 episodes	4 October 2010	TBD	18 February 2011	TBD	Caracol Televisión	
2011
11	La Teacher de Inglés	1 season, 106 episodes	11 January 2011	TBD	27 May 2011	TBD	Caracol Televisión	
12	Amar y temer	1 season, 90 episodes	23 February 2011	TBD	11 November 2011	TBD	Caracol Televisión	
13	La Bruja	1 season, 30 episodes	30 May 2011	TBD	3 August 2011	TBD	Caracol Televisión	
14	El secretario	1 season, 123 episodes	22 August 2011	TBD	30 May 2012	TBD	Caracol Televisión	
15	Infiltrados	2 seasons, 36 episodes	31 August 2011	TBD	24 October 2011	TBD	Caracol Televisión	
16	Primera Dama	1 seasons, 156 episodes	8 November 2011	TBD	6 July 2012	TBD	Caracol Televisión	
17	Los canarios	1 season, 110 episodes	12 December 2011	TBD	4 May 2012	TBD	Caracol Televisión	
2012
18	El laberinto	1 season, 41 episodes	10 January 2012	TBD	3 May 2012	TBD	Caracol Televisión	
19	Amor de carnaval	1 season, 52 episodes	16 April 2012	TBD	6 July 2012	TBD	Caracol Televisión	
20	¿Dónde carajos está Umaña?	1 season, 140 episodes	7 May 2012	TBD	1 February 2013	TBD	Caracol Televisión	
21	Pablo Escobar, el patrón del mal	1 season, 74 episodes	28 May 2012	TBD	19 November 2012	TBD	Caracol Televisión	
22	La ruta blanca	1 season, 92 episodes	13 August 2012	TBD	16 December 2012	TBD	Cadenatres	
23	Rafael Orozco, el ídolo	1 season, 90 episodes	20 November 2012	TBD	1 April 2013	TBD	Caracol Televisión	
2013
24	La promesa	1 season, 60 episodes	4 March 2013	TBD	24 May 2013	TBD	Caracol Televisión	
25	La hipocondríaca	1 season, 120 episodes	2 April 2013	TBD	27 September 2013	TBD	Caracol Televisión	
26	El Señor de los Cielos (season 1)	74 episodes	15 April 2013		5 August 2013		Telemundo; Caracol Televisión	
27	5 viudas sueltas	1 season, 149 episodes	27 May 2013	TBD	10 January 2014	TBD	Caracol Televisión	
28	La selección	2 seasons, 141 episodes	3 June 2013	TBD	1 August 2014	TBD	Caracol Televisión	
29	Mentiras perfectas	1 season, 58 episodes	28 October 2013	TBD	24 January 2014	TBD	Caracol Televisión	
2014
30	Bazurto	1 season, 63 episodes	13 January 2014	9.8	31 March 2014	9.2	Caracol Televisión	
31	La ronca de oro	1 season, 62 episodes	27 January 2014	15.8	25 April 2014	14.6	Caracol Televisión	
32	La viuda negra	2 seasons, 139 episodes	23 February 2014		22 May 2016		Univision; Caracol Televisión	
33	Los años maravillosos	1 season, 34 episodes	8 March 2014	6.5	25 October 2014	TBD	Caracol Televisión	
34	La suegra	1 season, 100 episodes	1 April 2014	10.2	29 August 2014	9.5	Caracol Televisión	
35	Metástasis	1 season, 62 episodes	8 June 2014		18 September 2014		UniMás; Caracol Televisión	
36	Fugitivos	1 season, 40 episodes	4 August 2014	9.5	3 October 2014	11.6	Caracol Televisión	
37	Niche	1 season, 100 episodes	6 October 2014	14.8	6 March 2015	TBD	Caracol Televisión	
2015
38	Tiro de gracia	TBD	9 March 2015	8.1	29 May 2015	9.8	Caracol Televisión	
39	Esmeraldas	1 season, 64 episodes	14 April 2015	7.1	17 July 2015	3.6	Caracol Televisión	
40	La tusa	1 season, 41 episodes	1 June 2015	TBD	28 July 2015	7.8	Caracol Televisión	
41	Dulce amor	1 season, 115 episodes	21 July 2015	4.4	15 June 2016	6.5	Caracol Televisión	
42	Laura, una vida extraordinaria	1 season, 25 episodes	29 July 2015	7.6	1 September 2015	TBD	Caracol Televisión	
2016
43	Sinú, río de pasiones	1 season, 61 episodes	18 January 2016	8.5	19 April 2016	8.1	Caracol Televisión	
44	La esclava blanca	1 season, 62 episodes	26 January 2016	11.1	25 April 2016	13.8	Caracol Televisión	
45	El tesoro	1 season, 77 episodes	20 April 2016	7.5	23 August 2016	8.0	Caracol Televisión	
46	La Niña	1 season, 86 episodes	26 April 2016	13.7	16 September 2016	13.7	Caracol Televisión	
47	Cuando vivas conmigo	1 season, 72 episodes	19 September 2016	11.5	6 January 2017	TBD	Caracol Televisión	
2017
48	Polvo carnavalero	1 season, 90 episodes	10 January 2017	10.2	19 May 2017	TBD	Caracol Televisión	
49	Sobreviviendo a Escobar, Alias JJ	1 season, 60 episodes	8 February 2017	8.4	23 May 2017	9.8	Caracol Televisión	
50	Los Morales	1 season, 74 episodes	22 May 2017	12.8	11 September 2017	17.5	Caracol Televisión	
51	La Nocturna	2 seasons, 184 episodes	24 May 2017	7.5 (s. 1) 5.4(s. 2)	4 May 2020	12.0	Caracol Televisión	
52	Tarde lo conocí	1 season, 105 episodes	12 September 2017	13.5	23 February 2018	16.7	Caracol Televisión	
53	La Cacica	1 season, 40 episodes	1 November 2017	8.2	5 January 2018	8.5	Caracol Televisión	
2018
54	La mamá del 10	1 season, 68 episodes	26 February 2018	11.9	8 June 2018	15.1	Caracol Televisión	
55	La reina del flow	3 seasons, 237 episodes	12 June 2018	15.4 (Note: First season rating)	21 April 2026	21.7	Caracol Televisión	
56	La ley secreta	1 season, 60 episodes	31 August 2018 (Available for worldwide, except for Colombia)				Netflix	
57	Loquito por ti	1 season, 80 episodes	10 October 2018	18.7	8 February 2019	16.0	Caracol Televisión	
2019
58	El Bronx	1 season, 81 episodes	29 January 2019	12.1	27 May 2019	12.7	Caracol Televisión	
59	La gloria de Lucho	1 season, 80 episodes	11 February 2019	12.5	7 June 2019	13.2	Caracol Televisión	
60	Siempre Bruja	2 seasons, 18 episodes	19 February 2019		28 February 2020		Netflix	
61	Un bandido honrado	1 season, 63 episodes (Note: Unlike its original broadcast that were a total of 61 episodes. A total of 63 episodes are available on Netflix.)	10 June 2019	12.3	9 September 2019	10.4	Caracol Televisión	
62	Bolívar	1 season, 63 episodes	18 September 2019	11.7	20 December 2019	8.1	Caracol Televisión	
63	El hijo del Cacique	1 season, 80 episodes	15 October 2019		11 February 2020		Televen; Caracol Televisión	
64	Los Briceño	1 season, 63 episodes	4 December 2019 (Available for worldwide, except for Colombia)				Netflix	

== 2020s ==
No.	Title	Season	Original release				Network	Ref.
No.	Title	Season	First aired	Viewers (millions)	Last aired	Viewers (millions)	Network	Ref.
2020
1	Amar y vivir	1 season, 63 episodes	7 January 2020	10.4	14 April 2020	15.4	Caracol Televisión	
2	La venganza de Analía	2 seasons, 120 episodes	15 April 2020	11.4 (s. 1) 7.0 (s. 2)	12 September 2025	15.7 (s. 1) 7.3 (s. 2)	Caracol Televisión	
3	Chichipatos	2 seasons, 15 episodes	15 May 2020		30 April 2021		Netflix	
4	La reina de Indias y el conquistador	1 season, 60 episodes	20 May 2020 (Available worldwide, except for Colombia)				Netflix	
2021
5	El Cartel de los Sapos: el origen	1 season, 60 episodes	28 July 2021 (Available worldwide, except for Colombia)				Netflix	
2022
6	Arelys Henao	2 seasons, 129 episodes	11 January 2022	12.7 (s. 1) 7.1 (s. 2)	15 April 2024	11.9 (s. 1) 6.7 (s. 2)	Caracol Televisión	
7	Ritmo salvaje	1 season, 8 episodes	2 March 2022				Netflix	
8	Las Villamizar	1 season, 72 episodes	18 April 2022	9.6	2 August 2022	10.3	Caracol Televisión	
8	El rey, Vicente Fernández	1 season, 32 episodes	3 August 2022	11.0	16 September 2022	6.5	Caracol Televisión	
9	Entre sombras	1 season, 60 episodes	19 September 2022	7.5	16 December 2022	6.9	Caracol Televisión	
10	A grito herido	1 season, 10 episodes	11 November 2022				Amazon Prime Video	
2023
11	Los Medallistas	1 season, 64 episodes	8 February 2023	N/A	15 May 2023	4.2	Caracol Televisión	
12	La primera vez	4 seasons, 45 episodes	15 February 2023		18 March 2026		Netflix	
13	Ventino: El precio de la gloria	1 season, 60 episodes	1 March 2023	5.1	30 May 2023	6.5	Caracol Televisión	
14	La vida después del reality	1 season, 6 episodes	1 May 2023				Amazon Prime Video	
15	Romina poderosa	1 season, 65 episodes	31 May 2023	5.5	11 September 2023	9.3	Caracol Televisión	
16	Paraíso blanco	2 seasons, 30 episodes	20 July 2023		18 July 2024		Vix	
17	La influencer	1 season, 60 episodes	13 December 2023 (Available worldwide, except for Colombia)		21 February 2024 (Available worldwide, except for Colombia)		Netflix	
2024
18	Devuélveme la vida	1 season, 60 episodes	16 April 2024	7.1	15 July 2024	9.5	Caracol Televisión	
19	Pedro el escamoso: más escamoso que nunca	1 season, 23 episodes	16 July 2024	9.8	16 July 2024	9.3	Caracol Televisión; Disney+	
20	Klass 95	1 season, 45 episodes	20 August 2024	8.6	25 October 2024	6.5	Caracol Televisión	
21	Escupiré sobre sus tumbas	1 season, 60 episodes	28 October 2024	7.2	7 February 2025	8.4	Caracol Televisión	
2025
22	Nuevo rico, nuevo pobre	1 season, 62 episodes	10 February 2025	8.0	14 May 2025	9.1	Caracol Televisión	
2026
23	María la caprichosa	1 season, 64 episodes	5 January 2026 (Available worldwide, except for Colombia)				Netflix	
24	Salcedo, cuero y boogaloo	1 season, 12 episodes	8 July 2026				Netflix	
25	La mujer prohibida	1 season, 61 episodes	29 July 2026 (Available worldwide, except for Colombia)				Netflix	
26	Aquel	1 season, 8 episodes	9 October 2026				Netflix	
27	¿En qué lío me metí?	TBD	9 November 2026	TBD	TBA	TBD	Caracol Televisión	
