= Hugo Gómez =

Colombian actor

- Born: Hugo Gómez Fernández; 11 March 1948 (age 78); Bogotá, Colombia
- Occupation: Actor
- Years active: 1977–present

Hugo Gómez Fernández (born 11 March 1948 in Bogotá) is an actor of cinema and Colombian television.

== Filmography ==
=== Television ===
Year	Title	Character	Channel
2020	El General Naranjo	Fiscal	Fox Premium
2019–2021	Enfermeras	Valeriano Perez	Canal RCN
2019–2020	El hijo del Cacique		Televen
2019	La reina del sur 2	Father Anselmo Garrido	Telemundo
2018–2019	La ley del corazón		Canal RCN
2017	El chapo	Federico Livas	Netflix
2014	Contra las cuerdas	Hugo Diaz	Canal RCN
2011–2012	El secretario	Alberto Ayala (Minister)	Caracol Televisión
2009–2010	Amor en custodia	Walter Camacho	Canal RCN
2007–2008	Nuevo rico, nuevo pobre	Leonidas Galindo	Caracol Televisión
2005–2006	La Tormenta	Campoelías Camacho	Telemundo
2003–2004	Ángel de la guarda, mi dulce compañía	Antonio Falla	Telemundo
2000–2001	La Baby Sister	Fidel Rivera	Caracol Televisión
1990–1995	N. N.		
1988–1990	Amar y vivir		Cadena 1
1998	Hermosa niña		Cadena 1
1987	La posada		Cadena 1
1982	Don Chinche	Doctor Largacha	Cadena 1
1991	Sombra de tu sombra		

== Cinema ==
Year	Title
2011	El Jefe
2007	Chispazos
2001	Bogotá 2016
1987	El embajador de la India
