= Newly Rich, Newly Poor =

Newly Rich, Newly Poor may refer to either of two Colombian telenovelas:

- Newly Rich, Newly Poor (2007 TV series)
- Newly Rich, Newly Poor (2025 TV series), a remake of the 2007 telenovela
