= César Mora =

Colombian musician

Cesar Mora
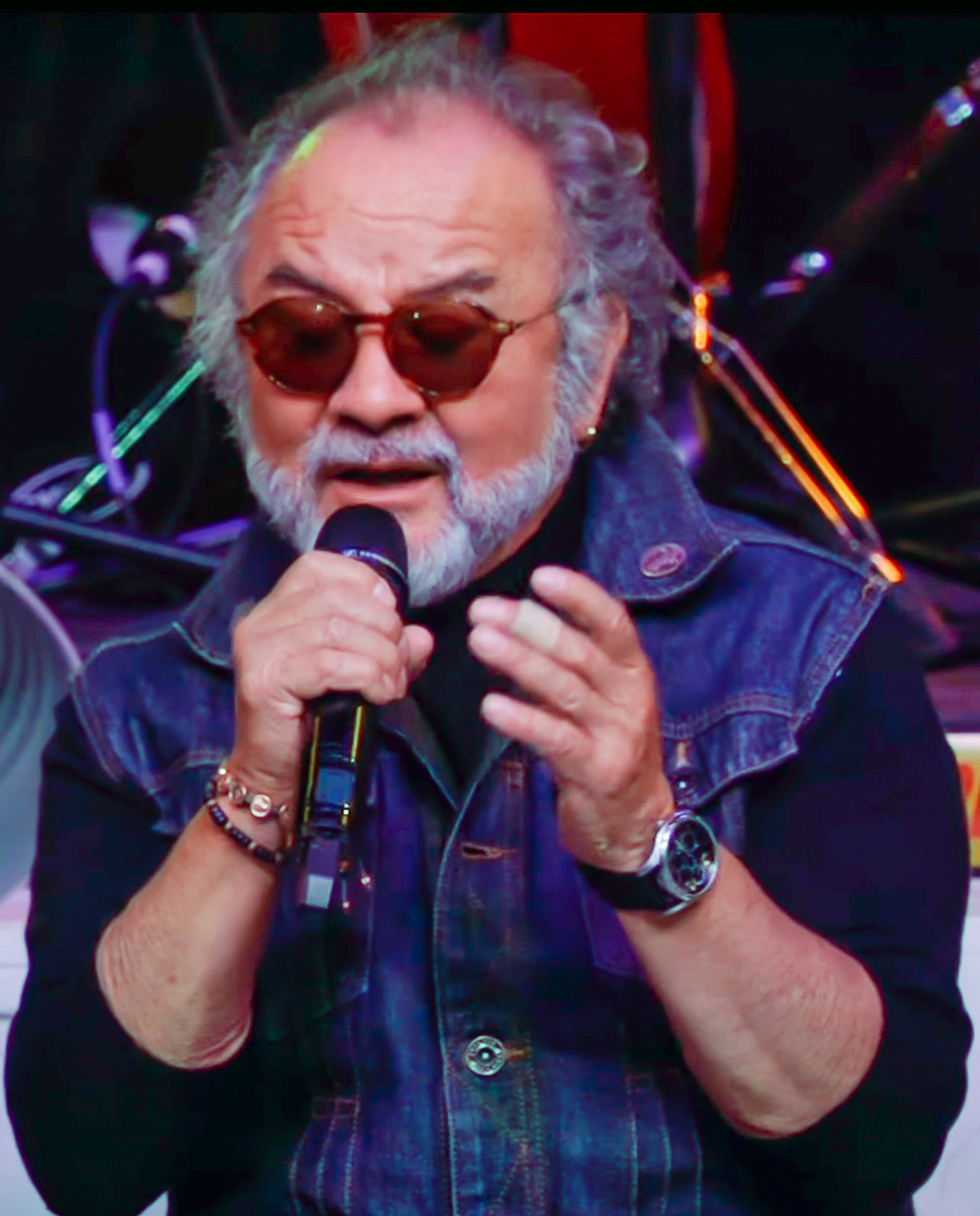
- Mora in 2020

Background information
- Born: Cesar Mora; October 2, 1954 (age 72); Cali, Colombia
- Genres: Rock, new wave, Latin, pop, classical
- Occupations: Musician, singer-songwriter, producer, actor
- Instrument: Vocals
- Years active: 1984–present
- Labels: Atoll Music; LoveCat Music
- Website: LoveCat Music artist bio

Cesar Mora (born Junio 25, 1956) is a leading musician and actor in Colombia. He was born in Cali, and later spent fourteen years as part of the famed Son Del Pueblo band.

Cesar composed the songs in the Colombian musical "Y Se Armo La Mojiganga" in which he also played the main character. His most recent albums are recorded with The Maria Canela Band under the musical direction of Luis Arroyo. He represented Colombia in the OTI Festival 1995 with the song "Sólo por hoy".

His most notable film role is Sargento Juvenal Garcia on El Zorro, la espada y la rosa. He won the Simón Bólivar Prize for Television in 1988 for his role in El Confesor.

== Discography ==
=== Albums ===
- Hacerlo Bien 2008

== Filmography ==
Television performance
Year	Title	Roles	Notes
1990	Música, maestro		
1990–1991	Calamar	Oliverio Cascales	
1992	La mujer doble		
1995	María Bonita	Jacinto Barba	
1995	Tiempos difíciles	Marcos el Tegua	
1997	Dios se lo pague	Barata	
1998	Perro amor	Himserlf	
2000	Pobre Pablo	José Ramón Alcalá	
2000	Alejo, la búsqueda del amor	Fidelina	
2001	Yo soy Betty, la fea	Antonio Sánchez	
2002	Milagros de amor	Cayetano	
2004	Todos quieren con Marilyn	Benito	
2005	Juegos prohibidos	Don Poncio	
2006	Hasta que la plata nos separe	Don Gastón Parra	
2007	El Zorro, la espada y la rosa	Sargento Juvenal García	
2008	Tiempo final	Pettete	Episode: "El secuestro"
2008	La traición	Guillermo Burke	
2008–2009	Sin senos no hay paraíso	Marcial Barrera	
2009–2010	Victorinos	Manolo Pérez	
2013	5 viudas suelta	Luis	
2013	Cumbia Ninja	Marcos Balza	
2014	El laberinto de Alicia	Ramón Garmendia	
2015	¿Quién mató a Patricia Soler?	Da Vinci	
2015	La esquina del diablo	Coronel Giraldo	
2016–2018	Sin senos sí hay paraíso	Marcial Barrera	Main role (seasons 1–2), guest role (season 3); 96 episodes
2018	María Magdalena	Herod Antipas	
2018	Loquito por ti	El Maestro Orestes Guzmán	6 episodes
2019	The Road to Love	Don Armando	
