= Forbidden Woman =

Colombian telenovela

- Spanish: La mujer prohibida
- Genre: Telenovela
- Created by: Dago García; Jhony Ortiz
- Written by: Jhony Ortiz; Héctor Chiquillo; Paola Casares
- Directed by: Mauricio Cruz Fortunato; Daniel Arenas Samudio
- Starring: Valerie Domínguez; Rodrigo Candamil; David Palacio
- Composer: Helman Moreno
- Country of origin: Colombia
- Original language: Spanish
- No. of seasons: 1
- No. of episodes: 61

Production
- Executive producer: Juan Carlos Villamizar
- Cinematography: Manuel Castañeda; Nicolás Escobar
- Editor: Wilmar Muñoz Garay
- Production company: Caracol Televisión

Original release
- Network: Netflix
- Release: 29 July 2026

Forbidden Woman (Spanish: La mujer prohibida) is a Colombian telenovela created by Dago García and Jhony Ortiz for Caracol Televisión. It premiered on Netflix on 29 July 2026. The telenovela stars Valerie Domínguez, Rodrigo Candamil and David Palacio.

== Cast ==
- Valerie Domínguez as Karen Arbeláez
- Rodrigo Candamil as Alexander Orduz
- David Palacio as Víctor Rodríguez
- Katherine Vélez as Amalia Rodríguez
- Fernando Solorzano as Fernán Caballero
- Katherine Escobar as Gisela Leal
- Angélica Blandón as Debora Lozano
- Brian Moreno as Daniel Caballero
- Camilo Sáenz as Esteban Arbeláez
- Valeria Galviz as Kitty Arbeláez
- Laura Junco as Doris Caballero
- Edwin Maya as Iván Caballero
- Camila Bordón as Betty
- Mario Espitia as Jimmy
- Eileen Roca as Lidia
- Isabel Gaona as María Torres
- Roger Moreno as Gerardo Torres
- Jhonatan Bedoya as Jair
- Michel Coy as Sergio Orduz Arbeláez

== Production ==
In December 2024, La mujer prohibida was announced as part of Caracol Televisión's programming for 2025. Filming began in May 2025.
