= El laberinto (TV series) =

- Genre: Drama
- Created by: Mauricio Miranda; Mauricio Navas
- Written by: Mauricio Miranda Darío Vanegas; Margarita María Londoño; Mauricio Guerra
- Directed by: Jaime Osorio Márquez; Juan Carlos Beltrán; Iván Gaona; José Luis Rugeles
- Starring: Róbinson Díaz; Sandra Reyes; Jorge Cao; Luis Fernando Hoyos
- Theme music composer: Jimmy Pulido
- Country of origin: Colombia
- Original language: Spanish

Production
- Producer: Diana Bustamante
- Production location: Colombia
- Cinematography: David Gallego, Alejandro Moreno
- Editor: Sebastián Hernández Z.
- Camera setup: Multicamera
- Running time: 45 minutes
- Production companies: Caracol TV; Sony Pictures Television

Original release
- Network: Caracol TV
- Release: January 10, 2012 – present

El laberinto is a 2012 Colombian drama produced by Caracol TV and Sony Pictures Television, broadcast on Caracol TV. It is the sequel to the successful 1997 weekly series La mujer del presidente.

== Plot ==
One day, Carlos Buendía finds his wife missing, his daughter in danger of death, about to be fired from his job, and fearing revenge from a mysterious woman because of something terrible which happened 15 years before.

== Cast ==
- Róbinson Díaz as Carlos Alberto Buendía
- Sandra Reyes as Adriana Guerrero
- Luis Fernando Hoyos as Ernesto
- Claudia Moreno as Bárbara
- Jorge Cao as Francisco de Paula Acero
- Roberto Cano as Andrés Acero
- Alma Rodríguez as Robin
- Adelaida López as Verónica Buendía

== Episodes ==
1. Enemigos del pasado llegan para cobrar venganza (2012-01-10; rating: 9.6)
