= Carlos Manuel Vesga =

Colombian actor

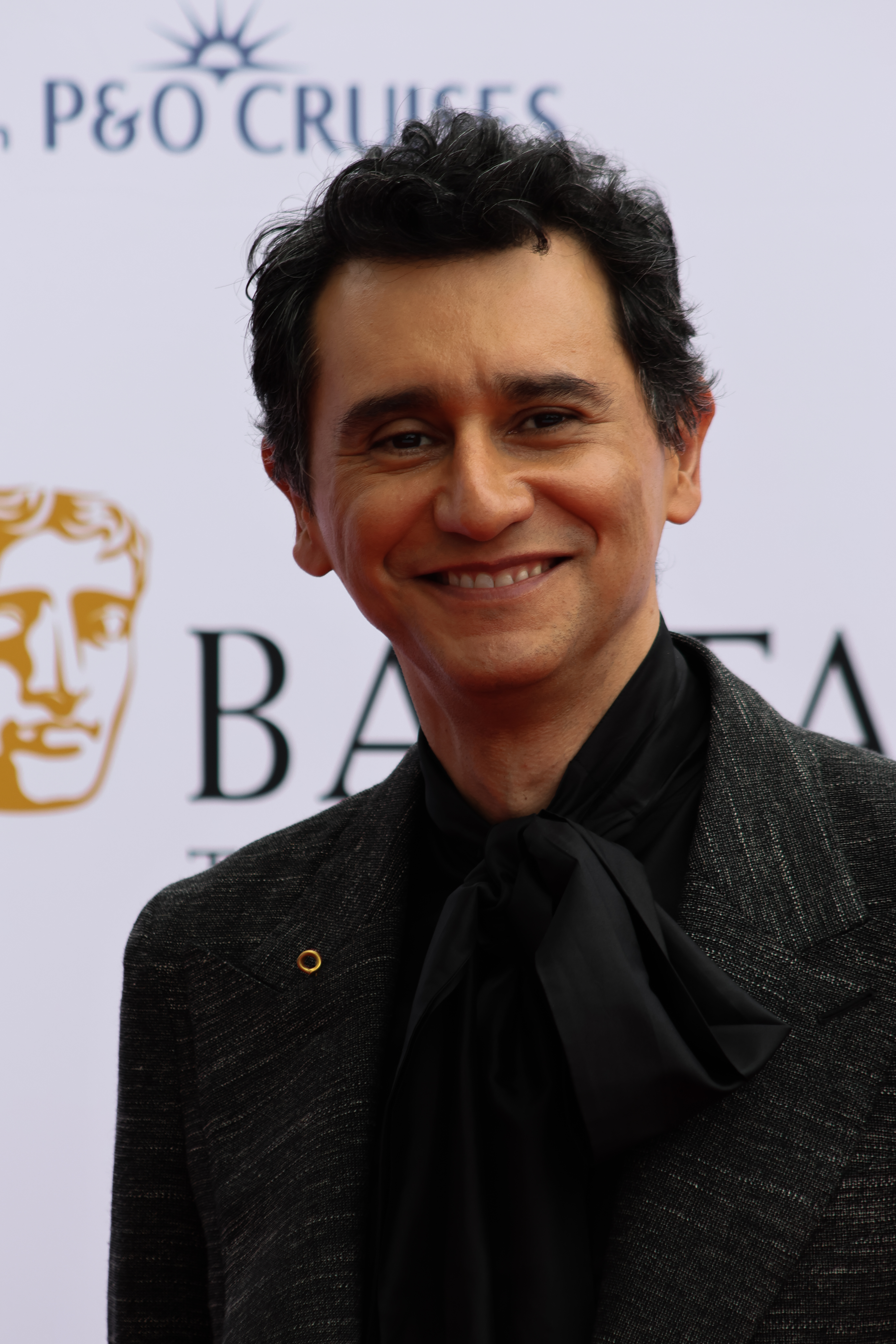
- Vesga at the 2026 British Academy Television Awards
- Born: Carlos Manuel Vesga Sánchez; January 30, 1976 (age 50); Bogotá, Colombia
- Occupation: Actor
- Years active: 2000–present
- Spouse: Jimena Durán (m. 2013)

Carlos Manuel Vesga Sánchez (born January 30, 1976), also credited as Carlos-Manuel Vesga, is a Colombian theater, film, and television actor.

He is known for his role in the 2010 Colombian telenovela Amor sincero, playing Samuel Medina, as well as in the 2013 series La prepago, where he played the role of Alejandro Sanjuán. Since 2025, he has starred in the Apple TV series Pluribus as Manousos Oviedo.

== Early life and education ==
Carlos Manuel Vesga Sánchez was born in Bogotá, Colombia. During his youth, he created his own rock band.

He initially studied architecture at Pontifica Universidad Javeriana. Upon completing his architecture degree, he moved to New York City to study acting at the Lee Strasberg Theatre and Film Institute. Although trained in "The Method", Vesga has stated in interviews that he views acting more as a "serious game" rather than a search for absolute emotional truth, diverging slightly from strict Strasberg techniques.

== Career ==
=== Early work and breakthrough ===
Vesga's career began when he returned to Colombia and was cast in the telenovela Pobre Pablo (2000). He steadily built a reputation as a character actor, avoiding the typical heartthrob ("galán") stereotype, while securing significant roles.

His major breakthrough came in 2010 with the hit series Amor sincero, a biopic of the singer Marbelle. Vesga played Samuel Medina, the protagonist's father. The role was a cultural phenomenon in Colombia; despite playing a father figure rather than a romantic lead, the character became incredibly popular with female audiences for his portrayal of an ideal husband. For this performance, he won the India Catalina Award for Best Leading Actor in a Telenovela in 2011.

=== Villain roles and international success ===
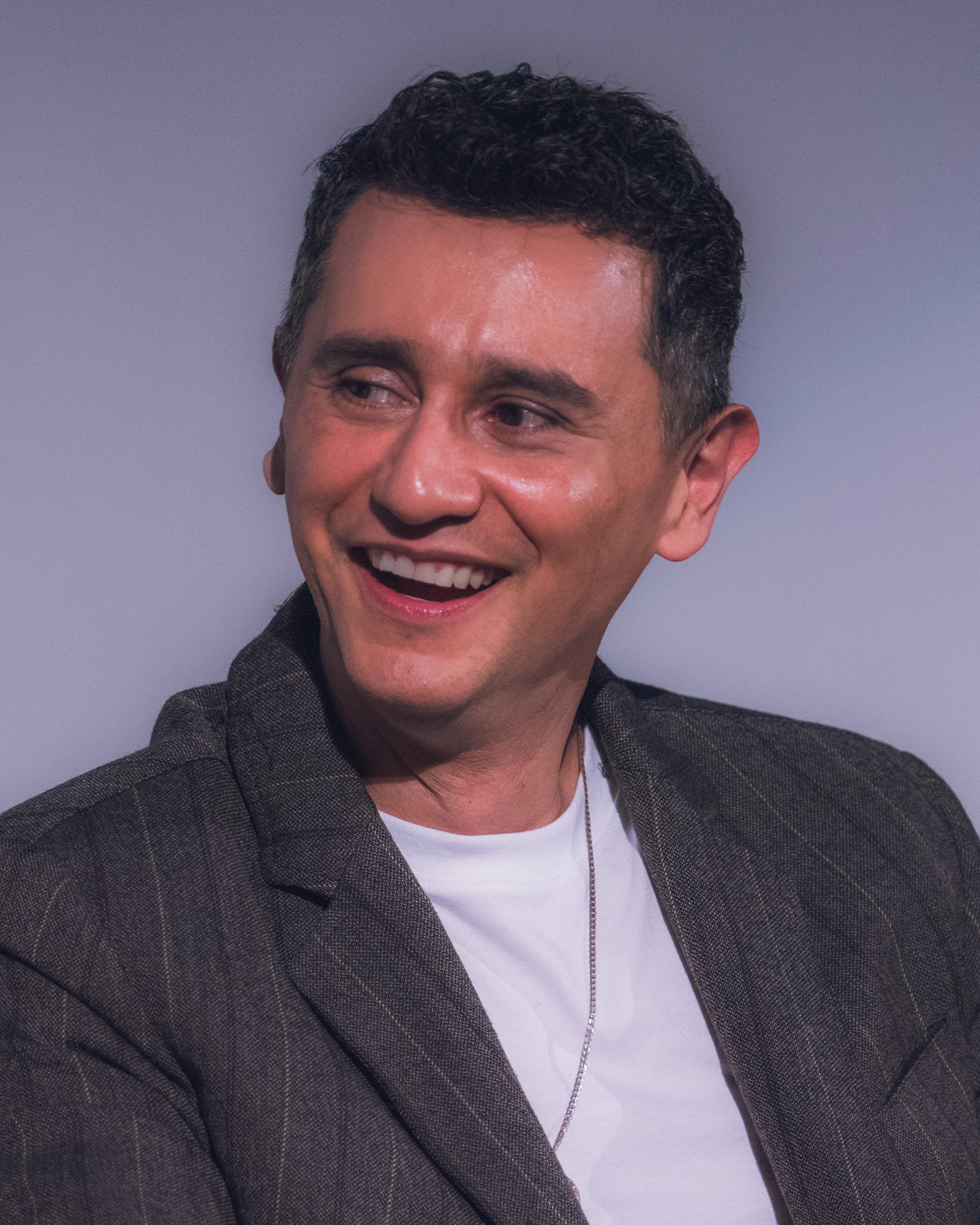
Vesga in 2025, promoting Pluribus

Vesga transitioned to playing antagonists, gaining critical acclaim for his "hated" villain roles. Notable antagonistic performances include Alejandro Sanjuán in La prepago (2013) and the sadistic "Picasso" in El Bronx (2019).

In 2024, he achieved widespread recognition for playing two major villains simultaneously on Colombian television: Alfredo Azcárate in Devuélveme la vida and Francisco "El Flaco" Marulanda in the Netflix survival thriller The Hijacking of Flight 601 (Secuestro del vuelo 601). The latter became one of Netflix's most-watched non-English series globally that year.

In 2025, it was announced that Vesga would be joining the cast of Pluribus, a series by Breaking Bad creator Vince Gilligan. He plays the role of Manousos Oviedo, one of the few people immune to an alien virus that has overtaken the world, who refuses contact with the infected.

== Personal life ==
Vesga is married to Colombian actress Jimena Durán. The couple met while studying at the same university, though they did not begin a relationship until years later when they reconnected in the acting industry. They married in 2013.

== Acting credits ==
=== Television ===
Year	Title	Role
2000–2002	Pobre Pablo	Wilson Casilima
2006–2007	Floricienta	"Pipo"
2007	Mujeres asesinas	Diego (Episode: "Lucia, la memoriosa")
2007–2008	Pura sangre	Isidro Chaparro
2009	Las trampas del amor	Marlon Romano
2010	Amor sincero	Samuel Medina Uribe
2010–2011	La Pola	Colonel José Ignacio Rodríguez 'Mosca'
2011	El man es Germán	Felipe "Pipe" (Episode 29, Season 2)
2012	Escobar: el patrón del mal	Carlos Mauro Hoyos
2012–2013	Corazones blindados	Sub-lieutenant Vicente Yáñez
2013	Tres Caínes	Hernan Dario Henao 'HH'
2013	La prepago	Alejandro Sanjuan
2013	Allá te espero	Álvaro Jaramillo
2013–2014	Los graduados	Guillermo 'Guille' Aldana
2015	Laura, la santa colombiana	
2015–2016	Celia	Billy
2016	Contra el tiempo	Roberto Cuervo
2016–2017	La ley del corazón	Óscar Jaramillo
2016–2017	Las Vega's	German Ordóñez
2017	La nocturna	José Osorio
2018	Nadie me quita lo bailao	Daniel
2018–2019	María Magdalena	Umit
2019	Tormenta de amor	El Naño Ovalle
2019	Córdova 'un general llamado arrojo'	Simón Bolívar
2019	De levante	Nicolas
2019	El Bronx	Marlon Galeano 'Picasso'
2019–2020	El general Naranjo	Sergeant Andrade
2020	La de troya 2	Lorenzo - Producer
2020	Operación Pacífico	Michael
2021	El Cartel de los Sapos: el origen	Emanuel Villegas Ulloa
2021	Café con aroma de mujer	Danilo
2022	A grito herido	Bernardo
2022	Noticia de un secuestro	César Gaviria
2024	Secuestro del vuelo 601	Francisco "El Flaco" Marulanda
2024	Devuélveme la vida	Alfredo Azcárate Valencia (young)
2025–present	Pluribus	Manousos Oviedo
2026	Palacio	Luis Alfonso Plazas Vega

=== Film ===
Year	Title	Role
2005	El trato	
2006	Soñar no cuesta nada	Justo Perlaza
2013	Roa	Vicente
2015	Uno al año no hace daño 2	Germán
2016	Rebel Pope	Young Jesuit
2017	Loving Pablo	La Plaga
2018	La pena máxima	Poncho
2018	Tuya, mía… te la apuesto	Poncho
2023	Perder es ganar un poco	Armando
2023	El yuppie y el Guiso	Camilo Mallarino / Edgar López
2025	Donde tu quieras	Agustin

=== Theater ===
Year	Title	Role	Note
2019	La verdad es un juego de mentiras	Pablo	National Theater

== Music ==
Year	Band	Song
1995	El Jardín de Daniela	"San Pedro"
1996	El Jardín de Daniela	"Azul"

== Awards and nominations ==
Year	Award	Category	Work	Result
2011	TVyNovelas Awards	Best Supporting Actor (Series)	Amor sincero	Nominated
2011	India Catalina Awards	Best Lead Actor (Telenovela)	Amor sincero	Won
2013	India Catalina Awards	Best Supporting Actor (Telenovela)	Corazones blindados	Nominated
2020	India Catalina Awards	Best Supporting Actor (Telenovela or Series)	Córdova, un general llamado arrojo	Nominated
2026	Primetime Emmy Awards	Outstanding Supporting Actor in a Drama Series	Pluribus	Nominated
