= Mijail Mulkay =

Cuban actor (born 1974)

- Born: Mijail Mulkay Bordon Perdomo; April 20, 1974 (age 52); Havana, Cuba
- Occupation: Actor

Mijail Mulkay Bordon (born April 20, 1974 in Cuba) is a Cuban actor.

== Television ==
- CELIA: La vida de Celia Cruz - Tico Fuentes (Tito Puente) (2015)
- Voltea pa' que te Enamores - Mateo (2014)
- En otra piel - Soler Hernández (2014)
- Cosita Linda' - Lisandro (2013)
- "El Clon (2010) .... Mohammed
- "Los caballeros las prefieren brutas" (2010) .... Rodrigo Florez
- "Victorinos" (2009) TV series .... Adopted Victorino Pérez
- "La quiero a morir" (2008) TV series .... Rito Sansón
- "La ex" .... Leonardo Guáqueta
- "Aunque estés lejos" - Lazaro
- "La Mujer En El Espejo" - Camilo
- "Entre ciclones" 2003
- "Hacerse el sueco" 2001- Cuba
- "Miradas" 2001- Spain
- T"Lista de espera" ... Manolo
- Candela (2000)
- "Entre Mamparas" (1996) TV series
