= ¿Quién amará a María? =

Colombian television series

¿Quién amará a María? ("Who will love María?") is a Colombian telenovela produced and broadcast by Caracol TV, since 25 March 2008, starring Katherine Porto, Nicolás Rincón, Gustavo Ángel, Didier Van der Hove, Jorge López and Santiago Alarcón. Due to poor ratings, it ended abruptly on 2 June 2008.

== Plot ==
The telenovela deals with a woman, Marcia, who has been betrayed by her husband and decides to remake her life, looking for "the perfect" man and the man who she wants to be the father of her children (her biggest dream is to have a child). Marcia decides to "become" four different women, all of them called María (María Daisy, María Angelica, María Consuelo and María Magdalena). Each one of them manages to conquer a man, thus Marcia ends up dating four men simultaneously.
