= A Day Like No Other =

2026 Spanish-Colombian television series

- Spanish: Aquel
- Genre: Biographical; Drama
- Written by: Ignacio del Moral; Paloma Rando; Adrià P. Xancó
- Directed by: Tito López Amado; Javier Pulido; Beatriz Sanchís
- Starring: Javier Morgade; Carlos Santos; Francesco Carril; Natalia Varela; Pepa Aniorte; Manolo Caro
- Countries of origin: Spain; Colombia
- Original language: Spanish
- No. of episodes: 8

Production
- Producer: José Manuel Lorenzo
- Production companies: DLO Producciones; Caracol Televisión

Original release
- Network: Netflix
- Release: 9 October 2026

A Day Like No Other (Spanish: Aquel) is an Spanish-Colombian biographical drama television series about the singer Raphael. Comprising eight episodes, The series was release on Netflix on 9 October 2026.

== Premise ==
The series traces Raphael's life from his childhood in post-war Spain through five decades of international success, covering his career, personal relationships and difficulties.

== Cast ==
- Javier Morgade as the young Raphael
- Carlos Santos as the adult Raphael
- Francesco Carril
- Natalia Varela
- Pepa Aniorte
- Manolo Caro

== Production ==
Netflix announced the series and its cast in July 2025, when filming was already under way. It is directed by Tito López Amado, Javier Pulido and Beatriz Sanchís from scripts by Ignacio del Moral, Paloma Rando and Adrià P. Xancó, and produced by DLO Producciones with Caracol Televisión; José Manuel Lorenzo is the producer.

Filming began in June 2025 and took place in Madrid, Las Vegas, Moscow, Paris and Acapulco. Raphael said that recording had started in June and that he was pleased with the early results.

== Release ==
Netflix set the release date for 9 October 2026 in July of that year, and released a trailer in September 2026.
