= La prepago =

2013 Colombian television series

- Genre: Telenovela; Romance; Drama
- Created by: Jorge Franco
- Written by: Carlos Duplat; Luz Marina Santofimio; Jorge Franco
- Directed by: Carlos Gaviria; Israel Sánchez; Rodrigo Lalinde
- Starring: Lilo de la Vega; Andrés Sandoval; Julián Román; Natalia Durán; Luis Eduardo Arango; Katherine Porto
- Opening theme: Doble Vida by Vicky Echeverri
- Country of origin: Colombia
- Original language: Spanish
- No. of episodes: 61

Production
- Executive producer: Juan Pablo Posada
- Production locations: Bogotá; Cali; Cartagena de Indias
- Running time: 42-45 minutes
- Production company: Sony Pictures Television

Original release
- Network: RCN Televisión
- Release: June 19 – October 31, 2013

Related
- La Traicionera; La tempestad; Amor en Custodia (Colombia)

La prepago is a Colombian telenovela produced by Sony Pictures Television for RCN Televisión, based on the popular book written by Carlos Duplat, Las memorias de Andrea.

Lilo de la Vega and Andrés Sandoval star as the protagonists, while Julián Román, Alejandro Aguilar and Luis Eduardo Arango star as the antagonists.

== Cast ==
=== Main cast ===
- Lilo de la Vega - Ana Lucia Barrera / Andrea
- Andrés Sandoval - David
- Julián Román - Wilson
- Natalia Durán - Carolina
- Juliana Robledo - Paola Cabal

=== Recurring cast ===
- Luis Eduardo Arango - Reinaldo “Don Rey”
- Katherine Porto - Erika
- Javier Delgiudice - Dr Valencia Guerra
- Natalia Ramírez - Maria del Pilar
- Alejandro Aguilar - Jimmy
- Greeicy Rendón - Johana
- Carmenza González - Ana de Barrera
- Diego León Hoyos - Misael Barrera
- Sofia Ortiz - Estefania
- Didier Van Der Hove - Patrick Mackensie
- Pedro Pallares - Moritz Levy
- Daniel Rengifo - Faustino "Tino" Bejarano
- Giancarlo Mendoza - Marco
- Sergio Gonzalez - Samuel "Tio Sam" Bejarano
- Victoria Hernández - Coronel Alzate
- Ilja Rosendahl - Jean Louis
- Alejandra Franco - La Mona
- Jordana Issa - Laura
- Nicolás Nocceti - Roberto Vasco
