= Carolina Acevedo =

Colombian actress (born 1979)

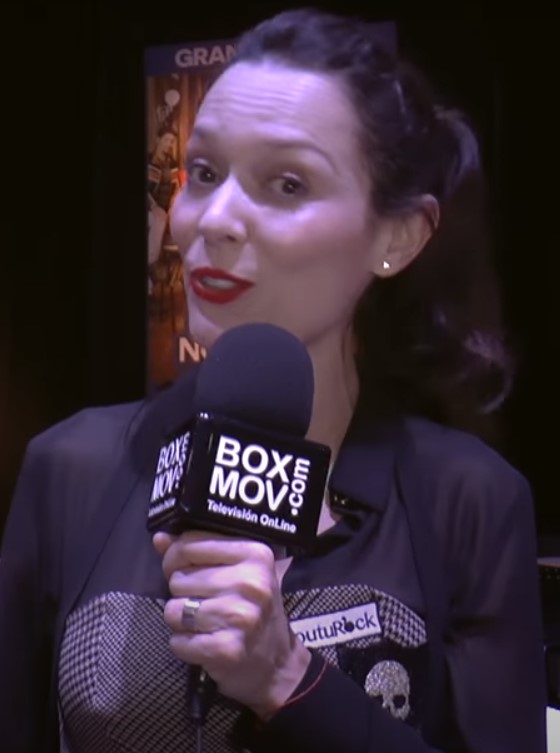
- Born: October 7, 1982 (age 43); Ibagué, Colombia
- Occupation: Actress
- Years active: 1993-present
- Height: 1.72 m (5 ft 8 in)
- Spouse: Roberto Cano (July 20, 2002-2004)

Carolina Acevedo Rojas (October 7, 1979) born in Ibagué, is a Colombian actress and presenter. She recognized for her starring roles in productions such as De Pies a Cabeza, La madre, Tabú, Pobre Pablo and Newly Rich, Newly Poor. She won MasterChef Celebrity season 5 in Colombia

== Early life ==
She was born on October 7, 1979 of Ricardo Acevedo and Silvia Rojas. Her father, Ricardo is an surgeon who specialized on maxillofacial and a colonel in the National Police of Colombia. Her mother, Silvia is a cosmetologist.

== Career ==
Acevedo began her acting career in 1993 with a role in De Pies a Cabeza. She returned to act as supporting character in La madre in 1998 and 1999 in Tabú. In 2000, she starred as the protagonist in Pobre Pablo. She starred in two telenovela in 2003 which is in No renuncies Salomé as a lead role along with Marlon Moreno and in Un ángel llamado Azul. On 2004, she made a brief appearance on Francisco el Matemático.

For her acting as Rosmery Peláez in Newly Rich, Newly Poor, she won Best Lead Actress in a Telenovela at the TVyNovelas Awards Colombia on 2008. Two years later, she starred in Mariana & Scarlett where she becames main lead with Carolina Guerra and Patrick Delmas.

She also won the MasterChef Celebrity season 5 in Colombia on 2023 defeating finalist such as Adrian Parada, Marianela González and Daniela Tapia.

== Personal life ==
She also has a sister named Marcela Avedo that was born in 1979 who is an artist. She was married to Roberto Cano from 2002 to 2004. On 2010, she married with Salomón Korn, Colombian businessman and have one son.

== Filmography ==
Title	Year	Role	Notes
1993	De Pies a Cabeza	Violeta Quesada Hurtado	
1998	La madre	Catalina Bernal	
1999	Tabú		
2000	Pobre Pablo	Maria alcala	
2003	No renuncies Salomé	Salomé	
2003	Un ángel llamado Azul	Anabella	
2004	Francisco el Matemático	Laura	
2008	Newly Rich, Newly Poor	Rosmery Peláez	
2010	Mariana & Scarlett	Mariana	
