= Gil Rabbi =

Israeli technology entrepreneur

- גיל רבי
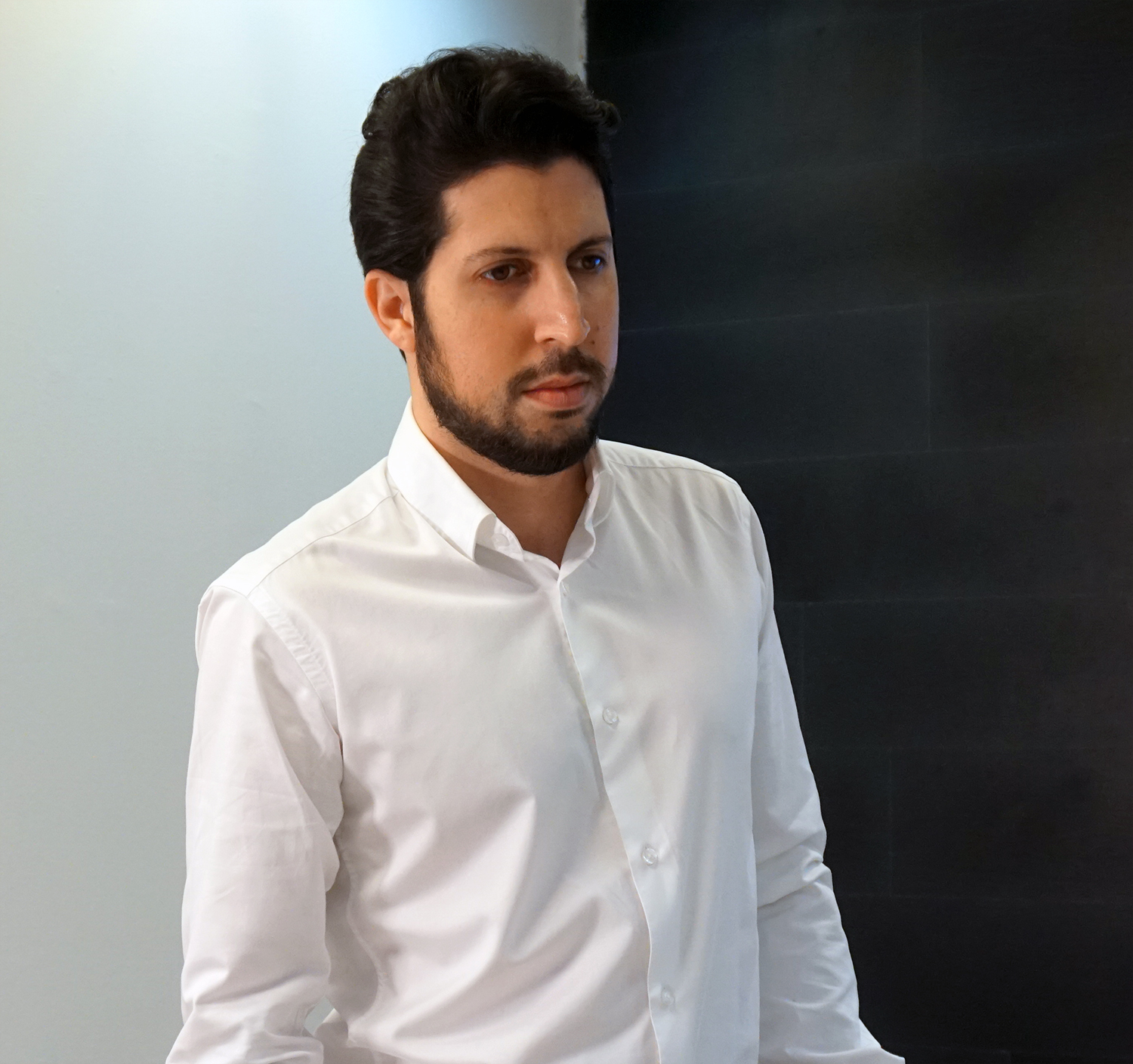
- Born: Ramat Gan, Israel
- Education: Blich High School

Gil Rabbi (Hebrew: גיל רבי) is an Israeli technology entrepreneur.

== Career ==
In 2005, Rabbi founded Rabbi Interactive Agency, a technology agency focused on engagement and interactive products.

In late 2013, Rabbi founded the start-up company No-Show which developed a technology that maintains privacy and hides the caller's ID of an incoming call. In the same year, Rabbi developed the application and technology of the "Rising Star" TV show, through which viewers voted and chose singer Netta Barzilai to represent Israel at the 2018 Eurovision, the singer Kobi Marimi for the 2019 Eurovision, and the singer Eden Alene for 2020.

In November 2014, an application developed by Rabbi, in collaboration with the Keshet franchise, for the interactive TV game show TOUCH was sold to the Caracol television network in Colombia and was aired live every evening on prime time.

The startup Storycards, founded in 2018 by Rabbi and Keshet Broadcasting, was transferred to the full control of Rabbi in June 2020 and began to expand into the international arena.

In 2019, Rabbi participated for the projects by European Broadcasting Union. In April 2019, Rabbi was invited to serve as a mentor and judge at Euro-hack. Following that event, Rabbi founded a start-up company named Crowdr with two teenagers.
