= La gloria de Lucho =

Colombian telenovela

- Genre: Telenovela
- Created by: Juan Andrés Granados; Gerardo Pinzón
- Written by: Juan Andrés Granados; Gerardo Pinzón
- Directed by: Olga Lucía Rodríguez; Luis Carlos Sierra
- Starring: Enrique Carriazo; Verónica Orozco; Juliana Velásquez; Laura Torres; Carlos Camacho
- Opening theme: "La gloria de Lucho" by César Mora, Alfredo de la Fe and Danny Rosales
- Country of origin: Colombia
- Original language: Spanish
- No. of episodes: 80

Production
- Executive producer: Yalile Giordanelli
- Production location: Bogotá
- Camera setup: Multi-camera
- Production companies: Sony Pictures Television; Teleset

Original release
- Network: Caracol Televisión
- Release: February 11 – June 7, 2019

Related
- Loquito por ti; Un bandido honrado

La gloria de Lucho (English title: Big Steps) is a Colombian telenovela written by Juan Andrés Granados and produced by Sony Pictures Television and Teleset for Caracol Televisión, based on the life of ex-councilman Luis Eduardo Díaz. Its official premiere was on February 11, 2019 and stars Enrique Carriazo and Verónica Orozco. The show ended on June 7, 2019.

== Plot ==
The real-life story of Luis Eduardo Diaz, a controversial bootblack, who went from having nothing to having it all, after winning the elections for an important political position in his city.

== Cast ==
- Enrique Carriazo as Luis Eduardo "Lucho" Díaz Chaparro
- Verónica Orozco as Gloria Vargas de Díaz
- Juliana Velásquez as Leidy Díaz Vargas
- Laura Torres as Marcela Díaz Vargas
- Carlos Camacho as Rubén Alfonso Murcia
- Luis Eduardo Arango as Everardo Porras
- Andrea Guzmán as Graciela Blanco
- Edgardo Román as Gonzalo Díaz
- Natalia Giraldo as Rosalba Vargas
- Constanza Gutiérrez as Doña Zenaida
- Alejandra Lara as Nena Quintero
- Carolina Vivas as Mireya de Díaz Gaitán
- Margarita Reyes as Milena "La Guari"
- Karen Sierra González as Doris
- Juan Carlos Messier as Victor Prieto
- Kathy Sáenz as Patricia Valencia
- Santiago Gómez as Wilson Prieto
- Gabriel Piñeres as Lucho Díaz (boy)
- Andrés Castañeda as Lucho Díaz (young)
- Isabella Sierra as Gloria Vargas (girl)
- Katherine Escobar Farfán as Gloria Vargas (young)
- María Irene Toro as Mireya de Díaz Gaitán (adult)
- Catherine Mira as Rosalba Vargas (adult)
- Erick Rodríguez as Rubén Murcia (young)
- Morris Bravo as Arnoldo Suárez
- Laureano Sanchez as Jaime Monroy (el perito)
- Alden Rojas as Gonzalo Díaz (adult)
- Paola Benjumea as Zenaida Blanco (adult)
- María Camila Porras as Milena "La Guari" (young)
- Andrés Felipe Torres as Fredy Velandia
- David Guerrero as Triviño
- Liliana Escobar Noriega as Yolanda
- Daniel Rengifo as Brayan
- Oscar Salazar as Hector
- Orlando Valenzuela as Pote Gómez
- ‘Kiko’ Rubiano as Bonilla
- Pedro Mogollón as Ernesto Salazar
- Felipe Arcila as José
- Walter Luengas as Dr. Faldiño
