= Loquito por ti =

- Genre: Telenovela
- Written by: Carlos Fernández Soto; Ana Fernanda Martínez
- Directed by: Andrés Biermann; Jaime Rayo
- Creative director: Guarnizo y Lizarralde
- Starring: Mariana Gómez; Variel Sánchez; Sebastián Carvajal
- Theme music composer: Ángel Aníbal Rosado
- Opening theme: "Cariñito" by Variel Sánchez and Mariana Gómez
- Country of origin: Colombia
- Original language: Spanish
- No. of episodes: 80

Production
- Executive producer: Manuel Peñaloza
- Production location: Colombia
- Camera setup: Multi-camera

Original release
- Network: Caracol Televisión
- Release: 10 October 2018 – 8 February 2019

Related
- La Reina del Flow; La gloria de Lucho

Loquito por ti (English: Crazy About You), is a Colombian telenovela that premiered on Caracol Televisión on 10 October 2018. The telenovela is based on the life of Colombian tropical music singers, Rodolfo Aicardi, and Gustavo "El Loko" Quintero.

== Plot ==
The series revolves around the life of Camilo and Juancho, two friends who work in the Maestro Guzmán's orchestra, both share the dream of one day becoming the most recognized musicians in the tropical genre. In this long journey to fulfill their dream, they meet Daniela, a woman of good economic position who wants to be famous and live music as they do. Daniela will have to hide from her family that she is part of a musical orchestra, and Camilo and Juancho that she is from a family of high social class. But everything gets complicated when Camilo and Juancho fall in love with Daniela, that's when their friendship and dreams of being famous will be truncated by the love of a woman.

== Cast ==
- Mariana Gómez as Daniela Botero
- Variel Sánchez as Camilo Arango
- Sebastián Carvajal as Juan Nepomuseno "Juancho" Argote
- María Camila Giraldo como Estela Rendón "Estelita"
- Danielle Arciniegas as Janeth Arango
- Pillao Rodriguez as German
- Linda Lucía Callejas as Maruja de Arango
- Luces Velásquez as Josefina
- Sebastián Giraldo as Charlie
- Carla Giraldo as Rosario
- Julián Caicedo as Jorge Eliécer Gómez Espitia "Machorro"
- Sebastián Boscán as Nicolás Botero
- Freddy Ordóñez as Sacerdote Facundo
- Ricardo Mejía as Héctor Jaramillo
- Juan Carlos Coronel as Doctor
- Daniela Tapia as Tamara
- Kimberly Reyes as Perla
- Patricia Ercole as Rebeca
- Carmenza Cossio as Julia Rendón
- César Mora as El Maestro Orestes Guzmán
- José Rojas as Rafael Dangond
- Cristian Villamil as El Choper
- Anddy Caicedo as Romero
- Martha Restrepo as Bárbara Uribe
- Lina Cardona as Silvia
- Quique Mendoza as Arturo Vidal
- Henry Montealegre as Luis
- Alfredo Gutiérrez as Maestro Migue
- Santiago Moure as Polidoro Uribe
- Edinson Gil as Henry
