= The Road to Love (TV series) =

Colombian comedy telenovela

- Genre: Telenovela
- Directed by: Luis Orjuela; Carlos Mario Urrea
- Country of origin: Colombia
- Original language: Spanish
- No. of seasons: 1
- No. of episodes: 63

Production
- Executive producer: Juan Carlos Villamizar

Original release
- Network: Caracol Televisión
- Release: 4 December 2019

The Road to Love (Spanish: Los Briceño), is a Colombian comedy telenovela produced by Juan Carlos Villamizar for Caracol Televisión. The series production began in February 2019, and is recorded in 4K Ultra-high-definition television. The production was presented at the 2019 LA Screenings, and is stars Katherine Escobar Farfán, Juan Manuel Restrepo, Mario Espitia, César Mora, Carmenza González, José Daniel Cristancho, Maria Laura Quintero, and Toto Vega.

The first season of the series became available for streaming on 4 December 2019 on Netflix.

== Plot ==
The Briceño are a nuclear family of truck drivers. Armando and Lucía are the aged parents, and Cecilia, Rigoberto (known as "Toronja"), Breiner and Darío are their adult children. Fabián, known as "Peluche", is an adoptive son. Armando wins a truck race with Cecilia as his co-pilot. In doing so Cecilia reveals that her brothers taught her to drive trucks, which Armando disapproves of. She runs away with the truck, unaware that the prize had been stored in it. Tulio gave pursuit, as the Briceño had a monetary debt and he intended to confiscate their truck. Tulio gets the truck and, unknown to the family, gets the prize money as well. The initial plots are about the attempts by the Briceño to get their truck back.

Cecilia discovered that she was pregnant. Armando banished her from the family home for getting pregnant out of wedlock. She leaves with Peluche to inform Samuel of his impending fatherhood, only to find that he was getting married. Samuel, however, finds out about this, causing conflicts with his wife and Cecilia. Rigoberto falls in love with Amalfi, the wife of rival trucker Octavio, and both start singing as a duet in secrecy. Breiner, an internet celebrity, tries to conceal his real life circumstance from a rich girl that likes him. Darío engages in several open relations, with Pilar falling in love with him anyway and getting jealous of the others. She gets pregnant and then hates him because he was with someone else when she had a miscarriage. Armando gets his hand damaged by age-related injuries, but ignores the doctor's orders to avoid driving.

== Cast ==
- Katherine Escobar Farfán as La Chiquis AK cecilia
- Juan Manuel Restrepo as Fabián Molano "Peluche"
- Mario Espitia as Samuel
- César Mora as Don Armando
- Carmenza González as Lucía
- José Daniel Cristancho as Toronja
- Mayra Luna Uribe as Ilse
- María Laura Quintero as Tatiana Gerlein
- Toto Vega as Don Tulio
- Camilo Amores as Breiner
- Linda Lucía Callejas as Doña Amalfi
- Melissa Bermúdez Soler as Majo
- Tania Fálquez as Neiva
- Santiago Rodríguez as Don Carlos
- Lorna Cepeda as Minerva
