= Katherine Escobar =

Colombian model and actress

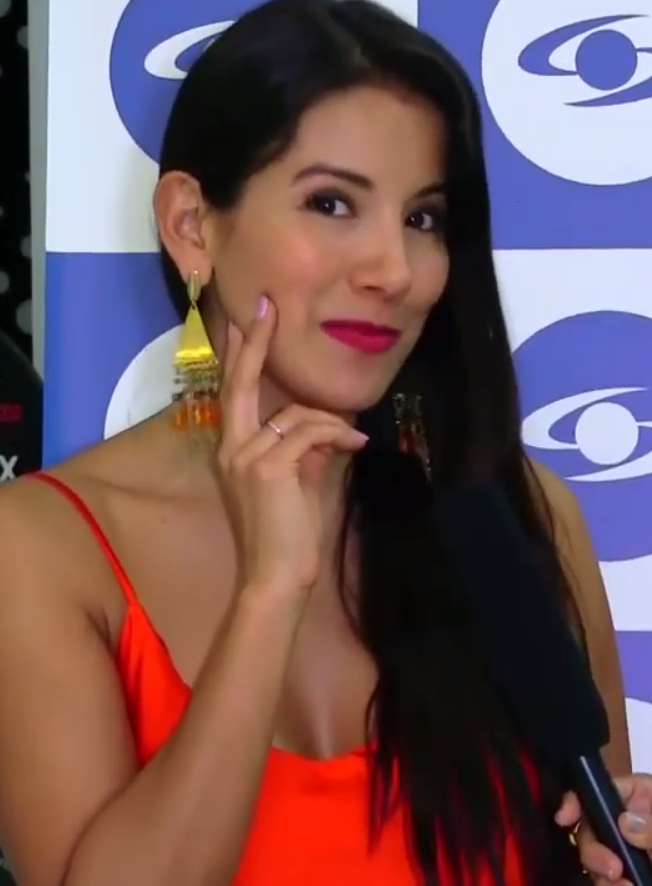
- Born: Katherine Escobar; November 14, 1982 (age 43); Cali, Colombia.
- Occupations: Actress, Model
- Spouse: Rafael Henríquez (2007-2010) Tommy Vázquez 2010 present
- Children: Sofia Henriquez, Pablo Vazquéz
- Website: Website

Katherine Escobar is a Colombian model and actress best known as Olivia on the Mafia Dolls telenovela, also for her work in novels such as New Rich, New Poor and I Want to Die Like Catherine..

== Filmography ==
Title	Year	Type	Character
Cuando vivas conmigo	2016	TV series	Armida Lopez
La Mariposa	2012–2013	TV series	Azucena Altagracia
La guerra del Cartel	2011–2012	TV series	Michelle Montero
Salvador de Mujeres	2010–2011	TV series	Isabel Hernandez
Las muñecas de la mafia	2009–2019	TV series	Olivia Rengifo
La quiero a morir (telenovela)	2008	TV series	Katerine Belalcazar
Nuevo rico, nuevo pobre	2007	Movie	Nury
Asi es la vida ''La hija de el entrenador''	2007	TV series	Lisa
Merlina Mujer divina	2006	TV series	Leticia Pelaez
Floricienta	2007	TV series	Adriana
Todos quieren con Marilyn	2004	TV series	Liliana Torres
Un ángel llamado Azul	2003	TV series	Blanca
Milagros de amor	2002	TV series	Luisa Fernanda Salazar
Amor sin remedio	2001	TV series	Noelia
