= La quiero a morir (TV series) =

- Genre: Telenovela / Drama
- Written by: Luis Felipe Salamanca; Andrés Huertas; Mauricio Barreto; Sandra Morato
- Directed by: Juan Carlos Vásquez; Unai Amuchastegui
- Starring: Ana María Trujillo; Mijail Mulkay; Majida Issa; Luigi Aicardi; Ana María Kamper
- Theme music composer: Irene Salamanca, Alejandro Escallón
- Opening theme: La quiero a morir (David Castro)
- Composer: Francis Cabrel
- Country of origin: Colombia
- Original language: Spanish
- No. of episodes: 120 x 1 h

Production
- Executive producer: William Correal
- Producer: Luis Felipe Salamanca
- Production location: Bogotá
- Cinematography: Carlos Gómez, Diego López
- Editor: Paco González
- Camera setup: Multicamera
- Running time: 25 minutes

Original release
- Network: Caracol TV
- Release: July 16, 2008 – July 8, 2009

La quiero a morir (Spanish: Love her to death) is a 2008 Colombian telenovela produced and broadcast by Caracol TV.

== Plot ==
The telenovela starts with the celebration of the 20th anniversary of Manuela Sáenz's (Ana María Trujillo) and Germán Rico's (Luigy Aicardi) marriage; they have two daughters, Andrea (Margarita Muñoz) and Juliana (Luz del Sol Neisa). As the party goes on, Germán and his secret lover, Catalina (Martha Restrepo) —who turns out to be Manuela's best friend—, decide to escape together. When Manuela realizes this, it is too late: Germán has abandoned and ruined her and their daughters, since he had some debts and made obscure movements with the finances of the company he was running.

Manuela decides to rebuild her life. She meets Sansón (Mijaíl Mulkay), who comes to take possession of one of the houses he bought from Germán, while still owing him. This is why Manuela ends up sharing the house with Sansón's family. Manuela and Sansón fall in love with each other, but he has a relationship with Yuri (Majida Issa), who does everything she can to keep him by her side and push him away from Manuela.

== Cast ==
- Mijail Mulkay as Rito Sansón Pulido
- Ana María Trujillo as Manuela Sáenz
- Margarita Muñoz as Andrea Rico
- Majida Issa as Yuri Liliana Consuelo
- Luigi Aycardi as Germán Rincón
- Ana María Kamper as Elisa
- Luz del Sol as Juliana Rico
- Margarita Ortega as Viviana
- Astrid Hernández as Policarpa Pola Saavedra
- Ana Soler as Lucrecia Sáenz
- Sebastián Caicedo as Camilo Mondragón
- Ángela Vergara as Sonia Bermúdez
- Fernando Arévalo as Claudio Días Granados
- Robinson Amariz as Diego Mondragón
- Tommy Vásquez as Stalin Pulido
- Martha Restrepo as Catalina Rodríguez
- Andrés Suárez as Sergio Iragorri
- Astrid Junguito as Eulalia Pulido
- Orlando Lamboglia as Jorge Cortázar
- Yolanda Rayo as Piedad Saavedra
- Juan Carlos Messier as Jorge
- Fernando Lara as Rasquín
- Freddy Flórez as Roosevelt Pulido
- Sebastián Sánchez as Felipe
- Juliana Betancourth as Mónica
- Katherine Escobar as Katherine "Cathy" Belalcázar
- Víctor Hugo Ruiz as Gonzalo Mondragón
- John Ceballos as Loko
- Juan Pablo Barragán as Tito Fuentes
- Catalina Aristizábal as Cecilia Solano
- Liliana Escobar as Dania
- Carlos Torres as Lamborghini Soto
- María Cecilia Botero as Laura Ospina
