= Defying Destiny (TV series) =

2026 Colombian telenovela

- Spanish: María la caprichosa
- Genre: Telenovela
- Based on: Soñar lo imposible by Paula Moreno
- Written by: Juana Uribe; Ana Fernanda Martínez; Carlos Fernández de Soto
- Directed by: Rafael Martínez; Daniel Arenas Samudio
- Starring: Karent Hinestroza
- Composer: Santiago Uribe
- Country of origin: Colombia
- Original language: Spanish
- No. of seasons: 1
- No. of episodes: 64

Production
- Executive producers: Ángela Vergara; Amparo Gutiérrez; Dago García; Juana Uribe; Arlen Torres
- Producer: María Fernanda Henao
- Cinematography: Sergio Iván Castaño; Sonia Pérez
- Editor: Juan Pablo Serna
- Production company: Caracol Televisión

Original release
- Network: Netflix
- Release: 5 January 2026

Defying Destiny (Spanish: María la caprichosa) is a Colombian telenovela produced by Caracol Televisión. It tells the story of union leader for domestic workers in Colombia María Roa Borja, played by Karent Hinestroza, based on the book Soñar lo imposible written by Paula Moreno. It premiered on Netflix on 5 January 2026.

== Cast ==
=== Main ===
- Karent Hinestroza as María Roa Borja
  - Paola González as young María
  - Marggy Selene Valdris as child María
- Indhira Serrano as Perxides Borja
- Julián Diaz as Don Manuel
- Bárbara Perea as Irma
- Paola Moreno as Tulia
- Valeria Caicedo as Francy

=== Recurring ===
- Carolina Cuervo as Doña Sonia
- Sebastián Eslava as Juan Manuel
- Patricia Vásquez as Susana
- Andŕes Juan as Diego Vélez
- Julio Sánchez Cóccaro as Don Alejandro
- Paola Valencia as Marlene
- Jhon Alex Toro as Bernabe
- Camila Zárate as Mariana
- Brayan Mina as Fernando
- Mayra Luna as Edith
- Maxi Sierra as Antonio Vélez
- Leopolda Rojas as Jenny
- Sara Pinzón as Juliana Vélez

== Production ==
Filming of the telenovela began in Bogotá in August 2023, with the production being officially announced on 8 November 2023.

== Ratings ==
Season	Timeslot (COT)	Episodes	First aired		Last aired		Avg. viewers (in points)
Season	Timeslot (COT)	Episodes	Date	Viewers (in points)	Date	Viewers (in points)	Avg. viewers (in points)
1	Mon–Fri 9:30 p.m.	64	4 August 2026	7.2	6 November 2026	5.7	5.9

== Episodes ==
No.	Title	Original release date	Caracol Televisón air date	Colombia linear viewers (millions)
1	"María sueña con ser profesora, pero su condición económica le juega en contra"	5 January 2026	4 August 2026	7.2
2	"María empieza un noviazgo y queda en embarazo"	5 January 2026	5 August 2026	6.4
3	"María descubre secreto de Willington y empieza a trabajar por su bebé"	5 January 2026	6 August 2026	6.2
4	"María se va para Medellín y deja al bebé con sus papás"	5 January 2026	10 August 2026	6.7
5	"María trabaja como vendedora informal y se ennovia con Fernando"	5 January 2026	11 August 2026	6.1
6	"María pasa el periodo de prueba en la casa de doña Milena"	5 January 2026	12 August 2026	6.6
7	"María acepta irse a vivir a una invasión junto a Fernando"	5 January 2026	13 August 2026	6.4
8	"María se entera que está esperando otro hijo"	5 January 2026	14 August 2026	6.1
9	"María debe decidir si tiene a su bebé o no"	5 January 2026	18 August 2026	6.4
10	"El embarazo de María sale a la luz"	5 January 2026	19 August 2026	6.7
11	"María solicita un subsidio tras la amenaza que le hacen a su papá"	5 January 2026	20 August 2026	6.5
12	"Manuel y Pérxides se van a vivir con María"	5 January 2026	21 August 2026	6.2
13	"María da a luz a su segundo bebé; empiezan los problemas con Fernando"	5 January 2026	24 August 2026	6.4
14	"María se entera de los verdaderos negocios de Don Bernabé"	5 January 2026	25 August 2026	6.0
15	"María teme por la salud y seguridad de su esposo e hija"	5 January 2026	26 August 2026	6.0
16	"María recibió una inesperada noticia que arruinó su Navidad"	5 January 2026	27 August 2026	5.7
17	"María tiene inconvenientes para llegar a Apartadó"	5 January 2026	28 August 2026	6.4
18	"Bernabé y Miriam son capturados por las autoridades"	5 January 2026	31 August 2026	5.3
19	"María se entera que se encuentra en embarazo"	5 January 2026	1 September 2026	5.0
20	"María encuentra un nuevo trabajo"	5 January 2026	2 September 2026	4.9
21	"María logra emprender y crea su panadería"	5 January 2026	3 September 2026	5.9
22	"María recibe amenazas de los bandidos del barrio"	5 January 2026	4 September 2026	6.2
23	"Marlene le dice a Juan Manuel que no viajará con él"	5 January 2026	7 September 2026	6.3
24	"María disfruta de la compañía de Leo en un bar de salsa"	5 January 2026	8 September 2026	6.4
25	"Leo tiene una fuerte pelea con Fernando por defender a María"	5 January 2026	9 September 2026	6.5
26	"María toma la decisión de demandar a Fernando ante las autoridades"	5 January 2026	10 September 2026	5.4
27	"María decide no ayudar a Fernando tras descubrir su actitud desafiante"	5 January 2026	11 September 2026	5.6
28	"María comienza a estudiar con ayuda de Leonardo y ambos disfrutan su romance"	5 January 2026	14 September 2026	6.2
29	"María defiende a Rita de los malos tratos de Leonor"	5 January 2026	15 September 2026	6.4
30	"María y Leo comparten un momento especial en Apartadó"	5 January 2026	16 September 2026	5.0
31	"María enfrenta un difícil momento al sentir que nada avanza como ella quisiera"	5 January 2026	17 September 2026	5.4
32	"María se encuentra feliz porque su proyecto avanza"	5 January 2026	18 September 2026	5.7
33	"María cumplió uno de sus grandes sueños y celebró junto a su familia y amigos"	5 January 2026	21 September 2026	6.2
34	"María se reencuentra con Leonardo y tienen una emotiva conversación"	5 January 2026	22 September 2026	5.5
35	"María llega a Bogotá en busca de visibilizar sus derechos"	5 January 2026	23 September 2026	5.4
36	"María sufre dos grandes pérdidas en el amor"	5 January 2026	24 September 2026	5.6
37	"Pérxides recordó con emoción su historia de amor con Manuel durante su velorio"	5 January 2026	25 September 2026	5.3
38	"María vive una triste desilusión por culpa de Greeicy"	5 January 2026	28 September 2026	5.3
39	"María defendió a Rosa tras el incómodo momento que vivió en su lugar de trabajo"	5 January 2026	29 September 2026	5.7
40	"María recibe una llamada que cambia el rumbo de su vida"	5 January 2026	30 September 2026	5.5
41	"María renuncia a la agremiación tras los problemas con Emilia y Greeicy"	5 January 2026	1 October 2026	5.5
42	"María recibe críticas tras la escena que protagonizó su amiga"	5 January 2026	5 October 2026	6.1
43	"Leo y Diana pelean por culpa de María; atraviesan un mal momento"	5 January 2026	6 October 2026	5.3
44	"María expone a Greeicy a través de una llamada"	5 January 2026	7 October 2026	6.1
45	"María tiene nuevos retos en el Congreso y Tulia quiere renunciar"	5 January 2026	8 October 2026	6.2
46	"María atraviesa un momento complejo con la política"	5 January 2026	9 October 2026	5.9
47	"María vuelve a trabajar con la doctora Rivera"	5 January 2026	13 October 2026	5.8
48	"María está más cerca de hacer válida la ley, pero sucede algo inesperado"	5 January 2026	14 October 2026	5.6
49	"María sale del congreso y Simón le da un beso"	5 January 2026	15 October 2026	6.5
50	"María va al congreso y los senadores votan a favor de su ley"	5 January 2026	16 October 2026	6.6
51	"Simón le dice a María que debe alejarse de ella"	5 January 2026	19 October 2026	5.6
52	"María es una de las finalistas del premio: Mujer del año"	5 January 2026	20 October 2026	6.1
53	"María emprende un viaje a Medellín"	5 January 2026	21 October 2026	6.0
54	"Serrates está perdiendo aliados para destruir a María"	5 January 2026	22 October 2026	6.3
55	"Leo le pide a Diana que arreglen sus diferencias"	5 January 2026	23 October 2026	6.4
56	"El congreso aprueba la ley, pero María no está contenta"	5 January 2026	26 October 2026	5.7
57	"María recibe una noticia inesperada por parte de su hijo"	5 January 2026	27 October 2026	5.9
58	"Felipe le hace una propuesta a Diana"	5 January 2026	28 October 2026	5.9
59	"Sergio le dice a María que él y Pérxides no quieren ir a México"	5 January 2026	29 October 2026	5.2
60	"María se entera de lo que sucede entre Felipe y Diana"	5 January 2026	30 October 2026	5.1
61	"Tulia es víctima de un supuesto robo por parte de sus jefes"	5 January 2026	3 November 2026	6.1
62	"María hace una asamblea con sus amigas y les da noticias"	5 January 2026	4 November 2026	6.2
63	"María se convierte en abuela y Rivera le da una buena noticia"	5 January 2026	5 November 2026	6.2
64	"María tiene su primer día de clases y cambia de look"	5 January 2026	6 November 2026	5.7

== Release ==
The series was released on Netflix worldwide, except for Colombia, on 5 January 2026, followed by its broadcast in Colombia on Caracol Televisión from 4 August 2026 to 6 November 2026.
