= ¿En qué lío me metí? =

- Genre: Telenovela
- Created by: Jhonny Ortiz
- Written by: Jhonny Ortiz; Gustavo Salcedo
- Directed by: Rodrigo Triana; Carlos Mario Urrea
- Starring: Yuri Vargas; Sebastián Carvajal
- Composers: Nicolas Uribe; Sebastián Luengas
- Country of origin: Colombia
- Original language: Spanish
- No. of seasons: 1
- No. of episodes: 5

Production
- Executive producer: Asier Aguilar
- Cinematography: Ricardo Torres; Julián Torres
- Editor: Andrea Paola Díaz
- Production company: Caracol Televisión

Original release
- Network: Caracol Televisión
- Release: 9 November 2026 – present

¿En qué lío me metí? is a Colombian telenovela created by Jhonny Ortiz. It follows the story of Soraya Montaño, a physiotherapist who takes over a renowned company amidst a mystery surrounding the death of its tycoon. The telenovela stars Yuri Vargas and Sebastián Carvajal. It premiered on 9 November 2026.

== Plot ==
Soraya Montaño, a physiotherapist who firmly believes in the goodness of people, receives an unexpected mission: to become the manager of a major multinational corporation and decide which of its members deserves to inherit the fortune of Mario Pombo, who was her patient and who, without warning, took his own life. The decision sparks a competition among the members of the Pombo family, each vying to prove they have what it takes to assume control of the business. However, Soraya's assignment takes a turn when it's discovered that Mario didn't take his own life, but was murdered, and the culprit is hiding among the candidates to inherit his fortune.

== Cast ==
- Yuri Vargas as Soraya Montaño
- Sebastián Carvajal as Carlos Pombo
- Jorge Cao as Mario Pombo
- Amparo Grisales as Doris Pombo
- Chichila Navia as Deyanira Montaño
- Sebastián "Chachán" Sánchez as Tobías Laverde
- Jimmy Vásquez as Jimmy Rojas
- Catalina Londoño as Margarita Pombo
- Andrés Sandoval as Ernesto Pombo
- María Helena Döering as Eva Solarte
- Laura Taylor as Alejandra Laverde Pombo
- Brandon Figueredo as Jeison Rojas Montaño
- Julio Sánchez Cóccaro
- María Laura Quintero
- Manuela Valdez
- Juan Alfonso Baptista

== Ratings ==
| Season | Timeslot (COT) | Episodes | First aired | | Last aired | | Avg. viewers (in points) |
| Season | Timeslot (COT) | Episodes | Date | Viewers (in points) | Date | Viewers (in points) | Avg. viewers (in points) |
|---|---|---|---|---|---|---|---|
| 1 | Mon–Fri 9:30 p.m. | 5 | 6 November 2026 | 6.5 | TBA | TBD | 6.2 |

== Episodes ==
| No. | Title | Original air date | Colombia viewers (Rating points) |
|---|---|---|---|
| 1 | "Muere Mario Pombo y Soraya empezará de cero en un nuevo cargo" | 9 November 2026 | 6.5 |
| 2 | "La familia Pombo conoce a la nueva gerente de la empresa" | 10 November 2026 | 6.3 |
| 3 | "La familia Pombo encuentra las redes sociales de Soraya" | 11 November 2026 | 6.7 |
| 4 | "Soraya hace lo que negó hace días y su plan crece" | 12 November 2026 | 5.9 |
| 5 | "Soraya habla con Jeison y él le propone una idea "millonaria"" | 17 November 2026 | 5.8 |
| 6 | "Soraya toma la primera decisión seria escuchando su corazón" | 18 November 2026 | TBD |
| 7 | "Deyanira no está de acuerdo con la inesperada visita" | 19 November 2026 | TBD |
