= Ana María Kámper =

Ana María Kamper is a dancer, artist and actress of stage, screen and television in Colombia of Austrian descent. She is one of Colombia's most respected and recognized performers in the television media in Colombia.

== Personal life ==
Ana Maria Kamper started as a ballerina before moving into theater.

== Career ==
Studied basic of Mater Dei school and college education which was the first school for girls from Colombia, between 1972 and 1988 study dance, ballet, jazz and contemporary dance. Also during those years until 2005, studied music and music theory, studied theater between 1984 and 2007, between 1995 and 2000 study drama and speech training.

== Filmography ==
- La reina madre - Teatro - 2014
- Los graduados - (2013)
- Mentiras perfectas (2013)
- Dónde diablos está Umaña? (Colombian telenovela) 2012 - Lorenza Nieto, "Niña Lore"
- Amores que matan - Teatro - 2011
- A mano limpia - Colombian telenovela (2011)
- A Corazón Abierto (2010)
- Rosario Tijeras (2010)
- La quiero a morir (2008)
- Montecristo: entre el amor y la traición (2007)
- La Milagrosa - Film (2007)
- En los tacones de Eva (2007)
- El ventilador (2007)
- Colombianos un acto de Fe Film (2004)
- The Vagina Monologues (2002 a 2008)
- Todos quieren con Marilyn (2004)
- Me amaras bajo la lluvia (2004)
- Padres e Hijos (1992)
- Punto de giro (2003)
- La Jaula (2003)
- Entretelones (2003)
- Humo en tus ojos - Film(2002)
- Juan joyita quiere ser caballero(2001)
- Enséñame a vivir teatro (2001)
- A donde va Soledad (2000)
- Brujeres (2000)
- Pobre Pablo (2000)
- Terminal - Film (2000)
- La señorita Julia Teatro (2000)
- Tabú (1999)
- Carolina Barrantes (1998)
- Hombres (1997)
- Sobrevivir (1997)
- Leche (1996)
- Compañía teatro (1996)
- Sueños y espejos (1996)
- Los caballeros las prefieren brutas (1995)
- Otra en mí (1995)
- Oro (1995)
- Las aguas mansas (1994)
- Todos en la cama (1994)
- Señora Isabel (1994)
- Equus (1994)
- Cartas a Harrison (1994)
- Mi única verdad(1993)
- Divertimentos Teatro (1993)
- Shampoo (1993)
- La maldición del paraíso (1993)
- Espérame al final (1992)
- Fronteras del regreso (1992)
- Tartufo (1992)
- Pantaleón y las visitadoras (1991)
- Las preciosas ridículas (1991)
- Entremeses (1990)
- Macondo (1989)
- El diario de Ana Frank (1988)
- La maldición del paraíso
- No morirás
- La cándida Eréndira y su abuela desalmada (1982)
- Poker (2010)
