= Variel Sánchez =

Colombian actor and airplane pilot (born 1989)

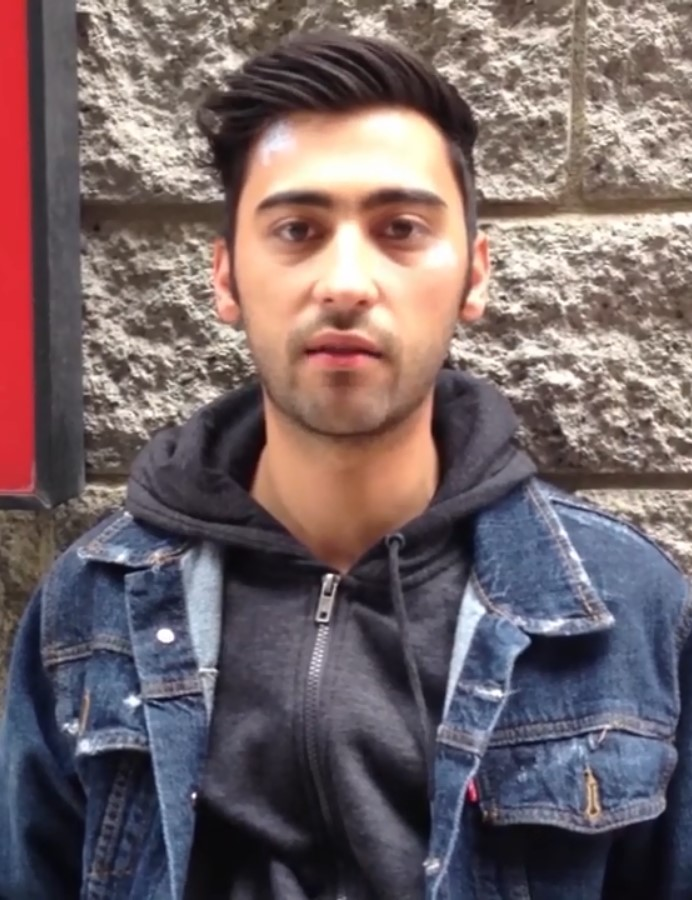
- Born: Variel Alejandro Sánchez Ordóñez; 14 December 1989 (age 36); Bogota, Colombia
- Years active: 2000–present
- Spouse: Estefanía Godoy (m. 2019)
- Children: 2

Variel Alejandro Sánchez Ordóñez (born 14 December 1989) is a Colombian actor and airplane pilot. He stood out for Vicente Guerra, in the first season of A mano limpia. He subsequently participated in the series The Girl, series for which he won two awards for best supporting actor at the TVyNovelas Awards Colombia, and India Catalina Awards in 2017. And recently in the series El Barón, and Loquito por ti.

== Biography ==
Sánchez was born on 14 December 1989 as Variel Alejandro Sánchez Ordóñez in Bogota, Colombia. He is the son of renowned Colombian actor Julio Sánchez Coccaro. He is married to actress and model Estefanía Godoy, with whom he has two children. He studied body expression at the Chrysalis a Butterfly School, and at Clara Luna, a theater and singing school. In addition to that he graduated as a commercial airplane pilot, but currently does not work in such a job.

== Filmography ==
Television roles
Year	Title	Role	Notes
2000–2001	Francisco el matemático	Bryan Rodríguez	
2002	Jack el despertador	Simón	
2009	Las trampas del amor	Elvis Solano	
2010–2011	A mano limpia	Vicente Guerra	Recurring role; 178 episodes
2012–2013	Mamá también	Bryan Pinto	Recurring role; 105 episodes
2013	Mentiras perfectas	Fredy	
2014	El Chivo	Unknown role	
2015	Hermanitas Calle	Álvaro de Jesús Meléndez	
2016	The Girl	Víctor Manjarrés	
2018	Undercover Law	Junior	Recurring role; 11 episodes
2018–2019	Loquito por ti	Camilo Arango	Main role; 80 episodes
2019	El Barón	Ramiro Villa "El Paisa"	Main role; 59 episodes
2020	Pa' quererte	Lorenzo Ríos	
2025	Nuevo rico, nuevo pobre	Brayan Galindo	
