= Devuélveme la vida =

- Genre: Telenovela
- Created by: Camilo Acuña; María Paula Bustamante
- Written by: Ana María Parra; Diego Vivanco; Christian Osorio
- Directed by: Mónica Botero; Jhonny Hendrix Hinestroza; Luis Alberto Restrepo; Carlos Urrea
- Starring: Paula Castaño; María José Camacho; Jair Romero; Sergio Herrera
- Music by: Santiago Uribe
- Country of origin: Colombia
- Original language: Spanish
- No. of seasons: 1
- No. of episodes: 60

Production
- Executive producer: Asier Aguilar
- Editor: Andrea Díaz
- Production company: Caracol Televisión

Original release
- Network: Caracol Televisión
- Release: 16 April – 15 July 2024

Devuélveme la vida (English title: Love of My Life) is a Colombian telenovela produced by Asier Aguilar. It aired on Caracol Televisión from 16 April 2024 to 15 July 2024. The series stars Paula Castaño and Jair Romero.

== Premise ==
Set between the 1950s and 70s, the series follows the emergence of a forbidden passion between Mariana Azcarate, the heiress of the cotton plantation La Victoria, and Joaquín Mosquera, an Afro day laborer.

== Cast ==
=== Main ===
- Paula Castaño as Mariana Azcárate
  - María José Camacho as young Mariana
- Jair Romero as Joaquín Mosquera
  - Sergio Herrera as young Joaquín
- Jairo Camargo as Alfredo Azcárate
  - Carlos Manuel Vesga as young Alfredo
- Jefferson Quiñones as Graciliano Mosquera
- Luis Gerónimo Abreu as Rogelio Benítez
  - Ricardo Mejía as young Rogelio
- Maia Landaburu as Ofelia
- Paola Valencia as Josefina "Josefa" Mosquera
- Ana Harlen Mosquera as Virgelina
- Nina Caicedo as Carla Williams
- Luigi Aicardi as Orlando Azcárate
- José Julián Gaviria as Abelardo Azcárate
- Jefferson Carabali
- Maura Janeth Castillo
- Adriana Osorio as Benancia
- Kriss Cifuentes as Tino
- Melanie Dell'olmo as Sara
- Jair Eugenio Romero Cholesterols
- Felipe Giraldo as Bonche

=== Recurring and guest stars ===
- Santiago Miniño
- Juan Carlos Cruz
- Mauricio Dorado
- Eibar Gutiérrez
- Isabel Tous Vélez
- Solanish Villa Angulo
- Hodson Samuel Livingston
- Mariela Home

== Production ==
In December 2022, Devuélveme la vida was announced as part of Caracol Televisión's programming for 2023. The series was delayed to 2024.

== Episodes ==
No.	Title	Original release date	Colombia viewers (Rating points)
1	"Mariana da rienda suelta a su amor por Joaquín y su padre enfurece"	16 April 2024	7.1
2	"Mariana da a luz y su bebé es dado por muerto"	17 April 2024	6.4
3	"Mariana es internada en una institución mental por la fuerza"	18 April 2024	5.3
4	"Mariana tiene una vida secreta en Cali"	19 April 2024	6.9
5	"Mariana tiene contacto con su hijo"	22 April 2024	7.4
6	"Mariana le pide a Benítez que se case con ella a escondidas"	23 April 2024	7.1
7	"Alfredo impide la boda entre Mariana y Rogelio e impone sus reglas"	24 April 2024	7.5
8	"Mariana y Benítez se casan"	25 April 2024	7.4
9	"Joel y Tino llegan a la hacienda La Victoria gracias a Mariana"	26 April 2024	8.2
10	"Joaquín llega a La Victoria y se reencuentra con sus padres"	29 April 2024	8.3
11	"Virgelina muere en extrañas circunstancias en la hacienda"	30 April 2024	7.8
12	"Pasan 10 años en La Victoria y todo cambia por completo"	2 May 2024	7.5
13	"Sara descubre la identidad de Tino y conoce a Joel"	3 May 2024	7.0
14	"Sara empieza a indagar sobre su pasado y duda de sus padres"	6 May 2024	7.5
15	"Sara confirma sus sospechas: fue adoptada"	7 May 2024	7.2
16	"Mariana y Joaquín se encuentran"	8 May 2024	7.4
17	"La vida de Tino, Joel y Sara empieza a entrelazarse"	9 May 2024	7.7
18	"El banco le rechaza a Mariana el préstamo para La Victoria"	10 May 2024	8.0
19	"Sara descubre una pista sobre su mamá"	14 May 2024	7.6
20	"Mariana y Joaquín se dejan llevar y se besan"	15 May 2024	8.3
21	"Rogelio termina con la vida de otra persona"	16 May 2024	8.2
22	"Mariana decide darse otra oportunidad con Benítez"	17 May 2024	7.4
23	"Sara y Joe se dejan llevar por la pasión"	20 May 2024	7.5
24	"Ofelia incendia el coche de la esposa difunta de Alfredo"	21 May 2024	8.6
25	"Tino acepta ser el culpable de lo ocurrido con Joe"	22 May 2024	8.4
26	"Joe y Sara empiezan una relación clandestina"	23 May 2024	8.2
27	"¿Mariana descubre que Joaquín está vivo?"	24 May 2024	8.4
28	"Mariana descubre que Joaquín está casado"	27 May 2024	8.2
29	"Mariana se entera de que Stewart en realidad es Joaquín"	28 May 2024	8.4
30	"Alfredo es víctima del incendio de la cosecha"	29 May 2024	8.9
31	"Rogelio descubre que Joaquín le hizo un préstamo a Mariana"	30 May 2024	8.3
32	"Rogelio descubre el secreto de Mariana y Joaquín"	31 May 2024	7.6
33	"Rogelio desenmascara a Joaquín ante las autoridades"	4 June 2024	8.7
34	"Mariana busca la forma de sacar a Joaquín de la cárcel"	5 June 2024	9.0
35	"Sara es secuestrada por los enemigos de Joe"	6 June 2024	8.0
36	"Karla viaja a Colombia y se hace cargo de El Búcaro"	7 June 2024	8.5
37	"Joaquín recurre a medidas extremas para recordar su pasado"	11 June 2024	8.3
38	"Sara y Lucy se conocen y terminan enfrentadas"	12 June 2024	8.5
39	"Mariana y Karla acuden al hombre que puede salvar a Joaquín"	13 June 2024	8.3
40	"Rogelio amenaza a Aguilar para evitar que testifique"	14 June 2024	8.3
41	"Graciliano se entera quién es la madre de Sara"	17 June 2024	8.2
42	"Sara confronta a Rogelio al conocer a su mamá"	18 June 2024	9.4
43	"Sara le pide matrimonio a Joe, pero hay un obstáculo"	19 June 2024	8.8
44	"Joaquín es atacado por órdenes de Rogelio"	20 June 2024	9.0
45	"Rogelio desocupa todas las cuentas de banco de Mariana"	21 June 2024	8.3
46	"Mariana y Joaquín emprenden la búsqueda de su hijo"	24 June 2024	8.9
47	"Tino descubre que podría ser hijo de Mariana"	25 June 2024	9.3
48	"Una tragedia interrumpe el matrimonio de Alfredo y Ofelia"	26 June 2024	9.1
49	"Tino le oculta a Joaquín que él podría ser su hijo"	27 June 2024	8.7
50	"Joaquín descubre que Tino le mintió"	28 June 2024	8.3
51	"Mariana descubre que podría ser la mamá biológica de Joe"	2 July 2024	13.4
52	"Mariana le hace una propuesta a Joe"	3 July 2024	9.5
53	"Alfredo le hace una dolorosa confesión a Mariana"	4 July 2024	9.5
54	"Joe logra cambiar y ser clave para La Victoria"	5 July 2024	8.5
55	"Joaquín le pide matrimonio a Mariana"	8 July 2024	9.5
56	"¿Un secuestro arruina las bodas de Mariana y Sara?"	9 July 2024	9.3
57	"Mariana es secuestrada por Rogelio con engaños"	10 July 2024	11.2
58	"Los Azcárate lloran la presunta muerte de Mariana"	11 July 2024	9.9
59	"Tino muere y Rogelio queda acorralado"	12 July 2024	8.7
60	"Se define el destino de Rogelio y los Azcárate"	15 July 2024	9.5

== Reception ==
=== Ratings ===
Season	Timeslot (COT)	Episodes	First aired		Last aired		Avg. viewers (in points)
Season	Timeslot (COT)	Episodes	Date	Viewers (in points)	Date	Viewers (in points)	Avg. viewers (in points)
1	Mon–Fri 9:30 p.m.	60	16 April 2024	7.1	15 July 2024	9.5	8.3

=== Awards and nominations ===
Year	Award	Category	Nominated	Result	Ref
2024	Produ Awards	Best Short Telenovela	Devuélveme la vida	Won	
2024	Produ Awards	Best Lead Actress - Short Telenovela	María José Camacho	Nominated	
2024	Produ Awards	Best Lead Actress - Short Telenovela	Paula Castaño	Won	
2024	Produ Awards	Best Lead Actor - Short Telenovela	Jair Romero	Won	
2024	Produ Awards	Best Lead Actor - Short Telenovela	Luis Gerónimo Abreu	Nominated	
2024	Produ Awards	Best Lead Actor - Short Telenovela	Sergio Herrera	Nominated	
2024	Produ Awards	Best Directing - Superseries or Telenovela	Luis Alberto Restrepo, Carlos Mario Urrea, Mónica Botero & Jhonny Hendrix Hinestroza	Nominated	
2024	Produ Awards	Best Producer - Superseries or Telenovela	Asier Aguilar	Nominated	
2024	Produ Awards	Best Art Direction - Superseries or Telenovela	Gabriela Monroy	Nominated	
2025	Rose d'Or Latinos Awards	Best Telenovela	Devuélveme la vida	Won	
2025	India Catalina Awards	Best Telenovela	Devuélveme la vida	Nominated	
