= Newly Rich, Newly Poor (2025 TV series) =

2025 Colombian telenovela

- Spanish: Nuevo rico, nuevo pobre
- Genre: Telenovela
- Based on: Newly Rich, Newly Poor by Jörg Hiller
- Written by: Jörg Hiller; María Cecilia Boenheim
- Directed by: Rodrigo Triana; Juan Carlos Vásquez
- Starring: Variel Sánchez; Juan Guilera; Lina Tejeiro; Laura Barjum
- Theme music composer: Nicolás Uribe; Sebastián Luengas
- Opening theme: "Nadie Sabe Lo Que Tiene" by Juan Triana
- Composer: Octavio Rojas
- Country of origin: Colombia
- Original language: Spanish
- No. of seasons: 1
- No. of episodes: 62

Production
- Executive producer: Manuel Peñaloza
- Editor: Juan Pablo Serna
- Production company: Caracol Televisión

Original release
- Network: Caracol Televisión
- Release: 10 February – 14 May 2025

Newly Rich, Newly Poor (Spanish: Nuevo rico, nuevo pobre) is a Colombian telenovela based on the 2007 telenovela of the same name created by Jörg Hiller. It aired on Caracol Televisión from 10 February 2025 to 14 May 2025. The series stars Variel Sánchez, Juan Guilera, Lina Tejeiro and Laura Barjum.

== Cast ==
- Variel Sánchez as Brayan Galindo
- Juan Guilera as Andrés Ferreira
- Lina Tejeiro as Rosmery Peláez
- Laura Barjum as Fernanda Sanmiguel
- Marcela Agudelo as Antonia Mancera de Ferreira
- Jhon Alex Toro as Leónidas Galindo
- Clary Borja as Lizeth Rubio
- Ricardo Mejía as Mateo López Ferreira
- Julián Caicedo as Fidel "El Gordo" Peláez
- Laura Taylor as Ingrid Peláez
- Nestor Alfonso Rojas as Hugo Gómez
- Martha Restrepo as Maritza Buenahora
- Cristian Villamil as Miller Anselmo Afanador Carranza
- Álvaro Bayona as Julio Landázuri

== Production ==
On 15 May 2024, Caracol Televisión announced that production had begun on a remake of the 2007 telenovela Newly Rich, Newly Poor, with Variel Sánchez, Juan Guilera, Lina Tejeiro and Laura Barjum confirmed in the lead roles. Filming wrapped in November of that year. In January 2025, Caracol released the first official trailer for the telenovela.

== Ratings ==
Season	Timeslot (COT)	Episodes	First aired		Last aired		Avg. viewers (in points)
Season	Timeslot (COT)	Episodes	Date	Viewers (in points)	Date	Viewers (in points)	Avg. viewers (in points)
1	Mon–Fri 9:30 p.m.	62	10 February 2025	8.0	14 May 2025	9.1	7.6

== Episodes ==
No.	Title	Original air date	Colombia viewers (Rating points)
1	"Andrés Ferreira y Brayan Galindo resultan con la familia errada"	10 February 2025	8.0
2	"Antonia inicia la búsqueda de su verdadero hijo"	11 February 2025	8.0
3	"Andrés y Brayan tiene un encuentro desagradable"	12 February 2025	7.2
4	"Antonia le cuenta la verdad a Leonidas sobre sus hijos"	13 February 2025	8.3
5	"Brayan y Andrés descubren la verdad sobre sus familias"	14 February 2025	7.7
6	"Andrés tiene una crisis al enfrentarse a su nueva vida"	17 February 2025	7.8
7	"Brayan no quiere tener ninguna relación con Leonidas"	18 February 2025	7.5
8	"Andrés le ordena a Antonia realizar una prueba de ADN"	19 February 2025	7.8
9	"Brayan toma el puesto de presidente de CartSmart"	20 February 2025	7.2
10	"Mateo se adueñará de la presidencia de CartSmart"	21 February 2025	8.0
11	"Rosmery encuentra a Brayan en compañía de Fernanda"	24 February 2025	8.3
12	"Andrés termina preso al no aceptar su nueva vida"	25 February 2025	7.4
13	"Brayan no es capaz de asumir sus responsabilidades"	26 February 2025	7.1
14	"Brayan se siente presionado frente a su vida amorosa"	27 February 2025	7.4
15	"Fernanda intenta cambiar la personalidad de Brayan"	28 February 2025	7.0
16	"Rosmery termina su relación con Brayan"	3 March 2025	4.3
17	"Andrés no puede evitar tener sentimientos hacia Rosmery"	4 March 2025	7.0
18	"Andrés decide hacerse cargo de la deuda de Leonidas"	5 March 2025	7.9
19	"Rosmery acompaña a Andrés a buscar trabajo"	6 March 2025	7.2
20	"Brayan le propone matrimonio a Rosmery"	7 March 2025	7.3
21	"Andrés acepta trabajar en CartSmart para pagar sus deudas"	10 March 2025	7.4
22	"Andrés es un inconveniente para los planes de Mateo"	11 March 2025	7.5
23	"Mateo quiere convencer a Brayan de cancelar su compromiso"	12 March 2025	7.1
24	"Andrés asiste a la fiesta de compromiso de Brayan"	13 March 2025	7.9
25	"Fernanda intenta acabar con el compromiso de Brayan"	14 March 2025	7.8
26	"Andrés planea conquistar a Rosmery"	17 March 2025	7.8
27	"Brayan le es infiel a Rosmery con Fernanda"	18 March 2025	7.9
28	"Brayan le pide ayuda a Andrés para salvar CartSmart"	19 March 2025	6.6
29	"Andrés le niega su ayuda a Brayan"	20 March 2025	9.2
30	"Andrés sufre un accidente en la pensión"	21 March 2025	7.2
31	"Andrés acepta regresar a CartSmart por complacer a Rosmery"	25 March 2025	8.4
32	"Brayan le da un enorme regalo a Rosmery de cumpleaños"	26 March 2025	5.5
33	"Brayan le hace una escena de celos a Fernanda"	27 March 2025	7.4
34	"Rosmery descubre la infidelidad de Brayan"	28 March 2025	7.3
35	"Rosmery regresa a vivir a la pensión"	31 March 2025	7.8
36	"Fernanda le propone a Brayan despedir a Rosmery"	1 April 2025	7.5
37	"Fernanda descubre que Mateo y Lizeth tuvieron una aventura"	2 April 2025	6.8
38	"Fernanda ayuda a Brayan y Andrés con CatarGroup"	3 April 2025	8.4
39	"Andrés renuncia por un desacuerdo con Brayan"	4 April 2025	7.2
40	"Cartsmart queda por fuera del acuerdo de inversión"	7 April 2025	6.4
41	"Andrés saldrá con Rosmery por un negocio pendiente"	8 April 2025	8.2
42	"Andrés se besa con Rosmery y le confiesa sus sentimientos"	9 April 2025	8.5
43	"Andrés decide alejarse de Rosmery por su bien"	10 April 2025	8.0
44	"Rosmery descubre a Andrés besándose con Maritza"	11 April 2025	7.4
45	"Fernanda acepta firmar las capitulaciones con una condición"	14 April 2025	7.7
46	"Rosmery, Andrés y Brayan se encuentran en Cartagena"	15 April 2025	7.0
47	"Brayan se ahoga, pero Fernanda piensa en su fortuna"	16 April 2025	6.2
48	"Rosmery y Andrés pasan su primera noche juntos"	22 April 2025	7.4
49	"Fidel es arrestado e investigado por contrabando"	23 April 2025	7.6
50	"Ingrid le confiesa a Rosmery que está embarazada"	24 April 2025	7.3
51	"Brayan cae en la trampa de Fernanda y le es infiel"	25 April 2025	8.5
52	"Brayan descubre a Fernanda y la persigue"	28 April 2025	8.1
53	"Olvidan el cumpleaños de Brayan y Rosmery lo sorprende"	29 April 2025	7.5
54	"Brayan presiona a Fernanda a vivir en la pensión"	30 April 2025	7.5
55	"Paulina le regresa a Andrés todas sus comodidades"	2 May 2025	7.9
56	"Brayan decide reconquistar a Rosmery y dejar a Fernanda"	6 May 2025	8.3
57	"Rosmery le confiesa a Brayan su situación con Andrés y se pone a llorar"	7 May 2025	7.9
58	"La relación de Andrés y Rosmery podría llegar a su fin"	8 May 2025	8.4
59	"Fernanda recibe una propuesta para separarse de Brayan"	9 May 2025	8.4
60	"Fernanda y Mateo secuestran a Maritza"	12 May 2025	8.1
61	"Brayan descubre que Mateo ha sido amante y cómplice de Fernanda"	13 May 2025	8.5
62	"Una boda cuádruple une a los Ferreira y los Galindo"	14 May 2025	9.1

== Awards and nominations ==
Year	Award	Category	Nominated	Result	Ref
2025	Produ Awards	Best Superseries	Nuevo rico, nuevo pobre	Nominated	
2025	Produ Awards	Best Lead Actress - Superseries	Lina Tejeiro	Won	
2025	Produ Awards	Best Lead Actor - Superseries	Juan Guilera	Nominated	
2025	Produ Awards	Best Lead Actor - Superseries	Variel Sánchez	Nominated	
2025	Produ Awards	Best Supporting Actress - Superseries	Laura Barjum	Nominated	
2025	Produ Awards	Best Content Under Sustainable Production	Nuevo rico, nuevo pobre	Nominated	
