= El hijo del Cacique =

Colombian Caracol's series

- Genre: Telenovela
- Directed by: Andrés Bierman; Rodolfo Hoyos
- Starring: Milciades Cantillo
- Country of origin: Colombia
- Original language: Spanish
- No. of episodes: 80

Production
- Executive producer: Manuel Peñaloza
- Camera setup: Multi-camera

Original release
- Network: Caracol Televisión (Colombia); Televen (Venezuela)
- Release: 15 October 2019 – 11 February 2020

El hijo del Cacique is a Colombian telenovela that premiered on Venezuelan broadcast channel Televen on 15 October 2019, and concluded on 11 February 2020. The telenovela is based on the life of the late Colombian singer Martín Elías, son of Diomedes Díaz. It stars Milciades Cantillo as the titular character. The series premiered on Caracol Television on September 13, 2021 and ended on January 7, 2022.

== Cast ==
- Milciades Cantillo as Martín Elías
- Rafael Santos Díaz as himself
- Francesco Chedraui as Diomedes Díaz
- Lillyana Guihurt as Patricia Acosta
- Rafael Acosta as Luis Ángel Díaz
- Óscar Díaz as Diomedes de Jesús
- Eibar Gutiérrez as Elver Díaz
- Margoth Velásquez as Elvira Maestre "Mamá Vila"
- Carlos Andrés Villa as Romualdo (character inspired on Rolando Ochoa)
- Vivian Ossa as Tata (character inspired on Caya Varón)
- Valerie Domínguez as Chavita
- Jhon Mindiola as Silvestre Dangond

== Background and legal problems ==
The telenovela was initially to be titled Martín Elías, el inmortal, but because the name and image of the singer belong to his two former ex-wives, and because the telenovela is not based solely on Martín's life, since a large part would star Rafael Santos, the brother of the singer, the title was modified to El hijo del Cacique. The telenovela story is based on the stories of the singer's brothers and mother and will take place in Valledupar and Bogotá.
