= Pobre Pablo =

- Created by: Juan Carlos Pérez
- Written by: Juan Carlos Pérez; Adriana Suárez
- Directed by: Kepa Amuchastegui
- Starring: Roberto Cano; Carolina Acevedo
- Theme music composer: Carolina Gutiérrez, Juan Gabriel Turbay
- Opening theme: "Pobre Pablo" by Juan Gabriel Turbay
- Country of origin: Colombia
- Original language: Spanish
- No. of episodes: 183

Production
- Executive producer: Amparo Gutiérrez
- Producer: Miriam Gómez
- Production locations: Bogotá; Cartagena; Miami, Florida, United States
- Cinematography: Diego N. López
- Editor: Maria Claudia Garcia
- Production company: RCN Televisión

Original release
- Network: RCN
- Release: 2000 – 2002

Related
- Despertar contigo

Pobre Pablo, is a Colombian telenovela created by Juan Carlos Pérez for RCN Televisión. Starring by Roberto Cano and Carolina Acevedo. It was the most-watched telenovela of Colombia during the two years that lasted into the air.

== Plot ==
Pablo, the bodyguard of a wealthy family, lives with his mother and two siblings while posing as a millionaire to win the heart of a rich young woman who lives in Miami, but she is committed to Federico Villegas de la Concha. Cindy, a daughter of a neighbor of the Guerrero family, is in love with Pablo but makes it impossible for Pablo to fall in love with her.

== Cast ==
- Roberto Cano as Pablo Herminio Guerrero
- Carolina Acevedo as María Alcalá
- Valentina Rendón as Cindy Mercedes Casilimas
- Diego Trujillo as Antonio Santamaría
- Pedro Rendón as Alejandro Santamaría
- Luisa Fernanda Giraldo as Susy
- Ana María Kamper as Ligia de Santamaria
- Tatiana Jauregui as Adela
- Salvo Basile as Luciano Fisiquella
- Alejandro Martínez as Federico Villegas de la Concha
- César Mora as José Ramón Alcalá
- Andrés Felipe Martínez as Eduardo
- Felipe Noguera as Bernardo Gomez "Berny"
- Rodrigo Castro as Juancho
- Rita Bendek as Dra. Patricia
- Pilar Uribe as Ana de Alcalá
- Vanessa Simon as Catalina Luzardo
- Alfonso Ortiz as Rafael Casilimas
- Alberto Valdiri as Salomón Agudelo
- Carlos Manuel Vesga as Wilson Casilimas Simbaqueva
- Carmenza Gómez as Tulia de Guerrero
- Marcela Posada as Milady
- Carla Giraldo as Jenny Paola Guerrero
- Fanny Lu as Silvanna
- María José Tafur as Johanna
- Carlos Hurtado as Genaro
- Luis Fernando Salas as Néstor Covos
- Ana Bolena Meza as Sofía Arbeláez
