= El embajador de la India =

1987 film

- Directed by: Mario Ribero Ferreira
- Written by: Mário González
- Screenplay by: Mário González
- Based on: Real events on 1964
- Produced by: Maria José Valencia
- Starring: Húgo Gomez; Olga Lucía Alvira; José María Azruaga
- Cinematography: Mario García Joya
- Music by: Jorge Villamil
- Production companies: Focine (Colombia); Icaic (Cuba)
- Distributed by: Focine
- Release dates: 1986 (Teatro Cinema Almirante Chapinero); 15 April 1987 (Bogotá, Colombia)
- Running time: 94 minutes
- Country: Colombia
- Language: Spanish

El embajador de la India (Spanish: The ambassador of India) is a 1986 Colombian comedy film directed by Mario Ribero Ferreira and the screenplay by Mario González. It stars Hugo Gomez, Olga Lucía Alvira and José María Arzuaga. The film is based on the true story of Jaime Torres Ortiz (Jaime Flóres Torres in film), an unemployed ex-seminarian teacher that is traveling on his way to Neiva, and using his knowledge about Eastern cultures, impersonates the ambassador of India, a country that at the time did not yet have diplomatic relations with Colombia.

It is considered a classic comedy Colombian film.

== Plot ==
Jaime Flórez is an unemployed Colombian and former seminarian in his 40s who heads to Garzón to visit an uncle. On the bus that goes to the city of Neiva, two merchants get on and Jaime begins to deceive them by posing as an Indian tourist whose vehicle broke down in El Espinal and decided to continue on the bus in order to appreciate the Colombian landscapes. In Neiva, the two merchants believe that Jaime is the ambassador of India in Colombia and therefore they take him to the Neiva Plaza Hotel, which is the most important in the city. Already at the hotel, Jaime registers with the name "Maharajá Rama Ahujama" and asks the two merchants not to say anything about his presence in the city.

The two merchants break the promise and inform José María, the city's tailor, about the presence of the supposed Indian ambassador. José María immediately calls the governor of Huila and they decide to give him a formal reception and guarantee him comforts so that the ambassador felt comfortable in the city. The next day, the authorities, led by the governor, go to the hotel to greet the Indian ambassador. Jaime, thinking that he had been discovered, tries to hide but then decides to continue with the deception. José María makes him distinctive Indian costumes, and that night a dinner is held in his honor where Jaime meets Silvia, the Governor's daughter, with whom he falls in love. At dinner they offer him the typical regional dishes-mostly beef, pork and chicken- but Jaime decides not to eat anything since he knew that a good part of the people of India are vegetarians due to their Buddhist and Hindu traditions. This forces him to look for a salad, which he eats with great pleasure as well as cassava which he jokingly says "yuco" (instead of its correct name in Spanish, yucca).

The next day, Jaime as ambassador is invited to a military event. During the event, a former classmate from the seminary recognizes Jaime Flórez and tries to reveal him, but Jaime denies everything and both the police and the governor proceed to arrest the subject, who is brutally beaten for embarrassing the city, and for him to say to the governor and the ambassador later in court that everything was a confusion, just so as not to continue being mistreated. Knowing that his charade could soon be discovered, Jaime attempts to flee the hotel using the sheets as a rope. When he manages to escape, a vehicle begins to chase him through the city streets. A tired Jaime gives up, but the person in the vehicle turns out to be Almícar, a former seminary classmate and good friend of Jaime's, with whom he goes drinking that night and tells him everything, but Almícar convinces him to continue with the deception for a while longer.

In the early morning, the authorities notice the ambassador's escape and believe that he may have been kidnapped, but then Jaime arrives at the hotel with a strong hangover after drinking the night before. Jaime spends the day in the hotel pool under the gaze of the city's women and takes advantage of the situation he decides that he is going to take measurements of all the women to make dresses for them from India. Jaime only takes personal measurements of the most beautiful women, while he forces the ugliest women to write their measurements in a notebook. During the measurement taking, the mayor's daughter makes a passionate advance, but Jaime does not pay attention to her since he prefers Silvia, the Governor's daughter. When it is Silvia's time, Jaime confesses his love for her and they begin to have a passionate moment, until the governor's wife arrives and she finds them. Jaime, as ambassador, expresses his intentions to marry the governor's daughter and he accepts the decision very happily. Despite being in love with Silvia, that night Jaime meets Almícar again at the Termales de Rivera and tells him that it is time to end the deception. To which Almícar plans to go to the hotel the next day with a telegram informing the ambassador that he must return to Bogotá immediately. At the hot springs, the former seminary classmate sees Jaime again with Almícar and is convinced that Jaime is an imposter.

The next day, the governor and the local authorities plan to take the ambassador to a cultural picnic in the most prominent places in the Huila department, so they leave early and do not allow time for Almícar to deliver the telegram. During the trip they visit places such as Garzón, the Strait of Magdalena and the San Agustín Archaeological Park, Jaime begins to have disturbing visions of the statues of San Agustín, of the people and of how the deception has been carried out, and his greatest desire is to end all the deception. That night while they were sleeping in a camp made for the occasion, Jaime tries to look for Silvia to sleep with her, but the two merchants he met at the beginning arrive at the camp with the telegram from Almícar who gave the instructions for the ambassador to return to Bogotá immediately. The next day and first thing in the morning, the entire entourage begins the trip back to Neiva, but upon arriving at the hotel, they meet the former colleague, who had taken advantage of the ambassador's absence to enter the room and find his documents to prove the whole deception. Jaime, now discovered, admits that everything was a hoax and is immediately arrested by the police and sent to prison.

The governor and the local authorities are offended and totally embarrassed by what happened, especially Silvia who suffers the most for having been deceived by Jaime. However, the people of the city took what happened with humor because they saw what Jaime did as a lesson. José María, also deceived by what happened, kicks the two merchants out of his shop and ends his business relationship with them. The judge observes that Jaime never presented himself as ambassador of India and had defrauded no one, and Jaime returned the clothes and the gifts, Almícar paid the hotel bill, and made the decision to release him and order his expulsion from the city. Jaime is freed and leaves the city in the middle of a celebration organized by Almícar and the people of the city in his honor.

In the closing credits he says that three months later a real ambassador arrived in the city. When they told the Governor, he replied: Tell him to eat...

== Cast ==
- Hugo Gomez.... Jaime Florez Torres 'Maharajá Rama Ahujama, the Indian ambassador'
- Olga Lucía Alvira....Silvia, Governor's daughter
- Manuel Pachón....Governor of Huila
- Lucero Gómez.... Governor's wife
- Rafaél Bohorquez....Municipal judge
- Edgardo Román....Amilkar
- José María Arzuaga....José María, owner of 'El Marquéz' fine clothing
