= La mujer del presidente =

- Title card
- Genre: Drama
- Created by: Mauricio Miranda (original idea); Mauricio Navas (original idea)
- Written by: Mauricio Miranda; Mauricio Navas
- Directed by: Magdalena La Rotta
- Starring: Róbinson Díaz; Sandra Reyes; Jorge Cao; Elluz Peraza
- Country of origin: Colombia
- Original language: Spanish
- No. of episodes: 63

Production
- Producer: Diana Bustamante
- Production locations: Bogotá, Colombia
- Editor: Sebastián Hernández Z.
- Camera setup: Multicamera
- Running time: 45 minutes
- Production company: Caracol Televisión

Original release
- Network: Canal 1 Caracol
- Release: July 17, 1997 – October 10, 1998

La mujer del presidente (English: The wife of the president) is a Colombian television series produced and broadcast by Caracol Televisión. It was broadcast from July 1997 through October 1998.

== Plot ==
Carlos Alberto Buendía, a systems engineer, works at the Concorde Persona airline, and apparently his life is almost perfect; He is secretly married to his girlfriend Adriana Guerrero, a law student and airline receptionist, for which he obtains a bank loan to buy an apartment and for both of them to have a life together. About to get a promotion, Susana Vivas de Acero, wife of Francisco de Paula Acero, powerful womanizer and corrupt president of the airline, appears in Carlos Alberto's life. Susana tries to seduce Carlos Alberto and about to have sex at Carlos Alberto's house, Susana suddenly dies. Terrified by what happened, Carlos Alberto fearing losing everything he has achieved, buries the corpse on the outskirts of the city, being the beginning of a chain of misfortunes in the life of Buendía who ends up in jail for a crime he did not commit and he must to probe his innocence in the midst of a corrupt justice (where he is guilty until proven otherwise) and where his family and close friends will be in danger of death. The story follows these movements: 1) Carlos Alberto's life before and after Susana's death. 2) His capture and stay in jail with his friend Víctor Leal, both being harassed by the corrupt jailer captain Hugo Escobar. 3) The jailbreak and hiding. 4) His relationship with Robin. 5) The help of the chief thief Villanueva. 6) His faked death of him. 7) His recapture and subsequent judgment.

== Cast ==
- Robinson Diaz.....Carlos Alberto Buendia
- Cristina Umaña ... Robin
- Sandra Reyes.....Adriana Guerrero
- Elluz Peraza.....Susana de Acero (commits suicide)
- Jorge Cao.....Francisco de Paula Acero
- Marlon Moreno.....Victor Leal (murdered by Captain Escobar)
- Silvio Angel.....Julio Buendia (Carlos Alberto's father)
- Ana Maria Arango.....Emperatriz Serrano de Buendia (Carlos Alberto's mother)
- Lucy Martinez.....Beatriz 'Betty' (Adriana's mother)
- Roberto Cano.....Andrés Acero (son of Francisco de Paula and Susana)
- Rafael Martinez.....Paulino Díaz
- Celmira Luzardo.....Luz de Caballero
- Waldo Urrego.....Captain Hugo Escobar
- Fabio Rubiano.....Rigoberto Bernal
