= Alejandra Franco =

Mexican footballer (born 1995)

Personal information
- Full name: Alejandra Franco Gómez
- Date of birth: 3 December 1995 (age 30)
- Place of birth: Guadalajara, Jalisco, Mexico
- Height: 1.63 m (5 ft 4 in)
- Position: Right back

Senior career*
| Years | Team | Apps | (Gls) |
| 2018–2024 | Atlas | 122 | (5) |
| 2024–2025 | Atlético San Luis | 18 | (0) |
- * Club domestic league appearances and goals as of 4 June 2023

Alejandra Franco Gómez (born 3 December 1995) is a Mexican professional footballer who plays as a Right back.

== Club career ==
In 2018, she started her career in Atlas. In 2024, she was transferred to Atlético San Luis.
