= Newly Rich, Newly Poor (2007 TV series) =

Colombian telenovela

- Spanish: Nuevo rico, nuevo pobre
- Genre: Telenovela
- Opening theme: "Nadie sabe lo que tiene" by David Castro
- Country of origin: Colombia
- Original language: Spanish
- No. of seasons: 1
- No. of episodes: 194 for Colombia and 158 International

Original release
- Network: Caracol Televisión
- Release: 16 July 2007 – 11 August 2008

Related
- Pobre rico, pobre; Pobre rico; Newly Rich, Newly Poor (2025 TV series)

Nuevo Rico Nuevo Pobre is a Colombian telenovela produced and broadcast by Caracol TV starring Martín Karpan, John Alex Toro (well known by his participation in Maria Full of Grace), Maria Cecilia Botero, Carolina Acevedo, Hugo Gómez, former Miss Colombia Andrea Nocetti and Andrés Toro (from Sin Tetas No Hay Paraíso).

The show started on 16 July 2007 on Caracol TV. Caracol TV has sold the rights of the show to Telemundo and Fox. It is, as of May 2008, one of the highest rated TV shows in Colombia.

== Plot ==
The telenovela follows the lives of Andrés Ferreira and Brayan Galindo, who were switched at birth. Andrés, born to a poor couple, was raised by a wealthy family, while Brayan, born into wealth, was raised by a poor couple. After 30 years, the mistake is discovered, and the two adults are forced to switch places. Andrés moves in with his biological father at the pension where Brayan had lived and begins to meet his true family, while Brayan goes to live with his real mother and his new fiancée, Fernanda Sanmiguel, who is only interested in him for his wealth and is secretly having an affair with Andrés's cousin, Mateo. Brayan now owns the Ferreira family business, Mundo Express, but it is later revealed that Mateo is plotting to steal both his money and the company.

== Cultural aspects ==
The name of Brayan Galindo reflects an irregular adaptation of Brian to Spanish.

The social consequences of massive dismissals of 200 employees as a result of restructuring inserts a dramatic effect into the plot, and creates a cold image of the business world and Andrés Ferreira.

== Cast ==
- Martín Karpan - Andres Galindo
- Jhon Alex Toro - Brayan Ferreira
- Carolina Acevedo - Rosemary Peláez
- Andrea Nocetti - Fernanda Sanmiguel
- Andrés Toro - Mateo Lopez Ferreira
- Maria Cecilia Botero - Antonia Vda. de Ferreira
- Hugo Gómez - Leonidas Galindo
- Diana Neira - Ingrid Peláez
- Rosemary Bohórquez - Maritza Buenahora
- Isabel Cristina Estrada - lizeth
- Liliana Escobar - Esperanza Romero de Galindo
- Andrés Parra - Orlando Araújo
- Mauricio Vélez - Fidel Peláez
- Hermes Camelo - Edmundo Gonzaga †
- Juan Carlos Pérez Almanza - Malaleche
- Jimmy Vásquez - Miller Anselmo
- Lorena Tobar - Florens
- Carlos Serrato - Dr. Trujillo
- Edna Márquez - Roberta
- Nataly Umaña - Llona
- Saín Castro. - Anselmo Afanador
- Jorge Sánchez Salsa - Héctor
- Gerardo Calero - Emilio
- Herbert King. - Hugo
- John Mario Rivera - Julio Landazuri
- Fernando Arango - "Peluche"
- Harold Córdoba - "El Mono"
- Natalie Ackermann - Astrid Jeunger alias
- Maribel Abello - Deyanira Puyana De Sanmiguel
- Vicki Rueda - Diana Inés Martínez
- Astrid Junguito - Genoveva Carranza
- Jarold Fonseca - Pachón
- Pacho Rueda - Policía Casper

== International remakes ==
=== Greece – Ela sti thesi mou ===
Premiered on Alpha TV on 3 October 2016 and ended on 9 July 2021, counting 5 seasons and 934 episodes.

=== Serbia – Igra Sudbine ===
Premiered on Prva Srpska Televizija on 20 January 2020 and it is still being broadcast, counting 1300+ episodes and 8 seasons.
