= Caracol Televisión =

Colombian television network

Coordinates: 4°41′38″N 74°4′27″W

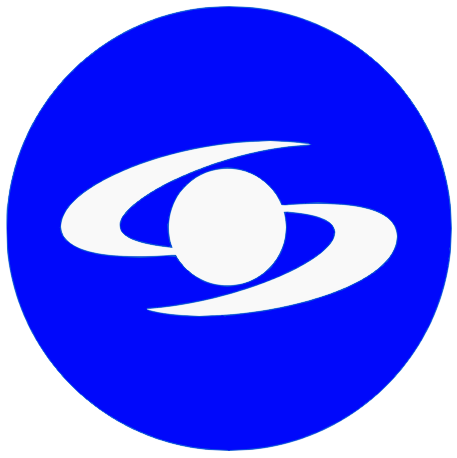
- Logo used since 2025
- Type: Free-to-air television network
- Country: Colombia
- Broadcast area: Colombia

Programming
- Language: Spanish
- Picture format: 1080i HDTV (downscaled to 480i for the SDTV feed)

Ownership
- Owner: Caracol Televisión S.A. (Valorem)
- Key people: Gonzalo Córdoba Mallarino, CEO; Alejandro Santo Domingo, director
- Sister channels: Caracol Internacional; Novelas Caracol

History
- Founded: August 28, 1969 (as a television production company)
- Launched: July 10, 1998 (as a television network)

Links
- Website: caracoltv.com

Availability

Terrestrial
- Analog VHF/UHF: Listings may vary
- Digital UHF: Channel 14.1 (HD); Channel 14.2 (HD2); Channel 14.3 (SD)

Caracol Televisión (Spanish pronunciation: [kaɾaˈkol teleβiˈsjon]) (known as Caracol and previously as Canal Caracol) is a Colombian free-to-air television network owned by Caracol Medios, a unit of Grupo Valorem. It is one of the leading private TV networks in Colombia, alongside Canal RCN and Canal 1. The network distributes and produces 5,000+ programs and has aired in more than 80 countries.

== History ==
=== As a programadora ===
Caracol Televisión, as it is known today, began to take shape in 1954, when the Organization Radiodifusora Caracol offered to the Televisora Nacional (the then only TV channel in Colombia later turned into Inravisión, today RTVC Sistema de Medios Publicos) a formula to sustain its operation by means of the concession of certain programming spaces for commercial exploitation. At that time, executives Fernando Londoño Henao, Cayetano Betancur, Carlos Sanz de Santamaria, Pedro Navias and Germán Montoya began to raise the possibility of establishing the first television programming company (or programadora). A year later, in 1955, this idea was accepted; it was decided the rights would be split with the national broadcaster, creating TVC (Televisión Comercial Limitada).

In 1967, the National Institute of Radio and Television, Inravisión, which at the time operated the Canal Nacional, awarded by means of a tender to TVC 45 hours of programming a week.

In September 1969, TVC was transformed into Caracol Televisión S.A., with the primary objective of marketing and producing television programs.

In 1972, Campeones de la risa was born, later known as Sábados felices, a humor program directed by Alfonso Lizarazo until the end of the 1990s, and which still continues in the air as of 2020. Caracol TV steadily increased its programming output and by the late 1980s it was producing the 20:00 telenovela, a slot including San Tropel, Quieta Margarita, Música Maestro, and Calamar, among others.

Caracol TV was one of the Colombian programadoras which belonged to the Organización de Televisión Iberoamericana as the OTI Colombia consortium, allowing it to become one of the rights holders for the Olympic Games and the FIFA World Cup.

In 1987, the Santo Domingo Group (today Valórem) acquired the shareholding control and begins a technological and administrative modernization.

During the tender that awarded the television spots between 1992 and 1997 in Colombian television, the company became one of the largest concessionaires, with their programs broadcast exclusively in Cadena Uno, now Canal Uno.

=== As a national private TV network ===
In development of a new legislation that allowed the concession to private operators of the television service, on November 24, 1997, Caracol Televisión received one of the two awards to operate as "national channel of private operation" for 10 years by the then National Television Commission (CNTV, later ANTV), the other license being granted to rival RCN Televisión. Under the chairmanship of Mábel García de Ángel, an expansion plan was implemented, in order to ensure that the infrastructure that up until that time served to produce ten and a half hours of weekly programming would reach the capacity to produce and have 18 hours a day of general programming on the air as of July 1998.

The channel began test broadcasting as an independent channel on June 10, 1998, with the live broadcast of the opening ceremony of the 1998 FIFA World Cup in France and reruns of some productions from its catalogue when it was previously a programadora. Caracol Televisión has held the broadcasting rights for the matches of the Colombia national football team under the Gol Caracol banner since 1992.

On July 10, 1998, regular broadcasts began. The signal was initially seen in Bogotá, Medellín, Cali, Pereira, Manizales and Armenia, later expanding to the rest of the country. Caracol TV and RCN TV, the holders of the only private national TV concessions, form a duopoly on Colombian national television, after an economic crisis hit Canal A and Cadena Uno, the mixed system national channels, in the early 2000s.

Distribution and productions agreements were signed with Tepuy, an international television marketing company, in 2000, and with Walt Disney International through its Buena Vista International label, in 2001, which resulted in the telenovela La baby sister. In the same year, Caracol TV sealed a content alliance with RTI Colombia and Telemundo.

Sister company Caracol Radio became part of the Spanish Grupo PRISA in 2003, ending its formal commercial ties with Caracol Televisión, which is allowed to use the Caracol brand through a special agreement.

Through its newscast Noticias Caracol, the network is part of the Alianza Informativa Latinoamericana, a news exchange service formed in 2005 which includes the American network CBS among its members.

In 2007, the construction of its new headquarters in the La Floresta sector, Suba, north-western Bogotá, with an estimated cost of 30 million dollars, was completed.

In 2008, Caracol Televisión, and its subsidiaries Caracol TV América Corp. and Caracol Televisión Inc., formed one of the five largest production and distribution companies in Latin America, with a presence in more than 50 countries worldwide. In February 2009, a new cable channel called Novelas Caracol began broadcasts, carrying old and more recent telenovelas, available to subscribers of some cable operators in Colombia.

Digital terrestrial television broadcasts, using the DVB-T standard, began in 2010.

In August 2011, Caracol signed an agreement with the Arirang TV channel, operated by the Korea International Broadcasting Foundation, which would allow the two networks to cover news, sports and other topics of general interest, as well as the exchange of cultural, artistic, scientific, sports, news and other aspects when they require it, while they will join for the co-production of television programs.

In 2012 Valórem returned to the radio business with the creation of the Bluradio network, a subsidiary of Caracol TV. A second service, music station La Kalle, began in 2016.

In April 2014 Caracol TV decided to pull its HD feed from the main Colombian cable and satellite TV operators, demanding the payment of a fee, though the signal returned briefly for the 2014 FIFA World Cup; afterwards, it was pulled again. The HD feed returned to the operators, after a ruling by the Supreme Court of Bogotá and the Superintendency of Industry and Commerce, in 2017.

Shortly before the beginning of the 2014 FIFA World Cup, Caracol HD2, a digital subchannel carrying some sports events and simulcasting the main HD feed the rest of the time, was launched. On September 14, 2016, a third digital subchannel simulcasting La Kalle programming started broadcasting.

In November 2014, Caracol acquired an application developed by Gil Rabbi in collaboration with the Keshet franchise, for the interactive TV game show TOUCH. It was aired live every evening on prime time.

On June 12, 2015, Caracol Televisión, Caracol TV América Corp and Caracol Televisión Inc, launched Caracol TV Medios, an umbrella brand with a portfolio of television channels and radio stations in Colombia.

In August 2016, the aspect ratio for the standard definition feed was modified to 16:9.

After a multi-year absence, the network plans to bring the Olympic Games back to Colombian television starting with Tokyo 2020.

== Radio ==
In July 2012, Caracol TV rented HJMD from Cadena Melodía, which became the first flagship of the Bluradio network (current flagship is HJCK). A second service, music station La Kalle, began in 2016.

== WGEN-TV ==
In December 2005, Caracol TV bought a 25% stake in Miami television station WGEN-TV. Programming on WGEN included Colombian and Brazilian telenovelas as well as a news program produced in Colombia. The station also produced a local version of Desafío 20.06, a reality show similar to Survivor, and an original US-produced variety comedy series entitled La Boca Loca de Paul, hosted by Paul Bouche. Some of Caracol TV's telenovelas were remade for MyNetworkTV in the US, such as Desire, based on Mesa Para Tres (Table for Three).

The station became an affiliate of MundoFox (later MundoMax), a network linked to its Colombian rival RCN TV, since 2012 until its demise in 2016. Later it affiliated to Azteca América, becoming an independent again in 2017.

In 2018, WGEN was sold to Liberman Broadcasting, and became an owned-and-operated station of Estrella TV.

== See also ==
- Noticias Caracol
- Caracol Internacional
- Television in Colombia
- List of Caracol Televisión telenovelas and series
