= The Queen of Flow season 3 =

2026 Colombian television season

The Queen of Flow
- Season 3
- Starring: Carlos Torres; Carolina Ramírez; Marcelo Dos Santos; Allison Joan
- No. of episodes: 65

Release
- Original network: Caracol Televisión
- Original release: 13 January – 21 April 2026

Season chronology
- ← Previous; Season 2

The third season of the Colombian television series The Queen of Flow was announced on 17 September 2024. The season is directed by Carlos Mario Urrea, Andrés López and Harold Ariza, with Andrés Biermann serving as executive producer.

The show's third season stars Carolina Ramírez and Carlos Torres. It premiered on Caracol Televisión on 13 January 2026.

== Cast ==
- Carlos Torres as Carlos Cruz "Charly Flow"
- Carolina Ramírez as Yeimy Montoya
- Marcelo Dos Santos as Mike Rivera
- Allison Joan as Yara "Sky" Giraldo Piedrahita
- Mariana Gomez as Irma Serna Suárez "El Huracán"
- Juan Manuel Restrepo as Erik Mateo Cruz Montoya "Pez Koi"
- Marcos Carreño "Kiño" as Axel
- Juan Palau as Drama Key
- Adriana Arango as Ligia de Cruz
- Juana Arboleda as Brenda Piedrahita
- Carlos Fernández as Ángel Botero
- Michell Orozco as Soraya Giraldo
- Rami Herrera as Genoveva Vallejo
- Pedro Pablo Ochoa Quijano as El Búho
- Manolo Alzamora as Jerónimo Vallejo
- Santiago Cano "Rapza" as Riquelmi
- Eduardo Pérez as Rusvel Perlaza
- Mauricio Cújar as Fredy Giraldo
- Luna Victoria as Alma Cruz Montoya

== Episodes ==
No. overall	No. in season	Title	Original release date	Colombia viewers (Rating points)
173	1	"Charly emprende la búsqueda para encontrar a Yeimy"	13 January 2026	7.4
174	2	"Charly suspende su gira tras la desaparición de Yeimy"	14 January 2026	5.9
175	3	"Dejan de buscar a Yeimy, pero Charly hace plan para dar con ella"	15 January 2026	5.9
176	4	"El pasado vuelve a tocar la puerta de Charly en medio de la desaparición de Yeimy"	16 January 2026	6.4
177	5	"Yeimy aparece viva en la selva, pero no recuerda quién es"	19 January 2026	6.8
178	6	"Sky entra a Soul & Bass y empieza a trabajar con Charly"	20 January 2026	5.8
179	7	"Explota bomba en la casa de Charly y Ángel queda herido"	21 January 2026	5.7
180	8	"Charly y la familia dan por muerta a Yeimy y hacen entierro"	22 January 2026	5.6
181	9	"Yeimy se entera de que es famosa, intenta escapar y la hieren"	23 January 2026	5.5
182	10	"Yeimy tiene grave herida en la cabeza, luego de golpe, y está muy mal"	26 January 2026	5.9
183	11	"Sale a la luz video del accidente de Yeimy y le arruinan momento a Charly"	27 January 2026	6.2
184	12	"Sky se queda a dormida en casa de Charly y Soraya se pone celosa"	28 January 2026	5.7
185	13	"Sky confiesa que siente algo por Charly e intenta alejarse"	29 January 2026	5.7
186	14	"Charly lucha por su vida, luego de recibir una puñalada"	30 January 2026	6.6
187	15	"Charly despierta en el hospital y Sky renuncia a Soul & Bass"	2 February 2026	6.0
188	16	"Charly le pide a Sky que vuelva a Soul & Bass"	3 February 2026	5.9
189	17	"Ligia pelea con Charly por conexión que él tiene con Sky"	4 February 2026	5.6
190	18	"Charly empieza a sentir cosas por Sky y pasan día familiar con Alma"	5 February 2026	5.6
191	19	"Charly piensa que Sky es aliada de Mike y lo está traicionando"	6 February 2026	5.6
192	20	"Charly le dice a Sky que ya no va a ser el productor de su álbum"	9 February 2026	6.3
193	21	"Sky besa a Charly y le confiesa que está enamorada de él"	10 February 2026	6.5
194	22	"Hieren a Erik y le dicen a Charly que hay un infiltrado en Soul & Bass"	11 February 2026	6.1
195	23	"Yeimy se entera de que Charly es su esposo y Erik, su hijo"	12 February 2026	6.4
196	24	"Yeimy regresa a Medellín y tiene un recuerdo cantando con Charly"	13 February 2026	5.6
197	25	"Charly y Sky se dejan llevar y dan rienda suelta a la pasión"	16 February 2026	6.6
198	26	"Irma se entera de que Yeimy está viva, luego de que es raptada"	17 February 2026	6.9
199	27	"Charly se acerca al paradero de Yeimy e Irma"	18 February 2026	5.6
200	28	"Yeimy se entera de la relación de Charly y Sky"	19 February 2026	5.4
201	29	"Yeimy intenta escapar de la prisión de Mike, pero está muy débil"	20 February 2026	5.8
202	30	"Yeimy e Irma regresan a casa tras huir de Mike"	23 February 2026	6.9
203	31	"Yeimy sale del hospital y se reencuentra con Charly"	24 February 2026	6.8
204	32	"Yeimy conoce a Sky tras la salida de Charly de la cárcel"	25 February 2026	6.3
205	33	"Yeimy es diagnosticada con rara enfermedad"	26 February 2026	5.7
206	34	"Yeimy viaja a Guatapé y se entera de dolorosa noticia"	27 February 2026	6.4
207	35	"Mike sabotea el concierto que marca el regreso de Yeimy"	2 March 2026	5.8
208	36	"Yeimy sufre una descompensación en el concierto"	3 March 2026	5.5
209	37	"El secreto sobre la salud de Yeimy se convierte en una bomba de tiempo"	4 March 2026	5.9
210	38	"Yeimy le pide a Charly escoger entre ella y Sky"	5 March 2026	5.7
211	39	"Yeimy se desmaya en pleno espectáculo frente a Charly"	6 March 2026	5.1
212	40	"Charly se entera que Yeimy morirá pronto debido a su enfermedad"	9 March 2026	5.8
213	41	"Yeimy muere rodeada de sus seres queridos"	10 March 2026	5.5
214	42	"Charly, Erick y toda la familia despiden a Yeimy en su funeral"	11 March 2026	5.9
215	43	"Sky renuncia a Soul & Bass tras la muerte de Yeimy"	12 March 2026	6.1
216	44	"Irma y Sky pelean por quién reemplazará a Yeimy"	13 March 2026	5.7
217	45	"Aspa culpa públicamente a Mike por la muerte de Yeimy"	16 March 2026	5.2
218	46	"Aspa, controlado por Mike, acusa a Charly de planear la muerte de Yeimy"	17 March 2026	5.0
219	47	"Mike le tiende una trampa a Charly, y Ángel queda herido"	18 March 2026	5.5
220	48	"Irma y Sky hacen las paces tras enfrentamiento en público"	19 March 2026	5.4
221	49	"Charly encuentra a Sky besándose con Meteoro"	20 March 2026	5.4
222	50	"Charly anuncia que sacará nuevo álbum en honor a Yeimy"	24 March 2026	5.2
223	51	"Ligia descubre que Aspa en realidad es Charly"	25 March 2026	5.3
224	52	"Charly es citado por Botero a dar una declaración libre"	27 March 2026	4.9
225	53	"Genoveva le propone a Charly aliarse en contra de Mike"	30 March 2026	4.6
226	54	"Video del secuestro de Yeimy e Irma sale a la luz"	31 March 2026	4.3
227	55	"Charly ve el video del secuestro de Irma y Yeimy"	1 April 2026	5.4
228	56	"Mike es capturado en medio del secuestro de Sky"	6 April 2026	5.0
229	57	"Sale a la luz el secuestro de Sky a manos de Mike"	7 April 2026	4.6
230	58	"Mike es condenado a 20 años de prisión sin medida de excarcelación"	8 April 2926	5.4
231	59	"Erick le propone matrimonio a Irma en una romántica cena"	9 April 2026	4.8
232	60	"Genoveva secuestra a Charly y se lleva susto por posible sobredosis"	13 April 2026	4.9
233	61	"Genoveva le confiesa a Charly que es la mente maestra de los planes de Mike"	15 April 2026	4.3
234	62	"Charly le deja a su familia una carta de despedida"	16 April 2026	4.9
235	63	"Sky descubre pista en la carta de Charly y lo rescata"	17 April 2026	4.9
236	64	"Genoveva ejecuta su plan de envenenar a Charly y su familia"	20 April 2026	5.2
237	65	"Erick e Irma se casan en la espera de un bebé"	21 April 2026	5.8

== Production ==
On 17 September 2024, Caracol Televisión renewed The Queen of Flow for a third season. Filming of the season began on 12 November 2024.

== Release ==
In Colombia, the season premiered on 13 January 2026. Internationally, the season premiered on Netflix on 14 January 2026, with nineteen new episodes, followed by twenty-one episodes on 8 February, and twenty-five episodes on 10 March.
