= Francisco el Matemático =

Colombian telenovela

- Main title card used in the first season
- Genre: Telenovela
- Written by: Ana María Parra (1999–2003); Diego Vivanco (1999–2003); Sandra Rita Paba (1999–2001); Silvia Londoño (1999–2004); Elkin Opina (1999–2004); Fernan Rivera (1999–2004)
- Directed by: Toni Navia (1999–2004); Yuldor Gutiérrez (1999–2004); Consuelo González (1999–2004)
- Creative directors: Diego López; Adriana Suarez; Gonzalo Martínez; Julián Ortiz
- Music by: Nicolás Uribe
- Opening theme: "Revoliático" by Los Melódicos
- Country of origin: Colombia
- Original language: Spanish
- No. of seasons: 6
- No. of episodes: 768

Production
- Executive producers: Fabio Cuellar (1999–2004); Ana Peralta (1999–2004); Alejandro Torres (1999–2004); César Rincón (1999–2004)
- Editors: César Barreto; Marcela Vázquez
- Production company: RCN Televisión

Original release
- Network: RCN Televisión
- Release: May 1999 – October 2004

Related
- Francisco el Matemático: Clase 2017; Clase 406

Francisco el Matemático, also known as Francisco el Matemático: Clase 2004 for the sixth season, is a Colombian teen drama television series produced and broadcast by RCN Televisión between May 1999 to October 2004. The series revolves around Francisco, a young math teacher who must deal with the personal problems of his high school students. The series is considered one of the most watched productions of Colombian television, together with Padres e hijos. After its resounding success, in 2004, Pedro Damián of Televisa produces a Mexican version of the series with the title of Clase 406.

On 10 November 2016, it was confirmed that the series had been revived in a new sequel. Which consists of 73 episodes and premiered on 13 February 2017, and concluded on 2 June 2017. Due to the low ratings that the sequel had, it was canceled after 73 episodes aired.

The main character of Francisco el Matemático, was played by 4 actors, initially starting with Luis Mesa as Francisco Restrepo, who was in the series from 1999 to 2000. Following him, Ricardo Vélez assumed the leading role as Juan Francisco Reyes during the years 2001 and 2003. In 2004, due to the low rating of the series, it was canceled, but during that year the title was changed to Francisco el matemático: Clase 2004, and the main character was played by Alejandro Martínez as Francisco Santamaría. 13 years later after the series' cancellation, Carlos Torres resumed the character as Francisco Quintana in a new sequel.

== Premise ==
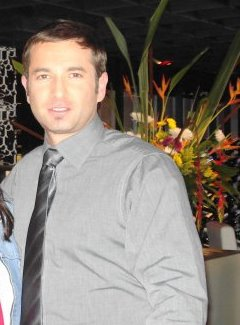
Luis Mesa played Francisco Restrepo during the years 1999 to 2000.

The story focuses on a district educational institution located in the south of Bogotá, where Francisco Restrepo (Luis Mesa) is hired to be a ninth grade math teacher. His work environment was shared among outstanding students, extroverts and rebels. In addition to delving into the teacher's private situations, the series also focused on some students such as Gabriela (Diana Ángel), Magdalena (Verónica Orozco), Elkin (Manuel José Chávez), Carlos (Óscar Mauricio Rodríguez), Marcela (Lina María Luna), Fernando (Jorge Monterrosa), Jhonatan (Jacques Toukhmanian), among others. For Francisco, teaching in a district school became complicated due to the rebel attitudes of some students, which in some cases ended in fights. His integral character in his work as a teacher, made him a conciliator of conflicts, so that over time he would become friends with these students. Inside the school, he met his co-worker named Adriana (Alejandra Borrero) with whom they would make a friendship that would last until Francisco Restrepo left the series.

The series focused on the personal life of a student named Gabriela, who was characterized by being intelligent, prominent and leading her group. A fact would change his life, at the beginning of the series was violated by a Physical Education teacher named Dago (Mario Duarte). After this fact, she decided to have her son at an age as hard as 14 years. Her life as a student and mother was gradually assimilating, until she graduated from high school and continued her studies of social communication.

Initially, it began as a miniseries of 10 chapters aired every week on Saturdays, produced in an agreement between RCN Televisión and the Institute of Education of Bogotá; but due to the success, it was decided to increase to 20 chapters, to later become in the year 2000 a series of daily broadcast. Each season of the series was equivalent to one academic school year, that is, between 1999 and 2001 the series was developed whose students were in ninth grade of Secondary Basic Education, tenth and eleventh grade of Vocational Middle Education. When the promotion of students of the 2001 season came out, the 2002 season was divided between: Gabriela's friends who were in eleventh grade, Gabriela's life in the university, the life in the army of Jhon Mario, Carlos and Fercho who lent mandatory military service, and other friends of Gabriela who were undecided with their lives after school.

Unknown that the series was going to last several more seasons, its main actor Luis Mesa left the series in 2000 to work in other productions, and was replaced by actor Ricardo Vélez under the name of Juan Francisco Reyes. The producers decided to maintain the original essence of an integral professor, except that he taught Spanish and literature classes, and this was not an impediment for the series to continue calling himself Francisco el matemático. After the departure of Ricardo Vélez who ran with the same fate as his predecessor, the last actor to replace him until the end was Alejandro Martínez with the name of Francisco Santamaría.

In addition to unwanted pregnancies, Francisco el matemático touched on issues closely linked to today's youth such as: intrafamily violence, drug addiction, alcoholism, couple conflicts, prostitution and school dropout, issues that today continue to occupy the first plans of the media of the country. The intention of the series was to awaken and raise awareness about the most common problems of Colombian youth, so that new generations understand these situations and can travel the right path in their personal lives. In 2004, the sixth season was aired, although it was not very successful and they decided to cancel the series.
