= Nintendomanía =

Mexican TV program

- Genre: Entertainment and Spectacles
- Presented by: Gus Rodríguez (1995–2000); Mark Tacher (1996–1998); Maggie Hegyi (1996–1998); Daniel Avilés (1998–2000); Alejandra Urdiain (1998–2000)
- Country of origin: Mexico
- Original language: Spanish

Production
- Production company: TV Azteca

Original release
- Network: Azteca Trece; Azteca 7
- Release: March 25, 1995 – July 20, 2000

Related
- Intercontrol

Nintendomanía is a Mexican video game-oriented television program broadcast between 1995 and 2000. The theme of the program was the video games of the Nintendo franchise and its existing consoles such as the NES, SNES, Game Boy, Virtual Boy and Nintendo 64.

It began on TV Azteca in 1995 on Saturday mornings, and was originally presented by Gustavo "Gus" Rodríguez and his son Gustavo Javier Rodríguez Ávila (who appeared in the credits as Javier R. Ávila) and during the program sometimes simply He called him "Chavo" later Maggie Hegyi, Mark Tacher, Daniel Avilés and Alejandra Urdiain joined.

The last program was broadcast on July 22, 2000. The program ended due to structural changes in sales by TV Azteca and Nintendo's refusal to contribute a greater economic amount.

== History ==
It began transmissions on March 25, 1995 with a duration of 30 minutes per program; In it, reviews of the new games that came out on the market were made, the new technological advances of the consoles and titles were analyzed, tips and tricks were provided for the most popular games, and special reports of events related to the game industry were made video games, including E3. From 1995 to 1998, the program was broadcast on Azteca Trece, and from 1998 until its end on Azteca 7.

During the first broadcasts of Nintendomania, the scenery was rudimentary, it had airbrush-based illustrations on the walls, brick-like furniture elements and other paraphernalia alluding to games like Super Mario Bros., Mario Kart and Mortal Kombat (1992), among others. The two presenters who appeared were just Gus and his son Javier, whom Gus frequently referred to as Chavo. The program's logo was the words "Nintendo" and "Manía" in orange, later the word "Nintendo" was replaced by the official logo of said company and the word "Manía" was given the five colors of the TV Azteca's logo.
