= Secretos del paraíso =

Television series

- Genre: Telenovela
- Developed by: Vista Productions
- Written by: Camila Brugés; Natalia Ospina
- Story by: Mónica Agudelo
- Directed by: Carlos Cock; Pepe Sánchez
- Creative director: Lucas Jaramillo Vélez
- Starring: See list
- Theme music composer: César Escola; Sonia Arrubla
- Opening theme: "La maldición del paraíso" performed by Alejandro Martínez
- Country of origin: Colombia
- Original language: Spanish
- No. of episodes: 182

Production
- Executive producer: Jaime Sanchez Cristo
- Producers: Cyndi Rojas; María Fernanda Bateman; Silvia Durán
- Production locations: Bogotá; Medellín; Santa Marta; New York City
- Cinematography: Yon Franco; Jaime Gavilán
- Editor: Marcela Vásquez
- Camera setup: Multi-camera

Original release
- Network: RCN Televisión
- Release: November 10, 2014 – August 21, 2015

Secretos del paraíso is a Colombian telenovela produced by Vista Productions for RCN Televisión. It is an adaptation of the telenovela produced in 1993, La maldición del paraíso. The series debuted first in MundoFox on July 22, 2013, while in Colombia it was released on November 10, 2014, and its last episode was aired on August 21, 2015. The series had a total of 182 episodes in Colombia.

The series is starring Juan Pablo Espinosa as Cristóbal, Natalia Durán as Victoria and Iván López as Alejandro.

== Plot ==
Victoria Márquez is a successful woman in the fashion industry who owns a modeling agency. She is preparing to marry Alejandro Soler, whom she believes is in love with her. Their marriage is also expected to strengthen the business partnership between Victoria's mother and Alejandro, who jointly own Santana & Soler, an advertising agency described as one of the leading firms in Latin America.

== Cast ==
=== Main ===
- Juan Pablo Espinosa as Cristóbal Soler
- Natalia Durán as Victoria Márquez
- Iván López as Alejandro Soler
- Jorge Cao as Guillermo
- Silvia De Dios as Eugenia
- Patricia Tamayo as Helena de Soler
- Gloria Gómez as Fernanda Soler
- Marcela Gallego as Esmeralda
- Ernesto Benjumea as Ricardo
- Alina Lozano as Mercedes
- Carlos Hurtado as Roberto
- Linda Baldrich as Lucía
- Juan Fernando Sánchez as Federico
- Carlos Torres as Julián Márquez
- María José Martínez as María del Pilar “Mapi” Cortéz Espinosa
- Mateo Rueda as Daniel
- Susana Rojas as Marisol
- Lisbeth Cepeda as Azucena

=== Recurring ===
- Estefanía Borge as Mariana
- Jhao Salinas as Marcelo
- Germán Quintero as Manuel
- Liz Bazurto as Sonia
- Diana Wiswell as Rubí

== Ratings ==
Season	Timeslot (ET)	Episodes	First aired		Last aired	
Season	Timeslot (ET)	Episodes	Date	Viewers (millions)	Date	Viewers (millions)
1	Mon–Fri 8:00pm	182	November 10, 2014	4.7	August 21, 2015	7.3
