= The Queen of Flow season 2 =

2021 Colombian television season

The Queen of Flow
- Season 2
- No. of episodes: 90

Release
- Original network: Caracol Televisión
- Original release: 26 April – 10 September 2021

The second season of the Colombian television series The Queen of Flow, aired in Colombia on Caracol Televisión from 26 April 2021 to 10 September 2021. The season follows Yeimy Montoya (Carolina Ramírez), who after achieving fame and success in music she decides to give herself a chance in love with Juancho Mesa (Andrés Sandoval), not knowing that soon in her life, an enemy who knows her and all her loved ones very well. Meanwhile, Carlos Cruz/Charly Flow (Carlos Torres) makes merits to get out of prison.

The season was ordered in October 2018 and production started in January 2020. Subsequently, it had to be postponed due to several cases of coronavirus as a result of the COVID-19 pandemic in Colombia and activities were resumed in October of that same year.

== Cast ==
- Carolina Ramírez as Yeimy Montoya
- Carlos Torres as Carlos Cruz "Charly Flow"
- Andrés Sandoval as Juan Camilo Mesa "Juancho"
- Adriana Arango as Ligia de Cruz
- Lucho Velasco as Dúver Cruz "Manín"
- Juan Manuel Restrepo as Erik "Mateo" Cruz Montoya 'Pez Koi'
- Mariana Gomez as Irma "El Huracán"
- Marcelo Dos Santos as Mike Rivera
- Juan Palau as Drama Key
- Diana Wiswell as Catalina Bedoya
- Pedro Roda as José Serna
- Luna Baxter as Silvia Duarte
- Pedro Ochoa as Búho
- Mariana Garzón as Vanessa Cruz Granados
- Erik Rodríguez as Titano
- Sebastián Silva as Alberto Espitia "Pite"
- Carlos Fernández as Ángel Botero
- Pedro Suárez as Caronte
- Ángel David Giraldo as Emilio
- Kevin Buri as Cris Vega
- Kiño as Axel
- Camila Taborda as Zafiro

== Episodes ==
No. overall	No. in season	Title	Original release date	Colombia viewers (Rating points)
83	1	"El recuerdo de Charly Flow vuelve a atormentar a Yeimy"	26 April 2021	14.9
Yeimy feels like she is being followed and believes it is her worst enemy, Charly, who returns with the intention of hurting her. Losing everything again is a fear that seizes Yeimy.
84	2	"Manín tiene el objetivo de acabar con Yeimy Montoya"	27 April 2021	12.4
Alergia, one of Manín's men, manages to get Manín to tell him how he survived and managed to be free from the authorities. Also, one of his plans is to get Charly out of prison soon so he can begin his revenge plan.
85	3	"Charly sale de la carcel dispuesto a demostrar su cambio"	28 April 2021	13.5
Because of his good behavior and his voluntary work with the younger prisoners, the judge grants Charly probation. Charly is willing to change his life, but someone will cross into his plans.
86	4	"Alergia detona una bomba en el restaurante de Ligia"	29 April 2021	13.9
Following Manín’s orders, Alergia takes advantage of the restaurant being empty and puts a bomb in the kitchen, without counting with the arrival of Erik.
87	5	"Manín visita el restaurante para ver a Ligia"	30 April 2021	12.2
Manín arrives in the neighborhood to see what happened after the explosion and although he leaves without anyone noticing him, Ligia catches sight of him and enters in despair.
88	6	"Catalina quiere recuperar a su hijo"	3 May 2021	11.8
After having a scare while spending time with her son and finding out about Yeimy’s threats, Catalina is willing to take Emilio by her side.
89	7	"Juancho confronta a Yeimy por la canción en la que estuvo trabajando"	4 May 2021	12.0
After confessing that she was after Charly, Juancho cannot avoid asking Yeimy for the song she has hid in secret and makes him think it’s about Erik’s father.
90	8	"Se prepara la inauguración de Grey Shark"	5 May 2021	12.3
The invitations for the inauguration of Grey Shark begin to arrive at Surround Vibes, nobody expects Mike Rivera’s moves and little by little interviews are started. Ligia’s relationship is getting affected by Manín and Charly.
91	9	"Irma recibe la propuesta de unirse a Grey Shark"	6 May 2021	12.7
During the inauguration of Grey Shark, Mike Rivera’s assistant tries to convince Irma of taking one the best decisions for her career. The decisions of Yeimy and Juancho bother Erik’s girlfriend.
92	10	"Yeimy se lanza como cantante"	7 May 2021	11.5
After gaining popularity as a producer and composer, Yeimy decides to fulfill her dream of becoming a singer and announcing it to her fans.
93	11	"Yeimy habla con Olga sobre el lanzamiento de 'Fijación'"	10 May 2021	12.5
Yeimy refuses to produce her new song with Juancho, this is because of all the sensations produced by the song that was born in a dream with Charly.
94	12	"Contreras logra capturar a Dina"	11 May 2021	12.5
In the middle of an operation, Detective Contreras manages to capture the suspect in the attempt kidnapping of Emilio.
95	13	"Manín planea un atentado en contra de Yeimy"	12 May 2021	12.3
Manín does not intend to stay still, he takes advantage of the fact that Yeimy is in jail and gives his men the order to attack her.
96	14	"Charly graba su videoclip musical y dispara su carrera"	13 May 2021	11.3
Thanks to the information given to him by Titano, Charly steals Yeimy’s idea and films his music video which is a success.
97	15	"Yeimy graba su video con una idea sencilla pero poderosa"	14 May 2021	11.6
Juancho confronts Charly for stealing the idea for the music video, but seeing Charly’s cynicism, he and Yeimy decide to focus on a new idea and how to make it go viral.
98	16	"Yeimy y Charly se enfrentan en un duelo musical"	18 May 2021	11.2
Yeimy and Charly face off in a musical duel, both give excellent performances and the scores are very close, so they are asked to sing a duet together so a winner can be declared.
99	17	"Yeimy es protagonista de un supuesto triángulo amoroso"	19 May 2021	11.6
Barbosa, ally journalist of Grey Shark, publishes an article on the alleged attraction between Yeimy and Charly, and their love triangle with Juancho.
100	18	"Manín planea usar a Caronte de carnada para encontrar a Don Edgar"	20 May 2021	10.5
Caronte tells Manín that Don Edgar’s men after him, so Manín comes up with the idea of using Caronte as bait to find Don Edgar soon.
101	19	"Charly recibe una sorpresa por parte de Mike Rivera"	21 May 2021	11.1
To remedy the displeasure that he caused him, Mike gives Charly a luxurious apartment so he can live once again as an artist.
102	20	"Yeimy intenta impresionar a Orlando en su presentación con Grupo Do2"	24 May 2021	10.8
Since Erik went on a retreat, there are contracts for which Juancho and Yeimy have to respond, so she does everything to comply.
103	21	"Manín planea destruir a Surround y atacar a Juancho"	25 May 2021	10.7
Manín orders Caronte to threaten Garrido, accountant of Surround, so that he can get his bosses to sign false paper and mess up the company.
104	22	"Charly besa a Yeimy durante la grabación del comercial"	26 May 2021	11.2
Under pressure from the client, Yeimy accepts a kiss from Charly, but in the end shows her anger. Meanwhile Mike Rivera thinks about profit he will get from the images.
105	23	"Charly habla bien de Yeimy mientras acompaña a Erik en la UCI"	27 May 2021	11.1
Charly approaches his son, who is unconscious and recently out of surgery, takes the opportunity to talk about what he admires about Yeimy and she listens to him while passing by the room.
106	24	"Mike niega su responsabilidad con las imágenes virales de Charly y Yeimy"	28 May 2021	10.0
Charly confronts Mike because he was the only one who knew that Yeimy was in his house. The gossip continues and Yeimy’s relationship is in trouble.
107	25	"Yeimy averigua si Manín está vivo"	31 May 2021	12.4
After waking up, Erik tells Yeimy that he saw Manín in the hospital, immediately, Yeimy starts to investigate the supposed death of the capo.
108	26	"José ve algo sospechoso en el cultivo de flores que le costará la vida"	1 June 2021	12.6
José leaves a message to Contreras asking to talk to him after discovering a weapons shipment in the flower field, a fact that enrages Manín.
109	27	"Yeimy enfrenta a Charly y le dice que ya sabe que Manín está vivo"	2 June 2021	12.7
Yeimy travels to Miami and finds out the DEA’s plan, she confronts Charly and asks him to tell Manín that she will hunt him down.
110	28	"Yeimy pretende encontrar a Don Édgar para producir una guerra entre él y Manín"	4 June 2021	9.0
Yeimy asks Búho and Zulma for help in finding Édgar and starting a war between him and Manín. Yeimy insists this is the way to save her family.
111	29	"Búho logra conseguir una cita entre Don Edgar y Yeimy"	8 June 2021	12.2
With one of his contacts from the column, Búho manages to get Edgar to receive Yeimy's message and take an interest in talking to her.
112	30	"Erik encuentra el cuerpo de José"	9 June 2021	12.6
Erik visits the morgue, he sees the other body and confirms it is José. He is shocked and calls Irma to give her the bad news.
113	31	"Manín sale a la luz"	10 June 2021	11.7
Yeimy asks Charly to tell Manín that she is going to tell that he is alive and as soon as Silvia alerts the Manín, he decides to go out and tell himself by showing himself as a victim.
114	32	"Yeimy declara en contra de Manín ante la prensa"	11 June 2021	11.2
Yeimy declares on television and in front of Botero that Manín tried to kill her and he is linked to the death of José and the disappearance of the detectives.
115	33	"Botero le promete a Ligia investigar a fondo la muerte de José"	15 June 2021	11.1
Botero raids Envigado’s farm looking for clues about José's death and the disappearance of the detectives.
116	34	"Juancho discute fuertemente con Yeimy por la nota de Zulma"	16 June 2021	12.0
Zulma analyzes the lyrics of "Fijación" and concludes that Yeimy composed it with Charly in mind. Juancho, affected by Zulma's note, fights strongly with Yeimy.
117	35	"Mike Rivera trata de llevarse a Sandee a Grey Shark"	17 June 2021	11.7
After his performance at the concert for peace, Juancho decides to hire Sandee and get ahead of Rivera, who during his performance looks restless.
118	36	"Manín pone en marcha el plan para hundir a Juancho"	18 June 2021	10.0
Manín orders his men to go ahead with the plans against Yeimy’s loved ones. Carontes looks for allies to send Juancho to jail.
119	37	"Ligia se ofrece como carnada para atrapar a Manín"	21 June 2021	10.5
After Manín’s unexpected visit to the restaurant, Ligia tells Botero that she is offering herself as bait to make Manín fall, but Botero does not accept as he does not want to put her in danger.
120	38	"Botero enfrenta a Manín tras descubrir su fachada como Albeiro Rosales"	22 June 2021	11.2
Yeimy informs Botero that Manín has been operating under the name Albeiro Rosales and puts him on notice.
121	39	"Drama Key le confiesa a Irma la atracción que siente por ella"	23 June 2021	12.1
Drama Key confesses to Irma that she drives him crazy and they end up sleeping together. The next day, Vanessa arrives at El Huracán’s house and discovers that Drama Key and Irma spent the night together.
122	40	"Titano ejecuta su plan para acabar con Yeimy"	24 June 2021	11.6
Following Manín’s order of killing Yeimy, Titano camouflages the shots in the middle of filming the music video of "Siete vidas".
123	41	"Charly logra impedir que Titano mate a Yeimy"	25 June 2021	11.5
Charly sneaks into the intensive care unit to see Yeimy and runs into Titano, who wants to kill Yeimy, but Charly stops him by telling him that the security cameras could see him.
124	42	"Juancho es detenido tras el falso testimonio de su contador"	28 June 2021	11.4
Garrido declares that Juancho met with Totono and received money from him. Juancho cannot prove the contrary and is taken to jail.
125	43	"La inminente guerra entre Manín y Don Édgar es detenida por Charly"	29 June 2021	11.3
Charly confronts Manín because of Juancho’s situation, without knowing that Don Édgar and his men are coming to kill them. However Charly manages to handle the situation y proposes to unite.
126	44	"Juancho trata de contactar a Totono en la cárcel"	30 June 2021	11.5
Despite the warning from his lawyer and his sister, Juancho wants to prove the nexus of Tontono with Manín and Charly, as he suspects that they are to blame for his misfortune.
127	45	"Drama Key le cuenta a Erik que se acostó con Irma"	1 July 2021	11.0
After running into Drama Key, Erik decides to congratulate him but Drama Key tells him he slept with Irma. Erik confronts Irma and breaks up with her.
128	46	"Yeimy pide ayuda a sus fans para encontrar a Titano"	2 July 2021	9.9
Yeimy puts out a video where she asks her fans for help to find Titano’s whereabouts as he is the prime suspect in the attack against her.
129	47	"Botero interroga a Garrido y logra salvarle la vida"	7 July 2021	10.8
Garrido, the culprit of the false testimony against Juancho, talks to Yeimy and she advises him and makes arranges with Botero so he can declare what he knows.
130	48	"Botero le declara su amor a Ligia, pero ella teme por su vida"	8 July 2021	11.7
After finding out that Charly confessed the truth to Manín, Ligia goes to Botero to unburden herself and he is not afraid to declare his feelings for her and tell her that he is not afraid of Manín.
131	49	"Charly le deja claro a Yeimy que la ama y que no se va a ir de su lado"	9 July 2021	11.2
After confessing his feelings for her in the hospital, Charly and Yeimy kiss and she realizes she also feels something does not want to continue.
132	50	"Botero descubre que Sorzano es el informante de Manín"	12 July 2021	10.7
133	51	"Totono es asesinado en la carcel por orden de Caronte y Titano"	13 July 2021	10.7
134	52	"Manín quiere incriminar Juancho en la muerte de Totono"	14 July 2021	10.1
135	53	"Don Edgar decide investigar Silvia para despejar sus dudas"	15 July 2021	10.5
136	54	"Yeimy confiesa a Juancho y Erik que se acosto con Charly"	16 July 2021	10.5
137	55	"Manín y Silvia le tienden una trampa a Don Edgar"	19 July 2021	11.0
138	56	"Silvia le dice a Charly que quiere dejar la misión"	21 July 2021	10.7
139	57	"Yeimy se enfoca obsesivamente en el trabajo"	22 July 2021	10.7
140	58	"Titano finge ser una mujer extranjera para estar al frente del bar"	23 July 2021	10.2
141	59	"Yeimy le admite a Charly que ya lo perdono"	26 July 2021	10.7
142	60	"Juancho despide a Yeimy de Surround"	27 July 2021	10.1
143	61	"Juancho expone públicamente la relación de Yeimy y Charly"	28 July 2021	10.0
144	62	"Titano secuestra a Clarkson"	29 July 2021	10.4
145	63	"Irma pierde un importante contrato para Grey Shark"	30 July 2021	10.2
146	64	"Yeimy decide alejarse de Charly y terminar su relación"	2 August 2021	10.1
147	65	"Yeimy anuncia ante los medios su firma con Grey Shark"	3 August 2021	10.9
148	66	"Mike mueve sus fichas y acusa de plagio a Surround"	4 August 2021	10.7
149	67	"La DEA aprueba la colaboración de Charly para capturar a Manín"	5 August 2021	10.8
150	68	"Charly falla en el operativo de la DEA para capturar a Manín"	6 August 2021	9.8
151	69	"Manín intenta conquistar a Ligia a pesar de su negativa"	9 August 2021	11.0
152	70	"Titano acepta el intercambio de Yeimy por Ligia"	10 August 2021	11.1
153	71	"Ligia arruina los planes para su rescate por temor"	11 August 2021	11.3
154	72	"Manín le pide a Charly matar a Juancho"	12 August 2021	11.3
155	73	"La caleta de Manín es descubierta"	13 August 2021	9.7
156	74	"Charly y Manín se enfrentan a tiros"	17 August 2021	12.0
157	75	"La foto del supuesto cadáver de Juancho se difunde"	18 August 2021	11.9
158	76	"Caronte llama a Botero para negociar su entrega"	19 August 2021	12.4
159	77	"Titano se cuela en Surround e intenta matar a Yeimy"	20 August 2021	11.7
160	78	"Manín es abatido por Ligia"	23 August 2021	12.5
161	79	"Titano planea fugarse para cumplir con su venganza"	24 August 2021	13.5
162	80	"Titano toma un veneno para su fuga"	25 August 2021	12.0
163	81	"Titano culpa a Charly de su envenenamiento"	26 August 2021	12.1
164	82	"Titano escapa del hospital con ayuda de Meñeco y Samurai"	27 August 2021	10.3
165	83	"Titano planea llegarle a Yeimy por medio de Erik para cumplir su venganza"	30 August 2021	12.5
166	84	"Catalina le confiesa a Juancho sobre el robo de la canción de Sandee"	31 August 2021	11.2
167	85	"Titano tortura a Erik luego de que no cooperara con sus órdenes"	1 September 2021	12.1
168	86	"Revive los mejores momentos de La Reina del Flow 2"	3 September 2021	9.4
169	87	"Titano muere en medio de una misión de rescate"	6 September 2021	12.9
170	88	"Yeimy, Charly y Juancho empiezan a trabajar en un nuevo proyecto musical"	7 September 2021	11.6
171	89	"Juancho y Mike discuten públicamente sobre quién tiene la mejor productora"	8 September 2021	13.1
172	90	"Mike es capturado por la Policía y llevado a prisión"	10 September 2021	13.3
