= Rafael Negrete =

Mexican actor and singer (born 1976)

- Born: Jorge Garcia Negrete; 1 May 1969 (age 55); Mexico City, Mexico
- Website: Official website

Jorge Garcia "Rafael" Negrete, is a Mexican actor and Opera singer, who also performs traditional Mexican music.

Rafa Negrete, as often called, is the grandson of the Mexican legendary icon Jorge Negrete

Negrete is a tenor. but also he has sung various baritone roles.

He has a degree in Opera singing from the National Conservatory of Music. According to family tradition, he is also a Mexican Traditional music singer and songwriter, performing in large, popular venues, such as theaters and Concert Halls. Nacional de Música, in Mexico (Mexican National Conservatory of Music). and also studied at the University for Music and Dramatic Art Mozarteum, in Salzburg, Austria. Furthermore, he studied vocal technique in Mexico with Enrique Jaso and Maria Luisa Tamez, later with tenor Alfredo Portilla and coach James Demster. He has also taken master-class in Italy with soprano Francesca Scaini

Negrete follows the tradition of El Charro Cantor, by disseminating Mexican music throughout the world but he keeps an active schedule of performances of either Traditional Mexican Music or Bel Canto.

He has performed in major venues of many countries with great acceptance, including a great number of concerts on his own, in Mexico. For instance, he has performed in Teatro Bicentenario (Bicentennial Theater in Texcoco); Teatro Aguascalientes; Auditorio Zaragoza; Museo Nacional de las Artes (National Museum of Arts);Sala Ponce, del Palacio de Bellas Artes (Ponce Hall at Palace of Fine Arts); Lunario, Auditorio Nacional (National Auditorium), Alcazar del Castillo de Chapultepec (Imperial Residence Room, in Chapultepec Castle); Centro Nacional de las Artes (National Center for the Arts); Zócalo Capitalino (Mexico City Main Square); Teatro de la Paz ( De la Paz Theater) Auditorio Silvestre Revueltas; Auditorio Juan Rulfo; CECUT (Tijuana's Cultural Center); Hipódromo de las Américas (Mexico's largest racecourse venue); Centro Voilá, Antara among many others. In the United States, Negrete has had presentations throughout the Nation, in different events, such as Mariachi Conferences, Fairs and Festivals, as well as tenor performances. Negrete has performed in various cities of the state of California, including Santa Ana, Long Beach, Los Angeles, and others. In 2004, he was the leading performer of The North Carolina, Charlotte's Latin American Festival. In 2013 he was a special guess/leading performer at the closing concert "Noche de Estrellas" in Tucson, Arizona. Negrete has participated for three consecutive years, 2012, 2013 and 2014, in the "Chicago Mariachi and Tequila Festival". In December 2009, he performed at the traditional, New Year's Eve Concert in Mexico City. He has recently participated in the "International Mariachi Summit 2016 and 2020", in San Diego, along with Mariachi Vargas de Tecalitlán, and Jeff Nevin, soon after in Tijuana, Rafael paid special tribute to his grandfather Jorge Negrete. in 2018 he performed in Fiesta DC, the ultimate celebration of Latino culture and heritage in the Washington Metropolitan Area. Also performed in Austria, Germany ( he as performance was in 2019)France, Japan, Spain ( his last performance there were 2019 and 2023Nicaragua, El Salvador and Peru.

Negrete has also performed in major operas, like Turandot, Tosca, Carmen, Pagliacci, Nabucco, Madame Butterfly, in Mexican cities such as Tabasco, Durango, Zacatecas, Coahuila, Toluca and Mexico City. In 2015 he participated in The "Ceibe" Festival, in Villahermosa, Tabasco, and did a great starring role, in the Opera, The Pagliacci, of Ruggero Leoncavallo. In November 2015, Negrete did consecutive representations of the Opera Tosca of Giacomo Puccini, in Saltillo, Coahuila, Mexico, and received great reviews, in his role of "Mario Cavaradossi". In 2016, he played Ismaelle, in the Opera Nabucco, of Giuseppe Verdi, performing with the Toluca Philharmonic Orchestra, which was also a big success. Negrete is also very versatile when it comes to acting. Therefore, he has participated in movies, musical plays, commercials, and television series: 1996 He was Azaël in L'Enfant prodigue by C.A. Debussy., at the Sala Revueltas and Ponce Hall at Belles Artes. In 1994, he was Camille de Rossillon, in the play Merry Widow by F.Léhar, directed by famous Enrique Alonso, at "Teatro Lírico", Mexico In 1995, Negrete played "Matt", in The Fantastics by Harvey Schmidt at the Jiménez Rueda Theater, in Mexico. In 1998, in a Mexican video home, "La que se fue"(The one that walked away), directed by Juan Luis Orendáin, Negrete had the starring role of Francisco. In this movie, his antagonist was a world know Mexican actor, Ernesto Gómez Cruz. In 1999, played the role of Bellgallo, in the Austrian Operetta of Franz Von Suppé, "Zehn Madchen und Kein Mann", (Ten Girls Without a Husband), directed by R. Pflanz, in Salzburg, Austria. In 2004, he characterized Vato, in a famous musical play "Suave Patria", directed by Miguel Sabido, in Teatro Tepeyac" Mexico. In 2006, he personated Fray Mendoza, in the movie Martín de Porres, directed by R. Calixto, in Mexico and Venezuela. From 2006 to 2009, incarnated General Guadalupe Victoria, in the Mexican TV series "Secretos de Nuestra Historia" (Secrets of our History) In 2007, Negrete participated in the movie Padre Pro, of Miguel Rico Tavera. In 2012–2013, Negrete acted as mariachi singer, Genaro, "El Barítono de Hidalgo" in a Televisa Soap-opera Qué Bonito Amor (What a Beautiful Love), produced by Salvador Mejía and directed by Alberto Díaz. In 2015, Negrete had a small role as a Mariachi singer, in the comedy movie "Una Última y nos Vamos" directed by Noé Santillán López.
