= Mark Tacher =

Mexican actor (born 1977)

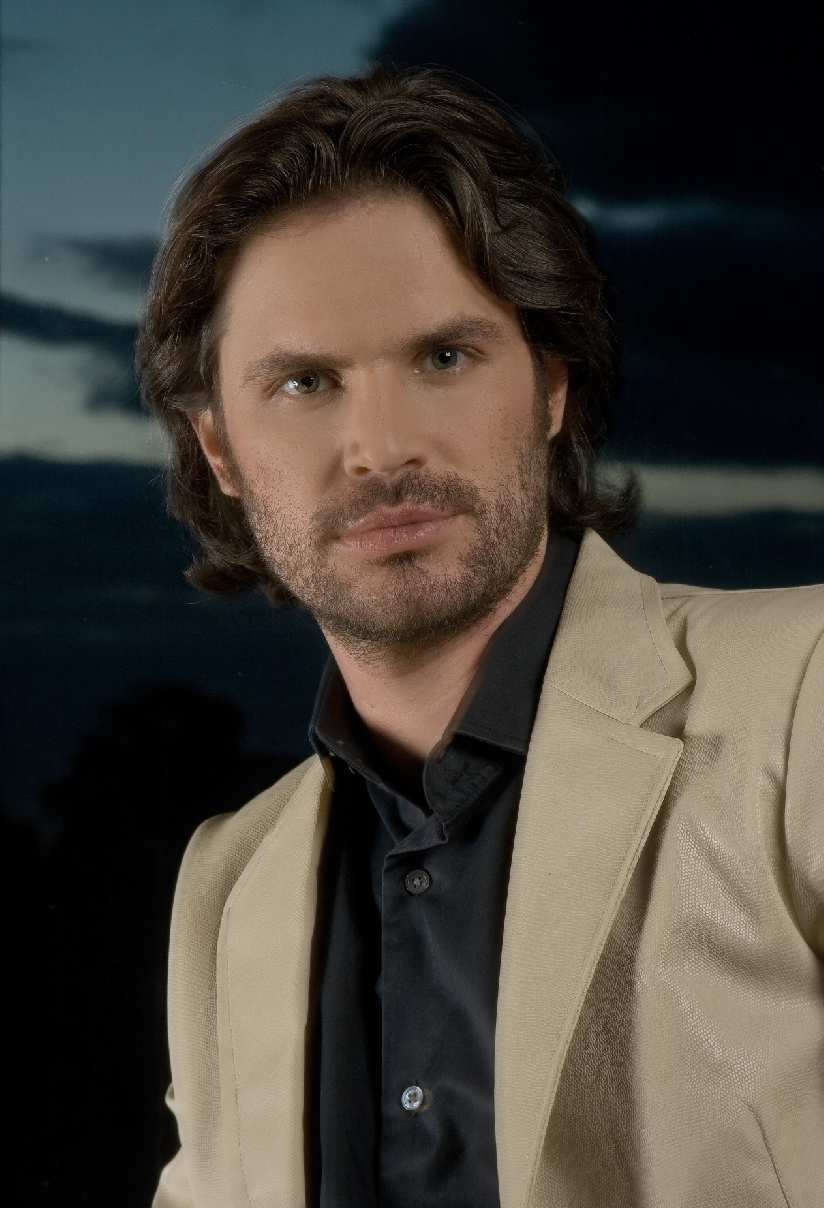
- Tacher in 2015
- Born: Mark Tacher Feingold; 17 September 1977 (age 48); Mexico City, Mexico
- Occupation: Actor
- Years active: 1996–present
- Partner: Cecilia Galliano (2011–2014)
- Relatives: Alan Tacher (brother)
- Website: http://www.marktacher.com/

Mark Tacher Feingold (born 17 September 1977) is a Mexican actor, musician, vocalist, guitarist, and a television host. He began as a television host in 1996, and has starred in a reality show, TV series, and telenovelas including La hija del mariachi, Verano de amor, Alma de Hierro, Para Volver a Amar, Mujeres Asesinas, Triunfo del Amor, La Voz... México, Abismo de pasión, Qué pobres tan ricos, and Que te perdone Dios.

== Biography ==
Mark Tacher was born in Mexico City, Mexico, D.F. Mark holds a degree in acting, has a background in music and singing, speaks three languages (Spanish, English and Hebrew), and has also modeled several brands of clothing and footwear.

He holds a degree in performance studies, obtained at Azteca CEFAT (El Centro de Formación de Actores para la Televisión) in Mexico (1997–1999). He studied music, guitar, singing, and DJ at Academia G. Martell in Mexico. From 2005 to 2006, Mark studied acting at Tecnicas de Perfeccionamiento Actoral, La Verdad sin Esfuerzo with the help from Prof. Nelson Ortega in Venezuela.

Mark made his television appearance as the host in Nintendomanía (1996–1998), then later appeared in Vision Real (1998), Atrévete (1999) and Ciclón Azteca (2003). He's also acted in theatrical plays, television series, Mexican telenovelas, and has hosted several television programs.

As well as acting in Mexican telenovelas, Mark also starred in telenovelas in Venezuela and Colombia. He received two awards, including best actor, in Venezuela for his role in Mujer con pantalones (2005). Mark is still known for his acting in the Colombian telenovela La hija del mariachi (2006), a successful telenovela in Colombia and acclaimed internationally.

== Filmography ==
Television roles
Year	Title	Roles	Notes
1996	Nintendomanía	Marco	Television host
1998	Tres veces Sofía	Juan Carlos Cifuentes	
1999	Háblame de amor	Leo	
2000	Tío Alberto	Eduardo	Series regular; 129 episodes
2001–2002	Lo que es el amor	Tadeo Márquez	Series regular; 68 episodes
2002	Súbete a mi moto	José	Series regular; 148 episodes
2005–2006	Mujer con pantalones	Salvador Diego Vega Andonegui	Main role; 221 episodes
2006–2007	La hija del mariachi	Emiliano Sánchez-Gallardo Galván / Francisco Lara	Main role; 147 episodes
2008	Los protegidos	Santiago Puerta	Main role; 110 episodes
2009	Verano de amor	Dante Escudero	Main role; 120 episodes
2009	Alma de hierro	Gael	3 episodes
2010	Mujeres asesinas	Vicente	Episode: "Las Blanco, viudas"
2010–2011	Para volver a amar	Jorge Casso	Main role; 146 episodes
2011	Triunfo del amor	Alonso Del Angel	Series regular; 59 episodes
2011	La Voz México	Host	Main role; 18 episodes
2012	Abismo de pasión	Gael	Main role; 144 episodes
2013–2014	Qué pobres tan ricos	Alejo Ruizpalacios Saravia	Main role; 167 episodes
2015	Que te perdone Dios	Mateo	Main role; 118 episodes
2015	Antes muerta que Lichita	Luis Altamirano	1 episode
2016	Mujeres de negro	Nicolás	Episodes: "Vestidas de negro" and "Viejos conocidos"
2017	El Bienamado	León Serrano	Main role; 88 episodes
2017–2018	Papá a toda madre	Fabián Carvajal	Main role; 96 episodes
2019	La Reina del Sur	Alejandro Alcalá	Main role (season 2); 52 episodes
2020	Operación pacífico	Gabriel Pedraza	Main role
2021	The War Next-door	Ernesto	Main role
2021	Malverde: El Santo Patrón	Vicente del Río	Lead role
2022–2023	Amores que engañan	Ernesto Reynaldo	Episode: "Sobreviviente" Episode: "El preferido de mamá"
2022–2023	Mi camino es amarte	Fausto Beltrán Rubalcaba	Lead role
2023	El maleficio	Álvaro	
2024	Top Chef VIP	Himself	Contestant (season 3)
2025	Los hilos del pasado	Leonardo	Main cast

== Theater ==
Year	Title	Role	Place
1999	El Cascanueces		
2000	Trimusic, El Genio de la Música		Teatro Ramiro Jiménez
2004	Las Princesas y sus Príncipes		Centro Cultural San Ángel
2005	Jav y Jos	Jav	Teatro Nacional, Colombia
2007	Mesopotamia	Mateo	Teatro Trasnocho
2013	Departamento de Solteros	Mateo	Dream Theater Producciones
2013	Manos Quietas	Manuel	

== Awards ==
- Las Palmas de Oro – Círculo Nacional de Periodistas CINPE (National Circle of Journalists), Best Actor 2002.
- Mara de Oro (Mujer con pantalones / Venezuela, Best Actor 2005)
- Lo Mejor de Venezuela / Venezuela, 2005.
