= Pobres Rico =

- Genre: Comedy
- Created by: Adriana Lorenzon; Juan Manuel Cáceres; Liliana Guzmán; Guillermo Restrepo; Héctor Alejandro Moncada; Juan Carlos Troncoso
- Directed by: Pepe Sánchez
- Starring: Paola Rey; Juan Pablo Raba; Antonio Sanint; Alina Lozano; Alejandra Azcárate; Constanza Duque; Carlos Torres; María Helena Doering
- Opening theme: Pobres Rico by Diego Páez
- Country of origin: Colombia
- Original language: Spanish
- No. of episodes: 167

Production
- Production location: Bogotá
- Production companies: RCN Televisión; Resonant TV

Original release
- Network: RCN Televisión
- Release: 7 May 2012 – 24 January 2013

Related
- La Traicionera; Amo de casa; Qué pobres tan ricos

Pobres Rico is a 2012 Colombian telenovela produced by RCN Televisión and Resonant TV and aired by RCN Televisión.

== Cast ==
=== Los Rico ===
- Gonzalo Rico (Juan Pablo Raba)
- Gustavo Rico (Carlos Torres)
- Gabriela Rico (Maria Dalmazzo)
- Ester Blanco Viuda de Rico (Constanza Duque)

=== Los Siachoques ===
- Mariela Siachoque (Paola Rey)
- Carlos Siachoque (Diego Vásquez)
- Jhon Alexis Siachoque (Camilo Trujillo)
- Yusmary Siachoque (Vanesa Tamayo)
- Nicolás Rico Siachoque (Santiago Prieto)

== Versions ==
- (Mexico) Qué pobres tan ricos - a 2013 Mexican telenovela produced by Rosy Ocampo, starring Zuria Vega and Jaime Camil.
- (United States) Broke - a 2020 American loosely-based comedy series, Starring Jaime Camil, Pauley Perrette, Natasha Leggero, Izzy Diaz, and Antonio Raul Corbo.
