= Wandering Girl =

- Directed by: Rubén Mendoza
- Written by: Rubén Mendoza
- Produced by: Daniel García
- Starring: Sofía Paz Jara; Carolina Ramírez; Lina Marcela Sánchez; María Camila Mejía
- Cinematography: Sofía Oggioni, Rubén Mendoza
- Edited by: Andrea Chignoli, Rubén Mendoza
- Music by: Las Ánez
- Release date: November 25, 2018 (Tallinn Black Nights Film Festival)
- Running time: 82 minutes
- Country: Colombia
- Language: Spanish

Wandering Girl (original title: Niña Errante) is a 2018 Colombian film directed by Rubén Mendoza. Mendoza's fourth feature, the coming-of-age road movie made its world premiere as part of the Official Selection and won Grand Prix for Best Film and Best Music at the 2018 Tallinn Black Nights Film Festival.

== Plot ==
Teenage Angela (Sofía Paz Jara) meets her three adult half-sisters (Carolina Ramírez, Lina Marcela Sánchez, María Camila Mejia) for the first time when their father dies. Fearing that Angela will end up in state care, they embark on a 900 miles journey across Colombia to leave Angela with an aunt she has never even met. Critics have stated that this movie explores and has insights into topics such as "family" and "nature vs. nurture."

== Cast ==
- Sofía Paz Jara as Ángela
- Carolina Ramírez as Carolina
- Lina Marcela Sánchez as Paula
- María Camila Mejía as Gabriela

== Awards and nominations ==
Year	Award	Category	Recipient	Result
2018	Tallinn Black Nights Film Festival	Grand Prix for Best Film	Wandering Girl	Won
2018	Tallinn Black Nights Film Festival	Best Music	Las Ánez	Won
