= The Queen of Flow =

Colombian telenovela

- Spanish: La Reina del Flow
- Genre: Telenovela
- Created by: Claudia Sánchez; Said Chamie
- Developed by: Andrés Salgado Tous
- Directed by: Rodrigo Lalinde; Liliana Bocanegra; Klych López; Andrés López; Carlos Mario Urrea; Harold Ariza
- Creative director: Juan Fernando Pérez
- Starring: Carolina Ramírez; Carlos Torres; Andrés Sandoval
- Opening theme: "Ser un cantante" by Manuel Turizo
- Composers: José Fernández; David Arias Botero; Nicolás Uribe; Sebastián Luengas; Marcos Carreño "Kiño"
- Country of origin: Colombia
- Original language: Spanish
- No. of seasons: 3
- No. of episodes: 237 (list of episodes)

Production
- Executive producers: Angélica Guerra; Luis Eduardo Jiménez Padilla; Juan Pablo Posada; Ana Bond; Andrés Biermann
- Producers: July Sierra; Amanda Neme
- Production locations: Medellin, Colombia; New York, United States
- Cinematography: Juan Carlos Martínez; Andrés Perdigón; Diego Jiménez
- Editor: Gerson Aguilar
- Camera setup: Multi-camera
- Production companies: Sony Pictures Television; Teleset; Caracol Televisión

Original release
- Network: Caracol
- Release: 12 June 2018 – 21 April 2026

Related
- La reina soy yo

The Queen of Flow (Spanish: La Reina del Flow) is a Colombian telenovela produced by Sony Pictures Television and Teleset for Caracol Televisión. It is a musical telenovela based on the genre of reggaeton. The series stars Carolina Ramírez, Carlos Torres, and Andrés Sandoval.

On 9 October 2018, Caracol Televisión confirmed that the show has been renewed for a second season. The second season premiered on 26 April 2021. On 17 September 2024, the series was renewed for a third season that premiered on 13 January 2026.

== Plot ==
Season	Episodes	Originally released	
Season	Episodes	First released	Last released
1	82	12 June 2018	9 October 2018
2	90	26 April 2021	10 September 2021
3	65	13 January 2026	21 April 2026

=== Season 1 (2018) ===
Yeimy Montoya is a 17-year-old girl with a gift for writing catchy reggaeton rhymes and musical rhythms. Yeimy is in love with Charly Cruz, her classmate and neighbor. She has written many songs about Charly in her secret notebook, which she guards as if it were her child. Yeimy meets one of Charly's friends, Juan Camilo, 'Juancho', who convinces her to join their reggaeton group, Soul & Bass. A love triangle soon forms as Juancho begins to fall for Yeimy. She is oblivious about his feelings for her as she starts to become friendlier and closer with Charly. Although Charly slowly becomes attracted to her, he is simultaneously jealous of her ability to easily compose rhythmic flows, a talent he sorely lacks.

Charly's uncle, Manín, is a local and powerful narco-trafficker who murders Yeimy's parents in their bakery after refusing to pay protection bribes to him. The police are bribed and ordered by Manín to quash the investigation into the Montoya's murder. Soon after, Soul & Bass begin to get attention from a local radio station and secure a meeting with music producers in New York City. Manín orders Charly and his men to rob a health clinic. Yeimy, coincidentally there with her grandmother, recognizes Charly during the heist despite his ski mask due to his Soul & Bass tattoo. Yeimy confronts Charly about the robbery and he confesses it was for Soul & Bass's NYC trip, promising not to repeat it and seduces Yeimy so that she doesn't turn him in.

Charly tells Manín that Yeimy knows about the robbery and strikes a deal to spare her. The night before their flight to New York, Charly goes to Yeimy's house to give her a suitcase filled with cocaine so that she will be arrested for being a drug mule, and continues to seduce her and they have sex. As Yeimy sleeps, Charly steals her song notebook. At US customs, Yeimy is arrested for the cocaine and upon arriving to prison she is physically assaulted by a guard, who tells her that if she mentions Manín or Charly, her grandmother will be killed. Yeimy realizes that Charly set her up and is devastated by his betrayal. Juancho wants to help Yeimy, but Charly accuses her of being a drug mule, leading to their friendship and music group ending. Charly impresses NYC executives with Yeimy's song, 'Reflejo', taking credit for the song and securing an opportunity for a music career in Puerto Rico. Juancho starts a musical equipment business in Colombia.

Seventeen years later, Yeimy is released from prison after reaching an agreement with the authorities. She changes her identity to Tammy Andrade and becomes a successful music producer who searches for new talent in the music industry. With the support of new allies, she pursues her plan for revenge against the person who betrayed her, while facing unexpected challenges along the way.

=== Season 2 (2021) ===
The second season follows 4 years after the events of the first season. Yeimy Montoya (Carolina Ramírez), who after achieving fame and success in music, is living with Juancho and his son from a previous relationship whom Yeimy has adopted as her own. Pez Koi, Charly and Yeimy's son is a worldwide popular singer just like his father. Meanwhile, Carlos Cruz/Charly Flow (Carlos Torres) is now a changed man and makes merits to get out of prison and restart his life once again.

== Cast ==
=== Main ===
Main cast of The Queen of Flow
Actor	Character	Seasons		
Actor	Character	1	2	3
Carolina Ramírez	Yeimy Montoya De Cruz (Note: Ramírez also played Tammy Andrade on the first season.)	Main	Main	Main
Carlos Torres	Carlos "Charly Flow" Cruz Martínez	Main	Main	Main
Andrés Sandoval	Juan Camilo "Juancho" Mesa	Main	Main	
Juan Manuel Restrepo	Erik Mateo "Pez Koi" Cruz Montoya (Note: Restrepo also played young Carlos "Charly" Cruz on the first season.)	Main	Main	Main
Adriana Arango	Ligia de Cruz	Main	Main	Main
Mabel Moreno	Gema Granados de Cruz	Main		
Lucho Velasco	Dúver "Manín" Cruz	Main	Main	
Pacho Rueda	Lucio Albarracín	Main		
Diana Wiswell	Catalina Bedoya	Main	Main	
Mariana Garzón	Vanessa Cruz Granados	Main	Main	Guest
Marcos "Kiño" Carreño	Wendel "AXL" Monsalve	Main	Main	Main
Sebastián Silva	Pedro Alberto "Pite" Espitia	Main	Main	
Mariana Gómez	Irma "El Huracán" Serna	Main	Main	Main
María José Vargas	Yeimy Montoya (young)	Main		
Guillermo Blanco	Juan Camilo "Juancho" Mesa (young)	Main		
Marcelo Dos Santos	Mike Rivera		Main	Main
Juan Palau	Joaquín "Drama Key" Pulido		Main	Main
Luna Baxter	Silvia Duarte / Agent Alicia Nuñez		Main	
Pedro Roda	José Serna	Recurring	Main	
Pedro Pablo Ochoa	El Búho	Recurring	Main	Main
Erik Rodríguez	Variel "Titano" Mostacilla		Main	
Pedro Suárez	Jhonnier "Caronte" Canchila		Main	
Ángel David Giraldo	Emilio Mesa Bedoya		Main	
Kevin Buri	Cristian "Cris" Vega	Recurring	Main	
Camila Taborda	Zafiro		Main	
Allison Joan	Yara "Sky" Giraldo Piedrahíta			Main
Carlos Fernández	Ángel Botero		Recurring	Main
Juana Arboleda	Brenda Piedrahíta			Main
Michell Orozco	Soraya Giraldo			Main
Rami Herrera	Genoveva Vallejo			Main
Manolo Alzamora	Jerónimo Vallejo			Main
Santiago "Rapza" Cano	Luispier Riquelmi		Recurring	Main

=== Recurring ===
Recurring cast of The Queen of Flow
Actor	Character	Seasons		
Actor	Character	1	2	3
Valentina Lizcano	Zulma López	Recurring	Recurring	
Juliana Moreno	Lina Mesa	Recurring	Recurring	
Humberto Rivera	Detective Ricardo Contreras	Recurring	Recurring	
Valeria Bertagnini	Gloria Bedoya	Recurring	Recurring	
Fernando Lara	Darío "Don Edgar" Celis	Recurring	Recurring	
Martha Ginneth Rincón	Estela Espitía	Recurring	Recurring	
Carmenza Cossio	Carmenza de Montoya	Recurring	Guest	
Adrián Jiménez	Hernán "Carrancho" Prieto	Recurring		
David Ojalvo	Agent Ben Rizzo	Recurring		
Alejandro Otero	Jack del Castillo	Recurring		
Miroslava Morales	Lyl "La Taína" Fanny	Recurring		
Camilo Sáenz	Alberto Triana	Recurring		
María Camila Giraldo	Silvana Jaramillo	Recurring		
Eduardo López	Rodrigo "Ruko" Fajardo	Recurring		
Lina Cardona	Carolina Pizarro	Recurring		
Fernando de la Pava	Miguel Barbosa	Recurring		
Vannesa Di Quatro	Rosalía Armenta	Recurring		
Yesenia Valencia	Olga Naranjo		Recurring	Recurring
Juanita Molina	Laura "Sandee" Cadena		Recurring	
Anderson Ballesteros	Alergia		Recurring	
Angela Cano	Denisse Carlina "Dina" Vásquez		Recurring	
Mauricio Mejía	Director Julio Corso		Recurring	
Tatu Jokila	Agent Alvin Clarkson		Recurring	
Fredy Yate	Luis Ricardo Sorzano		Recurring	
María Gaviria	Yesica "La Gata" Quetama		Recurring	
Luna Victoria Castaño Duque	Alma Cruz Montoya			Recurring
Biassini Segura	Marino Marinilla			Recurring

=== Guest stars ===
- Sebastián Yatra as himself
- Manuel Turizo as himself
- Karol G as herself
- Joey Montana as himself
- Rauw Alejandro as himself
- Feid as himself

== Production ==
Principal photography began on 26 August 2017.

== Reception ==
The premiere of the telenovela occupied position No. 1, being the most watched program in Colombia at a national level. Its premiere averages a total of 15.4 points, surpassing the most watched programs of Caracol Televisión as Sin senos sí hay paraíso, and Desafío súper humanos.

After the first episode several viewers drew conclusions that the series would be based on the life of the singer Maluma, due to the appearance, tattoos and dress of the character Charly Flow played by Carlos Torres. Torres says that Maluma was a reference for the creation of this character, as well as Sebastián Yatra, J Balvin, Piso 21 and Reykon, among others.

The telenovela joined the Top 10 of Most Successful Programs since private television started in Colombia in 1998. This telenovela gathered several times more than 20 points of audience (considering 16 points as a TV 'boom'), these ratings had not unseen and unscored since 2012.

=== Ratings ===
Season	Timeslot (COT)	Episodes	First aired		Last aired		Avg. viewers (in points)
Season	Timeslot (COT)	Episodes	Date	Viewers (in points)	Date	Viewers (in points)	Avg. viewers (in points)
1	Mon–Fri 9:00 p.m.	82	12 June 2018	15.4	9 October 2018	21.7	16.70
2	Mon–Fri 9:00 p.m.	90	26 April 2021	14.9	10 September 2021	13.3	11.42
3	Mon–Fri 9:30 p.m.	65	13 January 2026	7.4	21 April 2026	5.8	5.7

=== Awards and nominations ===
Year	Award	Category	Recipient	Result	Ref.
2019	Seoul Drama Awards	Best Drama Series	The Queen of Flow	Nominated	
2019	Seoul Drama Awards	Best Director	Rodrigo Lalinde & Liliana Bocanegra	Nominated	
2019	Seoul Drama Awards	Best Actress	Carolina Ramírez	Nominated	
2019	International Emmy Award	Best Telenovela	The Queen of Flow	Won	

== Adaptations ==
After the success in Colombia, Televisa made an adaptation of the telenovela with the title of La reina soy yo.
