= Francisco el Matemático: Clase 2017 =

Colombian telenovela

- Genre: Telenovela
- Written by: Fernán Rivera; Juan Carlos Troncoso; Jorge Élkim Ospina
- Directed by: Herney Luna; Consuelo González
- Creative director: Gonzalo Martínez
- Starring: Carlos Torres
- Opening theme: "Francisco el matemático" by Mike Bahía and Tomás Luna
- Country of origin: Colombia
- Original language: Spanish
- No. of seasons: 1
- No. of episodes: 73

Production
- Executive producer: Jorge Giraldo
- Production location: Bogotá
- Camera setup: Multi-camera

Original release
- Network: RCN Televisión
- Release: 13 February – 2 June 2017

Related
- Francisco el Matemático

Francisco el Matemático: Clase 2017, is a Colombian television series that premiered on 13 February 2017 on RCN Televisión, and concluded on 2 June 2017. It is a sequel to the series of the same name that aired from 1999 to 2004. It stars Carlos Torres as the titular character.

The series focuses on topics such as first love, sexual orientation, parties with friends, rebellion, tattoos, alcoholism, anorexia, addiction to social networks, physical changes, and bullying.

== Premise ==
The series tells the story of a teacher and his students from the district school "Jimmy Carter", following the same style of the previous series Francisco el matemático. This new season will bring new themes, new stories and will also focus on the current problems of young people such as social networks, drugs, homosexuality, among others.

== Cast ==
- Carlos Torres as Francisco Quintana / Francisco el matemático
- Juan David Galindo as Arturo Sanabria / Coordinador Arturo Sanabria
- Danielle Arciniegas as Mónica / La Barby's
- Victoria Ortiz as Rubí Moreno
- Katherine Escobar as Mariana Rivera
- Margarita Reyes as Gloria García
- Marcela Bustamante as Ingrid
- Edinson Gil as Fabián Castro
- Dylan Fuentes as Cristian Alfonso
- María José Vargas as Juliana Largo
- Laura Villa Pico as Luna García
- Ana María Aguilera as Johana Escobar
- Mauricio Figueroa as Ezequiel Cuervo
- Jorge Monterrosa as Fernando (Fercho)
- Guillermo Blanco as Sebastián Samper
- Kevin Bury as Brayan Esteban Largo
- Juan Felipe Arcila as Daniel Octavio Trujillo
- Cristian David Duque as Giovanni Castro (Gigio)
- Alejandra Crispin as Lesly
- Andrés Rojas as Juan Camilo Daza (JuanK)
- Juan Pablo Posada as Carlos Patiño (Chuly)
- Marianela Quintero as Cristina García
- Ana María Pérez as Melissa Sánchez
- María Irene Toro as Amparito
- Cristian Gómez as Luis

=== Guest ===
- Mario Ruiz as himself
- Mike Bahía as himself
- David Escobar as himself
- Luisa Fernanda W as herself
