= La hija del mariachi (2006 TV series) =

Colombian telenovela

- Genre: Telenovela
- Written by: Mónica Aguledo
- Starring: Mark Tacher; Carolina Ramírez
- Country of origin: Colombia
- Original language: Spanish

Production
- Running time: 45 minutes
- Production company: RCN TV

Original release
- Release: 2006

Related
- Qué bonito amor

La hija del mariachi (English: "the daughter of the mariachi") is a Colombian telenovela produced by RCN TV and written by Mónica Aguledo. It debuted in 2006.

== Synopsis ==
One night, ranchera singer Rosario Guerrero sees Emiliano Sánchez-Gallardo at the doors of Plaza Garibaldi, a mariachi bar. He has an air of vulnerability and signs of having been robbed, so she decides to help him. What she does not know is that he is a wealthy young Mexican who has reached Bogotá, fleeing from justice for a crime he did not commit.

The friendship they develop completely transforms their lives. He is astounded by Rosario's selfless support, a rare commodity in the world of wealth he comes from. Thanks to her, he manages to survive as a mariachi singer in the bar where she sings while eluding the zealous pursuit of Interpol and the police in Colombia and Mexico. In this world, he discovers the widespread influence of mariachi music in Colombia. Above all, in Rosario he finds the great love of his life.

She also finds love thanks to Emiliano. With him, she begins to fit together the scattered pieces of her life. The happiest and yet most painful parts of Rosario's life are related to the memory of her father. He was a mariachi singer, bohemian and passionate, and an affectionate man. Yet he filled his family's life with sadness, because he spent his nights with work, liquor, and women. In a desperate attempt to erase the memory of a turbulent childhood, Rosario is struggling to earn a degree in business management.

Emiliano, a member of one of the most powerful families in Mexico, never imagined he would end up as a singer in a Mexican music bar, living a middle-class life in the Colombian capital. He believed that his legal status in Mexico would be cleared in a few weeks, so he never told Rosario the truth. He is in serious trouble, however, accused of orchestrating a massive money laundering operation actually operated by his friends and partners without his knowledge.

== Cast and characters ==
- Mark Tacher as Emiliano Sánchez-Gallardo
- Carolina Ramírez as Rosario Guerrero
- Nicolás Montero as Javier Macías; he is obsessively in love with Rosario
- Gregorio Pernía as Manuel Rodríguez; has feelings for Rosario
- Estefanía Borges as Virginia Malagón; wants Francisco and wants to steal him from Rosario, whom she hates
- Laura Torres as Lucía Guerrero; Rosario's sister
- Mauro Urquijo as Pedro Guerrero; Rosario's father

== Remake ==
- In 2012, Televisa produced Qué bonito amor, a Mexican remake of La hija del mariachi. It stars Jorge Salinas and Danna García in the roles of Emiliano and Rosario, respectively.
