= Qué bonito amor =

Mexican telenovela

- Genre: Telenovela
- Created by: Ricardo Fiallega
- Story by: Mónica Agudelo; Mauricio Miranda; Felipe Agudelo
- Directed by: Alberto Díaz; Javier Yerandi
- Starring: Jorge Salinas; Danna García; Pablo Montero; Juan Ferrara; Angélica María; Roberto Palazuelos; Víctor Noriega; Malillany Marín; Karla Álvarez; Arturo Peniche
- Theme music composer: José Alfredo Jiménez
- Opening theme: "Qué bonito amor" performed by Vicente Fernández
- Country of origin: Mexico
- Original language: Spanish
- No. of episodes: 161

Production
- Executive producer: Salvador Mejía
- Producers: Aarón Gutiérrez; Bosco Primo de Rivera
- Cinematography: Adrián Frutos; Vivian Sánchez Ross
- Editors: Alfredo Frutos; Marco Antonio Rocha

Original release
- Network: Canal de las Estrellas
- Release: 22 October 2012 – 2 June 2013

Related
- Amor Bravío; Mentir para vivir; La hija del mariachi

Qué bonito amor (international title: Beautiful Love; lit. 'What a Beautiful Love') is a Mexican telenovela produced by Salvador Mejía Alexandre for Televisa, which aired on Las Estrellas from 22 October 2012 to 2 June 2013. It is based on La hija del mariachi, produced by Colombian network RCN Television and written by Mónica Agudelo in 2006–2007. Production of Qué bonito amor officially started on 9 August 2012. In the United States the telenovela aired on Univision from 15 April 2013 to 4 October 2013.

Jorge Salinas, Danna García, and Pablo Montero star as the protagonists, while Malillany Marin, Roberto Palazuelos, Marcelo Buquet, and Salvador Pineda star as the antagonists.

== Plot ==
It is a love story which encompasses Mexican traditions and ennobles one of the most representative icons from its culture: mariachi music. The story begins with meeting the character of Santos Martinez de la Garza, a young, handsome, and carefree millionaire, who owns a car distributor company. Santos is deceived by his closest partners; one of them is Bruno, his friend and his sister's boyfriend, and Wendy. After being accused of fraud and money laundering, Santos is compelled to escape from Los Angeles to Mexico, like a fugitive.

This situation forces him to get a new personality: Jorge Alfredo Vargas, Mariachi. At the same time, the character Maria Mendoza is introduced; a humble, pretty and brave young woman who lives with her mother, Amalia, a widow, and her two younger sisters, Paloma, who is about to turn 15, and Isabel, 8 years old. After her father, Pedro, died, Maria started to work in order to support her family, because Amalia had a degenerative disease, so Maria was the only one able to work.

Santos and Maria meet at the "Ay Jalisco, no te rajes bar", where Maria worked as a singer of ranchero music: it is there they both find love for the first time. The "Ay Jalisco, no te rajes" bar, run by the characters Don Concho and his wife Lourdes, is also the setting where the main emotional, comedic, and dramatic situations in the film take place. Maria's friends who are members of the bar's mariachi band also make an appearance: "The Giant", Fernando; "The Casanova", who will turn into Santos´ confident and ally; "The Dreamer"; "Susanito"; "The Baritone"; "The Adventurer"; and "The Sparrow Hawk".

There are many tunes, chords, and conflicting forces within Santos and Maria's love story. Santos faces Ruben del Olmo, a powerful and cheating businessman who is married but obsessed with Maria's love; and "The Giant", Maria's eternal pretender, who fights for her against Santos, until the rivalry between them becomes a friendship. On the other hand, Maria deals with Elvira's lies and tricks, Don Concho's daughter, who by whim and at any cost will not rest until she can have Santos.

The saddest of the songs: Santos´ identity uncovered, the jail and the separation from his one and only love, Maria. The film is full of ranchero music, mariachis, tequila, color, and the hopes and dreams of the characters.

== Cast ==
=== Main characters ===
- Jorge Salinas as Santos Martínez de la Garza Treviño / Jorge Alfredo Vargas
- Danna García as María Mendoza García de Martínez de la Garza
- Pablo Montero as Óscar Fernández "El Coloso"
- Juan Ferrara as Justo Martínez de la Garza
- Angélica María as Amalia García de Mendoza
- Roberto Palazuelos as Giuliano Rina
- Víctor Noriega as Michael Johnson
- Malillany Marín as Elvira Hernández
- Karla Álvarez as Irasema
- Arturo Peniche as Fernando Beltrán "El Mil Amores"

=== Secondary characters ===
- Salvador Pineda as Don Concepción "Concho" Hernández
- Roberto Ballesteros as Comandante Leonardo "Leo" Derecho
- Rosita Pelayo as Teniente Samantha Curtis
- Fernando Robles as Comandante Malo
- Moisés Suarez as Escudriño #1
- Ricardo Mansur as Escudriño #2
- Mónica Sánchez Navarro as Altagracia Treviño de Martínez de la Garza
- Paty Diaz as Mirna Reynoso
- Miguel Ángel Biaggio as Susano "Susanito" Sánchez
- Mariana Ríos as Ana López
- Susana Diazayas as Wendy Martínez de la Garza Treviño
- Ivonne Ley as Leticia Letty
- Víctor Reséndez "Latin Lover" as Jairo "El Aventurero"
- Mariano Palacios as Natalio Molina "El Soñador"
- Rafael Negrete as Genaro "El Barítono"
- Alejandro Ruiz as "El Siete Mares"
- Gabriel Navarro as "El Búfalo"
- Thelma Dorantes as Mancia Sanchez
- Renata Notni as Paloma Mendoza García
- Jesus Daniel González as Rodrigo Fernández Reyes
- Dayaceli Cervantes as Vanessa
- Karyme Hernàndez as Isabel Mendoza García
- Luis Enrique González as Vicente "El Jalisquito"
- Homero Ferruzca as Homero
- Carlos Ignacio as Leonel "Pichi" Velásquez
- Ninón Sevilla† as Doña Remedios
- Raul Padilla "Choforo"† as Rigoberto Guerra
- Evita Muñoz "Chachita"† as Doña Prudencia
- Raul Izaguirre as Don Braulio
- Pietro Vannucci as Fabian

==== Recurring characters ====
- Manuel Ojeda as Vittoriano Trusco "El Padrino"
- Rogelio Guerra as Carl Summers

==== Guest Stars ====
- Marcelo Buquet as Rubén del Olmo
- Lina Santos as Lourdes de Hernández
- Sergio Mayer as Bruno Morelli
- Eugenia Cauduro as Gloria Reyes
- Alexander Holtmann as Arnold Smith
- Daniela Romo as herself
- Adán Allende as Aaron
- Pilar Montenegro as Wanda Mey
- Verónica Montes as Susan Davis
