= La nieta elegida =

Colombian telenovela

- Genre: Telenovela
- Created by: Julio Jiménez; Iván Martínez
- Directed by: Rodrigo Lalinde; Consuelo González
- Starring: Consuelo Luzardo; Francisca Estévez; Carlos Torres; Juliette Pardau
- Composer: Alejandro Díaz
- Country of origin: Colombia
- Original language: Spanish
- No. of seasons: 1
- No. of episodes: 72

Production
- Executive producer: Nana Velásquez
- Production company: RCN Televisión

Original release
- Network: Canal RCN
- Release: 27 September 2021 – 1 February 2022

La nieta elegida (English: The Chosen Granddaughter) is a Colombian telenovela created by Julio Jiménez and Iván Martínez for RCN Televisión. It aired on Canal RCN from 27 September 2021 to 1 February 2022. The series stars Francisca Estévez, Carlos Torres, Juliette Pardau, and Consuelo Luzardo. Production began on 8 April 2021.

== Plot ==
Luisa (Francisca Estévez) is a young woman who, by order of her father, will be in an unknown world in order to take revenge on the Roldán family, but soon the affection that Sara (Consuelo Luzardo), her supposed grandmother, will give her and meeting Juan Esteban Osorno (Carlos Torres), the boyfriend of another of Sara's granddaughters, will cause Luisa to enter into a dilemma.

== Cast ==
- Consuelo Luzardo as Sara Roldán
- Francisca Estévez as Luisa Mayorga
- Carlos Torres as Juan Esteban "Juanes" Osorno
- Kepa Amuchastegui as Augusto Roldán
- Juan Pablo Gamboa as Nicolás Roldán
- Geraldine Zivic as María Consuelo Roldán
- Adriana Arango as Rosa Espinosa
- Marcela Benjumea as Esther
- Juliette Pardau as Vivian Roldán
- Sebastián Osorio as Milán Mayorga
- Stephania Duque as Laura Roldán
- Carlos Báez as Adrián Alvarado
- María José Camacho as Paola Alvarado
- Roz Urquijo as Lucas Alvarado
- Ricardo Vesga as Florentino Espartero
- Nayra Castillo as Lucrecia Villamil
- Mariam Castañeda as Elvira Loaiza
- Ana María Arango as Perpetua Bautista
- Marie Villarreal as Helena Hidalgo
- Silvia De Dios as Daniela Krogemann
- Patrick Delmas as Germán Osorno
- Claudio Cataño as Sergio Roldán
- Sebastián Boscán
- Héctor García as Braulio Mayorga
- Margalida Castro as Érika Bruner
- Cristina Campuzano as Olivia
- Orlando Valenzuela as Roberto Alvarado
- Alejandra Villafañe as Diana Cañedo

== Episodes ==
No.	Title	Original release date	Colombia viewers (Rating points)
1	"Luisa llega a vivir a la casa de los Roldán"	27 September 2021	7.5
2	"Vivian conoce a Luisa"	28 September 2021	7.4
3	"Luisa intenta acabar con su vida"	29 September 2021	7.2
4	"Las tensiones en la casa de los Roldán se salen de control"	30 September 2021	8.0
5	"Adrian intenta sobrepasarse con Luisa"	1 October 2021	7.6
6	"Luisa y Juan Esteban se conocen"	4 October 2021	8.3
7	"Luisa cae en una trampa"	5 October 2021	8.2
8	"Luisa se entera de que Juan Esteban se va a comprometer con Vivian"	6 October 2021	7.0
9	"Vivian le hace un fuerte reclamo a Luisa"	7 October 2021	7.5
10	"Un tensionante encuentro"	8 October 2021	7.7
11	"Juan Esteban le hace una dolorosa confesión a Vivian"	11 October 2021	7.9
12	"Luisa queda entre la espada y la pared"	12 October 2021	8.2
13	"Juanes le confiesa sus sentimientos a Luisa y la besa"	13 October 2021	7.4
14	"Sara cae en la trampa de Rosa y María Consuelo"	14 October 2021	7.6
15	"Juan Esteban le hace una tentadora propuesta a Luisa"	15 October 2021	7.7
16	"Luisa vive un escalofriante momento"	19 October 2021	7.6
17	"El estado de salud de Sara es poco alentador"	20 October 2021	7.8
18	"Juan Esteban toma la decisión de terminar su relación con Vivian"	21 October 2021	8.4
19	"Adrián pasa los límites con Luisa"	22 October 2021	7.6
20	"Juan Esteban se entera de lo sucedido entre Luisa y Adrián"	25 October 2021	9.7
21	"Vivian le pide otra oportunidad a Juan Esteban"	26 October 2021	7.1
22	"Vivian se deja llevar por la rabia"	27 October 2021	7.2
23	"Al llegar a la casa de Juanes, Luisa se encuentra una gran sorpresa"	28 October 2021	7.0
24	"Luisa deja en evidencia a Juanes delante de la familia Roldán"	29 October 2021	6.8
25	"Luisa sufre un accidente y su vida corre peligro"	2 November 2021	7.4
26	"La reacción de Juanes al saber que Luisa está en coma"	3 November 2021	8.3
27	"Luisa despierta"	4 November 2021	8.2
28	"Luisa le hace una confesión a Sara sobre su accidente"	5 November 2021	8.0
29	"Luisa le confiesa a Juanes que está enamorada de él"	8 November 2021	8.5
30	"María Consuelo confiesa que atentó contra la vida de Luisa"	9 November 2021	8.0
31	"Luisa recibe una grata noticia"	10 November 2021	8.5
32	"Sara toma una decisión que genera discordia en la familia"	11 November 2021	8.5
33	"Adrián golpea a Luisa y Augusto le pide que se vaya de la casa"	12 November 2021	6.7
34	"Luisa está dispuesta a acabar con los Roldán"	16 November 2021	7.4
35	"Vivian descubre a Juanes con Luisa"	17 November 2021	8.0
36	"Juanes le confiesa a Vivian lo que siente por Luisa"	18 November 2021	8.8
37	"Juanes encuentra a Luisa con Milán y se lleva una gran desilusión"	19 November 2021	7.3
38	"Luisa entre la espada y la pared"	22 November 2021	6.6
39	"Vivian y Juanes viven un apasionado momento"	23 November 2021	7.2
40	"Luisa recibe los resultados de la prueba de ADN"	24 November 2021	6.8
41	"Sara toma una decisión con respecto a la situación de Luisa"	25 November 2021	7.2
42	"Juanes evita que Luisa acabe con su vida"	26 November 2021	7.7
43	"Luisa le confiesa una verdad a Juanes y él se desilusiona"	29 November 2021	6.2
44	"Vivian se sale de sus casillas al encontrar a Luisa en la casa de Juanes"	30 November 2021	6.4
45	"La maldad de Vivian no tiene límites"	1 December 2021	5.9
46	"Milán resulta herido al intentar proteger a Juanes"	2 December 2021	6.4
47	"Laura enfrenta a Milán"	3 December 2021	5.8
48	"Milán le hace una inesperada confesión a Juanes"	6 December 2021	6.4
49	"Rosa le es infiel a Nicolás"	7 December 2021	3.3
50	"Juan Esteban confiesa formalmente su amor a Luisa"	9 December 2021	6.4
51	"Luisa le hace importante anuncio a la familia Roldán"	10 December 2021	6.2
52	"Luisa y Juanes le dieron rienda suelta a su amor"	13 December 2021	7.0
53	"Una gran verdad sale a flote"	14 December 2021	6.8
54	"Juanes le confiesa a Sara la verdadera relación de Luisa y Milán"	15 December 2021	6.9
55	"Milán se entera de las intenciones de Esther con Luisa"	16 December 2021	5.9
56	"Milán y Juanes rescatan a Luisa"	17 December 2021	6.7
57	"Suenan campanas de boda"	11 January 2022	6.6
58	"Sara se entera de que Perpetua está viva y la va a visitar"	12 January 2022	6.0
59	"Vivian se une con Braulio para hacerle daño a Luisa"	13 January 2022	7.1
60	"Luisa descubre que es hija de Sergio Roldán"	14 January 2022	6.1
61	"Braulio se sale con la suya y logra su objetivo"	17 January 2022	5.9
62	"Braulio atenta contra la vida de Luisa"	18 January 2022	7.0
63	"Sara se entera de quién es el verdadero asesino de Sergio"	19 January 2022	7.2
64	"Milán arruina el macabro plan de Braulio"	20 January 2022	6.9
65	"Milán cae en la trampa de Rosa y es llevado a la cárcel"	21 January 2022	7.3
66	"Arbey confiesa la verdad y deja en evidencia a Rosa"	24 January 2022	7.0
67	"Luisa destapa la mentira de Rosa Ivonne"	25 January 2022	7.3
68	"La maldad de Vivian no tiene límites"	26 January 2022	7.6
69	"Braulio atenta contra la vida de Juanes"	27 January 2022	7.9
70	"Se apaga una vida"	28 January 2022	7.0
71	"¿El futuro de Juanes se acaba?"	31 January 2022	7.4
72	"Luisa y Juanes fueron felices para siempre"	1 February 2022	9.3

== Reception ==
=== Ratings ===
Season	Timeslot (COT)	Episodes	First aired		Last aired		Avg. viewers (in points)
Season	Timeslot (COT)	Episodes	Date	Viewers (in points)	Date	Viewers (in points)	Avg. viewers (in points)
1	Mon–Fri 9:30 p.m.	72	27 September 2021	7.5	1 February 2022	9.3	7.26

=== Awards and nominations ===
Year	Award	Category	Nominee(s)	Result	Ref.
2022	India Catalina Awards	Best Telenovela or Series	La nieta elegida	Nominated	
2022	India Catalina Awards	Best Director	Rodrigo Lalinde, Consuelo González, and Alejandro Castaño	Won	
2022	India Catalina Awards	Best Supporting Actress	Marcela Benjumea	Won	
2022	India Catalina Awards	Best Newcomer Actor	Gregorio Urquijo	Nominated	
2022	India Catalina Awards	Best Editor	Silvia Ayala	Nominated	
