= Amar y vivir =

Colombian television series

- Genre: Telenovela
- Created by: Nubia Barreto
- Story by: Germán Escallón and Carlos Duplat
- Directed by: Liliana Bocanegra; Santiago Vargas
- Creative director: Clelly Arévalo
- Starring: Ana María Estupiñán; Carlos Torres
- Theme music composer: Fabio Alonso Salgado Mejía
- Opening theme: "Amar y vivir" by Ana María Estupiñán
- Country of origin: Colombia
- Original language: Spanish
- No. of seasons: 1
- No. of episodes: 63

Production
- Executive producer: Claudia Facio Lince
- Editor: Camilo Escobar
- Production company: Fox Telecolombia

Original release
- Network: Caracol Televisión
- Release: 7 January – 14 April 2020

Amar y vivir (English: Living to Love) is a Colombian telenovela produced by Fox Telecolombia that premiered on 7 January 2020 on Caracol Televisión, and ended on 14 April 2020. The series is created by Nubia Barreto based on the 1988 telenovela of the same name written by Germán Escallón and Carlos Duplat. It stars Ana María Estupiñán, and Carlos Torres.

== Plot ==
Irene (Ana María Estupiñán), the leading voice of the Los Milagrosos group in the market place, meets the mechanic Joaquín (Carlos Torres) when he arrives in the city with just the clothes on his back. They cross their destinies while fighting for their dreams, and will soon realize that they cannot live without each other, even though their struggle to be together will be intense and painful.

== Cast ==
=== Main ===
- Carlos Torres as Joaquín Herrera
- Ana María Estupiñán as Irene Romero
- Yuri Vargas as Rocío Galindo
- Jim Muñoz as Diego Portilla
- Julio Sánchez Cóccaro as Salvador Romero
- Alina Lozano as Magola de Romero
- Valeria Galvis as Alba Lucía Herrera
- Juan Millán as Bryan Portilla
- Juana del Río as Celeste Villamarín "La Chacha"
- Mario Duarte as Delio Villamizar
- Alex Páez as Humberto
- Isabel Gaona
- Vilma Vera as Elena
- Ivonne Gómez as Jenifer Solano
- Germán De Greiff as Michael
- Pedro Mogollón as Lubián Portilla
- Sandra Guzmán as Brighitte
- Lina Nieto as Yuri
- Jairo Ordóñez as Etilio Cuellar
- Alden Rojas as Peluche
- Xilena Aycardi as Julia Linero
- Camila Jiménez as Coronel Molina
- Gustavo Monsalve as Agente Padilla

=== Guest stars ===
- Paola Jara as Herself
- Franklin Gutierrez as a Judge of shows

== Episodes ==
No.	Title	Original release date	Colombia viewers (Rating points)
1	"Irene comienza una lucha en busca de su sueño de ser cantante"	7 January 2020	10.4
2	"¿Joaquín se está metiendo en la boca del lobo y pondrá su vida en peligro?"	8 January 2020	9.6
3	"Joaquín e Irene se declaran su amor con un apasionado beso"	9 January 2020	10.1
4	"¡El talento de Irene Romero la llevará a conocer a Paola Jara en vivo!"	10 January 2020	10.4
5	"Joaquín y Cuéllar se enfrentan en una pelea y quedan gravemente heridos"	13 January 2020	11.1
6	"¿Irene y Joaquín podrán cumplir su sueño de casarse?"	14 January 2020	12.3
7	"Irene está a punto de llevarse una gran decepción de Joaquín"	15 January 2020	12.1
8	"¿Joaquín podrá conseguir un nuevo trabajo y dejar la delincuencia?"	16 January 2020	11.3
9	"Episode 9"	17 January 2020	11.0
10	"Los Delios infunden miedo en la plaza con un gran incendio"	20 January 2020	11.3
11	"¿Joaquín y la Chacha podrán impedir el asesinato de Irene?"	22 January 2020	11.4
12	"Dinero, poder y hombres: Joaquín se convertirá en la mano derecha de Delio"	23 January 2020	11.3
13	"Irene debe tomar una difícil y triste decisión con su grupo de serenateros"	24 January 2020	11.2
14	"Hay cosas que el amor no entiende, Irene cada vez sospecha más de Joaquín"	28 January 2020	10.2
15	"Cuéllar planea unirse a Lauro para acabar con Joaquín"	29 January 2020	11.9
16	"La Chacha le cuenta a Irene toda la verdad de las desgracias de Joaquín"	31 January 2020	12.2
17	"¿Irene tomará valor y dejará a Joaquín?"	4 February 2020	10.8
18	"La realidad golpea duro a Salvador: Magola le pidió el divorcio"	5 February 2020	10.4
19	"¿Le romperá el corazón a Irene? El destino puso en el peor de los escenarios a Joaquín"	7 February 2020	10.9
20	"El corazón de Irene se quiebra y deja fluir todo su dolor cantando"	10 February 2020	10.8
21	"La verdad sale a flote: Irene descubre que Joaquín está preso"	11 February 2020	10.3
22	"Irene está dispuesta a todo con tal de ver a Joaquín, incluso arriesgar su vida"	12 February 2020	11.0
23	"Delio llega a la pensión por Alba y se enfrenta con Irene"	13 February 2020	10.8
24	"Sueño cumplido: Irene ofrece un show espectacular con Jessi Uribe"	14 February 2020	10.4
25	"Contra todo pronóstico, Joaquín quedó en libertad"	17 February 2020	10.5
26	"Salvador descubre el nuevo robo planeado y liderado por Joaquín"	18 February 2020	10.1
27	"Joaquín pone en marcha un plan para hacer caer a Delio Villamizar"	19 February 2020	11.2
28	"¿Joaquín será capaz de entregar a Delio Villamizar?"	20 February 2020	11.8
29	"La policía y Los Delios se enfrentan en la fuga de Delio Villamizar"	21 February 2020	11.0
30	"Joaquín se juega todo por ir a conocer a su hija"	24 February 2020	10.9
31	"Joaquín inyecta dinero sucio al restaurante de Diego e Irene sospecha"	25 February 2020	10.3
32	"Irene descubre que Joaquín es el verdadero socio de Diego"	26 February 2020	11.4
33	"Diego habla con la coronel Molina del engaño de Joaquín"	27 February 2020	12.1
34	"Julia se encarga de que Irene esté en boca de todo el mundo"	28 February 2020	11.3
35	"Cuellar logra escaparse de la cárcel con ayuda de su mamá"	2 March 2020	11.9
36	"Gracias a su infiltrada, la coronel Molina descubre los secretos de Los Delios"	3 March 2020	11.1
37	"Los Delios no descansarán hasta encontrar al sapo, ¿descubrirán a la infiltrada?"	4 March 2020	10.8
38	"Irene llora desconsoladamente la supuesta muerte de Joaquín"	5 March 2020	11.9
39	"Irene está convencida de la muerte de Joaquín y llora desconsoladamente"	6 March 2020	12.8
40	"El barman del gril revela la verdadera identidad del asesino de Joaquín y Laura"	9 March 2020	12.0
41	"Diego llama a su restaurante 'La Tarima de la Milagrosa' en honor a Irene"	10 March 2020	12.2
42	"La verdad está cerca, la coronel Molina sospecha que Joaquín está vivo"	11 March 2020	12.5
43	"Buenas noticias, Irene vuelve a recibir llamadas para dar toques"	12 March 2020	11.9
44	"Joaquín decide volver al país y recuperar a Irene"	13 March 2020	11.3
45	"Joaquín regresa y le declara la guerra a Cuellar"	16 March 2020	12.8
46	"Salvador y Briggite pasan una noche llena de pasión"	17 March 2020	12.2
47	"A pocos días de casarse con Diego, Irene no deja de llorar a Joaquín"	18 March 2020	12.3
48	"Joaquín está cada vez más cerca de Irene"	19 March 2020	12.9
49	"¡Magola y Briggite se agarrán del pelo en plena plaza!"	20 March 2020	13.3
50	"La coronel Molina monta un operativo esperando a que Joaquín aparezca"	24 March 2020	14.3
51	"Diego Portilla decide regresar a Europa tras su ruptura con Irene"	25 March 2020	13.7
52	"Julia intenta dañar nuevamente la reputación de Irene"	26 March 2020	13.3
53	"Irene se desespera al saber que su hija está con Joaquín"	27 March 2020	14.1
54	"La coronel Molina sigue tras el rastro de Joaquín y busca a su familia"	30 March 2020	13.0
55	"Joaquín le da una importante misión a Maicol"	31 March 2020	13.5
56	"Rochi le confiesa a Irene lo que siente por Diego Portilla"	1 April 2020	13.6
57	"Yuri es detenida por ser parte de Los Delios"	2 April 2020	12.4
58	"Joaquín se anticipa e impide que Irene salga de su casa"	3 April 2020	11.6
59	"Irene logra ver la gran obsesión que Cuéllar tiene por ella"	6 April 2020	15.0
60	"Los planes de Cuéllar cambian y ahora quiere matar a Irene"	7 April 2020	14.2
61	"Joaquín se las ingenia para que Yuri no arruine sus planes de entregarse"	8 April 2020	13.0
62	"Cuéllar planea todo para matar a Irene en el Gran Concierto del Despecho"	13 April 2020	14.1
63	"¿Joaquín e Irene podrán cumplir sus promesas?"	14 April 2020	15.4

== Release ==
Amar y vivir premiered on Caracol Televisión on 7 January 2020. Internationally, the show began streaming on Netflix on 26 June 2020, under the title All for Love.

== Reception ==
=== Ratings ===
Viewership and ratings per season of Amar y vivir
Season	Timeslot (ET)	Episodes	First aired		Last aired		Avg. viewers (millions)	18–49 rank
Season	Timeslot (ET)	Episodes	Date	Viewers (millions)	Date	Viewers (millions)	Avg. viewers (millions)	18–49 rank
1	Mon–Fri 9:00pm	63	7 January 2020	10.4	14 April 2020	15.4	TBD	TBD

=== Awards and nominations ===
Year	Award	Category	Nominated	Result	Ref
2020	Produ Awards	Best Telenovela	Amar y vivir	Nominated	
2020	Produ Awards	Best Music Theme	Amar y vivir	Nominated	
2020	Produ Awards	Best Producer	Claudia Fasciolince	Nominated	
2020	Produ Awards	Best Music Composer	Nicolás Uribe, Sebastián Luengas and David Arias	Nominated	
2021	India Catalina Awards	Best Supporting Actress	Yuri Vargas	Nominated	
2021	India Catalina Awards	Best Music Director	Nicolas Uribe, David Arias and Sebastián Luengas	Nominated	

== Music ==
Amar y vivir

Soundtrack album by Various artists
- Released: 7 January 2020
- Recorded: 2019–2020
- Label: Caracol Televisión

Singles from Amar y vivir
- 1. "Amar y vivir" Released: January 7, 2020

The first soundtrack of the series, titled Amar y vivir, was released on 7 January 2020.

Standard edition
No.	Title	Length
1.	"Amar y vivir"	2:26
2.	"Amor de apariencias"	2:22
3.	"Cuando estoy contigo"	2:40
4.	"Me duele"	2:15
5.	"Nueva ilusión"	3:19
6.	"Amigos especiales"	2:05
7.	"Disculpe Irene"	2:16
8.	"Cuando estoy contigo" (Romantic Version)	2:49
9.	"Indecente"	2:29
10.	"Maldito traidor" (Explicit)	2:59
11.	"Regalo divino"	3:25
Total length:		29:05
