= List of The Queen of Flow episodes =

The following is a list of episodes from the Colombian television series, The Queen of Flow.

As of 21 April 2026, 235 episodes of The Queen of Flow have aired, concluding the third season.

== Series overview ==
| Season | Episodes | Originally released | |
| Season | Episodes | First released | Last released |
|---|---|---|---|
| 1 | 82 | 12 June 2018 | 9 October 2018 |
| 2 | 90 | 26 April 2021 | 10 September 2021 |
| 3 | 65 | 13 January 2026 | 21 April 2026 |

== Episodes ==
=== Season 1 (2018) ===
| No. overall | No. in season | Title | Original release date | Colombia viewers (Rating points) |
|---|---|---|---|---|
| 1 | 1 | "Episode 1" | 12 June 2018 | 15.4 |
In one of the communes in the northeast area of the City of Medellín, a young woman named Yeimy spends her free time composing songs, but just then one of the men who commit extortion in the neighborhood comes to the door of her house to ask her parents to pay the monthly payment for the corresponding month. Elsewhere, Charlie is heading to participate in the music contest, but because he was late, the judges ask him to improvise a new theme to captivate the public. After seeing the disastrous performance of the boys who appeared at the event, Yeimy tells her grandmother that she is thinking of singing her compositions, although she is a little scared to have to go on stage.
| 2 | 2 | "Episode 2" | 13 June 2018 | 14.9 |
When finding her parents dead, Yeimy searches for her grandmother and she tells her that apparently the people who murdered them were the same people who collect the extorted money in the neighborhood. After learning this, the young woman decides to go to the authorities to make a spoken portrait of the alleged perpetrator. On the other hand, Juancho is looking for a way to raise money for the burial of his neighbors and Charlie, together with his mother and uncle, are looking for Yeimy to give him their deepest condolences. Later, Duver thinks that it is a good idea to take advantage of the situation that the Montoya daughter is going through to buy her house and the bakery at a very good price.
| 3 | 3 | "Episode 3" | 14 June 2018 | 14.2 |
After his uncle's assignment, Charlie searches for him to tell him that he inadvertently shot one of the health center's security guards and is now very distressed that someone has recognized him. Meanwhile, Yeimy remembers the tattoo Charlie got since she is sure that he was the person who robbed the medical center and Juancho tells his best friend what happened to Yeimy and his grandmother again. Later, Doña Carmen tells Duver that she is very distressed since she owes some accounts in the bank and now she is afraid of losing the only thing that she and her granddaughter have. Engracia looks for Juancho to offer him a deal in exchange for not losing his brothers.
| 4 | 4 | "Episode 4" | 15 June 2018 | 14.4 |
| 5 | 5 | "Episode 5" | 18 June 2018 | 15.4 |
| 6 | 6 | "Episode 6" | 19 June 2018 | 16.5 |
| 7 | 7 | "Episode 7" | 20 June 2018 | 17.0 |
| 8 | 8 | "Episode 8" | 21 June 2018 | 16.2 |
| 9 | 9 | "Episode 9" | 22 June 2018 | 15.7 |
| 10 | 10 | "Episode 10" | 25 June 2018 | 16.5 |
| 11 | 11 | "Episode 11" | 26 June 2018 | 16.0 |
| 12 | 12 | "Episode 12" | 27 June 2018 | 15.2 |
| 13 | 13 | "Episode 13" | 28 June 2018 | 16.4 |
| 14 | 14 | "Episode 14" | 29 June 2018 | 14.0 |
| 15 | 15 | "Episode 15" | 3 July 2018 | 15.2 |
| 16 | 16 | "Episode 16" | 4 July 2018 | 16.3 |
| 17 | 17 | "Episode 17" | 5 July 2018 | 16.5 |
| 18 | 18 | "Episode 18" | 6 July 2018 | 16.0 |
| 19 | 19 | "Episode 19" | 9 July 2018 | 15.2 |
| 20 | 20 | "Episode 20" | 10 July 2018 | 15.4 |
| 21 | 21 | "Episode 21" | 11 July 2018 | 15.3 |
| 22 | 22 | "Episode 22" | 12 July 2018 | 15.0 |
| 23 | 23 | "Episode 23" | 13 July 2018 | 15.4 |
| 24 | 24 | "Episode 24" | 16 July 2018 | 16.6 |
| 25 | 25 | "Episode 25" | 17 July 2018 | 16.1 |
| 26 | 26 | "Episode 26" | 18 July 2018 | 15.3 |
| 27 | 27 | "Episode 27" | 19 July 2018 | 14.6 |
| 28 | 28 | "Episode 28" | 23 July 2018 | 16.6 |
| 29 | 29 | "Episode 29" | 24 July 2018 | 15.8 |
| 30 | 30 | "Episode 30" | 25 July 2018 | 15.7 |
| 31 | 31 | "Episode 31" | 26 July 2018 | 15.8 |
| 32 | 32 | "Episode 32" | 27 July 2018 | 15.0 |
| 33 | 33 | "Episode 33" | 30 July 2018 | 15.6 |
| 34 | 34 | "Episode 34" | 31 July 2018 | 16.1 |
| 35 | 35 | "Episode 35" | 1 August 2018 | 16.1 |
| 36 | 36 | "Episode 36" | 2 August 2018 | 16.4 |
| 37 | 37 | "Episode 37" | 3 August 2018 | 14.8 |
| 38 | 38 | "Episode 38" | 6 August 2018 | 14.6 |
| 39 | 39 | "Episode 39" | 8 August 2018 | 15.6 |
| 40 | 40 | "Episode 40" | 9 August 2018 | 15.0 |
| 41 | 41 | "Episode 41" | 10 August 2018 | 14.5 |
| 42 | 42 | "Episode 42" | 13 August 2018 | 15.9 |
| 43 | 43 | "Episode 43" | 14 August 2018 | 16.4 |
| 44 | 44 | "Episode 44" | 15 August 2018 | 14.9 |
| 45 | 45 | "Episode 45" | 16 August 2018 | 14.6 |
| 46 | 46 | "Episode 46" | 17 August 2018 | 13.2 |
| 47 | 47 | "Episode 47" | 21 August 2018 | 15.9 |
| 48 | 48 | "Episode 48" | 22 August 2018 | 15.7 |
| 49 | 49 | "Episode 49" | 23 August 2018 | 15.4 |
| 50 | 50 | "Episode 50" | 24 August 2018 | 15.1 |
| 51 | 51 | "Episode 51" | 27 August 2018 | 16.3 |
| 52 | 52 | "Episode 52" | 28 August 2018 | 16.2 |
| 53 | 53 | "Episode 53" | 29 August 2018 | 17.3 |
| 54 | 54 | "Episode 54" | 30 August 2018 | 15.3 |
| 55 | 55 | "Episode 55" | 31 August 2018 | 15.0 |
| 56 | 56 | "Episode 56" | 3 September 2018 | 16.8 |
| 57 | 57 | "Episode 57" | 4 September 2018 | 17.6 |
| 58 | 58 | "Episode 58" | 5 September 2018 | 17.1 |
| 59 | 59 | "Episode 59" | 6 September 2018 | 17.5 |
| 60 | 60 | "Episode 60" | 7 September 2018 | 19.2 |
| 61 | 61 | "Episode 61" | 10 September 2018 | 17.7 |
| 62 | 62 | "Episode 62" | 11 September 2018 | 19.7 |
| 63 | 63 | "Episode 63" | 12 September 2018 | 18.4 |
| 64 | 64 | "Episode 64" | 13 September 2018 | 16.4 |
| 65 | 65 | "Episode 65" | 14 September 2018 | 18.6 |
| 66 | 66 | "Episode 66" | 17 September 2018 | 18.9 |
| 67 | 67 | "Episode 67" | 18 September 2018 | 18.4 |
| 68 | 68 | "Episode 68" | 19 September 2018 | 19.9 |
| 69 | 69 | "Episode 69" | 20 September 2018 | 20.6 |
| 70 | 70 | "Episode 70" | 21 September 2018 | 19.2 |
| 71 | 71 | "Episode 71" | 24 September 2018 | 20.6 |
| 72 | 72 | "Episode 72" | 25 September 2018 | 20.2 |
| 73 | 73 | "Episode 73" | 26 September 2018 | 20.7 |
| 74 | 74 | "Episode 74" | 27 September 2018 | 20.5 |
| 75 | 75 | "Episode 75" | 28 September 2018 | 18.1 |
| 76 | 76 | "Episode 76" | 1 October 2018 | 20.1 |
| 77 | 77 | "Episode 77" | 2 October 2018 | 19.3 |
| 78 | 78 | "Episode 78" | 3 October 2018 | 18.9 |
| 79 | 79 | "Episode 79" | 4 October 2018 | 19.5 |
| 80 | 80 | "Episode 80" | 5 October 2018 | 17.7 |
| 81 | 81 | "Episode 81" | 8 October 2018 | 20.4 |
| 82 | 82 | "Episode 82" | 9 October 2018 | 21.7 |

=== Season 2 (2021) ===
| No. overall | No. in season | Title | Original release date | Colombia viewers (Rating points) |
|---|---|---|---|---|
| 83 | 1 | "El recuerdo de Charly Flow vuelve a atormentar a Yeimy" | 26 April 2021 | 14.9 |
| 84 | 2 | "Manín tiene el objetivo de acabar con Yeimy Montoya" | 27 April 2021 | 12.4 |
| 85 | 3 | "Charly sale de la carcel dispuesto a demostrar su cambio" | 28 April 2021 | 13.5 |
| 86 | 4 | "Alergia detona una bomba en el restaurante de Ligia" | 29 April 2021 | 13.9 |
| 87 | 5 | "Manín visita el restaurante para ver a Ligia" | 30 April 2021 | 12.2 |
| 88 | 6 | "Catalina quiere recuperar a su hijo" | 3 May 2021 | 11.8 |
| 89 | 7 | "Juancho confronta a Yeimy por la canción en la que estuvo trabajando" | 4 May 2021 | 12.0 |
| 90 | 8 | "Se prepara la inauguración de Grey Shark" | 5 May 2021 | 12.3 |
| 91 | 9 | "Irma recibe la propuesta de unirse a Grey Shark" | 6 May 2021 | 12.7 |
| 92 | 10 | "Yeimy se lanza como cantante" | 7 May 2021 | 11.5 |
| 93 | 11 | "Yeimy habla con Olga sobre el lanzamiento de 'Fijación'" | 10 May 2021 | 12.5 |
| 94 | 12 | "Contreras logra capturar a Dina" | 11 May 2021 | 12.5 |
| 95 | 13 | "Manín planea un atentado en contra de Yeimy" | 12 May 2021 | 12.3 |
| 96 | 14 | "Charly graba su videoclip musical y dispara su carrera" | 13 May 2021 | 11.3 |
| 97 | 15 | "Yeimy graba su video con una idea sencilla pero poderosa" | 14 May 2021 | 11.6 |
| 98 | 16 | "Yeimy y Charly se enfrentan en un duelo musical" | 18 May 2021 | 11.2 |
| 99 | 17 | "Yeimy es protagonista de un supuesto triángulo amoroso" | 19 May 2021 | 11.6 |
| 100 | 18 | "Manín planea usar a Caronte de carnada para encontrar a Don Edgar" | 20 May 2021 | 10.5 |
| 101 | 19 | "Charly recibe una sorpresa por parte de Mike Rivera" | 21 May 2021 | 11.1 |
| 102 | 20 | "Yeimy intenta impresionar a Orlando en su presentación con Grupo Do2" | 24 May 2021 | 10.8 |
| 103 | 21 | "Manín planea destruir a Surround y atacar a Juancho" | 25 May 2021 | 10.7 |
| 104 | 22 | "Charly besa a Yeimy durante la grabación del comercial" | 26 May 2021 | 11.2 |
| 105 | 23 | "Charly habla bien de Yeimy mientras acompaña a Erik en la UCI" | 27 May 2021 | 11.1 |
| 106 | 24 | "Mike niega su responsabilidad con las imágenes virales de Charly y Yeimy" | 28 May 2021 | 10.0 |
| 107 | 25 | "Yeimy averigua si Manín está vivo" | 31 May 2021 | 12.4 |
| 108 | 26 | "José ve algo sospechoso en el cultivo de flores que le costará la vida" | 1 June 2021 | 12.6 |
| 109 | 27 | "Yeimy enfrenta a Charly y le dice que ya sabe que Manín está vivo" | 2 June 2021 | 12.7 |
| 110 | 28 | "Yeimy pretende encontrar a Don Édgar para producir una guerra entre él y Manín" | 4 June 2021 | 9.0 |
| 111 | 29 | "Búho logra conseguir una cita entre Don Edgar y Yeimy" | 8 June 2021 | 12.2 |
| 112 | 30 | "Erik encuentra el cuerpo de José" | 9 June 2021 | 12.6 |
| 113 | 31 | "Manín sale a la luz" | 10 June 2021 | 11.7 |
| 114 | 32 | "Yeimy declara en contra de Manín ante la prensa" | 11 June 2021 | 11.2 |
| 115 | 33 | "Botero le promete a Ligia investigar a fondo la muerte de José" | 15 June 2021 | 11.1 |
| 116 | 34 | "Juancho discute fuertemente con Yeimy por la nota de Zulma" | 16 June 2021 | 12.0 |
| 117 | 35 | "Mike Rivera trata de llevarse a Sandee a Grey Shark" | 17 June 2021 | 11.7 |
| 118 | 36 | "Manín pone en marcha el plan para hundir a Juancho" | 18 June 2021 | 10.0 |
| 119 | 37 | "Ligia se ofrece como carnada para atrapar a Manín" | 21 June 2021 | 10.5 |
| 120 | 38 | "Botero enfrenta a Manín tras descubrir su fachada como Albeiro Rosales" | 22 June 2021 | 11.2 |
| 121 | 39 | "Drama Key le confiesa a Irma la atracción que siente por ella" | 23 June 2021 | 12.1 |
| 122 | 40 | "Titano ejecuta su plan para acabar con Yeimy" | 24 June 2021 | 11.6 |
| 123 | 41 | "Charly logra impedir que Titano mate a Yeimy" | 25 June 2021 | 11.5 |
| 124 | 42 | "Juancho es detenido tras el falso testimonio de su contador" | 28 June 2021 | 11.4 |
| 125 | 43 | "La inminente guerra entre Manín y Don Édgar es detenida por Charly" | 29 June 2021 | 11.3 |
| 126 | 44 | "Juancho trata de contactar a Totono en la cárcel" | 30 June 2021 | 11.5 |
| 127 | 45 | "Drama Key le cuenta a Erik que se acostó con Irma" | 1 July 2021 | 11.0 |
| 128 | 46 | "Yeimy pide ayuda a sus fans para encontrar a Titano" | 2 July 2021 | 9.9 |
| 129 | 47 | "Botero interroga a Garrido y logra salvarle la vida" | 7 July 2021 | 10.8 |
| 130 | 48 | "Botero le declara su amor a Ligia, pero ella teme por su vida" | 8 July 2021 | 11.7 |
| 131 | 49 | "Charly le deja claro a Yeimy que la ama y que no se va a ir de su lado" | 9 July 2021 | 11.2 |
| 132 | 50 | "Botero descubre que Sorzano es el informante de Manín" | 12 July 2021 | 10.7 |
| 133 | 51 | "Totono es asesinado en la carcel por orden de Caronte y Titano" | 13 July 2021 | 10.7 |
| 134 | 52 | "Manín quiere incriminar Juancho en la muerte de Totono" | 14 July 2021 | 10.1 |
| 135 | 53 | "Don Edgar decide investigar Silvia para despejar sus dudas" | 15 July 2021 | 10.5 |
| 136 | 54 | "Yeimy confiesa a Juancho y Erik que se acosto con Charly" | 16 July 2021 | 10.5 |
| 137 | 55 | "Manín y Silvia le tienden una trampa a Don Edgar" | 19 July 2021 | 11.0 |
| 138 | 56 | "Silvia le dice a Charly que quiere dejar la misión" | 21 July 2021 | 10.7 |
| 139 | 57 | "Yeimy se enfoca obsesivamente en el trabajo" | 22 July 2021 | 10.7 |
| 140 | 58 | "Titano finge ser una mujer extranjera para estar al frente del bar" | 23 July 2021 | 10.2 |
| 141 | 59 | "Yeimy le admite a Charly que ya lo perdono" | 26 July 2021 | 10.7 |
| 142 | 60 | "Juancho despide a Yeimy de Surround" | 27 July 2021 | 10.1 |
| 143 | 61 | "Juancho expone públicamente la relación de Yeimy y Charly" | 28 July 2021 | 10.0 |
| 144 | 62 | "Titano secuestra a Clarkson" | 29 July 2021 | 10.4 |
| 145 | 63 | "Irma pierde un importante contrato para Grey Shark" | 30 July 2021 | 10.2 |
| 146 | 64 | "Yeimy decide alejarse de Charly y terminar su relación" | 2 August 2021 | 10.1 |
| 147 | 65 | "Yeimy anuncia ante los medios su firma con Grey Shark" | 3 August 2021 | 10.9 |
| 148 | 66 | "Mike mueve sus fichas y acusa de plagio a Surround" | 4 August 2021 | 10.7 |
| 149 | 67 | "La DEA aprueba la colaboración de Charly para capturar a Manín" | 5 August 2021 | 10.8 |
| 150 | 68 | "Charly falla en el operativo de la DEA para capturar a Manín" | 6 August 2021 | 9.8 |
| 151 | 69 | "Manín intenta conquistar a Ligia a pesar de su negativa" | 9 August 2021 | 11.0 |
| 152 | 70 | "Titano acepta el intercambio de Yeimy por Ligia" | 10 August 2021 | 11.1 |
| 153 | 71 | "Ligia arruina los planes para su rescate por temor" | 11 August 2021 | 11.3 |
| 154 | 72 | "Manín le pide a Charly matar a Juancho" | 12 August 2021 | 11.3 |
| 155 | 73 | "La caleta de Manín es descubierta" | 13 August 2021 | 9.7 |
| 156 | 74 | "Charly y Manín se enfrentan a tiros" | 17 August 2021 | 12.0 |
| 157 | 75 | "La foto del supuesto cadáver de Juancho se difunde" | 18 August 2021 | 11.9 |
| 158 | 76 | "Caronte llama a Botero para negociar su entrega" | 19 August 2021 | 12.4 |
| 159 | 77 | "Titano se cuela en Surround e intenta matar a Yeimy" | 20 August 2021 | 11.7 |
| 160 | 78 | "Manín es abatido por Ligia" | 23 August 2021 | 12.5 |
| 161 | 79 | "Titano planea fugarse para cumplir con su venganza" | 24 August 2021 | 13.5 |
| 162 | 80 | "Titano toma un veneno para su fuga" | 25 August 2021 | 12.0 |
| 163 | 81 | "Titano culpa a Charly de su envenenamiento" | 26 August 2021 | 12.1 |
| 164 | 82 | "Titano escapa del hospital con ayuda de Meñeco y Samurai" | 27 August 2021 | 10.3 |
| 165 | 83 | "Titano planea llegarle a Yeimy por medio de Erik para cumplir su venganza" | 30 August 2021 | 12.5 |
| 166 | 84 | "Catalina le confiesa a Juancho sobre el robo de la canción de Sandee" | 31 August 2021 | 11.2 |
| 167 | 85 | "Titano tortura a Erik luego de que no cooperara con sus órdenes" | 1 September 2021 | 12.1 |
| 168 | 86 | "Revive los mejores momentos de La Reina del Flow 2" | 3 September 2021 | 9.4 |
| 169 | 87 | "Titano muere en medio de una misión de rescate" | 6 September 2021 | 12.9 |
| 170 | 88 | "Yeimy, Charly y Juancho empiezan a trabajar en un nuevo proyecto musical" | 7 September 2021 | 11.6 |
| 171 | 89 | "Juancho y Mike discuten públicamente sobre quién tiene la mejor productora" | 8 September 2021 | 13.1 |
| 172 | 90 | "Mike es capturado por la Policía y llevado a prisión" | 10 September 2021 | 13.3 |

=== Season 3 (2026) ===
| No. overall | No. in season | Title | Original release date | Colombia viewers (Rating points) |
|---|---|---|---|---|
| 173 | 1 | "Charly emprende la búsqueda para encontrar a Yeimy" | 13 January 2026 | 7.4 |
| 174 | 2 | "Charly suspende su gira tras la desaparición de Yeimy" | 14 January 2026 | 5.9 |
| 175 | 3 | "Dejan de buscar a Yeimy, pero Charly hace plan para dar con ella" | 15 January 2026 | 5.9 |
| 176 | 4 | "El pasado vuelve a tocar la puerta de Charly en medio de la desaparición de Yeimy" | 16 January 2026 | 6.4 |
| 177 | 5 | "Yeimy aparece viva en la selva, pero no recuerda quién es" | 19 January 2026 | 6.8 |
| 178 | 6 | "Sky entra a Soul & Bass y empieza a trabajar con Charly" | 20 January 2026 | 5.8 |
| 179 | 7 | "Explota bomba en la casa de Charly y Ángel queda herido" | 21 January 2026 | 5.7 |
| 180 | 8 | "Charly y la familia dan por muerta a Yeimy y hacen entierro" | 22 January 2026 | 5.6 |
| 181 | 9 | "Yeimy se entera de que es famosa, intenta escapar y la hieren" | 23 January 2026 | 5.5 |
| 182 | 10 | "Yeimy tiene grave herida en la cabeza, luego de golpe, y está muy mal" | 26 January 2026 | 5.9 |
| 183 | 11 | "Sale a la luz video del accidente de Yeimy y le arruinan momento a Charly" | 27 January 2026 | 6.2 |
| 184 | 12 | "Sky se queda a dormida en casa de Charly y Soraya se pone celosa" | 28 January 2026 | 5.7 |
| 185 | 13 | "Sky confiesa que siente algo por Charly e intenta alejarse" | 29 January 2026 | 5.7 |
| 186 | 14 | "Charly lucha por su vida, luego de recibir una puñalada" | 30 January 2026 | 6.6 |
| 187 | 15 | "Charly despierta en el hospital y Sky renuncia a Soul & Bass" | 2 February 2026 | 6.0 |
| 188 | 16 | "Charly le pide a Sky que vuelva a Soul & Bass" | 3 February 2026 | 5.9 |
| 189 | 17 | "Ligia pelea con Charly por conexión que él tiene con Sky" | 4 February 2026 | 5.6 |
| 190 | 18 | "Charly empieza a sentir cosas por Sky y pasan día familiar con Alma" | 5 February 2026 | 5.6 |
| 191 | 19 | "Charly piensa que Sky es aliada de Mike y lo está traicionando" | 6 February 2026 | 5.6 |
| 192 | 20 | "Charly le dice a Sky que ya no va a ser el productor de su álbum" | 9 February 2026 | 6.3 |
| 193 | 21 | "Sky besa a Charly y le confiesa que está enamorada de él" | 10 February 2026 | 6.5 |
| 194 | 22 | "Hieren a Erik y le dicen a Charly que hay un infiltrado en Soul & Bass" | 11 February 2026 | 6.1 |
| 195 | 23 | "Yeimy se entera de que Charly es su esposo y Erik, su hijo" | 12 February 2026 | 6.4 |
| 196 | 24 | "Yeimy regresa a Medellín y tiene un recuerdo cantando con Charly" | 13 February 2026 | 5.6 |
| 197 | 25 | "Charly y Sky se dejan llevar y dan rienda suelta a la pasión" | 16 February 2026 | 6.6 |
| 198 | 26 | "Irma se entera de que Yeimy está viva, luego de que es raptada" | 17 February 2026 | 6.9 |
| 199 | 27 | "Charly se acerca al paradero de Yeimy e Irma" | 18 February 2026 | 5.6 |
| 200 | 28 | "Yeimy se entera de la relación de Charly y Sky" | 19 February 2026 | 5.4 |
| 201 | 29 | "Yeimy intenta escapar de la prisión de Mike, pero está muy débil" | 20 February 2026 | 5.8 |
| 202 | 30 | "Yeimy e Irma regresan a casa tras huir de Mike" | 23 February 2026 | 6.9 |
| 203 | 31 | "Yeimy sale del hospital y se reencuentra con Charly" | 24 February 2026 | 6.8 |
| 204 | 32 | "Yeimy conoce a Sky tras la salida de Charly de la cárcel" | 25 February 2026 | 6.3 |
| 205 | 33 | "Yeimy es diagnosticada con rara enfermedad" | 26 February 2026 | 5.7 |
| 206 | 34 | "Yeimy viaja a Guatapé y se entera de dolorosa noticia" | 27 February 2026 | 6.4 |
| 207 | 35 | "Mike sabotea el concierto que marca el regreso de Yeimy" | 2 March 2026 | 5.8 |
| 208 | 36 | "Yeimy sufre una descompensación en el concierto" | 3 March 2026 | 5.5 |
| 209 | 37 | "El secreto sobre la salud de Yeimy se convierte en una bomba de tiempo" | 4 March 2026 | 5.9 |
| 210 | 38 | "Yeimy le pide a Charly escoger entre ella y Sky" | 5 March 2026 | 5.7 |
| 211 | 39 | "Yeimy se desmaya en pleno espectáculo frente a Charly" | 6 March 2026 | 5.1 |
| 212 | 40 | "Charly se entera que Yeimy morirá pronto debido a su enfermedad" | 9 March 2026 | 5.8 |
| 213 | 41 | "Yeimy muere rodeada de sus seres queridos" | 10 March 2026 | 5.5 |
| 214 | 42 | "Charly, Erick y toda la familia despiden a Yeimy en su funeral" | 11 March 2026 | 5.9 |
| 215 | 43 | "Sky renuncia a Soul & Bass tras la muerte de Yeimy" | 12 March 2026 | 6.1 |
| 216 | 44 | "Irma y Sky pelean por quién reemplazará a Yeimy" | 13 March 2026 | 5.7 |
| 217 | 45 | "Aspa culpa públicamente a Mike por la muerte de Yeimy" | 16 March 2026 | 5.2 |
| 218 | 46 | "Aspa, controlado por Mike, acusa a Charly de planear la muerte de Yeimy" | 17 March 2026 | 5.0 |
| 219 | 47 | "Mike le tiende una trampa a Charly, y Ángel queda herido" | 18 March 2026 | 5.5 |
| 220 | 48 | "Irma y Sky hacen las paces tras enfrentamiento en público" | 19 March 2026 | 5.4 |
| 221 | 49 | "Charly encuentra a Sky besándose con Meteoro" | 20 March 2026 | 5.4 |
| 222 | 50 | "Charly anuncia que sacará nuevo álbum en honor a Yeimy" | 24 March 2026 | 5.2 |
| 223 | 51 | "Ligia descubre que Aspa en realidad es Charly" | 25 March 2026 | 5.3 |
| 224 | 52 | "Charly es citado por Botero a dar una declaración libre" | 27 March 2026 | 4.9 |
| 225 | 53 | "Genoveva le propone a Charly aliarse en contra de Mike" | 30 March 2026 | 4.6 |
| 226 | 54 | "Video del secuestro de Yeimy e Irma sale a la luz" | 31 March 2026 | 4.3 |
| 227 | 55 | "Charly ve el video del secuestro de Irma y Yeimy" | 1 April 2026 | 5.4 |
| 228 | 56 | "Mike es capturado en medio del secuestro de Sky" | 6 April 2026 | 5.0 |
| 229 | 57 | "Sale a la luz el secuestro de Sky a manos de Mike" | 7 April 2026 | 4.6 |
| 230 | 58 | "Mike es condenado a 20 años de prisión sin medida de excarcelación" | 8 April 2926 | 5.4 |
| 231 | 59 | "Erick le propone matrimonio a Irma en una romántica cena" | 9 April 2026 | 4.8 |
| 232 | 60 | "Genoveva secuestra a Charly y se lleva susto por posible sobredosis" | 13 April 2026 | 4.9 |
| 233 | 61 | "Genoveva le confiesa a Charly que es la mente maestra de los planes de Mike" | 15 April 2026 | 4.3 |
| 234 | 62 | "Charly le deja a su familia una carta de despedida" | 16 April 2026 | 4.9 |
| 235 | 63 | "Sky descubre pista en la carta de Charly y lo rescata" | 17 April 2026 | 4.9 |
| 236 | 64 | "Genoveva ejecuta su plan de envenenar a Charly y su familia" | 20 April 2026 | 5.2 |
| 237 | 65 | "Erick e Irma se casan en la espera de un bebé" | 21 April 2026 | TBD |
