= Gus Rodríguez =

Mexican screenwriter and video game journalist (1958–2020)

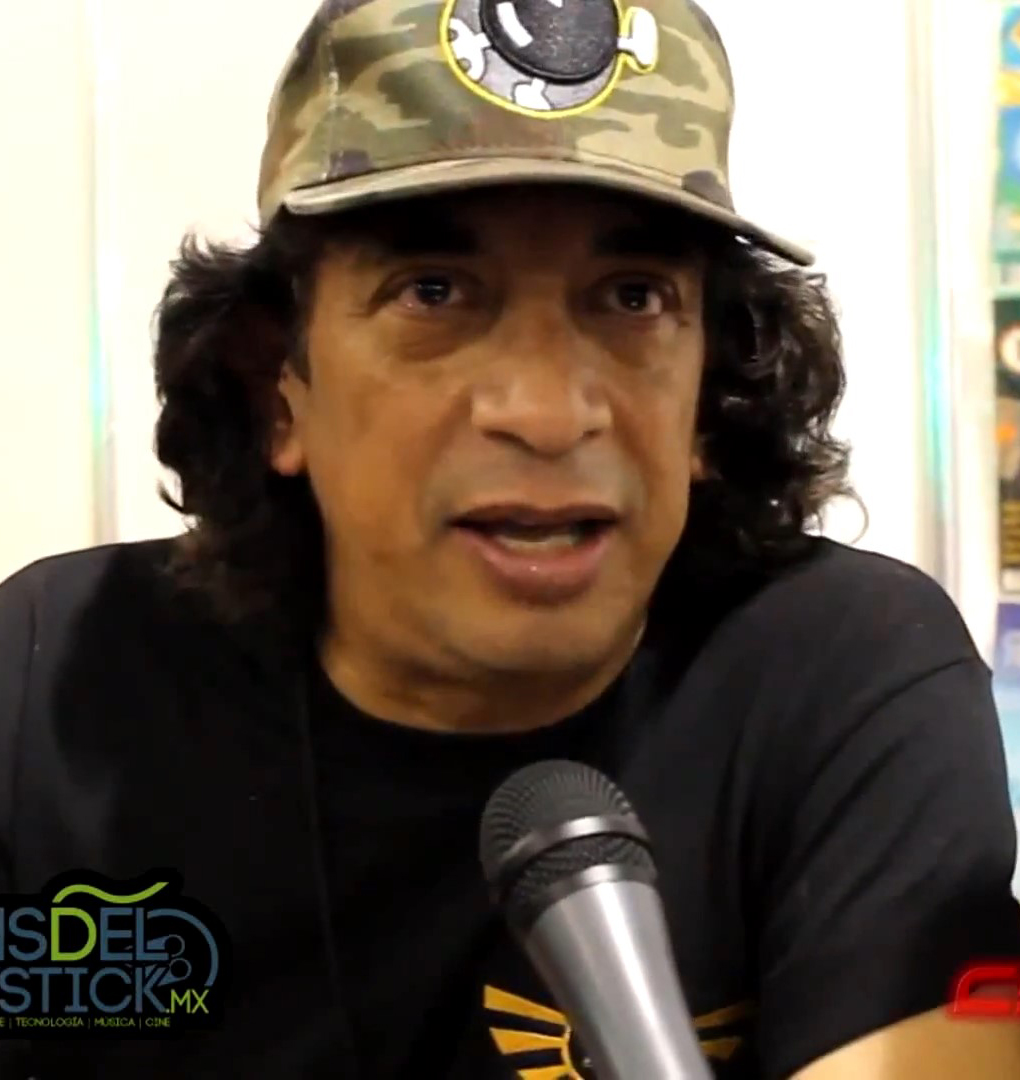
- Born: Gustavo Rodríguez; May 27, 1958; Mexico City
- Died: April 11, 2020 (aged 61); Mexico City
- Occupations: Screenwriter, television producer, video game journalist, voice actor
- Years active: 1977–2020
- Known for: Founding Club Nintendo magazine, screenwriting for Eugenio Derbez
- Children: Javier Rodríguez Ávila

Gustavo "Gus" Rodríguez (May 27, 1958 – April 11, 2020) was a Mexican screenwriter, television producer, video game journalist, and voice actor. He co-founded the video game magazine Club Nintendo in 1991 and the television program Nintendomanía (1995–2000), both of which became influential in Latin American gaming culture. Scholars have noted that Club Nintendo helped consolidate Nintendo’s success in Mexico during the 1990s and later circulated regionally with a standardized Latin American edition, reaching readers in Argentina, Chile, Colombia, Peru and beyond. As a screenwriter and comedian, he was known for his long-term collaboration with comedian Eugenio Derbez, contributing to television shows including Al Derecho y Al Derbez, XHDRbZ, and La familia P. Luche. He also worked as a voice actor for the Latin American Spanish dubbing of several films and video games. Rodríguez died on April 11, 2020, from complications related to mesothelioma.

== Early life and education ==
Gustavo Rodríguez was born on May 27, 1958, in Mexico City. According to Rodríguez, his interest in video games began in 1976 when he acquired a NESA PONG, a home version of Pong. He later purchased an Intellivision console and became interested in games such as Burgertime and Night Stalker, exchanging games with José Sierra, who would later become his business partner. In 1988, Rodríguez bought a Nintendo Entertainment System with Super Mario Bros., Duck Hunt, and The Legend of Zelda.

Rodríguez began studying advertising in 1977. After graduating, he co-founded the advertising agency Network Publicidad with José "Pepe" Sierra.

== Career ==
=== Advertising and early work ===
Network Publicidad served clients including the Mexican divisions of Berol and Casio, as well as the Mexican government agency Pronósticos para la Asistencia Pública, for which Rodríguez and Sierra developed the concept for Melate, a state-owned lottery.

One of the agency's clients was Mexican entrepreneur Jorge Nogami, who opened one of the first Nintendo retail stores in Mexico City in the late 1980s. Recognizing the specialized nature of the gaming market, Rodríguez and Sierra launched a brochure dedicated to Nintendo products and video games, distributed free of charge and issued initially on a weekly basis, later changing to biweekly.

=== Video game journalism ===
In December 1991, Rodríguez and Sierra launched Club Nintendo, a monthly video game magazine that evolved from their earlier brochure. The magazine published more than 200 issues before ceasing operations in February 2019. The publication is frequently cited as a primary driver of Nintendo’s popularity in Mexico during the 1990s and later became a regional magazine distributed across Latin America, standardizing content by 1999.

The concept was adapted into a television program, Nintendomanía, which aired from 1995 to 2000. Despite its popularity, the show was canceled due to rising production costs associated with the growth of internet-based gaming content.

Rodríguez continued hosting gaming-related television programs throughout his career. From 2014 to 2015, he hosted Power Up Gamers on FOROtv. In 2015, he began hosting Zero Control on TeleHit, which later moved to Televisa Deportes Network in 2016 as E-Sports de Zero Control, focusing on esports. In 2019, he joined Televisa Networks to host Retro Game and Game-Volution, both broadcast on BitMe.

=== Television writing and production ===
After Rodríguez and Sierra wrote a script for a live event, they were invited to collaborate with comedian Anabel Ferreira, through whom Rodríguez met Eugenio Derbez. In 1991, Rodríguez and Sierra began writing material for Derbez during his appearances on La Movida, a television series hosted by Verónica Castro. This marked the beginning of a long-term professional relationship, with Rodríguez and Sierra serving as head writers for Derbez's projects.

Rodríguez contributed scripts to several television shows starring or produced by Derbez, including Al Derecho y Al Derbez (1992–1995), Derbez en cuando (1998–1999), XHDRbZ (2002–2004), and La familia P. Luche (2007–2012). In XHDRBZ, he also appeared as an actor, playing the character Simón Paz in the segment "Las 5 herencias." According to Derbez, Rodríguez co-created several of Derbez's characters, including the emblematic "Armando Hoyos."

From 2005 to 2010, Rodríguez served as director of Vecinos, a sitcom produced by Derbez that was an adaptation of the Spanish series Aquí no hay quien viva. He also contributed to the humor segment of the newscast Primero Noticias (2004–2016), working alongside journalist Carlos Loret de Mola.

=== Voice acting and dubbing ===
Rodríguez worked on script adaptation and dubbing for Latin American Spanish versions of several films, including Wreck-It Ralph, Shrek 2, Ghostbusters, Pixels, and Night at the Museum: Battle of the Smithsonian. He also provided the voice for George Westinghouse in the video game Assassin's Creed Syndicate.

== Personal life ==
Rodríguez cited Chevy Chase and Leslie Nielsen as influences on his comedic style, particularly Nielsen's surreal humour in Airplane! and The Naked Gun. He was a fan of television series including The Big Bang Theory, which he appreciated for its character development and writing, and he made several trips to Japan, some related to his work as a gaming journalist. He also gave lectures, including one on creativity titled "Cómo nos surgen las ideas" (a Spanish pun that can be read as either "How ideas urge us" or "How ideas arise in us"). In later years he kept a personal collection of video games and memorabilia, portions of which he asked to be gifted to friends after his death.

== Death ==
Rodríguez was diagnosed with mesothelioma in October 2019 and underwent treatment that included the removal of one lung. He died on April 11, 2020, at age 61, after an allergic reaction to treatment worsened his condition.

Rodríguez left instructions for his family, including requests to scatter his ashes at a firefly sanctuary in Tlaxcala and to donate video games from his collection to friends. He also recorded a message for his fans asking them to perform acts of kindness, particularly for children in need. Following his death, his son Javier Rodríguez Ávila announced plans to maintain his father's social media accounts and that the family would auction some of Rodríguez's belongings to benefit a mesothelioma research foundation.

== Legacy ==
Academic work describes Rodríguez as an “icon” of video games in Latin America whose editorial voice in Club Nintendo helped shape regional fandom and consumer trends in the 1990s. Following his death, colleagues and institutions publicly paid tribute: actors and crew from La familia P. Luche and related programs shared remembrances of his mentorship and creativity, and Nintendo’s official account for Mexico expressed condolences to his family and fans. Media and events also honored him: Televisa dedicated an episode card in the sitcom Renta Congelada, where he had served as associate producer, and the inaugural Gaming Week Mexico scheduled a memorial talk about his career and influence in the region. In review pieces, columnists have described him as “the most notable promoter of video games” in Mexico.

== Selected works ==
Television (host)

- Nintendomanía (1995–2000) — Host/creator.
- Power Up Gamers (2014–2015), FOROtv — Host.
- Zero Control (2015), TeleHit; as E-Sports de Zero Control (2016), Televisa Deportes Network — Host.
- Retro Game (2019) and Game-Volution (2019), BitMe — Host.

Television (writer/producer/director)

- Al Derecho y Al Derbez (1992–1995) — Head writer.
- Derbez en cuando (1998–1999) — Writer.
- XHDRbZ (2002–2004) — Writer/performer (Simón Paz).
- La familia P. Luche (2007–2012) — Writer.
- Vecinos (2005–2010) — Director.

Dubbing and script adaptation (selected)

- Shrek 2 (2004) — adaptation (Latin American Spanish).
- Night at the Museum: Battle of the Smithsonian (2009) — adaptation.
- Wreck-It Ralph (2012) — adaptation.
- Pixels (2015) — adaptation.
- Ghostbusters (2016) — adaptation.
- Assassin’s Creed Syndicate (2015) — voice of George Westinghouse.

== See also ==
- Video gaming in Mexico
