= Carolina Ramírez =

Colombian actress

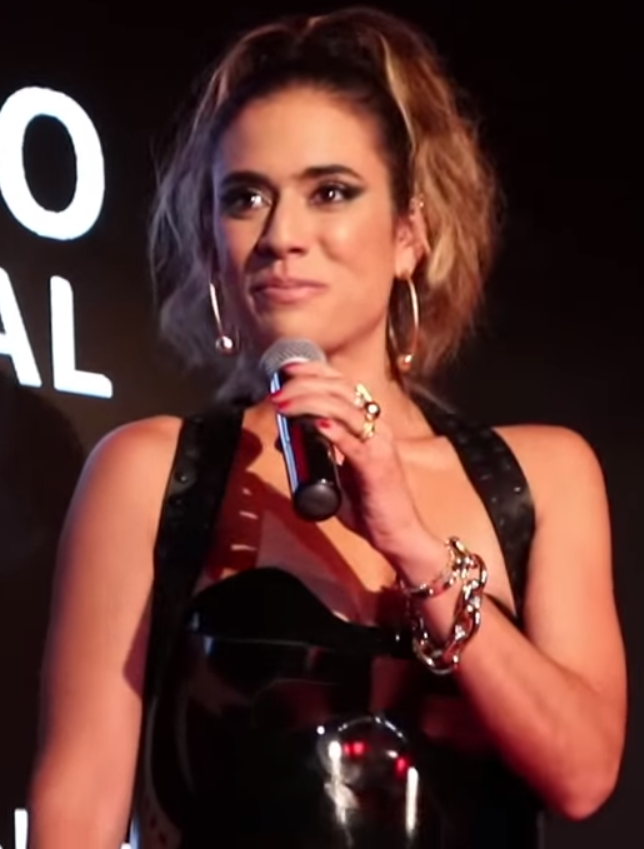
- Ramírez in 2019
- Occupation: Actress
- Years active: 2002–present
- Height: 1.68 m (5 ft 6 in)
- Spouse: Mariano Bacaleinik (m. 2010; div. 2024)
- Partner: Martin Cornide (2024–present)

Carolina Ramírez is a Colombian actress. She is best known for her roles in television as La hija del mariachi, and her portrayal of revolutionary Policarpa Salavarrieta in La Pola.

== Personal life ==
Carolina was born on June 20, 1983, in Cali, Colombia. She has been married since 2010 to Argentine businessman Mariano Bacaleinik.

== Filmography ==
Film roles
Year	Title	Role	Notes
2006	Soñar no cuesta nada	Herlinda	
2014	Ciudad Delirio	Angie	
2017	Cuando los hombres quedan solos	Unknown role	
2018	Wandering Girl	Carolina	

Television roles
Year	Title	Role	Notes
2002	Jack el despertador	Lila	
2002	La lectora	Remedios "Cherry" Carranza	
2004	La séptima puerta	Jenny Candela	Episode: "Largas despedidas"
2006	Decisiones	Sandra	Episode: "La sagrada familia"
2006–2007	La hija del mariachi	Rosario del Pilar Guerrero Santana	Main role; 147 episodes
2009	Las trampas del amor	Mariana Solano	Main role; 86 episodes
2010–2011	La Pola	Policarpa Salavarrieta	Main role; 182 episodes
2012	El Capo	Mariele	
2016	Contra el tiempo	Andrea Laverde	Main role; 100 episodes
2018–2021	La Reina del Flow	Yeimy Montoya	Main role; 172 episodes
2020	De brutas, nada	Hannah Larrea	Main role; 20 episodes
