= Alejandro Martínez (actor) =

Colombian actor and singer

- Born: December 22, 1966 (age 59); Bogotá, Colombia
- Occupations: Actor, singer
- Years active: 1988 – present

Alejandro Martínez (born December 22, 1966, in Bogotá, Colombia) is a Colombian actor and singer. As a child he had always shown an interest in acting and singing, and at the age of 12 he enrolled in the Conservatory of the National University where he learned to play several instruments. He graduated from university in 1985 with a degree in social communications, specializing in television production, but he had already started acting and singing while at university, forming a group called Café Stress before launching his solo career.

Martínez' acting breakthrough came with a lead role in the 1993 Colombian telenovela La maldición del paraiso, for which he was nominated in the Best Actor category in both the Símon Bolívar Television Awards and the TVyNovelas Awards Colombia, winning the former. He was nominated three more times for TVyNovelas Awards, for Eternamente Manuela (1996), Pobre Pablo (2001) and Escobar: El patron de mal (2013).

Martínez also briefly gained fame in 2008 in Hungary, when he appeared in a Hungarian reality television show following his then-girlfriend, former Playboy model Hargetai Bea. The program was criticized back in Colombia for only showing the worst aspects of Bogotá and Colombia.

As a singer Martínez has made three albums, Alejandro Martínez (1995), Mi Único Amor (1998) and Canción del Alma (2010).
