= Carlos Torres (actor) =

Colombian actor

- Torres in 2026
- Born: 20 September 1988 (age 38); Barranquilla, Colombia
- Occupation: Actor
- Years active: 2005–present
- Height: 1.83 m (6 ft 0 in)

Carlos Andres Torres Rivera (born 20 September 1988 in Barranquilla, Colombia) is a Colombian actor. The beginning of his debut on television in the Colombian drama series Padres e Hijos. His most notable roles in television have been in telenovelas such as Francisco el matemático: Clase 2017, The Queen of Flow, and All For Love.

== Career ==
Torres debuted on Colombian television in 2005 at age 17 in the long-running series, Padres e hijos. Subsequently, he played Franco Fritzenwalden in the Colombian version of the Argentine series, Floricienta. Before getting his first role as a main character in a telenovela, he participated as a recurring character in other telenovelas like Pocholo, and Cómplices.

In 2009 he got his first role as the main character in the telenovela, Amor mentiras y video. Between 2010 and 2012, he played the main villain of the series Niñas mal, a version of the Mexican film of the same name. In 2012 he obtained one of the main roles as a young protagonist in the telenovela, Pobres rico. In that same year he participated in Las Santísimas, a telenovela that was kept for five years, and which premiered in other countries first, although in Colombia it was broadcast between 2015 and 2016.

In 2013 he got a recurring role in the telenovela, Secretos del paraíso, a modern adaptation of La maldición del paraíso, whose premiere was first in Latin America, and the following year in Colombia.

In 2018 he emerged as a star in Latin America because of his role in La Reina del Flow.

== Personal life ==
His mother Carmen Rivera is an architect. He has an elder brother, Enrique, whose birthday is also the 20th of September.

== Filmography ==
Television roles
Year	Title	Roles	Notes
2005	Padres e hijos	Unknown role	
2007	Pocholo	Pablo Pérez	
2009	Amor mentiras y video	Tomás	
2010	Niñas Mal	Enrique "Kike" Linares	Recurring role (season 1); 25 episodes
2012	Pobres rico	Gustavo Rico	
2012	Las Santísimas	Joaquín	
2014	Secretos del paraíso	Julián Márquez	
2014–2015	Un sueño llamado salsa	Diego Armando Torres	
2015–2016	Sala de urgencias	Juan José Cardona	Main role (seasons 1–2); 111 episodes
2016	Azúcar	Santiago Solaz Vallecilla	Main role
2017	La ley del corazón	Mario Aristizábal	
2017	Francisco el matemático: Clase 2017	Francisco Quintana	Main role; 73 episodes
2018–2026	The Queen of Flow	Charly Flow	Main role; 172 episodes
2019	Bolívar	Francisco Quintana	Main role; 73 episodes
2020	All For Love	Joaquín Herrera	Main role; 63 episodes
2020	100 días para enamorarnos	Fabián "El Lobo" Ramírez	Recurring role (season 1); 12 episodes
2021	La nieta elegida	Juan Esteban Osorno	
2023	Welcome to Eden	Joel	Main role (season 2); 8 episodes
2024	Pedro el escamoso: más escamoso que nunca	Pedro Coral Jr.	Main role
2024	Sed de venganza	Gabriel del Pino	
2025	Medusa		
