= A Love to Last =

2017 Philippine television romantic drama series

- Title card
- Genre: Romance; Family drama; Comedy
- Created by: Henry King Quitain; Jay Fernando
- Written by: BJ Lingan; Rona Co; Carlota Balane
- Directed by: Jerry Lopez Sineneng; Frasco S. Mortiz; Richard I. Arellano; Rory B. Quintos
- Creative directors: Johnny Delos Reyes; Jay Fernando
- Starring: Bea Alonzo; Ian Veneracion; Iza Calzado
- Opening theme: "A Love to Last A Lifetime" by Juris
- Composer: Jose Mari Chan
- Country of origin: Philippines
- Original language: Filipino
- No. of seasons: 2
- No. of episodes: 183 (list of episodes)

Production
- Executive producers: Carlo Katigbak; Cory Vidanes; Laurenti Dyogi; Malou Santos
- Producers: Kristine P. Sioson; Ronald Faina; Myleen Ongkiko
- Production locations: Philippines; Germany
- Editors: Bernie Diasanta; Joshua Ducasen
- Running time: 33–50 minutes
- Production company: Star Creatives

Original release
- Network: ABS-CBN
- Release: January 9 – September 22, 2017

Related
- Be Careful with My Heart; Sana Dalawa ang Puso; Playhouse

A Love to Last is a 2017 Philippine television drama romantic family drama series broadcast by ABS-CBN. Directed by Jerry Lopez-Sineneng, Frasco S. Mortiz, Richard I. Arellano, and Rory B. Quintos, it stars Bea Alonzo, Ian Veneracion, and Iza Calzado. It aired on the network's Primetime Bida line up and worldwide on TFC from January 9 to September 22, 2017, replacing Magpahanggang Wakas and was replaced by The Good Son.

== Plot ==
The story revolves around relationships in a diversified family setting.

Two different people, Andeng (Bea Alonzo), and Anton (Ian Veneracion), that will prove if two broken hearts can make their love last or not.

== Cast and characters ==
=== Main cast ===
- Bea Alonzo as Andrea "Andeng" Agoncillo-Noble, Anton's second wife and stepmother of Chloe, Lucas, and Kitty. She is about 18 years younger than Anton, but is mature beyond her years. Despite the age difference, she falls in love and marries Anton. She embraces her role as stepmother of three children and supportive wife of a successful and ambitious man, whose first marriage failed because of his ambition. A career woman herself, she successfully balances her priorities, and brings much happiness into Anton's life and his family's. Her biggest challenge is Grace, her husband's ex-wife, who is obsessed and determined to destroy their marriage, pushing Andrea's fears of infidelity and insecurities about her place in Anton's heart. This causes friction in their marriage. At some point, she almost gives up. But a chance conversation with an ex-fiancé opens her eyes to the important piece she was giving up, and that was the family she built with her husband and his children.
- Ian Veneracion as Antonio "Anton" Noble IV. Devastated after Grace leaves him and their children, he picks up the pieces of his family's broken hearts. To fill the vacuum left by Grace's departure, he becomes a hands on Dad, restacks his priorities, and places his career and business second to his children's needs. Because of Anton's nurturing, the children adjust to a happy single parent household. After their annulment, he becomes the country's most eligible bachelor, but no one captures his heart except Andrea. Despite various challenges from their individual families, their relationship prevails and is finally accepted by everyone, except Grace Silverio, his haughty, self-serving, self-centered ex-wife. Anton is determined to protect his second marriage from Grace's manipulations and obsession to reclaim him. He's a kind hearted man, who finds it difficult to put his ex in her place, although he tries to many times. Despite all, Grace's manipulative tactic wears down Andrea, succeeding in breaking up the marriage, but he never gives up. Just when he and his children were taking off on their private plane to HK to fulfill a long promised vacation with his children, Andrea returns. They happily reconcile and the series ends with Andrea giving him the news of her pending pregnancy.
- Iza Calzado as Grace Silverio, Anton's ex-wife and mother of Chloe, Lucas, and Kitty who she abandoned three years ago. Grace is a confident heiress who feels she needs to be free from the domineering and controlling personality of her husband. In reality, she has someone in LA. Despite Anton's pleas to return to Manila, and the risk of losing custody of her children, she insists on an annulment. She leaves behind a 15 year old, 13 year old and a 5 year old. Three years later, after two failed relationships, Grace decides to return home to reclaim her husband and children. She realizes that she is still in love with him and tries everything to drive a wedge between Anton and Andrea and her children, in the hope that she can win him back. Her obsession becomes a major concern for her children. Her last ditched effort to win Anton by confessing that she loves and wants him back fails. Anton rejects her, but she steals a passionate kiss which is unfortunately witnessed by Andrea. Anton's rejection, and Chloe's reprimand accusing her of destroying their family a second time, drives her to commit suicide. She survives and returns to the US to heal. Anton promises her that the children would spend summers with her.

=== Supporting/Extended/Guest cast ===
- Julia Barretto as Chloe S. Noble. Anton and Grace's eldest child who fills the role of "mother-figure" to her siblings when Grace leaves them. She is in a relationship with Fort, but actually likes Tupe. She eventually chooses Tupe, but Fort remains her best friend. Chloe's priority is to ensure her family remains intact and her father's happiness is more important than her own mother's. She is happy about Andrea's relationship with her father, and she is instrumental in Lucas' change of heart for Andrea. She struggles with her father's disciplinary actions regarding her relationship with Tupe. Andrea successfully bridges this challenge. Chloe also sees through her mother's antics towards Andrea. She asks her mother to back off. Grace's obsession remains a big concern for the children, and Chloe has taken it upon herself to communicate their dismay to their mother. They love and respect their mother, but they are very clear they value the importance of Andrea in their lives. They love their stepmother very much and want to make sure their mother does not destroy the family they had built with her.
- Ronnie Alonte as Christopher "Tupe" Dimayuga. Chloe's boyfriend. He is a brilliant scholar, who interned at Anton's company, and earned the respect of his colleagues and teachers. Unfortunately, his lack of maturity to handle first love and its responsibilities, has driven him into situations that made him lose his scholarship and employment. Chloe loves him deeply, tries hard to understand him, and struggles to preserve their relationship, even if she was forbidden by her father to embark into a boyfriend relationship with him. Unfortunately, their disobedience has caused various conflicts and heartaches for both. As Tupe drives the relationship towards a downward spiral because of his immature decisions, Chloe is understanding now what it takes to keep a relationship. She is opening her eyes to the large maturity gap that exists in her relationship with Tupe. After seeing the experience of her mom and dads failed marriage, and the separation of her dad and step mom, she broke up with Tupe.
- Enchong Dee as Andrew Agoncillo, Andrea's para-triathlete half-brother who tries his best to fit in with Andrea's family. He works in Andrea's event management firm, and falls in love with their client, Bianca Silverio, Grace's niece and gets her pregnant. Despite the insults and objections hurled at Andrew by the wealthy Silverios, the young couple are determined to prove their love. Andrew and Bianca have the full emotional support from his family. Their marriage thrives and they have a young boy.
- JK Labajo as Lucas Noble. Anton and Grace's only son who disliked Andrea in the beginning and dreamt of making his family complete again. He learns to respect and love Andrea, who made sure she and Anton would not get married until Lucas accepted their relationship. He is the child who was most sensitive to Andrea's feelings during the first months of their marriage, particularly when Grace tried to ruin it in many ways possible. He loved his mother but understood that Andrea completed his father's happiness. He wanted his mother to move on. He was also very disappointed and disillusioned with Grace after he learned she had a boyfriend after his parents' separation. He remained Andrea's strong supporter to the end.
- Hannah Lopez Vito as Katherine "Kitty" S. Noble. Anton and Grace's youngest child who is supportive of her father's relationship with Andrea. She genuinely loved Andrea as she would love her own mother. She showed this when she used a family portrait with Andrea as her "treasure" at a family camp activity. Kitty also loves her mother, but she has accepted that her mother left her once, for reasons she can't fully understand, and could very well leave her again. She is very much affected by Andrea and Anton's quarrels caused by her mother's obsession. She asked her siblings to help her do something to fix it. She is terrified that Andrea would leave their home like their real mother did.
- Tirso Cruz III as Antonio "Tony" Noble III, Anton's father who became a renowned scientist from poor roots. He had little faith in his son's decisions and initially did not support Anton's relationship with Andrea. He changed his mind after Andrea won him over, and he saw how happy his son was.
- Irma Adlawan as Virginia "Baby" Custodio-Agoncillo, Andrea's mother and Andrew's stepmother who is supportive in all of Andrea's decisions, especially with Anton. She dispenses very good advice to Andrea, always bringing her out of sadness when dealing with her marriage problems.
- Perla Bautista as Carla "Mameng" Agoncillo, Andrea's grandmother and the matriarch of the Agoncillo family. In the beginning, she did not approve of Andrea's relationship with Anton, until he proved her wrong. Despite her initial misgivings and ongoing concerns over her granddaughter's issues in her marriage, she remains supportive of Andrea and Anton. She is equally supportive of Andrew and Bianca, despite their situation.
- Bernard Palanca as Tom Gonzales, Anton's best friend who secretly likes Andrea's best friend, Tracy. He is supportive to Anton's relationship with Andrea. He is ready to ask Tracy to marry him.
- Matet de Leon as Tracy Buenaventura, Andrea's best friend who likes Anton's best friend, Tom. She was with Andrea in Germany when they went to the CELBA conference. She is a bit too much in her support of Andrea, too nosy, but she means well.
- Jameson Blake as Andres Bonifacio "Fort" Gonzales. Chloe's childhood best friend who pretends to be her boyfriend to help Chloe get the attention of Tupe. His parents suffer from a broken marriage and he relies on Chloe to be the person to talk to. He is in love with Chloe. He is much more mature than Tupe.
- Melanie Marquez as Miriam "Mimi" Stuart, Andrea's business partner in Good Events.
- Arlene Muhlach as Noemi Agoncillo, Andrea's aunt (her late father's sister) who was against Andrea and Anton's relationship in their early stages of courtship.
- Anna Marin as Cecilia Hernandez-Noble, Anton's loving mother and the grandmother to Chloe, Lucas, and Kitty. Unlike Tony, she fully trusts and supports Anton's relationship with Andrea. She's never seen Anton so happy.
- Jenine Desiderio as Bettina "Betty" Agoncillo, Andrea's aunt (her late father's sister) who was the godmother at her wedding.
- Denise Joaquin as Maggie Agoncillo, Andrea's cousin.
- Claire Ruiz as Gena, Tupe's ex-girlfriend who is jealous of Chloe, and a trouble maker.
- Pamu Pamorada as Maxine, Andrea's friend who works with her in Good Events.
- Prince Stefan as Oscar, Andrea's friend who works with her in Good Events.
- Sam Thurman as Marcus, Andrea's friend who works with her in good events.
- Kazel Kinouchi as Bianca Silverio, Grace's niece who is living with her due to business reasons. She falls in love with Andrew and ends up pregnant.
- Patricia Ysmael as Astrid, Anton's loyal secretary.
- Troy Montero as Michael, Grace's ex-boyfriend who is persistent in getting back together with her. He is whom the family is suspecting the reason why Grace left them. He confronted Lucas, introducing himself as Grace's boyfriend.
- Carla Martinez as Dianne Silverio, Grace's mother and the maternal grandmother to Chloe, Lucas, and Kitty. She returns to the Philippines and helps Grace in her battle with Andrea and Anton because she thought Grace wanted to get her children back. When she realized her daughter's real agenda, she tries to put a stop to Grace's plans.
- Lilet as Amina Gonzales, Fort's mother who strives to keep her family together despite her husband's persistent affairs. She forgave her husband when he returned.
- Michael Flores as Marlon Gonzales, Fort's father who left them for his mistress. He realized his error and returned to his original family,
- Cris Villanueva as Paul Silverio, Bianca's father who disapproves her daughter's relationship with Andrew. He is Grace's brother and equally selfish and greedy.
- Lui Manansala as Yaya Diding, a long time retainer of the Silverio who served as nanny and major doma in Anton's house who keeps Grace updated with news on Anton and Andrea's relationship. She hates Andrea for Anton and thinks that she is only after his money. She tries to undermine Andrea until she overstepped her boundaries and was fired by Anton. She ended up returning to Grace.
- Kim Molina as Anjanette, Andrea's friend who is directing Lucas's music video launch.
- Minnie Aguilar as Lota
- Kyra Custodio as Lucy
- Ethyl Osorio as Francia
- Trina "Hopia" Legaspi as Kath, Chloe's friend.
- Josh Ivan Morales as Berto
- Miguel Diokno as Santino Agoncillo, Andrea's nephew who is scared that Kitty might replace him as her baby.
- Lance Lucido as Marty
- Aaliyah Belmoro
- Makisig Morales as Donald
- Eric Nicolas as Gaston Dimayuga
- Marc Santiago as Donald Dimayuga
- Via Veloso as Susan
- Richard Manabat as Boyet Agoncillo
- Dwight Gaston as Jordan
- Via Carillo as Morgana Agoncillo
- Uajo Manarang as Vincent Agoncillo
- Jade Ecleo as Catherine Agoncillo
- Marianne Guidiotti as Karen Noble
- Erika Padilla as Melissa
- Riva Quenery as Coleen
- Luke Jickain as Mr. Salcedo
- Krystal Mejes as Crystal
- Scott Tibayan as Fred
- Isabel Granada as Cris

=== Special participation ===
- Xian Lim as Sebastian "Totoy" Cruz, Andrea's childhood friend who is in love with her. He later gives way to Andrea and Anton's love knowing that it would make Andrea happy, and he went abroad as a seaman.
- Daniel Matsunaga as Patrick Buendia, Andrea's client, who appears to be interested in Andrea.
- Andrea Brillantes as young Andrea, the daughter of Baby and Reynaldo who believes that she does not need her father because he left them.
- Pilar Pilapil as Victoria Madrigal, a client of Andrea's company, Good Events, who introduced her to Anton.
- Victor Silayan as Jerold Francisco, Andrea's former fiancé who she caught cheating on her with another woman.
- TJ Trinidad as Ben Avelino
- Toby Alejar as Reynaldo Agoncillo, Andrea and Andrew's father as well as Baby's husband. He had an affair with another woman and abandoned his first family, only to return after he suffered a stroke and his mistress refused to care for him.
- Bobby Andrews as Bobby Andrews, a fellow business associate of Anton.
- Bea Rose Santiago as Herself
- Wency Cornejo as Himself

== Reception ==
Kantar Media National TV Ratings (8:45PM / 8:30 PM / 9:30PM / 9:15PM PST)
Pilot Episode	Finale Episode	Peak	Average
25.0% January 9, 2017 (8:45PM PST)	25.0% September 22, 2017 (9:30PM PST)	27.8%, 25.0% January 12, 2017 (8:45PM PST), September 22, 2017 (9:30PM PST)	TBD

== Production ==
=== Title change ===
The initial title for the series was The Second Wife. However, the Wife titles became redundant, and thus the title was later renamed by the management as A Love to Last.

=== Timeslot change ===
On January 23, 2017, A Love to Last was moved to a later timeslot at 9:30pm after the 2016 series of Till I Met You ended to give way for My Dear Heart.

== International broadcast ==
Country	Network	Title	Date
Kenya	KTN	A Love to Last	May 16, 2019
Peru	Panamericana	Un Amor Duradero	2022

Aired Internationally via Netflix

== Remake and adaptations ==
A Mexican remake titled Te esperaba is currently produced by TelevisaUnivision and is scheduled to premiere in February 1, 2027 on Las Estrellas. The series stars Valentina Buzzurro in her first lead role as Sofía Canseco alongside David Chocarro as Antonio Reyes.

== See also ==
- List of programs broadcast by ABS-CBN
- List of ABS-CBN Studios original drama series
