= Angélica Celaya =

American actress

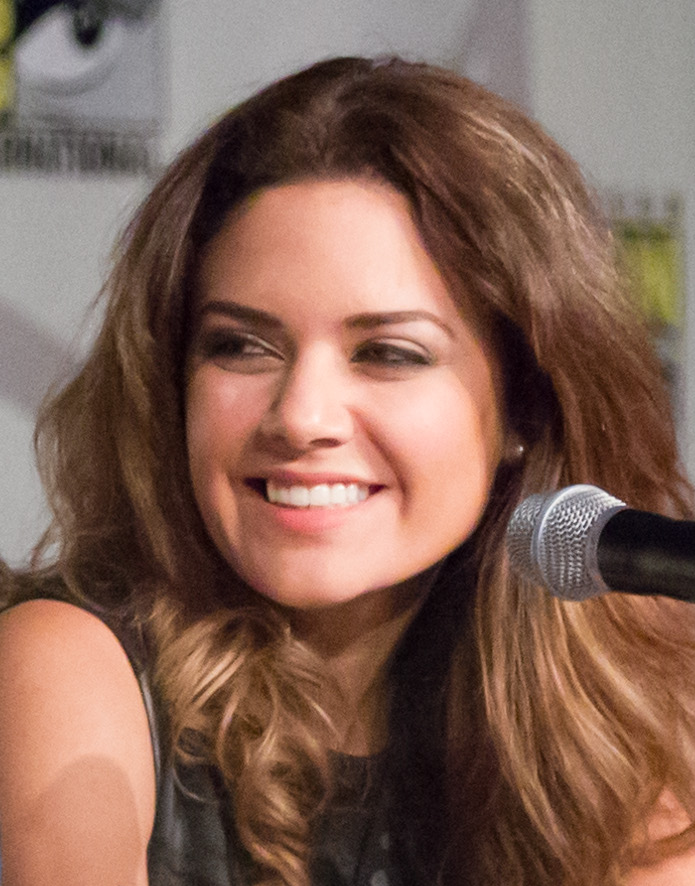
- Celaya at the 2014 Comic Con presentation for Constantine
- Born: Angélica Guadalupe Celaya; July 9, 1982 (age 44); Tucson, Arizona, U.S.
- Occupations: Actress, model
- Years active: 2003–present
- Spouse: Luís García (m. 2018)
- Partner: Rafael Amaya (2010-2015)
- Children: 1

Angélica Guadalupe Celaya (born July 9, 1982) is an American actress and model. She is best known for her role in television dramas. She is also known for playing Jenni Rivera in the show Mariposa de Barrio.

== Early life and career ==
Celaya was born on July 9, 1982, in Tucson, Arizona, to Mexican parents. She attended Pueblo High School. Her acting debut was in the 2003 telenovela Ladrón de corazones. She also played roles in telenovelas including Los plateados, Marina, Mientras haya vida and Vivir sin ti.

Celaya was selected as the female lead "Zed" in the supernatural drama Constantine alongside Matt Ryan. The character of Zed was added to the show after the show-runners decided not to use the female lead from the pilot. Although the show was cancelled after only one season, Celaya's portrayal of the young psychic plagued by visions was generally well received by fans.

Since the cancellation of Constantine, Celaya has gone on to have guest appearances on multiple shows, including Castle and Criminal Minds: Beyond Borders, as well as a central role in the 2018 film Danger One.

== Personal life ==
In 2010, while shooting the telenovela Alguien te mira, she met Rafael Amaya, with whom she started a relationship. They were engaged, but as of May 2015, Amaya confirmed their breakup. She has a son, Angel Alessandro (b. September 8, 2017) with Mexican boxer Luis García whom she married on September 8, 2018.

== Filmography ==
=== Films ===
Year	Title	Role	Notes
2010	Dead West	Gloria Valenzuela	
2010	Más sabe el diablo: El primer golpe	René Cardona	Direct-to-DVD; prequel to novela
2014	Kiss of Vengeance	The Lady	Short film
2018	Danger One	Brie	
2018	Skin in the Game	Eve	

=== Television ===
Year	Title	Role	Notes
2003	Ladrón de corazones	Renata	
2005	Los Plateados	Ximena Campuzano	
2006	Decisiones	Lucy	Episode: "Bajo otra piel"
2006	Marina	Rosalba Álvarez	
2008	Mientras haya vida	Paula Hernández	
2008	Vivir por ti	Liliana	
2008	Gabriel	Eva León	10 episodes
2010	Perro Amor	Miranda	
2010	Edgar Floats	Penny	Television film
2010–11	Alguien te mira	Eva Zanetti	75 episodes
2012	Burn Notice	Angela Flores	Episode: "Official Business"
2013	El Señor de los Cielos	Eugenia Casas	56 episodes
2014	Dallas	Lucia Treviño	3 episodes
2014–15	Constantine	Mary "Zed" Martin	Main role
2014	The Late Late Show with Craig Ferguson	Herself	Episode: "Justin Long/Angelica Celaya"
2015	Agent X	Luna	Episode: "The Devil & John Case"
2016	The Death of Eva Sofia Valdez	Dominique	Television film
2016	Criminal Minds: Beyond Borders	Chief Inspector Silvia Ruiz	Episode: "De Los Inocentes"
2016	Castle	Sonia Ruiz	Episode: "Heartbreaker"
2017	Mariposa de Barrio	Jenni Rivera	Main role, 69 episodes
2023	True Lies	Ximena Díaz	Episode: "Public Secrets"
2024	La isla: desafío extremo	Herself	Contestant
2024	La mujer de mi vida	Daniela	Main role
2025–26	Top Chef VIP	Herself	Contestant (season 4) Guest (season 5)
2026	Lobo, morir matando	Miranda Villanueva	Main role

== Awards and nominations ==
Year	Award	Category	Nominated works	Result
2013	Premios Tu Mundo	Best Supporting Actress	El Señor de los Cielos	Nominated
