= Friend a Soldier =

Israeli NGO promoting dialogue between former IDF soldiers and the Arab world

- Formation: 2010; 16 years ago
- Founder: Daniel Nisman, Joshua Mintz, Yagil Beinglass
- Type: Non-Governmental Organization
- Headquarters: Israel
- Methods: Email system, video replies, live chat

Friend a Soldier (FaS) is an Israeli Non-Governmental Organization (NGO) established by Israel Defense Forces (IDF) veterans to promote dialogue between former IDF soldiers and the Arab world.

== History ==
Friend a Soldier was founded in 2010 by IDF Special Forces veteran Daniel Nisman and IDF infantry veterans Joshua Mintz and Yagil Beinglass following their experiences debating and discussing the Israeli Palestinian conflict online in chat rooms and forums. According to Beinglass, the three were “disillusioned with the existing forums that have been created for soldiers to express their opinions and experiences in the IDF” and, according to Nisman, “wanted to create a forum that would allow soldiers to speak candidly about their experiences on the one hand, while giving people throughout the world the opportunity to ask whatever they want in a safe, non-politically driven setting.”

== Mission and Methods Used ==
According to their mission statement, Friend a Soldier’s primary function is “to share with the world their experiences taking part in the Middle East conflict and living in Israel. It is their belief that forging personal connections is the only way to gain a better understanding of the complex reality of the conflict and, ultimately, the only way to achieve a lasting peace.”

Friend a Soldier uses three methods to achieve this:

1) Friend a Soldier’s primary method of dialogue is through their website’s email system. Participants are invited to ‘choose a soldier’ and email them through the site about any topic they choose. Participants then receive a personal reply directly to their email inbox.

2) Friend a Soldier volunteers also reply to popular topics in videos made by the organization. The videos have covered topics ranging from the 2005 Gaza Disengagement to the role of women in the IDF.

3) In November 2011, Friend a Soldier added a live chat function to their website, encouraging participants to engage in live discussions with IDF veterans online. The inaugural live chat was a discussion about Palestinian Reconciliation and the Arab Spring.

== Criticism and Response ==
Writing for Ma'an News Agency in March 2011 (before the live chat function was added to the FaS website), Charlotte Alfred expressed reservations about the project, questioning whether the format was conducive to two way communication or just a case of “talking at people.”

Friend a Soldier has also been accused of being a government / government funded organization, but takes care to stress that they are not affiliated with any government agency whatsoever.
