= Cynthia Olavarría =

Puerto Rican actress, television host, and fashion model (born 1982)

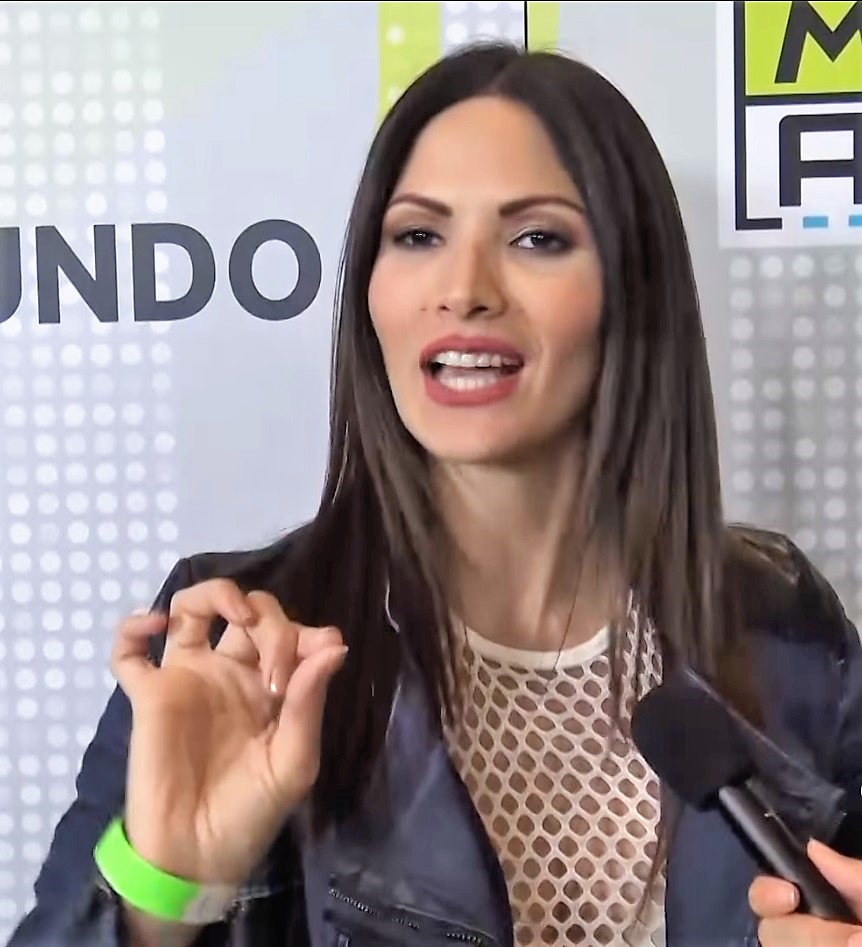
- Born: Cynthia Enid Olavarría Rivera; January 28, 1982 (age 44); Santurce, San Juan, Puerto Rico
- Education: University of Puerto Rico, Río Piedras Campus (BA)
- Occupation: Actress
- Height: 5 ft 9 in (1.75 m)
- Beauty pageant titleholder
- Title: Miss San Juan Universe 2003; Miss Salinas Universe 2005; Miss Puerto Rico Universe 2005
- Hair color: Brown
- Eye color: Brown
- Major competitions: Miss Puerto Rico Universe 2003 (1st Runner-Up); Miss Puerto Rico Universe 2005 (Winner); Miss Universe 2005 (1st Runner-Up)
- Website: http://www.cynthiaolavarria.com/

Cynthia Enid Olavarría Rivera (born January 28, 1982 in Santurce) is a Puerto Rican actress, fashion model, TV host and beauty pageant titleholder who won Miss Puerto Rico Universe 2005 and placed 1st Runner-Up at Miss Universe 2005.

== Biography ==
=== Early years ===
Born in the Santurce district of San Juan, Puerto Rico, Olavarría was an expressive and eloquent child. Those qualities made her embark in the world of beauty pageants, TV hosting and modeling since she was a teenager. At age 11, she won her first beauty pageant, "Miss Reina Infantil" and became the host of the famous Puerto Rican child game show Contra el Reloj con Pacheco ("Against the Clock with Pacheco").

=== Studies ===
Cynthia Olavarria attended Colegio La Piedad, a private school in Isla Verde, Puerto Rico, where she was an honors student and member of many school organizations, including the National Honor Society and the Student Council. After graduating High School, she enrolled in the University of Puerto Rico, Río Piedras Campus, where she managed to combine her studies with her modeling career. She graduated Magna Cum Laude in 2004 with a Bachelor's degree in Mass Communications, with a concentration in Journalism and Public Relations.

=== Modeling career ===
At age 18, she started out as a model by competing in Elite Model Look Puerto Rico's Competition, where she placed third. This served as a springboard to develop a long modeling career where she has enjoyed success, achieving over 20 magazine covers and publications in Indonesia, the Dominican Republic, Miami, New York, and Puerto Rico.

Many awards have been given to her for her trajectory, including two awards for "Best Female Model" and a recognition as a Puerto Rican "Top Model". She also received the "International Model Ambassador Award" at the Chicago Latino Fashion Week in 2007, and another recognition as "Outstanding Model of the Year" in the Latin Pride National Awards.

=== Beauty pageants ===
Olavarria's history with pageants started at age 11, when she won her first beauty pageant, "Miss Reina Infantil". When she became 18, she competed in Elite Model Look Puerto Rico.

After graduating from college, Olavarría was headed towards a Master's degree in Entertainment Law as well as a career with Elite Model Management when she decided to temporarily change her path and participated in the Miss Puerto Rico Universe 2005 pageant, where she won the crown representing the municipality of Salinas in October 2004.

She represented Puerto Rico in Miss Universe 2005 pageant held in Bangkok, Thailand on May 31, 2005. Olavarría became the first Puerto Rican in the Miss Universe history to place 1st Runner-Up. One of her 1st Runner-Up duties included attending to the crowning ceremony of Miss Indonesia 2006 pageant, on behalf of the Miss Universe Organization.

During the course of her reign, she made many appearances on such television programs such as Don Francisco Presenta, El Gordo y La Flaca, Despierta America, Cotorreando, Primer Impacto, Objetivo Fama, Premios Juventud, and Premios Lo Nuestro.

Given her success in beauty pageants she has been invited to be a judge in several international beauty pageants, along with hosting some of them. Including to host "Miss Universe Puerto Rico 2018 and 2019 pageants for WAPA-TV and WAPA America.

=== Acting career ===
After finishing her undergraduate studies and returning from Miss Universe, Olavarria began taking acting lessons with actresses Elia Enid Cadilla, Flor Nunez, Sebastian Ligarde and Hector Zavaleta, in order to become an actress. Her television debut was as the protagonist of a mini-series called Cuando el Universo Conspira in 2005. Later she made her theater debut by playing a major role as a princess in the child-oriented play La Princesa de los Ojos Tristes. In 2006, she appeared in Victor Manuelle and Sin Bandera’s musical video entitled Maldita Suerte. In 2007, she landed the protagonist role in the first-ever online telenovela for the Hispanic market, Mi Adorada Malena, which was produced by Univision and broadcast on its website. Due to its success, it was later broadcast nationally on the network.

In July 2010, she landed the role of Lucy Saldana in Telemundo's telenovela-thriller Alguien Te Mira. She plays a crazy massage therapist that is obsessed with one of her coworkers, and will stop at nothing to destroy his marriage so she can have him. In December 2010, she also played the main role in the music video of Jencarlos Canela's new single, titled Mi Corazon Insiste.

In 2011 she signed a contract with Telemundo Studios and became an Exclusive talent for the Network. In April 2011, she filmed "Mi Corazón Insiste" My Heart Beats For Lola Volcán as "Sofia Palacios, and in 2012-2013 was part of the telenovela El Rostro De la Venganza as Diana Mercader.

In August 2013 Cynthia won the "Best Supporting Actress Award" in "Premios Tu Mundo" for her role as the good natured Diana Mercader in the telenovela-thriller El Rostro De La Venganza.

As much as Cynthia enjoyed winning a "Tu Mundo" for interpreting angelic/good natured roles she also feared the award might typecast her indefinitely in such characters. However, early in November 2014 People en Español magazine announced that Telemundo Studios had cast Cynthia in a stellar villainess role in Tierra De Reyes, a remake of the highly popular Colombian telenovela "Pasion De Gavilanes". This time she would be interpreting the diabolical, Isadora Valverde, a dangerous and obsessive woman who runs a drug cartel and who obsesses in a love triangle between actors Fabian Rios and Aaron Diaz.

In 2015, she won the "Best Villain Award" for that role.

In 2016 she moved to the Dominican Republic to film "Loki 7" as Kandy Canovas and later that year made a special appearance in the movie "Juan Apóstol, El Más Amado", filmed in Almeria, Spain.

In 2021-2022 she filmed "La Mujer De Mi Vida" in Telemundo Global Studios Miami.

==== Television ====
Her hosting career started at an early age when she became the host of Contra el Reloj con Pacheco.

In the United States, she has been a presenter at Premios Juventud, Premios Lo Nuestro, Latin Billboard Music Awards, and the Mexican Billboard Awards. She has also served as guest host in Día a Día, Escandalo TV, Acceso Total, and Nuestra Belleza Latina.

In 2007, Univision recruited her to become the official Runway Coach of the hit reality show Nuestra Belleza Latina which airs on the Univision network. There she held an active role in this position for three years total (2007–2010) while also doing work for other Univision sister networks. In February 2010 she moved on to work for Galavision UniMás, as a news correspondent and co-host of Acceso Maximo.

Cynthia also worked for Univision's rival network Telemundo as the host of Decisiones Puerto Rico, the Puerto Rican adaptation of the Telemundo's series Decisiones. In 2008, she also hosted a Miss Universe special titled “Intimamente con Miss Universo” for Telemundo. The one-hour show follows the steps of Miss Universe 2008, after winning the title.

In 2007 and 2008, she joined Mexican singer and actor Fernando Allende to host the Miss World Puerto Rico pageant.

She was also the temporary host of Telemundo's Acceso Total in November 2010 while she filmed the telenovela Alguien Te Mira. She also starred Mi Corazón Insiste… en Lola Volcán with Carmen Villalobos, Jencarlos Canela, Carlos Ferro, and Ana Layevska where she plays Sofia Palacios.

In 2011 she hosted "Camino a la Corona" the Miss Universe Gala Pre Show in Brazil.

In 2012 she participated in Telemundo's El Rostro de la Venganza, with Elizabeth Gutiérrez, David Chocarro, Maritza Rodríguez and Saúl Lisazo; for which she won "Mejor Actriz de Reparto" (Best Supporting Actress) at Premios Tu Mundo.

In 2013 she became the official host of A & E Network for an exclusive coverage of "Festival Viña Del Mar" in Chile. Olavarria had one on one interviews with Ricky Martin, Jesse & Joy, Melendi and Carlos Vives.

Early in 2013 it was announced that Cynthia will be starring in Top Chef Estrellas, a Latin American version of the reality cooking television show Top Chef that will air Telemundo with stars competing for their choice of charity.

From 2016-2018 Olavarria moved to LA, to work on a Reality Show, empowering woman to become the best version of themselves. It aired on Azteca America.

In 2019 she joined ABC Puerto Rico to host "Primetime", a variety and entertainment daily show. In 2020 she was the Fashion Reporter for ABC Puerto Rico's Oscars Ceremony.

In 2021 she was invited by Telemundo Network to be a part of "Las Nuestras", a TV show to discuss several topics related beauty pageants, alongside Lupita Jones, Dayanara Torres, Estefanía Fernández, journalist Luis Alfonso Borrego Univision and actress Aylin Mujica Telemundo.

== Present ==
Her life flashed before her eyes the summer of 2018 after a snake bite in the middle of a photo shoot in Miami. “They told me the venom wouldn’t leave my body within 12 months… I thought it will leave sooner but it was worse with the months” said sobbing Miss Universe Puerto Rico 2005. Doctors had told her “you probably won't be the same person, you will have to use a machine in your leg, so you can be able to walk.

Cynthia is active on Social Media, and is known as a beauty, fashion, and lifestyle Influencer. She's also a Social Media Manager, Pageant Consultant, and Runway Coach, on her successful online platform: "Proyecto Missma".

== Filmography ==
Television and films performance
| Year | Title | Roles | Notes |
|---|---|---|---|
| 2005 | Miss Universe 2005 | Herself | Competition program; Miss Puerto Rico (1st Runner-Up) |
| 2005 | Don Francisco Presenta | Herself | TV show; guest role |
| 2007–2009 | Nuestra Belleza Latina | Herself | Guest Judge; 22 episodes |
| 2007 | Mi adorada Malena | Malena | TV series; main role, 6 episodes |
| 2010–2011 | Alguien te mira | Lucia "Lucy" Saldaña | TV series; series regular, 88 episodes |
| 2011 | Mi corazón insiste en Lola Volcán | Sofía Palacios | TV series; series regular, 111 episodes |
| 2012–2013 | El rostro de la venganza | Diana Mercader | TV series; series regular |
| 2014 | Secreteando | Silvia | TV series; episode: "Hace tiempo que debí contártelo" |
| 2014–2015 | Tierra de reyes | Isadora Valverde | TV series; series regular, 114 episodes |
| 2016 | Loki 7 | Candy | Film |
| 2016 | Juan Apóstol, El Más Amado | Eva | Guest Appearance |
| 2021-2022 | La Mujer de mi Vida | Annette | TV series; guest appearance, 30 episodes |

== Awards and nominations ==
| Year | Award | Category | Nominated works | Result |
|---|---|---|---|---|
| 2013 | Premios Tu Mundo | Best Supporting Actress | El Rostro de la Venganza | Won |
| 2015 | Premios Tu Mundo | The Best Bad Girl - Novela | Tierra de reyes | Won |

== See also ==
- List of Puerto Ricans

Awards and achievements
| Preceded by (United States) Shandi Finnessey | Miss Universe 1st Runner-Up; 2005 | Succeeded by (Japan) Kurara Chibana |
| Preceded by Alba Reyes | Miss Puerto Rico Universe; 2005 | Succeeded by Zuleyka Rivera |
| Preceded by - | Miss Salinas Universe; 2005 | Succeeded by Zuleyka Rivera |
| Preceded by - | Miss San Juan Universe; 2003 | Succeeded by Antoinette Castrillo |
