= Alguien te mira (American TV series) =

- Genre: Telenovela
- Created by: Perla Farías
- Based on: Alguien te mira by Pablo Illanes
- Written by: Eduardo Macías; Rossana Negrín; Cristina Policastro; José Vicente Spataro; Roberto Stopello
- Directed by: Leonardo Galavis; Luis Manzo
- Starring: Danna García; Christian Meier; Rafael Amaya
- Music by: Tulio Cremisini
- Country of origin: United States
- Original language: Spanish
- No. of episodes: 116

Production
- Executive producer: Aurelio Valcárcel Carroll
- Producer: Diana Ariza
- Cinematography: José Luis Velarde; Ignacio González; Miguel Font
- Editor: Macorix Perera
- Camera setup: Multi-camera
- Production company: Telemundo Studios

Original release
- Network: Telemundo
- Release: September 8, 2010 – February 25, 2011

Alguien Te Mira (Someone's Watching You) is an American Spanish-language telenovela produced by United States–based television network Telemundo. This thriller/mystery film is a remake of Chilean telenovela Alguien te mira produced by TVN in 2007.

Telemundo aired this series during the 2010–2011 season, from Monday to Friday over about 26 weeks. As with most of its other telenovelas, the network broadcasts English subtitles as closed captions on CC3. The series was filmed and set in Chicago, although some scenes were filmed in studios in Miami.

This show's jazzy, English-language recurring theme is You Still Love Me, performed by Ray Chang.

== Plot ==
Chicago 2005—Rodrigo Quintana, Piedad Estévez, Julián García and Benjamín Morandé are inseparable friends. Full of ideals and projects for the future, they study medicine and dream of working together to help those most in need. Rodrigo (Christian Meier) is the most intelligent and natural leader of the group. His personality conquered Piedad (Danna García) with whom he lives an intense and stormy love, while Julián (Rafael Amaya) loves her in silence. But the intensity of Quintana added to its addiction to drugs and alcohol ended up deteriorating its relationship with Piedad. To the point that disappears of their lives after a confused incident that leaves a dead person and to Piedad hospitalized. Rodrigo left his friends and his studies to go to a rehabilitation clinic outside the country.

Chicago 2010–5 years later and when Benjamín (David Chocarro) married Tatiana Wood (Géraldine Bazán), Julián and Piedad have forgotten that time, Rodrigo returns to their lives. Members of the Clinic, Chicago Advanced Clinic, the three doctors discover that the return of Rodrigo Quintana, after years of residence in Europe, continues to disturb them. Friends have changed. While Quintana opted for an austere lifestyle in a rural office, his friends have accumulated a small fortune by operating the eyes of high society. His return also causes a break in the routine of Piedad, who will discover that, despite everything, Rodrigo is still the great love of his life.

Shortly afterwards a series of murders began to occur to women and all agreed that the murdered woman was single mother and of good economic position. Some begin to suspect others. Only one of them is the real killer.

== Cast ==
=== Main ===
- Danna García as Piedad Estévez
- Christian Meier as Rodrigo Quintana
- Rafael Amaya as Julián García Correa
- David Chocarro as Benjamín Morandé
- Géraldine Bazán as Tatiana Wood
- Karla Monroig as Matilde Larraín
- Angélica Celaya as Eva Zanetti
- Rodrigo de la Rosa as Pedro Pablo Peñafiel
- Ximena Duque as Camila Wood
- Yul Bürkle as Mauricio Ostos
- Evelin Santos as Luisa Carvajal
- Diana Franco as Dolores "Lola" Morandé
- Carlos Garín as Fiscal Ángel Maldonado
- Alba Raquel Barros as Yolanda Montoya / Yoyita
- Iván Hernández as Jiménez
- Andrés Mistage as Amador Sánchez
- Cynthia Olavarria as Lucía "Lucy" Saldaña
- Roberto Gatica as Nicolás Gordon
- Andrés Cotrino as Emilio García Larraín
- Sofía Sanabria as Amparo Zanetti
- Ariana Muniz as María Jesús Peñafiel Morandé
- Nicole Arci as María Teresa Peñafiel Morandé
- Natalie Medina as María Esperanza Peñafiel Morandé
- Daniel Fernández as Benjamín "Benjita" Morandé
- Emily Alvarado as Isadora "Isa" Morandé
- Carolina Tejera as Valeria Stewart

=== Special guest stars ===
- Arianna Coltellacci as Blanca Gordon
- Yami Quintero as Angela Argento
- Zuleyka Rivera as Rocío Lynch
- Riczabeth Sobalvarro as Daniela Franco
- Héctor Soberón as Daniel Vidal
- Cristina Figarola as Fabiola Correa
- Jorge Hernández as Edward James Sandberg
- Victoria del Rosal as Amalia Vieyra

== Awards and nominations ==
| Year | Award | Category | Nominated | Result | Ref |
|---|---|---|---|---|---|
| 2011 | Premios People en Español | Best Villain | Rafael Amaya | Nominated | |
