= José Guillermo Cortines =

Dominican actor and singer (born 1973)

- Born: December 5, 1973 (age 52); Santo Domingo, Dominican Republic
- Other name: Memo
- Occupations: Actor, TV presenter, musician, writer
- Years active: 1995–present
- Spouse: Dominique Bonnelly (m. 2006)
- Children: 2
- Website: Official site

José Guillermo Cortines (born December 5, 1973) is a Dominican actor and singer who is involved in films, telenovelas, musical theatre and television. He lives in Dominican Republic and is best known for his role as Mauricio Montiel in Telemundo's "El Rostro de Analía" and for his role as Osvaldo Guerra in Más Sabe el Diablo. He was also the host of the Miss Dominican Republic 2002 and Miss Dominican Republic 2004 beauty pageants. He played a role in the movie La Fiesta del Chivo.

== Biography ==
Jose Guillermo studied in Santo Domingo at Colegio San Judas Tadeo, and at "Centro de Enseñanza El Buen Pastor". He graduated from Universidad Nacional Pedro Henríquez Ureña (UNPHU) in 1996 having specialized in Graphic Design and Publicity. He took singing lessons with Frank Ceara, María Remolá and Nadia Niccola.

== Career ==
He started his artistic career playing guitar in Rock bands. In the early 1990s, he entered television as host on programs such as, "Sin la Muela en Vivo" broadcast by "Mango TV" channel owned by Juan Luis Guerra and he also hosted "Cocoloco Internacional", "Boulevard 37", "Bureo Café" and more. He played in the popular TV miniseries, "Hasta que la Muerte nos Separe", "Cuando llama el Amor", "El Planeta" and "Apartamento 402" for Mariasela Alvarez's weekly program, "Esta Noche Mariasela". He also appeared in Paraíso which aired in Spain.

In 1997, his roles in the theater earned him popularity. Under the direction of producer Nuryn Sanlley, he played the role of Tony Manero on Saturday Night Fever, "LP Mision Disponible", and The Sound of Music. In 1999, he worked in the musicals Los Tres Mosqueteros and La Pinky, Grease.

In 2003 he worked with producer Amaury Sánchez, in "Sonido para una Imagen" and in 2005 in "Disco Forever". Other plays in which he appeared are La Bella y la Bestia, "Los Piratas de Barba Negra" and "Una Fiesta Inolvidable". In 2008 he played Marius Pontmercy in "Los Miserables". He played the character Osvaldo Guerra in Telemundo's Más Sabe El Diablo.

He received an award for his role in Tropico with José Luis Rodríguez "El Puma", from the Magazine Carteles in Miami. This novela was transmitted by Antena Latina in the Dominican Republic and by Univision in the United States.

== Films ==
In 2011, he had a role in the Dominican film, "Tres al Rescate".

He played Antonio de la Maza in the film La Fiesta del Chivo based on the novel by Mario Vargas Llosa. In 2004 he worked in "Negocios son Negocios" and "Los Locos También Piensan".

In 2024, he voiced Jacques Puasón, Bobby Flashington, Máximo Waxon and DJ in the Dominican animated film Captain Avispa.

== Present ==
In 2009 Cortines worked on the telenovela, El Rostro de Analía on Telemundo playing the role of Mauricio Montiel – the older brother of Daniel and Adrianita's uncle.

He played the role of the attorney, Osvaldo Guerra in "Más Sabe el Diablo" and the leading role in "Amores de luna" as Javier Arenas for Telemundo.

In 2012 he was elected by Luz García's Noche de Luz programme as a "Summer's Hot Body".

He was also on the cast of "Sacrificio de Mujer" on Venevisión, playing Marcos Castillo and in "Eva Luna" for Univisión as Bruno Lombardi. In 2013 he participated in the telenovela "Marido En Alquiler" on Telemundo, starring Sonya Smith and Juan Soler, with Maritza Rodriguez and Miguel Varoni playing the antagonists, the young couple in the telenovela: Gabriel Coronel and Kimberly Dos Ramos. The telenovela also includes stars such as Roberto Manrique and Ana Carolina Grajales.

José Guillermo is currently working as TV host in the nightly show Chévere Nights alongside Milagros Germán.

== Family ==
His parents are José Rafael Cortines Cajarvilles and María Evelina Dominguez de Cortines.

He has been married since 2006 to Dominican actress and presenter Dominique Bonnelly.

He has two daughters: the first named Marah (b. 2001) from a previous relationship and the second Amelie (b. 2018) with his current wife, Dominique.

== Filmography ==
Film roles
Year	Title	Roles	Notes
2004	Negocios son negocios	Laura's Boyfriend	
2005	Los locos también piensan	Pablo Cardona	
2005	La fiesta del Chivo	Tavito de la Maza	
2006	Viajeros	Lawyer	
2011	3 al rescate	Bilpo	Voice role
2013	Ponchao	Fernando	
2014	El Pelotudo	Rigo	
2014	Código Paz	Fernando del Rosario	
2015	Pa'l campamento	Héctor	
2016	Loki 7	Pietro Francesco	
2017	Pasao de libras	Alejandro	
2022	The Pink Unicorn	Tony	
2024	Captain Avispa	Jacques Puasón / Bobby Flashington / Máximo Waxon / DJ	Voice role

Television roles
Year	Title	Roles	Notes
2007	Trópico	Juan Pablo Guzmán	Recurring role; 100 episodes
2008–2009	El Rostro de Analía	Mauricio Montiel	Recurring role; 98 episodes
2009	Más sabe el diablo	Osvaldo Guerra	Episode: "Caso de Jimmy Cardona"
2010	Eva Luna	Bruno Lombardi	Recurring role
2011	Sacrificio de mujer	Marcos Castillo	Recurring role
2012	Corazón apasionado	Marcos Pérez / Martín Vegas	Recurring role
2012	Corazón valiente	Renzo Mancilla	Guest role; 13 Episodes
2012	Mia Mundo	Ryan Belt	Episode: "Listen to Your Heart"
2012–2013	El rostro de la venganza	Alex Maldonado	Recurring role
2012	Secreteando	Man in Black Suit #1	Episode: "El chisme de los chismes"
2013–2014	Marido en alquiler	Máximo Durán	Recurring role; 77 episodes
2015–2016	Bajo el mismo cielo	Cristóbal Méndez	Recurring role; 94 episodes
2018	Mi familia perfecta	Tito Pérez	Recurring role
