= A Separate Wind =

- Theatrical release poster
- Directed by: Alejandro Gerber Bicecci
- Written by: Alejandro Gerber Bicecci
- Produced by: Alejandro Gerber Bicecci; Julio Bárcenas
- Starring: Tomihuatzi Xelhuantzi; Valentina Buzzurro; Úrsula Pruneda
- Cinematography: Martin Boege
- Edited by: Rodrigo Ríos; Irina Gómez
- Music by: Alejandro Otaola
- Production companies: Albricias Producción; Estudios Churubusco Azteca S.A.
- Release dates: March 23, 2014 (GIFF); July 10, 2015 (Mexico)
- Running time: 96 minutes
- Country: Mexico
- Language: Spanish

A Separate Wind (Spanish: Viento aparte, lit. 'Wind apart') is a 2014 Mexican drama road movie written, directed and co-produced by Alejandro Gerber Bicecci. Starring Tomihuatzi Xelhuantzi, Valentina Buzzurro and Úrsula Pruneda. The film was named on the shortlist for Mexico's entry for the Academy Award for Best Foreign Language Film at the 88th Academy Awards, but it was not selected.

== Synopsis ==
Omar and Karina's mother has a stroke during the family holidays. The siblings, drifting apart, will start a long journey through Mexico towards their grandmother's house. On the road they will face a broken and divided country. Where mistrust, resentment and violence are everywhere. Diverse characters -strangers on their own land- will lead them, in labyrinthic stages, until their final destiny.

== Cast ==
The actors participating in this film are:

- Tomihuatzi Xelhuantzi as Tomd
- Valentina Buzzurro as Karina
- Úrsula Pruneda as Luz
- Margarita Chavarría as Emilia
- Mario Balandra as Cipactli
- Sebastián Cobos as Omar
- Desiderio Däxuni as Ezequiel
- Alberto Lomnitz as Joaquin
- Miguel Ángel López as Raymundo
- Pamela Samaniego as Camila
- Antonio Zúñiga as Sergio
- Roberto Mares as Man with machete
- Clementina Guadarrama as Woman with coffin
- Érika Garcia as Anayazni

== Production ==
Principal photography was recorded in San Luis Potosí, as well as Oaxaca, Puebla, Hidalgo, Chihuahua, and Mexico City in 2013.

== Release ==
It had its world premiere on March 23, 2014, at the 29th Guadalajara International Film Festival. It had its commercial premiere on July 10, 2015, in Mexican theaters.

== Accolades ==
Year	Award / Festival	Category	Recipient	Result	Ref.
2014	Guadalajara International Film Festival	Best Mexican Film Digital Creative City	Alejandro Gerber Bicecci	Nominated	
2014	Warsaw Film Festival	1-2 Competition	Alejandro Gerber Bicecci	Nominated	
2014	International Film Festival of the Americas	Audience Award	Alejandro Gerber Bicecci	Won	
2014	Pantalla de Cristal Film Festival	Best Director	Alejandro Gerber Bicecci	Nominated	
2014	Pantalla de Cristal Film Festival	Best Screenplay	Alejandro Gerber Bicecci	Nominated	
2014	Pantalla de Cristal Film Festival	Best Screen Production Values	Alejandro Gerber Bicecci & Julio Bárcenas Sánchez	Won	
2014	Pantalla de Cristal Film Festival	Best Editing	Iria Gómez Concheiro & Rodrigo Ríos	Won	
2014	Cineseptiembre Film Fest	Honorable Mention	Alejandro Gerber Bicecci	Won	
