= El rostro de la venganza =

American telenovela

- Genre: Telenovela
- Created by: Sebastián Arrau
- Written by: Adela Boltansky; Mariano Calasso; Teresa Donato
- Story by: Sebastián Arrau
- Directed by: Nicolás Di Blasi; Jaime Segura
- Creative director: Óscar Cortés
- Starring: Saúl Lisazo; Maritza Rodríguez; Sandra Beltrán; Marilyn Patiño; Margarita Rosa Arias; Elizabeth Gutiérrez; David Chocarro; Marlene Favela
- Theme music composer: Tulio Cremisini
- Opening theme: "Volver a nacer" performed by Deanette; "La venganza" performed by Tulio Cremisini and Pedro Castillo
- Country of origin: United States
- Original language: Spanish
- No. of episodes: 173

Production
- Executive producer: Aurelio Valcárcel Carroll
- Producer: Jairo Arcila
- Cinematography: Joseph Martínez; Argemiro Saavedra
- Camera setup: Multi-camera

Original release
- Network: Telemundo
- Release: July 30, 2012 – April 12, 2013

Related
- Relaciones peligrosas Sin Tetas No Hay Paraiso; El Señor de los Cielos

El Rostro de la Venganza (Lit: The Face of Vengeance / English: Facing Destiny) is a Spanish-language telenovela produced by United States–based television network Telemundo Studios, Miami. David Chocarro, Elizabeth Gutiérrez and Cynthia Olavarria starred as the protagonist, with the special participation of Maritza Rodríguez, while Saúl Lisazo and Marlene Favela starred as the antagonists.

== History ==
Telemundo announced a prime-time broadcast of El Rostro de la Venganza on May, as part of the 2012–2013 season. From July 30, 2012, to January 24, 2013, Telemundo aired El Rostro de la Venganza weeknights at 10:30pm/9:30c, following half-hour of Pablo Escobar: El Patrón del Mal. From January 28, 2013, and onwards, Telemundo aired one-hour episodes, replacing Pablo Escobar. The last episode was broadcast on April 12, with El Señor de los Cielos replacing it. As with most of its other telenovelas, the network broadcast English subtitles as closed captions on CC3.

== Plot ==
El Rostro de la Venganza tells the story of Diego Mercader (Jorge Eduardo García), an 8-year-old boy, bullied and harassed in school by his classmates. He suffers a breakdown and is urged by unknown persons to shoot 7 of his colleagues, being given access to a gun from a lockroom. Accused of the mass murder, he enters a prison for psychological diseases.

Twenty years later, psychiatrist Antonia Villaroel (Maritza Rodríguez) obtains his liberation by legal means and with the support of a generous benefactor Ezequiel Alvarado (Saúl Lisazo).

Diego is being given a new identity, the one of Martín Méndez (David Chocarro) and tries to renew his life under the employment of Ezequiel. He is put as the personal bodyguard of his fiancée, Mariana (Elizabeth Gutiérrez), compromised in an outrageous relationship with his son, Luciano (Jonathan Islas).

He will find himself in a maze of intrigues and betrayal, sustained by Antonia's decision to find the truth about the murders and by Ezequiel's family. Later Mariana and Antonia are killed by Alicia and Alicia takes the lead role and it is later revealed that she is Eva Samaniego out for revenge.

== Cast changes ==
The initial cast was announced to be Elizabeth Gutiérrez as Antonia, Iván Sánchez as Diego/Martín and Maritza Rodríguez as Mariana.

David Chocarro was originally to play Luciano Alvarado at the very beginning, nevertheless being rather proposed for the lead. The role of Luciano was given to the former leading actor Iván Sánchez, who was let out from the final production due to his constant discontent with the plot. Eventually, Jonathan Islas took the part.

Maritza Rodríguez and Elizabeth Gutiérrez exchanged roles; Rodríguez had been cast as Antonia, and Gutiérrez as Mariana.

After two weeks of broadcast, Gutiérrez announced she was leaving the production, thus letting the series without a female protagonist, as Rodríguez had only played a special role. The initial plot had to be changed, with her character getting killed halfway through.

Marlene Favela was cast in with a new role to substitute the lead. Marlene Favela's character was changed from a Protagonist to an Antagonist as the telenovela went on.

== Cast ==
=== Main ===
- Saúl Lisazo as Ezequiel Alvarado. Antagonistic protagonist, later becomes good
- Maritza Rodríguez as Antonia Villarroel. Co-protagonist. Killed by Valeria Samaniego
- Elizabeth Gutiérrez as Mariana San Lucas. Co-protagonist. Killed by Alicia
- David Chocarro as Diego Mercader / Martín Méndez. Main protagonist character
- Marlene Favela as Alicia Ferrer / Eva Samaniego. Main villain character, mysterious killer, killed 6 children in the past, loves Martín, ends up in jail

=== Recurring ===
- Jonathan Islas as Luciano Alvarado.
- Felicia Mercado as Valeria Samaniego.
- Roberto Mateos as Federico Samaniego
- Kimberly Dos Ramos as Katerina Alvarado
- José Guillermo Cortines as Alex Maldonado
- Cynthia Olavarría as Diana Mercader
- Gabriela Rivero as Laura Cruz
- Eduardo Serrano as Juan Mercader
- Rebeca Manríquez as Sonia Castro
- Jacqueline Márquez as Tania Stuardo
- Dayana Garroz as Carolina Pinto
- Paloma Márquez as Natalia García
- Wanda D'Isidoro as Verónica Baeza
- Chela Arias as Eliana Alvarado
- Martha Mijares as Manuela Cruz
- Héctor Fuentes as Salvador Casas
- Rafael León as Marcos Alvarado
- Cristian Carabias as Omar Mercader
- William Valdés as Miguel Ángel Samaniego
- Jorge Eduardo García as Juan "Juanito" Mercader / Young Diego Mercader
- Paulo Quevedo as Tomás Buenaventura
- Rodrigo de la Rosa as Víctor Leytón

=== Guest ===
- Adriana Bermudez as Leticia "Lety"
- Sandra Destenave as Sol Luisa / Marcia Rey
- Lorena Gómez as Sandra Arriagada
- Emily Alvarado as Young Carolina Pinto
- Ginna Rodriguez as Young Diana Mercader

== Awards ==
Year	Award	Category	Nominee	Result
2012	Premios People en Español	Best Telenovela	El Rostro de la Venganza	Nominated
2012	Premios People en Español	Best Actor	David Chocarro	Nominated
2012	Premios People en Español	Best Actress	Maritza Rodríguez	Nominated
2012	Premios People en Español	Best Villain	Saúl Lisazo	Nominated
2013	Miami Life Awards	Best Lead Actress	Elizabeth Gutiérrez	Won
2013	Miami Life Awards	Best Lead Actor	David Chocarro	Nominated
2013	Miami Life Awards	Best Supporting Actress	Kimberly Dos Ramos	Won
2013	Miami Life Awards	Best Supporting Actor	José Guillermo Cortines	Nominated
2013	Miami Life Awards	Best Actress Villain	Marlene Favela	Nominated
2013	Miami Life Awards	Best Actor Villain	Jonathan Islas	Nominated
2013	Miami Life Awards	Best First Actress	Felicia Mercado	Nominated
2013	Miami Life Awards	Best First Actor	Saúl Lisazo	Nominated
2013	Miami Life Awards	Best First Actor	Roberto Mateos	Nominated
2013	Miami Life Awards	Best First Actor	Eduardo Serrano	Nominated
2013	Miami Life Awards	Best Telenovela	El Rostro de la Venganza	Nominated
2013	Premios Tu Mundo	Best Supporting Actress	Kimberly Dos Ramos	Nominated
2013	Premios Tu Mundo	Best Supporting Actress	Cynthia Olavarría	Won
2013	Premios Tu Mundo	Best Supporting Actress	Brenda Asnicar	Nominated
2013	Premios Tu Mundo	The Perfect Couple	Maritza Rodríguez & David Chocarro	Nominated
2013	Premios Tu Mundo	Best supporting villain	Isabella Castillo, Vanessa Pose	Won
2013	Premios Tu Mundo	Best Bad Luck Moment	Alicia learns that Tomás is hearing the conversation she have with Natalia	Nominated
