= 2nd Your World Awards =

Annual US media awards show

2013 Premios Tu Mundo
- Date: August 15, 2013
- Location: American Airlines Arena in Miami, Florida.
- Country: United States
- Presented by: Gaby Espino; Aarón Díaz

Television/radio coverage
- Network: Telemundo

The 2013 edition of Your World Awards, an annual awards show, was produced by Telemundo, broadcast live on August 15, 2013, at 8pm/7c from the American Airlines Arena in Miami, Florida. Voting for nominees started on June 26 and ended on July 24 at 12pm ET. The finalists were announced on July 31, and winners were announced on August 15, 2013.

== Winners and nominees ==
=== Telenovela ===
Novela of the Year	Favorite Lead Actress
La Patrona; Pablo Escobar, El Patrón del Mal; Pasión Prohibida; El Señor de los Cielos	Aracely Arámbula - La Patrona; Carla Hernández - Rosa Diamante; Mónica Spear - Pasión Prohibida; Ximena Herrera - El Señor de los Cielos
Favorite Lead Actor	The Best Bad Boy
Jencarlos Canela - Pasión Prohibida; Andrés Parra - Pablo Escobar, El Patrón del Mal; Rafael Amaya - El Señor de los Cielos; Jorge Luis Pila - La Patrona	Robinson Díaz - El Señor de los Cielos; Christian de la Campa - La Patrona; Tomás Goros - La Patrona; Henry Zakka - Pasión Prohibida
The Best Bad Girl	Best Supporting Actress
Christian Bach - La Patrona; Fernanda Castillo - El Señor de los Cielos; Rebecca Jones - Pasión Prohibida; Sara Corrales - El Señor de los Cielos	Cynthia Olavarría - El Rostro de la Venganza; Kimberly Dos Ramos - El Rostro de la Venganza; Angélica Celaya - El Señor de los Cielos; Alexandra de la Mora - La Patrona
Best Supporting Actor	First Actor
Gonzalo García Vivanco - La Patrona; José Guillermo Cortines - El Rostro de la Venganza; Diego Soldano - La Patrona; Raúl Méndez - El Señor de los Cielos	Saúl Lisazo - El Rostro de la Venganza; Henry Zakka - Pasión Prohibida; Roberto Vander - Pasión Prohibida; Javier Díaz Dueñas - La Patrona
First Actress	The Perfect Couple
Christian Bach - La Patrona; Lupita Ferrer - Rosa Diamante; Rebecca Jones - Pasión Prohibida; Surya Macgrégor - La Patrona	Aracely Arámbula & Jorge Luis Pila - La Patrona; Christian Bach & Diego Soldano - La Patrona; Maritza Rodríguez & David Chocarro - El Rostro de la Venganza; Rafael Amaya & Ximena Herrera - El Señor de los Cielos
Best Bad Luck Moment	
The hospital is engulfed in fire - La Patrona; Pablo is discovered - Pablo Escobar, El Patrón del Mal; Accident - Pasión Prohibida; Alicia learns that Tomás is hearing the conversation he has with Natalia - El Rostro de la Venganza

=== Music ===
Party Starter Song	Most Popular Song of the Year
Gerardo Ortíz - Damaso; Daddy Yankee - Limbo; Elvis Crespo - Pegaito Suavecito; Tito el Bambino El Patrón ft. Marc Anthony - Por Que Les Mientes	Prince Royce - Incondicional; Roberto Tapia - Mirando al Cielo; Wisin & Yandel ft. Chris Brown & T-Pain - Algo Me Gusta de Ti; Don Omar - Zumba
Best Music Video	
Alerta Zero - Invencible; Gerardo Ortiz - Damaso; Jesse & Joy ft. Mario Domm - Llorar; Wisin & Yandel ft. Chris Brown - Algo Me Gusta de Ti

=== Variety ===
I'm Sexy and I Know It	Favorite Latino in Hollywood
Gaby Espino; Aarón Díaz; Pitbull; Chino y Nacho	Michelle Rodríguez - Fast & Furious 6; Jenni Rivera - FillyBrown; Pitbull - Epic-Animated; Zoé Saldaña - Star Trek Into Darkness
Sports Sensation of the Year	#MostSocial
Lionel Messi; Orlando Cruz; Chicharito Hernández; Equipo Olímpico de Futbol – Mexico	María Celeste Arrarás - TeamMaríaCeleste; Prince Royce - Roycenaticas; Ximena Duque & Fabián Ríos - DuqueRios; Adamari López - AdamariFans
Best Moment of Reality	Favorite Viral Video
Caso Cerrado; Alerta Zero; I Love Jenni; La Voz Kids	Peter La Anguila & El Pichy Films - El Estilo de Peter La Anguila; PSY - Gangnam Style; Sofía Vergara - Secret Diet; The Secret of La Chancla - mun2

== Other Special Awards ==
- Mero Mero Award - Rafael Amaya
- Musical Power Award - Daddy Yankee
- ALMA Award of Your World - Eva Longoria
- Favorite of the Night Award - Gaby Espino
