= The Pink Unicorn =

- Theatrical release poster
- Directed by: Taba Blanchard
- Written by: Isaac Saviñón; Junior Rosario; Gustavo López
- Produced by: Isaac Saviñón
- Starring: Isaac Saviñón; José Guillermo Cortines; Lydia Li; Alina Rancier
- Cinematography: Frankie Baez
- Edited by: Taba Blanchard
- Music by: David Vásquez
- Production companies: Rulin Films
- Distributed by: HAL-2046 Films
- Release date: October 13, 2022
- Country: Dominican Republic
- Languages: English; Spanish; Mandarin Chinese

The Pink Unicorn (Spanish: El App, lit. 'The App') is a 2022 Dominican action thriller film directed by Taba Blanchard and written by Isaac Saviñón and Junior Rosario Gustavo López. It stars Saviñón, José Guillermo Cortines, Lydia Li and Alina Rancier along with Kristen Hung, William Beckwith, Raymond Jáquez, Víctor Ramírez, Juan María Almonte, Ralph Joseph, Arturo Báez, Sebastian Kahuna and Ruairi Rhodes. It premiered on October 13, 2022, in Dominican theaters.

== Synopsis ==
Jackie, one of the most renowned hackers in the world, created his masterpiece: an application that allows you to hack into any social media account just by using that person's phone number, making them more vulnerable to information theft, including your own. which was already deleted. This in the wrong hands can lead to chaos and once its existence has been made public in an online post, the life of its creator is in danger.

== Cast ==
- Issac Saviñón as Jackie 'N3xt3p'
- José Guillermo Cortines as Tony
- Lydia Li as Ying Yue
- Kristen Hung as Ming
- Alina Rancier
- Sebastian Kahuna

== Production ==
Principal photography began on December 1, 2019, in Boston, United States and then in the Dominican Republic.

== Accolades ==
Year	Award / Festival	Category	Recipient	Result	Ref.
2022	Dominican Film Festival New York	Best Feature Film – Jury Special Mention	The Pink Unicorn	Won	
2022	Dominican Film Festival New York	Best Actor	Issac Saviñón	Won	
2023	Soberano Awards	Best Actor	Issac Saviñón	Nominated	
2023	La Silla Awards	Best Director	Taba Blanchard	Nominated	
2023	La Silla Awards	Best Editing	Taba Blanchard	Won	
2023	La Silla Awards	Best Musicalization	David Vásquez	Nominated	
2023	La Silla Awards	Best Song	Radi Pina & Le Montro ("Melanoid")	Nominated	
2023	La Silla Awards	Best Cinematography	Frankie Báez	Nominated	
2023	La Silla Awards	Best Makeup	Gigi Jimenez	Nominated	
2023	La Silla Awards	Best Special Effects	La Visual Sonora	Nominated	
2023	La Silla Awards	Best Visual Effects	La Visual Sonora	Nominated	
2023	ADOPRESCI Awards	Best Musicalization	David Vásquez	Nominated	
