= Rafael Amaya =

Mexican actor (born 1977)

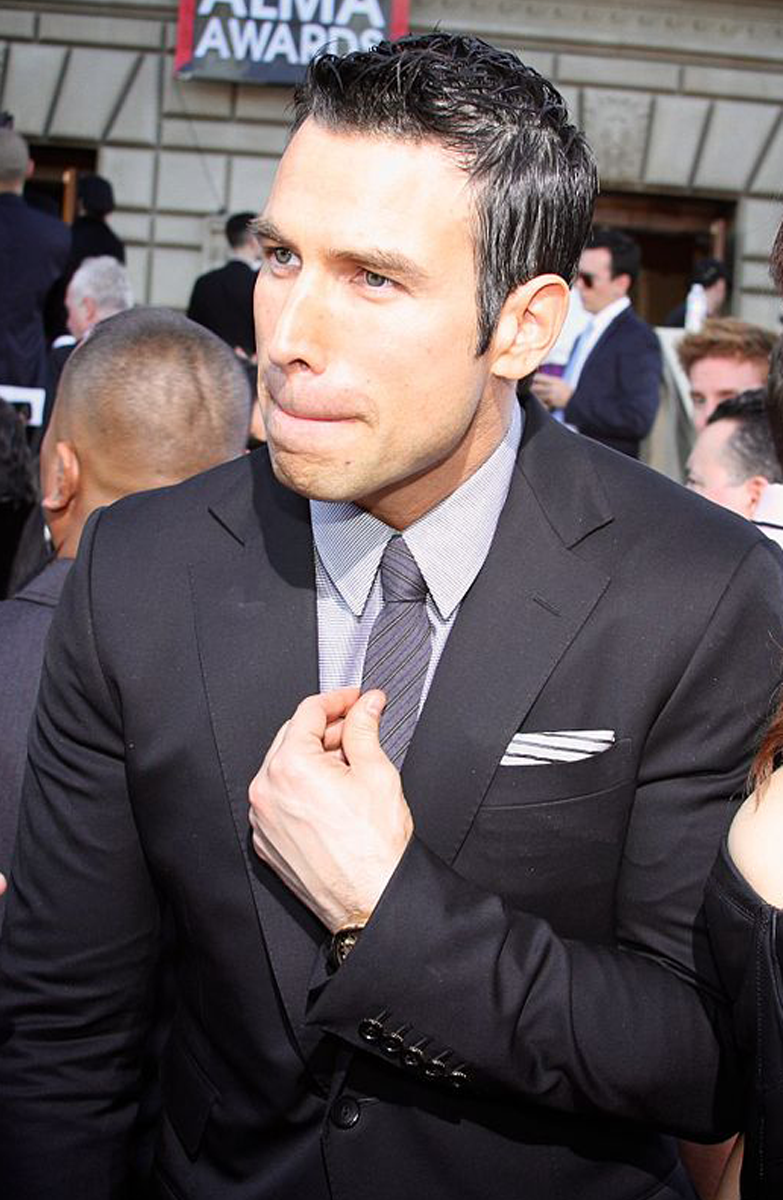
- Amaya at the 2013 Alma Awards
- Born: José Rafael Amaya Núñez; 28 February 1977 (age 49); Hermosillo, Sonora, Mexico
- Occupation: Actor
- Years active: 2000–present
- Height: 1.83 m (6 ft 0 in)
- Partners: Ana Layevska (2007–2010); Angélica Celaya (2010–2015)

José Rafael Amaya Núñez (born 28 February 1977) is a Mexican actor, born in Hermosillo, Mexico. He is best known for his character Aurelio Casillas in the Telemundo series El Señor de los Cielos.

== Biography ==
Rafael Amaya was born in Hermosillo, Mexico, but when he was five years old, his family moved to Tecate, Baja California where he grew up. In his adolescence, he took theater and music classes. Upon entering college, he moved to San Diego, California to study but left school before graduating. After leaving college, he returned to Mexico to try his luck with a music group, the Palapa Band, which did not prosper. Amaya decided to enroll in the Centro de Educación Artística of Televisa, attempting to enter the world of music with another group, Garibaldi, with which he recorded two albums.

== Career ==
=== Beginnings and notable roles (2000–2010) ===
After leaving his short musical career, in 2000, his first acting role was on the telenovela La casa en la playa, where he played Romualdo; after gaining attention in the role, he received offers for roles in other productions. In 2001, he was cast in the role of Cástulo in Sin pecado concebido. In 2002, he was given his first lead role in the telenovela Salomé, where he plays José Julián, one of Salomé's three sons, a role that solidifies him as a bonafide actor and earns him two nominations, one for the El Heraldo de México and another for the TVyNovelas Awards. In that same year, he is called to be part of the cast of Las vías del amor. In 2003, he again secures a leading role in the telenovela Amar otra vez with Irán Castillo and Valentino Lanús. His film debut comes in 2004 with the film Desnudos, in which he shares credits with Karyme Lozano and Isabel Madow. In 2006, he goes to Miami, United States to film Las dos caras de Ana with his ex-partner Ana Layevska. In that same year, he returns to the cinema co-starring with Ana de la Reguera and Gabriela Platas in the controversial film Así del precipicio. In February 2008, he began filming 24 cuadros de terror, where for the first time in his career, he played a serial killer. In that same year he filmed the romantic comedy film Amor letra por letra with Plutarco Haza and Silvia Navarro, which premiered in August of that year. He also participated in the film Me gustas tú, a film that pays homage to the late comedian Germán Valdés, which also stars Carmen Salinas and Luis Felipe Tovar. That year proved to be a busy one with much activity having also appeared in the series Mujeres asesinas and Sexo y otros secretos. At the end of that same year, he began filming the feature film North, a thriller about immigrants who were robbed of their organs and then trafficked. He also appeared in the video clip of Enrique Iglesias song, "Lloro Por Ti".

In 2009 he ventured further into the film industry. The frantic activity continued in 2010 playing Julián García Correa, a doctor with a mental disorder, in the telenovela of Telemundo Alguien te mira. This production was the first time in which Amaya played a villain in a telenovela. In 2011 he had a brief role in the very successful telenovela La Reina del Sur, playing the role of “El Guero,” who was the love interest of Kate del Castillo’s character and was the foundation on which the role of Aurelio Casillas in “Senor de Los Cielos” was based (both characters were pilots who had their own fleets of planes which were used to transport drugs for Mexico's most notorious cartels). In that same year, he traveled to Spain to participate in two series Hospital Central and Doctor Mateo and in the film La piel azul.

=== Mainstream and critical success (2013–present) ===
After his trip to Spain, he was absent from the acting world for a year and a half. In 2013 he joined the cast of the television film of Hallmark Channel, entitled Meddling Mom, which had begun filming 2012, and where he played Pablo. In that same year, he was selected by Telemundo to play Aurelio Casillas a famous drug trafficker in the super series El Señor de los Cielos, which is based on the life of Amado Carrillo Fuentes. Thanks to his performance he won as Favorite Lead Actor at the 2014 Premios Tu Mundo. Since first taking on this career-making role, he has won the prize three times consecutively in all the awards galas of Premios Tu Mundo. In 2014, he appeared in the short film Kiss of Vengeance, and in the film based on the life of the actor Cantinflas. He also participated in two episodes in the series Señora Acero as Aurelio Casillas. In 2015 he got his first lead role in a film, entitled Oro y polvo.

In 2016 he also had a guest role (and cameo appearance) in the American series Queen of the South, which was an adaptation of the telenovela La Reina del Sur, where he also played Aurelio Casillas. In December of that same year, he again played Aurelio in the spin-off of the series El Señor de los Cielos, entitled El Chema.

== Personal life ==
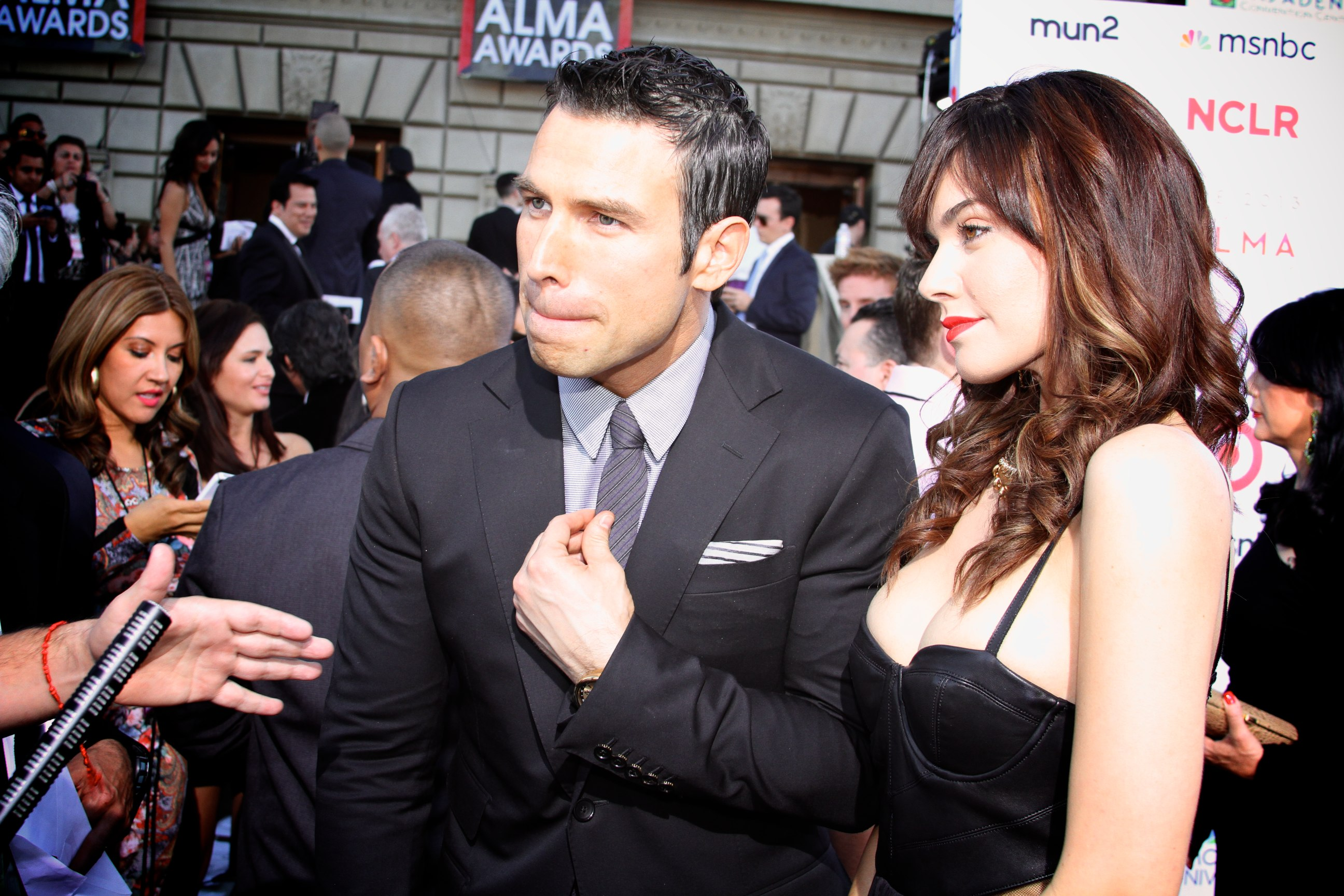
Amaya and Angélica Celaya at the 2013 Alma Awards

Amaya was in a relationship with actress Ana Layevska, whom he met in 2006 while working on the telenovela Las dos caras de Ana. In 2007, they made their relationship official and both actors committed to getting married, but in 2010 Amaya ended his relationship with Layevska. In 2010, after ending his relationship with Layevska, he confirmed his relationship with the actress Angélica Celaya, whom he met in the telenovela Alguien te mira. In 2014, they got engaged, but ended their relationship in 2015.

== Filmography ==
=== Film ===
Year	Title	Roles	Notes
2004	Desnudos	Pablo	
2006	Así del precipicio	Gerardo	
2008	Amor letra por letra	Julián	
2008	Fotonovela	Ángel	
2008	24 cuadros de terror	Lady Killer	
2009	El descubrimiento	Barman	Short film
2009	Se jodió la Navidad	Man at the party	Short film
2009	The Fighter	Leone	
2009	Pepe y Santo vs América	Julio	
2009	Me importas tú, y tú	Unknown role	
2009	Días extraños	Unknown role	Short film
2010	Rock Marí	Pablo	
2010	Sin memoria	Raúl	
2010	Adiós mundo cruel	Luis Armando	
2010	Atrocious	Psiquiatra	Voice role; Spanish dubbing
2014	Kiss of Vengeance	Aldo	Short film
2014	Cantinflas	Frank Sinatra	
2015	Oro y polvo	Daniel	

=== Television roles ===
Year	Title	Roles	Notes
2000	La casa en la playa	Romualdo Reyes	
2001	Sin pecado concebido	Cástulo Campos Ortiz	
2001	Mujer, casos de la vida real	Unknown role	2 episodes
2001	Salomé	José Julián	
2002	Las vías del amor	Paco / Pablo Rivera	
2004	Amar otra vez	Fernando Castañeda Eslava	
2006	Las dos caras de Ana	Rafael Bustamante / Gustavo Galván	
2007–2009	Ugly Betty	Lorenzo	Guest role (seasons 2–3); 4 episodes
2008	Los simuladores	Rubalcaba	Episode: "El pacto copernico"
2008	Mujeres asesinas	Óscar	Episode: "Claudia, cuchillera"
2008	Sexo y otros secretos	Martín	Main role (season 1); 12 episodes
2009	La ruleta de los sueños	Dan	Television film
2010	La piel azul	Fernando	Television film
2010–2011	Alguien te mira	Julián García Correa	Main role; 116 episodes
2011	Hospital Central	Enrique Guerrero	Recurring role (season 19); 9 episodes
2011	La Reina del Sur	Raimundo Dávila Parra "El Güero"	Guest role (season 1); 22 episodes
2011	Doctor Mateo	Roberto	Recurring role (season 5); 12 episodes
2013	Meddling Mom	Pablo	Television film
2013–2026	El Señor de los Cielos	Aurelio Casillas	Main role (seasons 1–6, 8–10); guest (season 7); 720 episodes
2014–2015	Señora Acero	Aurelio Casillas	Guest role (seasons 1–2); 2 episodes
2016–2017	Queen of the South	Aurelio Casillas	Guest role (seasons 1–2); 3 episodes
2016	El Chema	Aurelio Casillas	Guest role; 2 episodes
2021	Malverde: El Santo Patrón	Teodoro Valenzuela	Guest role; 6 episodes

== Awards and nominations ==
Year	Award	Category	Works	Result
2002	TVyNovelas Award	Best Male Revelation	Salomé	Nominated
2007	TVyNovelas Award	Best Actor	Las dos caras de Ana	Nominated
2011	People en Español Awards	Best Supporting Actor	La Reina del Sur	Nominated
2011	People en Español Awards	Best Villain	Alguien te mira	Nominated
2013	Premios Tu Mundo	Favorite Lead Actor	El Señor de los Cielos	Nominated
2013	Premios Tu Mundo	The Perfect Couples (with Ximena Herrera)	El Señor de los Cielos	Nominated
2013	People en Español Awards	Best Actor	El Señor de los Cielos	Nominated
2013	People en Español Awards	The Perfect Couples (with Ximena Herrera)	El Señor de los Cielos	Nominated
2014	Miami Life Awards	Best Male Lead in a Telenovela	El Señor de los Cielos	Nominated
2014	People en Español Awards	Best Male Lead in a Telenovela	El Señor de los Cielos	Nominated
2014	People en Español Awards	Best on-screen chemistry (with Fernanda Castillo)	El Señor de los Cielos	Nominated
2014	Premios Tu Mundo	Favorite Lead Actor	El Señor de los Cielos	Won
2014	Premios Tu Mundo	The Perfect Couples (with Fernanda Castillo)	El Señor de los Cielos	Nominated
2014	Premios Tu Mundo	Qué Papacito	El Señor de los Cielos	Nominated
2015	Premios Tu Mundo	The Best Actor with Bad Luck	El Señor de los Cielos	Won
2015	Premios Tu Mundo	Favorite Lead Actor: Series	El Señor de los Cielos	Won
2015	Premios Tu Mundo	The Perfect Couple (with Carmen Villalobos)	El Señor de los Cielos	Nominated
2016	Miami Life Awards	Best Male Lead in a Telenovela	El Señor de los Cielos	Nominated
2016	Premios Tu Mundo	Favorite Lead Actor: Series	El Señor de los Cielos	Won
2016	Premios Tu Mundo	The Best Actor with Bad Luck	El Señor de los Cielos	Won
2016	Premios Tu Mundo	The Perfect Couple (with Fernanda Castillo)	El Señor de los Cielos	Won
2017	6th Your World Awards	Favorite Lead Actor	El Señor de los Cielos	Won
2017	Produ Awards	Lead Actor - Serie, Superserie or Telenovela of the Year	El Señor de los Cielos	Nominated
2017	Produ Awards	Actor - Best Transmedia Use of the Year	El Señor de los Cielos	Nominated
