= Olimpia (film) =

- Theatrical release poster
- Directed by: José Manuel Cravioto
- Written by: José Manuel Cravioto
- Produced by: Armando Casas; Guadalupe Ferrer Andrade; Mariana Franco; Hugo Villa
- Starring: Nicolasa Ortiz Monasterio; Luis Curiel; Daniel Mandoki; Diego Cataño; Lumi Cavazos; Tiaré Scanda; Rolf Petersen; Valentina Buzzurro
- Cinematography: Ivan Hernandez
- Edited by: Fernanda Morales de la Cerda
- Music by: Andrés Sánchez; Juan Andres Vergara; Francisco Cravioto
- Production companies: Pirexia Films; National Autonomous University of Mexico
- Release dates: October 26, 2018 (MIFF); September 27, 2019 (Mexico)
- Running time: 120 minutes
- Country: Mexico
- Language: Spanish

Olimpia (lit. 'Olympia') is a 2018 Mexican adult animated thriller film written and directed by José Manuel Cravioto. Starring Nicolasa Ortiz Monasterio, Luis Curiel, Daniel Mandoki, Diego Cataño, Lumi Cavazos, Tiaré Scanda, Rolf Petersen and Valentina Buzzurro. It is the first Mexican animated film to fully use the rotoscoping technique. It won the Best Animated Feature Film Award at the 62nd Ariel Awards. The film was named on the shortlist for Mexico's entry for the Academy Award for Best International Feature Film at the 92nd Academy Awards, but it was not selected.

== Synopsis ==
A group of students, members of a brigade at UNAM in the middle of the student movement in Mexico in 1968, who through photographs, filming and writing, will make it known how the army took over the university and its students screamed.

== Cast ==
The actors participating in this film are:

- Nicolasa Ortiz Monasterio as Raquel
- Luis Curiel as Rodolfo
- Daniel Mandoki as Hernán
- Lumi Cavazos as Hernán's mother
- Tiaré Scanda as Raquel's mother
- Rolf Petersen as Hernán's father
- Valentina Buzzurro as Judith, Raquel's sister
- Mariana Azcárate as Student
- Rafa Farías as CUEC student
- Diego Cataño

== Production ==
Principal photography took place in different areas of the National Autonomous University of Mexico in the open areas of the Central Library, the Rectory Tower and the Faculty of Philosophy and Letters lasting 2 weeks in 2017, to then begin the process of animation by rotoscoping using 100 students of the Faculty of Arts and Design lasting 10 months.

== Release ==
It had its world premiere on October 26, 2018 at the 16th Morelia International Film Festival. It was commercially released on September 27, 2019 in Mexican theaters.

== Reception ==
=== Critical reception ===
Elizabeth Limón from En Filme emphasize that it feels fresh in the perspective of the events that occurred in real life, although he comments that the implementation of rotoscoping is a double-edged sword. On the one hand, it manages to provide an innovative element. On the other hand, there are sequences where the characters lack movement. Alejandro Alemán from El Universal wrote: "Olimpia gives too many turns on itself, but it fulfills as one more drama that is framed by that fatal October 2."

=== Accolades ===
Year	Award / Festival	Category	Recipient	Result	Ref.
2018	Morelia International Film Festival	Best Mexican Feature Film	José Manuel Cravioto	Nominated	
2019	FotoFilm Tijuana	Best Mexican Feature Film	José Manuel Cravioto	Nominated	
2019	Canacine Awards	Best Animated Feature Film	José Manuel Cravioto	Nominated	
2020	Ariel Awards	Best Animated Feature Film	José Manuel Cravioto	Won	
