= David Chocarro =

Argentine actor, model, & baseball player (born 1980)

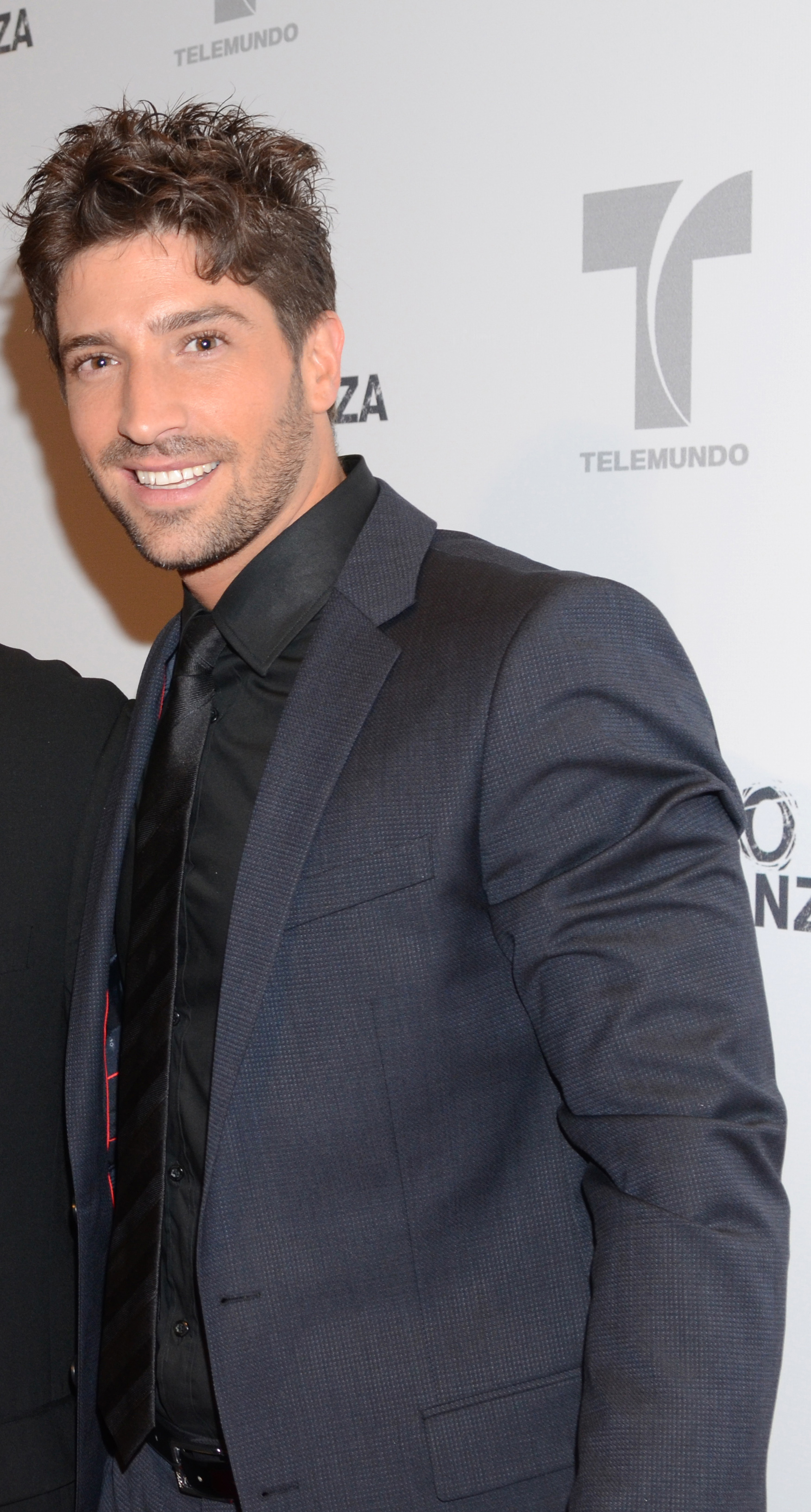
- Chocarro in July 2012
- Occupations: Actor; model; baseball player
- Years active: 2002–present

David Chocarro is an Argentine actor, model and former baseball player.

== Career ==
Chocarro entered the Mexican market for telenovelas through the front door as part of the cast of Los Exitosos Perez. In this story, David played the womanizing Nacho, working with actors like Verónica Castro, Rogelio Guerra, Jaime Camil and Ludwika Paleta.

Chocarro has also been the face of large-scale multinational advertising, as well as developing as a professional baseball player in his country, something rare in Argentina. In 1998, he joined the subsidiary of the New York Yankees in Venezuela.

Currently, Chocarro is working closely with Telemundo, for which he has worked since 2010 as has been the production of suspense and drama Alguien Te Mira. There he played Benjamin Morandé, a philandering physician, who engages with his wife's sister and, together with a group of colleagues, is pursued by a serial murderer. In this production David had the opportunity to project itself as an international actor with the influence of actors like Danna García, Christian Meier and Karla Monroig.

In 2011, along with Telemundo, he played in La Casa de al Lado, a story about everyday life, as well as the secrets and surprises between two families apparently have a normal life. He played the dual role of Adolfo and Leonardo Acosta. This production features the participation of major actors such as Gabriel Porras, Miguel Varoni, Maritza Rodriguez, Ximena Duque, Catherine Siachoque and Daniel Lugo, among others.

In 2012, he played his first lead role in Telemundo's El Rostro de la Venganza in the role of Martin Mendez. This production features the participation of major actors such as Saúl Lisazo and other stars: Maritza Rodriguez, Elizabeth Gutiérrez, Cynthia Olavarria, Marlene Favela, José Guillermo Cortines, and his La Casa de al Lado co-star Felicia Mercado.

== Filmography ==
Film performance
Year	Title	Role	Notes
2022	Valentino, Be Your Own Hero Or Villain	Valentino / Gonzalo Ferrat	
2023	Tangos, Tequilas, y Algunas Mentiras	Diego	
2025	Mirreyes contra Godínez: Las Vegas	Luca	

Television performance
Year	Title	Roles	Notes
2002	Kiebre	Notero 1	Television film
2004	Floricienta	Nicolás	
2006	Alma pirata	Lucas	
2006	Sos mi vida	Doctor	
2008	Casi Ángeles	Matt	Episodes: "Palitos chinos" and "La telenovela"
2008	Los exitosos Pells	Politician	Series regular; 77 episodes
2009–2010	Los exitosos Pérez	Ignacio "Nacho" de la Torre	Series regular; 74 episodes
2010	Aurora	Christian Santana	
2010	Malparida	Roberto Doval Jr.	Series regular; 48 episodes
2010–2011	Alguien te mira	Benjamín Morandé	Main role; 116 episodes
2011–2012	La casa de al lado	Adolfo Acosta Ismael Mora Leonardo Acosta Iván Mora	Main role; 156 episodes
2012–2013	El rostro de la venganza	Martín Méndez / Diego Mercader	Main role; 173 episodes
2014	En otra piel	Diego Ochoa	Main role; 154 episodes
2014	Villa Paraíso	Sebastian Mejía	Main role; 20 episodes
2016–2017	La Doña	Saúl Aguirre	Main role (season 1); 120 episodes
2017	La Fan	Ricardo Ernesto / Richard Ernestón	3 episodes
2018	The Inmate	Santito	Main role; 13 episodes
2018–2019	Señora Acero	Alberto Fuentes	Main role (season 5); 68 episodes
2020–2021	100 días para enamorarnos	Emiliano León	Main role (seasons 1–2); 92 episodes
2021	Así se baila	Himself	Participant
2024	Juegos interrumpidos	Tony Blanco	Main role
2025	Mi verdad oculta	Luciano Lizárraga Arenas	Main role
2027	Te esperaba	Antonio Reyes	Main role

== Awards and nominations ==
Year	Award	Category	Recipient	Result	Ref.
2011	Peoplen en Español Awards	Best Supporting Actor	La casa de al lado	Nominated	
2012	Peoplen en Español Awards	Best Actor	El rostro de la venganza	Nominated	
2013	Miami Life Awards	Best Male Lead in a Telenovela	El rostro de la venganza	Nominated	
2013	2nd Your World Awards	The perfect couple (with Maritza Rodríguez)	El rostro de la venganza	Nominated	
2014	3rd Your World Awards	Favorite Lead Actor	En otra piel	Nominated	
2017	6th Your World Awards	Favorite Lead Actor	La Doña	Nominated	
