= Jaider Villa =

Colombian actor, host and model

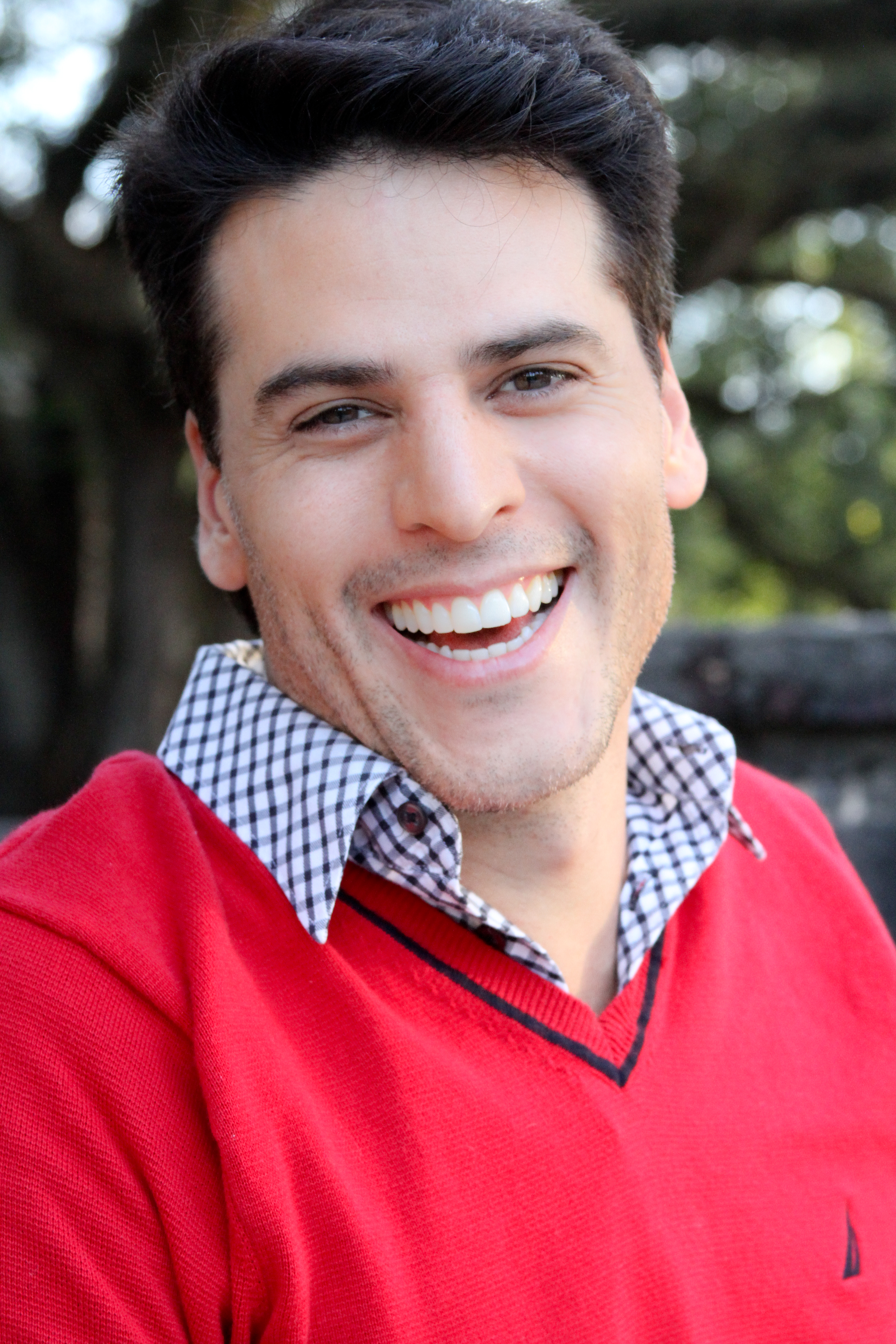
- Born: Jaider Villa Giraldo; 30 January 1977 (age 49); Medellín, Antioquia, Colombia
- Occupations: Actor, director, producer
- Years active: 2002–present

Jaider Villa Giraldo (born 30 January 1977), better known as Jaider Villa, is a Colombian actor, host and model. He began his acting career in a reality show called Protagonistas de Novela in 2002, in which he emerged as the winner. He has appeared in many TV soap operas, for example Al ritmo de tu corazón in which he played Santiago Duque (a leading role); Milagros de Amor, Corazón valiente and others. In 2014 he won the recognition of Miami Mayor Tomás Regalado for his contribution to the art featured in the work "Mesalina" in the leading role as John.

He has done many advertising campaigns for many varied brands such as Coca-Cola, Dish Network, Ford, hhgreg, Lowe's and others.

Television
| Year | Title | Role | Notes |
|---|---|---|---|
| 2002 | Protagonistas de Novela | Himself | Reality show |
| 2003 | Milagros de Amor | Camilo Pizarro | Supporting role |
| 2004 | Al ritmo de tu corazón | Santiago Duque | Leading role |
| 2005 | The storm | Manuel | Supporting role |
| 2006 | Merlina, Mujer Divina | Carrillo | Supporting role |
| 2007 | Así es la Vida | Fernando | Leading role |
| 2007 | Decisiones | Dr. John | Supporting role |
| 2007 | Zorro: La Espada y La Rosa | Comandante Domínguez | Supporting role |
| 2008 | Without Breasts There Is No Paradise | Alberto | Supporting role |
| 2010 | El Clon | Jorge | Supporting role |
| 2010 | Pecadora (telenovela) | Alan Tejeiro | Supporting |
| 2012 | Corazon Valiente | El Ogro "Pata de palo" | Supporting role |
| 2014 | Mesalina | John | Leading role |

== Commercials ==
Television and media
| Year | Title | Role | Notes |
|---|---|---|---|
| 2015 | Coca-Cola | Principal role | Coca-Cola Print |
| 2015 | Novartis | Principal role | Cosentyx See Mee Print |
| 2014 | Novartis | Principal role | Cosentyx Branded pharmaceutical |
| 2013 | Lowe's | Principal role | Backyard home improvement and remodeling |
| 2013 | Amscot | Principal Role | Cash Advance |
| 2013 | Ford | Principal Role | Spot's Noche de perros Unimas |
| 2012 | hhgregg | Host | TV's Brands |
| 2012 | Direct AUTO INSURANCE | Supporting role | JJ Hightail Race Car |
| 2012 | Lowe's | Principal role | mylowes |
| 2011 | Dish Network Latino | Host | 3 commercials: DishLATINO Vs Cable, Vs DirectTV and HD Educational |
| 2011 | Domino's | Principal Role Aka Mario | "Bells & Whistles" Radio Voiceover |
| 2011 | Dish Network Latino | Principal role | TV Everywhere DishLATINO |

== Theater ==
Play
| Year | Title | Role | Theater |
|---|---|---|---|
| 2015 | Nudos | Principal role Aka Marcelo | Paseo de las Artes Doral |
| 2013 | Mesalina | Principal role Aka John | Micro Theater Miami |
| 2004 | Manuela Beltran, La Heroina | Supporting Role | UMB |
| 2004 | Mesa de Juego | Supporting Role | UMB |
| 2004 | una curita para colombia | Supporting Role | UMB |
