= Los pecados de Bárbara =

Mexican television series

- Genre: Dramedy
- Created by: Kirén Miret; Beto López
- Directed by: Emilio Maillé
- Starring: Diana Bovio
- Country of origin: Mexico
- Original language: Spanish
- No. of seasons: 1
- No. of episodes: 25

Production
- Executive producers: Mónica Lozano; Eamon O'Farrill
- Production locations: Huichapan; Hidalgo, Mexico; Mexico City

Original release
- Network: Blim TV
- Release: 15 November 2019

Los pecados de Bárbara is a Mexican dramedy web television series produced by Mónica Lozano and Eamon O'Farrill for Televisa. The production of the series began on 11 March 2019, and was announced on 15 March 2019. It is originally developed by Kirén Miret and Beto López. The plot revolves around Bárbara (Diana Bovio) a woman of irreverent personality who, after an absence of 19 years, is forced to return to her hometown, Santa Prudencia.

The first season has locations in Huichapan, Hidalgo, and Mexico City. It originally released via streaming on Blim TV on 15 November 2019. It premiered on television on 6 January 2020 on Las Estrellas.

== Cast ==
- Diana Bovio as Bárbara
- Antonio Fortier as Jero
- Blanca Guerra as Matilde
- Irán Castillo as Coqui
- Ana Martin as Inés
- Regina Orozco as Lola
- Grettell Valdez as Gloria
- Mauricio Isaac as Félix
- Raquel Becerra as Odaya
- Albi De Abreu as Bosco de Agostini
- Valentina Buzzurro as Elsa
