= The Color of Olives =

- Directed by: Carolina Rivas
- Produced by: Daoud Sarhandi
- Starring: Hani Amer; Monira Amer; And their six children: Nidal, Hisham, Asia, Ishak, Maisa and Shaddad.
- Cinematography: Daoud Sarhandi
- Edited by: Daoud Sarhandi
- Distributed by: Arab Film Distribution
- Release date: 12 July 2006 (U.S.)
- Running time: 97 minutes
- Country: Palestine
- Language: Arabic
- Budget: $35,000

The Color of Olives (Arabic: لون الزيتون, Lawn al-Zaytoon) is a 2006 political documentary film. It was originally distributed by Arab Film Distribution, produced by Daoud Sarhandi, and directed by Carolina Rivas. The film depicts a Palestinian family, the Amers, living in the West Bank.

The documentary was filmed in Masha, a Palestinian village 15 miles from Tel Aviv, that is separated by the West Bank barrier. Hani Amer, a Palestinian farmer, refused to vacate his house and land his ancestors had cultivated for generations. Because the Israelis constructed protective fences, walls and barricades, some of which completely surround their house, the Amers have to pass through various gates to reach their farm's fields or for his six children to get to school. The Color of Olives follows the Amers' everyday work routine and struggles; little dialogue is spoken, although the family is often quoted by Rivas in intertitles that appear on-screen throughout the film.

In the United States, the movie opened in New York at the Two Boots Pioneer Theater in the East Village. It was shown with English subtitles.

== Reception ==
The film received unfavorable reviews.

Variety critic Joe Leydon wrote:

Mexican helmer Carolina Rivas obviously intends her slow-paced and contemplative doc as a testimony to the indomitability of the human spirit under dire circumstances. But the coolly distanced approach to her subjects — who never are allowed to directly address the camera — give the pic the off-putting air of an anthropological study. ...

An unconscionably extended close-up of flies feasting on a dead bird is only the most conspicuous of her visual excesses.

Paul Schrodt stated in Slant Magazine that "She [Rivas] exalts her subject’s struggle to Christ-like mythological sacrifice; wistful silence replaces a potentially enlightening dialogue and glacial, art-serious expressions of destitution deny the region'’s messy moral quandary."

R. Emmet Sweeney wrote in The Village Voice, "The texture of human relations is missing, and so Rivas’s commentary (repeated close-ups of the mother imprisoned by a window frame) comes off as condescending."
