= Protagonistas de Novela =

Protagonistas de Novela (Spanish pronunciation: [pɾotaɣoˈnistas ðe noˈβela]) is a television series in Spanish that has been produced since 2002 by Telemundo Network USA, based on the Protagonistas... franchise.

Protagonistas de Novela has the same format and rules as Protagonistas de la Música, and that is because Protagonistas de Novela, a reality show where the winners are guaranteed a spot in a future telenovela, was released before its musical version. Both shows are produced by Telemundo USA.

The female winner of the show's first season, Millie Ruperto, has already participated in a soap opera, playing a boxing trainer, alongside Venezuelan superstar Gaby Spanic.

The winners of the show's second season in 2003 were Mexican Erick Elías and Dominican Michelle Vargas. This particular season was highly criticized for its results, since Elías won with an alleged 50.1% of the vote over the heavy favorite, Puerto Rican actor Alfredo De Quesada, who had 49.1% of the vote according to the show.

There are also versions of Protagonistas de Novela in Chile (called Protagonistas de la Fama), Colombia and Venezuela. In Chile (airing on Canal 13), the winners were Catalina Bono and Álvaro Ballero. In Colombia (airing on RCN), the winners were Ximena Córdoba and Jaider Villa.
