= Te esperaba =

- Genre: Telenovela
- Based on: A Love to Last by Henry King Quitain and Jay Fernando
- Developed by: Juan Pablo Balcázar; Cecilia Piñeiro; Mariana Achcar; Rosana Curiel
- Directed by: Silvia Tort; Rodrigo Cachero
- Starring: Valentina Buzzurro; David Chocarro
- Country of origin: Mexico
- Original language: Spanish

Production
- Executive producer: Silvia Cano
- Producer: Marco Cano
- Cinematography: Demián Barba; Armando Zafra
- Camera setup: Multi-camera
- Production company: TelevisaUnivision

Original release
- Network: Las Estrellas

Te esperaba is an upcoming Mexican telenovela produced by Silvia Cano for TelevisaUnivision. It is based on the 2017 Philippine television series A Love to Last, created by Henry King Quitain and Jay Fernando. The series stars Valentina Buzzurro and David Chocarro. It is set to premiere on Las Estrellas on 1 February 2027.

== Cast ==
- Valentina Buzzurro as Sofía Canseco
- David Chocarro as Antonio Reyes
- Altair Jarabo
- Ana Bertha Espín
- José Elías Moreno
- Luz María Jerez
- Dalilah Polanco
- Irán Castillo
- Verónica Jaspeado
- Alejandro de la Madrid
- Tiago Correa
- Fernando Ciangherotti
- Paty Díaz
- Claudia Troyo
- Alfredo Gatica
- Raúl Araiza
- José Manuel Rincón
- Mauricio Abularach
- Jessica Segura
- Ana González Bello
- Antonio Fortier
- Axel Ricco
- Daniela Cordero
- Dariana Romo
- Fabrizzio Kajary
- Isa Fernández
- Lex Meral
- Adolfo de la Fuente
- Emiliano Islas
- Charlotte Carter
- Nicolás Pindas
- Zoe Torres
- Ari Placera
- Sammy Schoulund
- Leo Pérez Torreblanca
- Nathalie Beltrán
- Carolina Pérezcano
- Santiago Cachero
- Leonardo Daniel as Antonio Reyes

== Production ==
In May 2026, the series was announced at TelevisaUnivision's upfront for the 2026–2027 television season, with the working title Una segunda oportunidad. On 8 June 2026, executive producer Silvia Cano confirmed Te esperaba as the oficial title of the series. On 7 July 2026, Valentina Buzzurro and David Chocarro were cast in the lead roles. Filming of the telenovela began on 16 July 2026.
