= Milagros de amor =

- Genre: Telenovela
- Written by: Juan Manuel Cáceres; Verner Duarte; Andrea López Jaramillo; Henry Pérez
- Directed by: Toni Navia
- Starring: Maritza Rodríguez; Gregorio Pernía; Edmundo Troya; Carlos Humberto Camacho
- Country of origin: Colombia
- Original language: Spanish
- No. of episodes: 80

Production
- Producer: Amparo Gutiérrez

Original release
- Network: RCN (Colombia); TeleFutura (U.S.)
- Release: 2002

Milagros de Amor ("Miracles of Love") is a Colombian telenovela first aired in 2002. It stars Maritza Rodríguez, Gregorio Pernía, Edmundo Troya and Carlos Humberto Camacho, and ran for 80 episodes.

== Cast ==
- Maritza Rodríguez as Milagros Viuda de Amor
- Gregorio Pernía as Miguel Abril / Emilio Luna
- Edmundo Troya as Vladimiro Peralta Jr.
- Carlos Humberto Camacho as Hernan 'Raton'
- Carolina Lizarazo as Xiomara Corrales
- Helena Mallarino as Virginia
- Vannesa Blandon as Natalia Amor
- Gloria Gómez as Ofelia
- Julio Medina as Vladimiro Peralta
- Carolina Sarmiento as Magaly 'Negra'
- César Mora as Cayetano
- Ana María Arango as Betsabe
- Gustavo Ángel
- Paola Diaz as Nelly
- Luis Fernando Ardila
- Diego León Hoyos
- Patricia Polanco as Esther de Corrales
- Jorge Cárdenas
- Marcela Vanegas
- Pilar Álvarez
- Geoffrey Deakin as Frank Hannsen
- María Elena Döehring as Catalina Pizarro de Hannsen
- Freddy Flórez as Fabrizio
- Lina María Luna
- Andrea Quejuán as Magdalena
- Jaider Villa as Camilo Pizarro
- Maria Alejandra Lopez
