= Panky =

Isaac Saviñón
- Born: Isaac Saviñón; 1975 or 1976 (age 49–50); Dominican Republic
- Other name: Panky
- Occupations: Actor, film producer, creative, story writer, radio and TV host, announcer and singer
- Years active: 1999–present
- Known for: Films: El App, Loki 7, La Gunguna, Shotgun Wedding, Código Paz, Cabarte, Caribe Todo Inclido, Motel, Tres Al Rescate, Virginia Music bands: Metropolitan, Panky y Los Manolos; Radio: Cual es Tu versión?, durante 16 años TV: Panky y Los Manolos, El Despeine, Isaac Saviñón Invita, Sin La Muela En Vivo
- Spouse: Anayari Newman
- Children: 1

Isaac Saviñón is a Dominican actor, film producer, story writer, radio and TV host, announcer, and singer.

He was born 16 December Santo Domingo, Dominican Republic, and from a young age he was drawn to an artistic life, participating in every artistic expression in which he could express himself.

For more than two decades, Saviñón has been engaged in music and television, from major television series such as Mango TV's Panky Los Manolos and radio programs like Cual es tu versión to becoming the lead singer for his pop rock band, Metropolitan. He is now making movies.

Saviñón has been the face of brands such as Pepsi, Brahma, Adidas, Gold's Gym, and Sony. From 2012 until 2015, Saviñón was an ambassador for MTV Staying Alive, a non-profit initiative that strives to educate Hispanic adolescents about the HIV/AIDS virus.

Saviñón is the lead singer of the Dominican rock band Metropolitan.

== Career ==
=== Radio ===
- ¿Cual es tu versión? on La X-102.1 FM, Listin 99.5 FM and Fidelity 94.1 FM

=== Filmography ===
Year	Title	Character	Director	Country
2009	3 al rescate	René el mono / Larry el hurón (voz)	Jorge Morillo	Dominican Republic
2014	Código Paz	Alejandro Vega	Pedro Urrutia	Dominican Republic
2014	Una breve historia de amor	Martín	Alan Nadal Piantini	Dominican Republic
2015	La Gunguna	Martín "El Gago"	Ernesto Alemany	Dominican Republic
2016	Loki 7	Álvaro Romero	Ernesto Alemany	Dominican Republic
2019	Cabarete	Manuel	Ivan Bordas Butler	Dominican Republic
2020	Caribe 'Todo incluído'	Amaury	Miguel García de la Calera	Dominican Republic/Spain/Andorra
2021	Motel	N/A	Various	Dominican Republic
2022	EL APP	Jackie "N3xT3p"	Taba Blanchard	United States/Dominican Republic
2022	Shotgun Wedding	Bride's Family	Jason Moore	United States/Dominican Republic

=== Discography ===
First album "VARIADO" 2004 Panky y Los Manolos, second album "Ironica Tierra" 2006 Panky y Los Manolos, third album "Pop Deluxe" 2013 with his band Metropolitan that continues today.
