= Carolina Rivas =

- Born: Carolina Rivas Suárez; March 4, 1978 (age 48); Santo Domingo, Dominican Republic
- Occupations: Actress; singer; producer
- Spouse: Luichy Guzman
- Children: Jean Luca (2008); Luna Irene (2012)
- Parent(s): Cristina Suárez (mother) and Fernando Rivas (father)
- Relatives: Ana Cristina, Gina Irene and Fernando David (brothers)
- Awards: Premios Casandra
- Musical career
- Years active: 1999 - present
- Formerly of: Cerobit
- Website: carolinarivas.com

Carolina Rivas Suárez (Spanish pronunciation: [ˈkaɾolina ˈriβas ˈswaɾes]; born March 4, 1978) is a Dominican singer, actress and theatre producer.

She has received several awards and nominations, including her win for Premios Casandra in 2009 as producer of the Santo Domingo adaptation of the musical Les Misérables.

== Early life ==
Carolina was born in Santo Domingo, Dominican Republic. Her father, Nandy Rivas, is an advertising executive who conceived the famous 1980's Ron Barceló's commercials "Somos Un Pueblo Que Canta" and "Mi Pueblo Natal", considered by many the best ad campaigns ever made in the country; with music by Juan Luis Guerra, among others. Her mother, Cristina Suárez, is of Spanish descent.

She studied ballet and sang in a choir while in school. She graduated magna cum laude in advertising at Universidad Iberoamericana (UNIBE), but never really exercised her profession for long; she went after her actress and dancing career.

== Career ==
In 2004 Carolina joined Tomás Álvarez (Toque Profundo) in the Cerobit project, in which she also was co-author of most of the songs. Some time later, Carolina left the band to concentrate on her career as an actress.

In 2005 she was invited to sing along with the world-renowned tenor Francisco Casanova in her show Cuando se quiere de veras.

At the end of 2006 she made her first appearance as a solo artist in the show Carolina Todoterreno.

In 2008 she produced the legendary theatrical work Les Misérables at the Teatro Nacional, which earned her the Casandra Award for best work of musical theatre. She returned to produce works as Baño de damas and Rent.

Throughout her career she has performed characters such as Liesl Von Trapp (La novicia rebelde), Norma Cassidy (Victor/Victoria), Eponine (Les Misérables), Roxie Hart (Chicago) and Blancanieves.

In 2010 she made her debut in the world of cinema with the animated film 3 al rescate (3 to the rescue).

== Personal life ==
Carolina is a vegan.

== Filmography ==
=== Theatre ===
Year	Work	Character
2011	Rent	Mimi Marquez
2011	Blancanieves y los siete enanitos	Blancanieves
2010	Chicago	Roxie Hart
2010	Baño de damas	Aurora
2008	Les Misérables	Eponine
2005	Victor/Victoria	Norma Cassidy
2004	Evita	Amante de Perón
2003	Jesucristo Superstar	??
2002	La tiendita del horror	Ronette
2001	Saturday Night Fever	Stephanie Mangano
2000	La novicia rebelde	Liesl Von Trapp
1999	Grease	Frenchie

=== Film ===
Year	Film	Character
2009	3 al rescate	Manuela (voice)
2014	De pez en cuando	Recepcionista
2006	The Color of Olives	Director

== Awards and nominations ==
Year	Category	Work	Result	Ref.
2006	Actress of the year	Victor/Victoria	Nominated	
2009	Musical theatre	Les Misérables	Winner	
2011	Actress of the year	Chicago	Nominated	
