= Al ritmo de tu corazón =

- Genre: Telenovela
- Directed by: Roberto Reyes
- Starring: Jaider Villa; Gabriela Villalba; Myriam de Lourdes; Paola Díaz; Carlos Muñoz
- Country of origin: Colombia
- Original language: Spanish
- No. of episodes: 62

Production
- Producer: Andrés Posada

Original release
- Network: RCN Televisión
- Release: August 10, 2004 – 2004

Al Rítmo de tu Corazón (To the beat of your heart) is a Colombian telenovela produced by Teleset for RCN Television. The show starred Jaider Villa and Gabriela Villalba. It aired for 62 episodes, starting in August 2004.

== Storyline ==
The story centers around Catalina Andrade, a talented 17-year-old studying at a prestigious school in the city, although she is from a middle-class family. Catalina thinks that she is there on a scholarship, but does not know that her grandfather, Matias Duque, paid for her schooling before he died. Catalina does not know that her former music teacher and protector, Don Matias, was her grandfather. Catalina is the result of a relationship between her mother, a teacher, and Fernando Duque, father of James and son of Matias. Fernando never recognized her as his daughter.

Matias died in a suspicious accident. At the funeral, Catalina meets Santiago, grandson of Matias. She is captivated by him. Matias's apparent accident may have been caused by Brenda, the mother of James, as a strategy to control the direction of the school and bring her son back to Paris. To trap her child, Brenda makes him stay as a music teacher at the school. With the help of Daniela Tovar, his former girlfriend, she will attempt to return him to her. But the arrival of Santiago at school reunites him with Catalina, and her feelings are more intense.

Catalina and her classmate, Lina Ruiz, are rivals for Santiago's love.

== Cast ==
- Jaider Villa as Santiago
- Gabriela Villalba as Catalina
- Myriam de Lourdes as Brenda
- Haydée Ramírez as María Clara
- Carlos Muñoz as Matías
- Paola Díaz as Daniela
- Hannah Zea as María Mónica
- Andreah Patapi as Karen
- José Rojas as Aníbal
- Franky Linero as Germán
- Pedro Palacio as Oswaldo
- Mauro Urquijo as Iván Ruiz
- Diana Neira as Yudy
- Paula Bedoya as Eliana
- Jery Sandoval as Cata
- Jenni Osorio as Lina Vanessa
- Alejandra Sandoval as Paola
- María Teresa Barreto as Tatiana
- César Navarro as Jonathan
- Mara Echeverri as Judith
- Inés Mejía as Maruja
- Isabel Campos as Inés
- John Ceballos as Manuel
- John Paul Ospina as Luis Carlos
- Elda Salas as Jimena
- Andrés Ruiz as Rodrigo
- Geoffrey W. Deakin as Juan Diego
- Maria Alejandra Lopez as Silvia
- Juan Pablo Rueda as Julio
- Martha Liliana Ruiz as Beatriz
- Víctor Cifuentes as Pedro
- María Claudia Torres as Susana
- Lucero Galindo as Elvia
