= 3 al rescate =

2011 animated film by Jorge Morillo and Luis Morillo

- Film poster
- Directed by: Jorge Morillo; Luis Morillo
- Written by: Christian López; Edwin Gautreau; Lucy Bedeglez
- Produced by: Jorge Morillo; José Miguel Bonetti
- Starring: Cuquín Victoria; Kenny Grullón; Roger Zayas
- Music by: Alexander Nadal Piantini
- Production companies: Raycast Animation Studio; Antena Latina Films
- Release date: January 6, 2011
- Running time: 80 minutes
- Country: Dominican Republic
- Language: Spanish

3 al rescate (lit. '3 to the rescue') is the first animated film made in the Dominican Republic. It is based on an animated short titled 3 for the Banquet by Raycast Animation Studio. It was directed by Jorge Morillo and Luis Morillo, and written by Christian López, Edwin Gautreau and Lucy Bedeglez. It was also produced by Raycast Animation Studio and Antena Latina Films. It premiered on January 6, 2011 in the Dominican Republic.

== Synopsis ==
It tells the story of a goat (Enrique), a chicken (Frank) and a pig (Mauricio) who, after suspecting that they will become the Christmas Eve dinner, escape from the farm where they were to embark on an unusual adventure.

On their way to the unknown they form a close friendship with an unusual iguana (Bilpo), who rescues them from various situations in which they get involved due to their inexperience in a new world of freedom. Suddenly, a ruthless poacher (the claw) who is engaged in the illegal practice of selling endangered animals, kidnaps Bilpo to sell it to a collector of exotic animals.

Our friends, driven by a sense of loyalty and gratitude to their partner follow his trail to the big city (Santo Domingo) where with a group of captured animals carry out the most daring and dangerous rescue operation.

== Cast ==
- Cuquín Victoria as Vinicio the Cat
- Kenny Grullón as Frank the chicken
- Roger Zayas as Enrique the goat
- Antonio Melenciano as the Hunter claw Méndez
- Frank Perozo as Larry and Juanchy
- Panky Saviñón as Harry and René
- Irving Alberti as Don Nicanor and Alfredo
- Memo Cortines as Bilpo the iguana
- Luís José Germán Mauricio the pig and Camilo alligator
- Giovanna Bonelly as Miss Jiménez
- Alejandro Alfonso as Sammy
- Carolina Rivas as Manuela
- Dominique Bonelly as Lucy
- Tony Rojas as Mr. Ruffini
