= List of A Love to Last episodes =

A Love to Last is a 2017 Philippine romantic, family drama television series directed by Jerry Lopez-Sineneng, starring Bea Alonzo, Ian Veneracion, and Iza Calzado with an ensemble cast. The series premiered on ABS-CBN's Primetime Bida evening block and worldwide on The Filipino Channel from January 9, 2017 to September 22, 2017 replacing Magpahanggang Wakas.

== Series overview ==
Season	Episodes	Originally released	
Season	Episodes	First released	Last released
1	83	January 9, 2017	May 5, 2017
2	100	May 8, 2017	September 22, 2017

== List of episodes ==
=== Chapter 1 ===
No. overall	No. in season	Title	Original release date	Kantar Media Ratings (Nationwide)	AGB Nielsen Ratings (NUTAM)
1	1	"World Premiere"	January 9, 2017	25.0%	17.8%
2	2	"May Mas Okay"	January 10, 2017	26.1%	17.6%
3	3	"Laban Lang"	January 11, 2017	24.2%	17.2%
4	4	"Move On Na"	January 12, 2017	27.8%	18.6%
5	5	"Simula Na"	January 13, 2017	26.5%	18.3%
6	6	"Ikaw Na, Girl"	January 16, 2017	23.0%	17.3%
7	7	"May Spark"	January 17, 2017	25.4%	18.9%
8	8	"Huli Ka"	January 18, 2017	26.8%	17.6%
9	9	"Para Paraan"	January 19, 2017	24.8%	18.6%
10	10	"Hello, Germany"	January 20, 2017	26.4%	18.8%
11	11	"Kilig"	January 23, 2017	18.5%	15.5%
12	12	"Maling Akala"	January 24, 2017	19.7%	12.9%
13	13	"Lean on Me"	January 25, 2017	18.5%	13.2%
14	14	"Best Day Ever"	January 26, 2017	17.2%	13.8%
15	15	"Secret Admirer"	January 27, 2017	17.8%	14.7%
16	16	"Surprise"	January 30, 2017	17.1%	14.2%
17	17	"Wrong Timing"	January 31, 2017	19.5%	14.3%
18	18	"Pagalingan"	February 1, 2017	18.3%	13.2%
19	19	"Getting There"	February 2, 2017	19.1%	13.9%
20	20	"Na-Fall"	February 3, 2017	18.1%	13.9%
21	21	"May Nagbabalik"	February 6, 2017	18.6%	13.7%
22	22	"Iwas"	February 7, 2017	19.2%	14.2%
23	23	"Meet Andeng"	February 8, 2017	18.0%	14.1%
24	24	"Caught"	February 9, 2017	17.3%	14.7%
25	25	"Chill Lang"	February 10, 2017	17.8%	13.8%
26	26	"Andeng Meets Grace"	February 13, 2017	17.2%	13.2%
27	27	"PasikLABan"	February 14, 2017	16.3%	12.6%
28	28	"Hot Seat"	February 15, 2017	16.5%	13.1%
29	29	"Misis Noble"	February 16, 2017	18.2%	13.8%
30	30	"Paghaharap"	February 17, 2017	17.5%	13.2%
31	31	"Yakap"	February 20, 2017	16.9%	13.5%
32	32	"Paandaran"	February 21, 2017	17.9%	13.6%
33	33	"Harapan"	February 22, 2017	16.8%	14.2%
34	34	"Sa Totoo Lang"	February 23, 2017	15.3%	14.0%
35	35	"Lost"	February 24, 2017	18.4%	14.3%
36	36	"Next Move"	February 27, 2017	16.5%	13.2%
37	37	"Galawan"	February 28, 2017	17.5%	13.3%
38	38	"Ano Ba Talaga?"	March 1, 2017	18.8%	14.5%
39	39	"Push Mo Na!"	March 2, 2017	17.9%	14.4%
40	40	"Ayan Tayo"	March 3, 2017	17.6%	13.6%
41	41	"Go For The Gold"	March 6, 2017	19.2%	14.6%
42	42	"Walang Susuko"	March 7, 2017	18.0%	13.8%
43	43	"Konti Na Lang"	March 8, 2017	17.9%	14.3%
44	44	"Eto Na Ata"	March 9, 2017	19.4%	15.4%
45	45	"It Is Official"	March 10, 2017	19.4%	14.5%
46	46	"Sila Na"	March 13, 2017	17.1%	TBA
47	47	"Secret Lovers"	March 14, 2017	18.4%	TBA
48	48	"Date Goals"	March 15, 2017	19.0%	TBA
49	49	"I'm Your Man"	March 16, 2017	18.4%	TBA
50	50	"Celebration"	March 17, 2017	18.2%	TBA
51	51	"Women's Instinct"	March 20, 2017	17.8%	TBA
52	52	"One Step Closer"	March 21, 2017	16.3%	TBA
53	53	"It's Time"	March 22, 2017	17.8%	TBA
54	54	"Laban For Love"	March 23, 2017	17.6%	TBA
55	55	"Tiwala Lang"	March 24, 2017	17.7%	TBA
56	56	"Your Love"	March 27, 2017	17.5%	7.1%
57	57	"Buking"	March 28, 2017	18.0%	7.1%
58	58	"The Truth"	March 29, 2017	16.0%	7.2%
59	59	"Todo Effort"	March 30, 2017	17.5%	7.8%
60	60	"Kapit Lang"	March 31, 2017	16.7%	7.4%
61	61	"Family Feud"	April 3, 2017	16.7%	6.4%
62	62	"Laban"	April 4, 2017	17.6%	7.0%
63	63	"Suspect"	April 5, 2017	17.3%	6.7%
64	64	"Threat"	April 6, 2017	19.0%	7.1%
65	65	"Be Our Guest"	April 7, 2017	17.0%	6.3%
66	66	"The In-laws"	April 10, 2017	16.6%	7.0%
67	67	"True Feelings"	April 11, 2017	15.7%	7.2%
68	68	"The Grand Debut"	April 12, 2017	17.2%	7.2%
69	69	"The Kiss"	April 17, 2017	16.7%	6.0%
70	70	"Palag Na"	April 18, 2017	18.0%	7.0%
71	71	"Ex-wife Problems"	April 19, 2017	16.5%	7.0%
72	72	"Struggle"	April 20, 2017	15.3%	6.6%
73	73	"Meet The Parents"	April 21, 2017	15.2%	6.0%
74	74	"Kaya Pa Ba?"	April 24, 2017	15.2%	6.0%
75	75	"Parent Trap"	April 25, 2017	16.9%	6.8%
76	76	"Family First"	April 26, 2017	14.6%	6.8%
77	77	"Wrecker"	April 27, 2017	15.7%	6.5%
78	78	"Laban Na!"	April 28, 2017	15.3%	6.6%
79	79	"Salpukan"	May 1, 2017	16.0%	6.0%
80	80	"Sagad"	May 2, 2017	17.9%	7.4%
81	81	"Atin Ang Gabi"	May 3, 2017	16.0%	6.4%
82	82	"Tonight Is The Night"	May 4, 2017	18.5%	7.1%
83	83	"The Big Moment"	May 5, 2017	18.1%	7.2%

=== Chapter 2 ===
No. overall	No. in season	Title	Original release date	Kantar Media Ratings (Nationwide)	AGB Nielsen Ratings (NUTAM People)
84	1	"Vow"	May 8, 2017	17.4%	6.7%
85	2	"Announcement"	May 9, 2017	17.4%	6.2%
86	3	"Competition"	May 10, 2017	17.3%	6.5%
87	4	"Approval"	May 11, 2017	17.5%	6.6%
88	5	"Never Give Up"	May 12, 2017	16.9%	6.1%
89	6	"Huli Ka"	May 15, 2017	16.6%	6.9%
90	7	"Clash of Plans"	May 16, 2017	20.5%	7.1%
91	8	"Ceasefire"	May 17, 2017	19.2%	6.9%
92	9	"Paranoid"	May 18, 2017	18.2%	7.6%
93	10	"Album Launch"	May 19, 2017	16.5%	7.0%
94	11	"Peligro"	May 22, 2017	19.8%	7.6%
95	12	"Big Disaster"	May 23, 2017	21.2%	7.8%
96	13	"Sisihan"	May 24, 2017	18.9%	7.9%
97	14	"Cold Treatment"	May 25, 2017	18.0%	7.4%
98	15	"Tuloy ang Laban"	May 26, 2017	18.2%	6.8%
99	16	"Selos"	May 29, 2017	17.8%	6.4%
100	17	"Meltdown"	May 30, 2017	18.4%	6.8%
101	18	"Hindi Paawat"	May 31, 2017	17.2%	7.2%
102	19	"Final Answer"	June 1, 2017	20.0%	8.5%
103	20	"Save the Date"	June 2, 2017	19.4%	7.4%
104	21	"The Prenup"	June 5, 2017	16.8%	6.8%
105	22	"Tarayan"	June 6, 2017	18.0%	6.6%
106	23	"Future Father-in-Law"	June 7, 2017	15.3%	5.9%
107	24	"Noble Doble Tension"	June 8, 2017	15.6%	5.6%
108	25	"Closure"	June 9, 2017	15.7%	6.4%
109	26	"Dilemma"	June 12, 2017	14.6%	5.5%
110	27	"Surprise"	June 13, 2017	16.5%	6.3%
111	28	"Party Party"	June 14, 2017	16.1%	6.1%
112	29	"The Night Before"	June 15, 2017	16.2%	7.1%
113	30	"The Wedding"	June 16, 2017	24.3%	8.8%
114	31	"Mr. and Mrs. Noble"	June 19, 2017	17.2%	6.9%
115	32	"The Reception"	June 20, 2017	20.1%	7.6%
116	33	"Wow Vows"	June 21, 2017	16.1%	6.2%
117	34	"The First Night"	June 22, 2017	17.7%	6.5%
118	35	"Two Become One"	June 23, 2017	18.9%	6.6%
119	36	"By Your Side"	June 26, 2017	16.0%	6.2%
120	37	"Moment of Truth"	June 27, 2017	16.6%	6.1%
121	38	"Welcome Home"	June 28, 2017	16.1%	6.3%
122	39	"Perfect Mrs. Noble"	June 29, 2017	16.6%	6.3%
123	40	"Major Adjustment"	June 30, 2017	15.7%	6.2%
124	41	"Tiwala"	July 3, 2017	17.0%	6.4%
125	42	"Follow the Rules"	July 4, 2017	17.9%	6.6%
126	43	"Goals"	July 5, 2017	16.7%	6.5%
127	44	"Family Bonding"	July 6, 2017	16.8%	6.4%
128	45	"Change of Heart"	July 7, 2017	16.8%	7.1%
129	46	"The Second Mom"	July 10, 2017	18.2%	6.8%
130	47	"Mommy Problems"	July 11, 2017	17.8%	7.0%
131	48	"Struggle is Real"	July 12, 2017	17.8%	6.7%
132	49	"The Good Wife"	July 13, 2017	16.0%	6.5%
133	50	"Take Over"	July 14, 2017	16.1%	5.9%
134	51	"Atribida"	July 17, 2017	16.8%	6.2%
135	52	"Change is Coming"	July 18, 2017	18.3%	6.3%
136	53	"Firsts"	July 19, 2017	17.1%	7.0%
137	54	"Grief"	July 20, 2017	16.0%	6.8%
138	55	"Defender"	July 21, 2017	17.9%	6.9%
139	56	"Trash Talk"	July 24, 2017	18.3%	7.4%
140	57	"Chaos"	July 25, 2017	18.5%	7.9%
141	58	"Ex Returns"	July 26, 2017	17.5%	6.7%
142	59	"Under the Table"	July 27, 2017	18.4%	7.2%
143	60	"Ayaw Patalo"	July 28, 2017	18.3%	6.9%
144	61	"Unwanted Guest"	July 31, 2017	18.0%	6.7%
145	62	"Hugot"	August 1, 2017	18.3%	7.6%
146	63	"Patago"	August 2, 2017	17.2%	6.7%
147	64	"Balak"	August 3, 2017	17.2%	7.0%
148	65	"Ayaw Paawat"	August 4, 2017	18.7%	6.9%
149	66	"Left Out"	August 7, 2017	16.2%	6.2%
150	67	"Stolen Moment"	August 8, 2017	17.2%	6.7%
151	68	"Secrets"	August 9, 2017	17.3%	6.8%
152	69	"Eksena"	August 10, 2017	18.0%	6.2%
153	70	"Gulo"	August 11, 2017	18.0%	6.7%
154	71	"Brainwash"	August 14, 2017	15.8%	5.9%
155	72	"Sukdulan"	August 15, 2017	17.5%	6.7%
156	73	"Galawan"	August 16, 2017	19.3%	7.3%
157	74	"LQ"	August 17, 2017	20.6%	7.6%
158	75	"Tragedy"	August 18, 2017	18.8%	7.3%
159	76	"I Am the Wife"	August 21, 2017	16.8%	6.2%
160	77	"Bakod"	August 22, 2017	18.0%	7.0%
161	78	"Habol ng Habol"	August 23, 2017	15.2%	6.5%
162	79	"Dagok"	August 24, 2017	16.6%	6.4%
163	80	"Baliktaran"	August 25, 2017	16.5%	6.6%
164	81	"Unwanted"	August 28, 2017	17.1%	7.1%
165	82	"Shaky"	August 29, 2017	18.8%	7.6%
166	83	"Mr. Buendia"	August 30, 2017	18.7%	6.3%
167	84	"Tug of War"	August 31, 2017	19.3%	6.5%
168	85	"Timpi"	September 1, 2017	18.2%	7.5%
169	86	"Leftovers"	September 4, 2017	16.8%	6.8%
170	87	"The Offer"	September 5, 2017	17.3%	7.0%
171	88	"Family Trials"	September 6, 2017	17.7%	7.2%
172	89	"Oportunista"	September 7, 2017	18.0%	6.9%
173	90	"Limelight"	September 8, 2017	20.8%	8.0%
174	91	"Boom"	September 11, 2017	15.7%	7.0%
175	92	"Fears"	September 12, 2017	17.6%	7.3%
176	93	"Retaliation"	September 13, 2017	18.9%	7.3%
177	94	"Sabog"	September 14, 2017	19.1%	7.5%
178	95	"Lamat"	September 15, 2017	18.9%	7.5%
179	96	"Hampas"	September 18, 2017	18.7%	7.1%
180	97	"Tagos"	September 19, 2017	19.9%	TBA
181	98	"Wasak"	September 20, 2017	22.4%	TBA
182	99	"Love Hurts"	September 21, 2017	21.0%	7.6%
183	100	"Lifetime"	September 22, 2017	25.0%	9.2%
