= Joshua Mintz =

Mexican TV executive (born 1965)

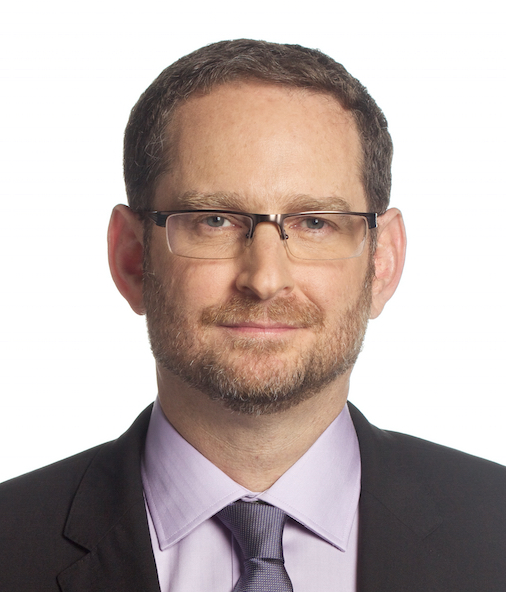
- Born: Joshua David Mintz; August 22, 1965 (age 61); Mexico City, Mexico
- Occupation: TV executive
- Years active: 1990-2022
- Spouse: Sarah Mintz (m. 2005)
- Children: 2

Joshua David Mintz (born August 22, 1965) is a Mexican TV executive.

Mintz has held leadership and production positions in the four most important Hispanic TV networks in the US and Mexico, having worked at Telemundo, Televisa, Univision and TV Azteca.

== Career ==
Mintz began his career at Televisa in various technical and production positions. He was appointed general director of Broadcasting Stations in 1990, where he was responsible for operating four national networks, two international networks and Televisa's cable system in Mexico City. He was later appointed general director of logistics of Televisa San Angel.

In 2000, Mintz joined Univision as director of drama production and participated in the design of their first novela studio in Miami. While at Univision, Mintz was executive producer of the Selena Vive! live special from Houston, TX, which became the highest-rated show in U.S. Hispanic television history at that time.

In 2006, Mintz joined Azteca America as director of Programming and shortly thereafter was promoted to director of Programming, Production and Operations.

He signed longtime Univision talk show host Cristina Saralegui for a new talk show on Telemundo, Pa'lante con Cristina. Under Mintz, Telemundo produced La Reina del Sur, a telenovela that premiered to more viewers than any other show in Telemundo history. The show's May 2011 season finale recorded the highest ratings in network history.

Under Mintz' supervision of content development, Telemundo delivered a record-breaking performance for five consecutive years since the 2010–2011 season, becoming the fastest growing Spanish-Language Broadcast Network in the United States, surpassing its main competitor by 2015 and even positioning itself as the number one Hispanic network in the country.

Following this role, Mintz served as executive vice president of scripted programming & general manager at Telemundo Television Studios, where he was responsible for all fiction and drama productions in the United States, Mexico and Colombia, as well as any new co-productions for Telemundo Media.

From 2016 through 2018, Mintz served as President of Production (fiction) of the Mexican network TV Azteca.

== Awards and nominations ==
In 2014, Mintz received three International Emmy® Award nominations for his telenovelas "Passion Prohibida", "La Patrona" and "El Señor de los Cielos". All three productions were nominated in the same category for best Non-English Language US Primetime Program. "El Señor de los Cielos" won Mintz the first-ever Emmy® award given in this category.

== Personal ==
Mintz is married to the Colombian actress, Sarah Mintz. They announced in December 2013 that they were expecting twins.
