= Valentina Buzzurro =

Mexican actress

- Born: 21 June 2000 (age 26); Agrigento, Sicily
- Occupation: Actress
- Years active: 2014–present

Valentina Buzzurro (born 21 June 2000) is an Italian-born Mexican actress. She is best known for playing the role of Gemma Corona in the Vencer franchise.

== Career ==
Buzzurro was born in Agrigento, Sicily to an Italian father and a Mexican mother. She moved to Mexico with her family when she was eight years old. During her childhood, she practiced artistic gymnastics and diving until she gave it up to begin her acting studies. At age eleven, she entered the CasAzul School of Performing Arts. She made her acting debut in the 2014 film, Viento aparte, directed by Alejandro Gerber Bicecci. That same year, she landed the role of Cinthia in the third and fourth seasons of El Señor de los Cielos. In 2018, she landed her second film role in El Ombligo de Guie'dani, directed by Xavi Sala. She has subsequently appeared in films such as Olimpia and Arritmia.

In 2020, Buzzurro landed the role of Elsa Agostini in the television series, Los pecados de Bárbara. Later that year, she was cast as in the telenovela Vencer el desamor, portraying Gemma Corona. She reprised the role in the telenovela, Vencer el pasado; both productions belong to the Vencer telenovela franchise. In 2022, Buzzurro participated in the film, Gringa, starring Steve Zahn and Judy Greer. In 2023, she appeared in Eternamente amándonos in the role of Blanca. In 2024, Buzzurro joined the cast of La historia de Juana, playing Margarita Bravo.

In 2025, Buzzurro was cast in Regalo de amor. In the telenovela, she portrayed Fedra de la Vega Mondragón, the main antagonist of the story. Her most recent role was Carolina Ferrara in Doc (2026).

== Filmography ==
Film roles
Year	Title	Role	Notes
2014	Viento aparte	Karina	
2018	El Ombligo de Guie'dani	Adriana	
2019	Olimpia	Judith	
2019	Arritmia	Ada	
2022	Gringa	Azusana	
2022	Malvada	Vampira	
2024	No corre el viento	Valentina	
2024	Tiempos furiosos	Isolda	

Television roles
Year	Title	Role	Notes
2015–2016	El Señor de los Cielos	Cinthia	24 episodes (seasons 3-4)
2018	Luis Miguel: la serie	Alessandra	
2020	Los pecados de Bárbara	Elsa Agostini Godinez	Main cast
2020	El candidato	Jimena	4 episodes
2020-2021	Vencer el desamor	Gemma Corona	Lead role
2021	La muchacha que limpia	La Nena	
2021	Vencer el pasado	Gemma Corona	Main cast
2022	El rey Vicente Fernández	Young Teresa Fernández Gómez	7 episodes
2023	Eternamente amándonos	Blanca Ortiz	
2023	Contra las cuerdas	Lucía	Main cast
2024	La historia de Juana	Margarita Bravo	Main cast
2025	Regalo de amor	Fedra de la Vega Mondragón	Main cast
2026	Doc	Carolina Ferrara	Main cast
2027	Te esperaba	Sofía Canseco	Lead role
