= María Remolá =

Spanish-Cuban operatic soprano (1930–2021)

María Remolá (7 December 1930 — 9 December 2021) was a Spanish-born Cuban operatic soprano. She was known for her coloratura soprano voice and was nicknamed "the Cuban Nightingale" (el Ruiseñor Cubano).

== Life and career ==
Remolá was born in 1930 in Barcelona. At the suggestion of an aunt of hers, who recognised her singing, she settled in Havana, Cuba in 1952 to pursue voice lessons, and later became a naturalised citizen. She studied under famed Cuban tenor Francisco Fernández Dominicis. She made her professional debut in 1958 with the Aguilá-Martelo company in the title role of Emilio Arrieta's opera Marina.

Remolá returned to Barcelona after decades of living in Cuba to spend time with her dying mother. She later settled in Santo Domingo, Dominican Republic and led a quiet life with teaching.

On 19 September 2010, an homage gala was held for her at the Sala Máximo Avilés Blonda, of the Palacio de Bellas Artes. In October 2011, she returned to Havana for an invitation by the UNEAC and the Ópera de la Calle.

Remolá spent her final years in a nursery home in Santo Domingo, where she died on 9 December 2021, two days after her 91st birthday.
