= Sarah Mintz =

Israeli-Colombian actress (born 1975)

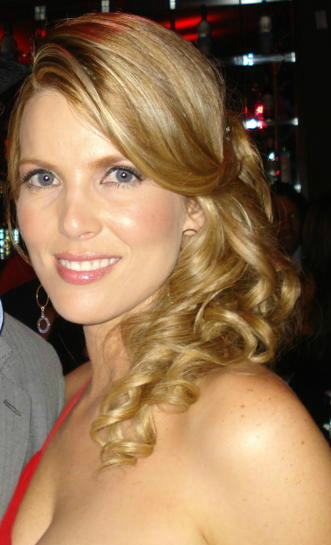
- Mintz in 2014
- Born: Maritza Rodríguez Gómez; September 1, 1975 (age 51); Barranquilla, Colombia
- Other name: Sarah Mintz
- Occupations: Actress; model
- Years active: 1996–2018
- Spouse: Joshua Mintz (m. 2005)
- Children: 2

Sarah Maritza Mintz, formerly Maritza Rodríguez Gómez (IPA: [maˈɾit.sa roˈðɾiɣez ˈɣomes]), (born September 1, 1975) is a retired Israeli-Colombian telenovela actress and model.

== Career ==
She is best known for her roles as Bárbara Santana in Telemundo’s telenovela Amantes del desierto (2001), Cristal Covarrubias in Venevisión's telenovela Ángel Rebelde (2003), as Marfil Mondragon de Irázabal; Deborah Mondragón de Dávila in Venevisión's telenovela Acorralada (2007), Sarah Andrade in Telemundo's telenovela El Rostro de Analía (2008), Pilar and Raquel Arismendi in Telemundo's telenovela La Casa de al Lado (2011), Antonia Villarroel in Telemundo's telenovela El Rostro de la Venganza (2012), Teresa Cristina Palmer in Telemundo's telenovela Marido En Alquiler (2013), and Silvana Rivapalacios in Telemundo's telenovela Silvana sin lana (2016).

== Personal life ==
Mintz has three siblings. She speaks English and Spanish. She has been married since June 2005 to Jewish Mexican TV executive Joshua Mintz. Mintz announced on November 11, 2013 on Telemundo's Al Rojo Vivo that she and her husband were expecting twins. On April 13, 2014, she gave birth to twin boys, Akiva and Yehuda.

In January 2018, she announced that she had converted to Judaism and that she changed her name to Sarah Mintz.

In 2021, she moved with her family to Jerusalem, Israel.

== Filmography ==
=== Film ===
Year	Title	Role
2000	Vuelo 1503	Actress

=== Television ===
Year	Title	Role
1995	Mascarada	
1997	Perfume de agonía	Carmen
1997	La mujer en el espejo	
1997	Dios se lo pague	Irene Richardson
1999	Marido y mujer	Lucía Méndez
2000	La revancha	Mercedes Riverol
2001	Amantes del desierto	Bárbara Santana
2002	Milagros de amor	Milagros viuda de amor
2004	Ángel Rebelde	Cristal Covarrubias
2005	Vuelo 1503	Ángela Granda
2007	Acorralada	Débora Mondragón de Davila / Marfil Mondragón de Irazábal
2007-2008	Pecados Ajenos	Karen Vallejo
2008	Doña Bárbara	Asunción Vergel de Luzardo
2008-2009	El Rostro de Analía	Sarah Andrade
2010	Perro amor	Camila Brando de Cáceres
2011-2012	La casa de al lado	Pilar Arismendi Fisterra de Ruiz / Raquel Arismendi Fisterra
2012	El rostro de la venganza	Antonia Villarroel
2013	Rafael Orozco, el ídolo	Marta Mónica Camargo
2013-2014	Marido en alquiler	Teresa Cristina Palmer Silva de Ibarra
2015-2016	El Señor de los Cielos	Amparo Rojas
2016-2017	Silvana sin lana	Silvana "Chivis" Rivapalacios Altamirano de Villaseñor
2022-2023	Secretos de villanas	Herself (Main cast)

== Awards and nominations ==
Year	Award	Category	Telenovela or series	Result
2003	Premios India Catalina	Outstanding Lead Actress Telenovela	Milagros de amor	Nominated
2002	Premios India Catalina	Outstanding Lead Actress Telenovela	Amantes del desierto	Won
2000	Premios India Catalina	Outstanding Lead Actress Telenovela	Marido y mujer	Nominated
2003	Premios TVyNovelas	Outstanding Lead Actress Telenovela	Milagros de amor	Won
2002	Premios TVyNovelas	Outstanding Lead Actress Telenovela	Amantes del desierto	Nominated
2000	Premios TVyNovelas	Outstanding Lead Actress Telenovela	Marido y Mujer	Nominated
2011	Miami Life Awards	Best Villain of Telenovela	Perro Amor	Won
2012	Premios People en Español	Best Actress	El Rostro de la Venganza	Nominated
2012	Miami Life Awards	Telenovela Best Female Lead	La Casa de al Lado	Nominated
2012	Premios tu mundo 2012	Favorite Lead Actress	La Casa de al Lado	Won
2012	Premios tu mundo 2012	The Best Bad Girl	La Casa de al Lado	Nominated
2013	Premios 2013	Favorite TV Villain	Rafael Orozco, el ídolo	Won
2013	Premios tu mundo 2013	The Perfect Couple with David Chocarro	El Rostro de la Venganza	Nominated
2013	Premios People en Español 2013	Best Female Antagonist	Marido en Alquiler	Won
2017	Miami Life Awards	Best Female Lead in a Telenovela	Silvana sin lana	Nominated
