= Nickelodeon Records discography =

This is a list of albums released by Nickelodeon Records or music released by Nickelodeon through its partnership with Republic Records, including studio albums, extended plays, soundtrack albums, compilation albums, video albums, and remix albums.

This list does not include oldies compilations released under the Nick@Nite brand.

== Albums (1990s) ==
Year	Artist(s)	Album	Released	Type
1993	Ren & Stimpy	You Eediot!	August 31	Soundtrack
1993	Ren & Stimpy	Ren & Stimpy's Crock O' Christmas	September 21	Soundtrack
1995	Ren & Stimpy	Radio Daze	September 19	Soundtrack
1996	Allegra's Window	Shake Your Doodles: Allegra's Favorite Songs	March 26	Soundtrack
1996	Gullah Gullah Island	Jump Up and Sing: Binyah Binyah's Favorite Songs	March 26	Soundtrack
1996	Various artists	All That: The Album	November 26	Soundtrack
1998	Rugrats	The Rugrats Movie: Music From the Motion Picture	November 3	Soundtrack
1999	Blue's Clues	Blue's Big Treasure: A Musical Adventure	February 16	Soundtrack
1999	Blue's Clues	Goodnight Blue: A Nighttime Musical Adventure	November 2	Soundtrack

== Albums (2000s) ==
Year	Artist(s)	Album	Released	Type
2000	Blue's Clues	A Playdate with Blue: A Playtime Musical Adventure	March 14	Soundtrack
2000	Rugrats	Rugrats in Paris: Music from the Motion Picture	November 7	Soundtrack
2001	SpongeBob SquarePants	Original Theme Highlights	August 14	EP
2001	Jimmy Neutron	Jimmy Neutron: Boy Genius: Music from the Motion Picture	November 20	Soundtrack
2002	The Wild Thornberrys	The Wild Thornberrys Movie: Music from the Motion Picture	November 26	Soundtrack
2002	Taina cast	Original Soundtrack Album	February 19	Soundtrack
2003				Soundtrack
2003	ChalkZone	In the Zone	February 4	Soundtrack
2003	The Rugrats cast	Rugrats Go Wild: Music from the Motion Picture	June 10	Soundtrack
2004				Soundtrack
2004	Dora the Explorer	Music from the TV Series	September 28	Soundtrack
2004	Rugrats	Holiday Classics	October 12	Soundtrack
2004	SpongeBob SquarePants cast	The SpongeBob SquarePants Movie - Music from the Movie and More...	November 9	Soundtrack
2005	Various artists	Drake & Josh	March 8	Soundtrack
2005	The Backyardigans	The Best of Season 1	July 12	Soundtrack
2005	Dora the Explorer	Dance Fiesta!	October 10	Soundtrack
2005	SpongeBob SquarePants	The Yellow Album	November 15	Soundtrack
2006	Various artists	Music Mix	March 7	Soundtrack
2006	Dora the Explorer and Go, Diego, Go!	Dora, Diego & Friends' Animal Jamboree	April 4	Soundtrack
2006	The Backyardigans	Groove to the Music	July 11	Soundtrack
2006	Blue's Clues	Blue's Biggest Hits	August 22	Soundtrack
2006	SpongeBob SquarePants	The Best Day Ever	September 12	Soundtrack
2006	Dora the Explorer	World Adventure	September 26	Soundtrack
2006	Jack's Big Music Show	Season One	September 26	Soundtrack
2006	Dora the Explorer, The Backyardigans, Wonder Pets! and Go, Diego, Go!	Nick Jr. Winter Wonderland	October 3	Compilation Album
2007	Go, Diego, Go!	Go, Diego, Go! The Live Musical!: The Great Jaguar Rescue	March 27	Live album
2007	Wonder Pets!	Season 1 Highlights	April 10	Soundtrack
2008	The Backyardigans	Born to Play	January 22	Soundtrack
2008	Miranda Cosgrove & Drake Bell	Merry Christmas, Drake & Josh		Soundtrack
2008	iCarly cast	Original Soundtrack Album	June 10	Soundtrack
2008	Dora the Explorer	Party Favorites	September 9	Soundtrack
2009	Spectacular! cast	Spectacular: Music From The Series!	February 3	Soundtrack
2009	SpongeBob SquarePants	SpongeBob's Greatest Hits	July 14	Compilation album
2009	Dora the Explorer	Dora's Christmas	November 3	Soundtrack

== Albums (2010s) ==
Year	Artist(s)	Album	Released	Type
2010	Dora the Explorer	We Did It!: Dora's Greatest Hits	August 17	Compilation album
2010	Big Time Rush	BTR	October 11	Studio album
2010	Big Time Rush	Live in Concert: The Walmart Soundcheck	November 8	Live album
2010	Big Time Rush	Best of Season 1	November 26	Compilation album
2010	Big Time Rush	Holiday Bundle	November 30	EP
2011	SpongeBob SquarePants cast	BOBmusik - Das gelbe Album	March 11	Soundtrack
2011	Victorious cast	Music from the Hit TV Show	August 2	Soundtrack
2011	Big Time Rush	Elevate	November 21	Studio album
2012	iCarly cast	The Best of Season 2: Soundtrack II	January 24	Soundtrack
2012	The Fresh Beat Band	Music from the Hit TV Show	January 31	Soundtrack
2012	Big Time Rush	Big Time Movie: The Original Motion Picture Soundtrack	March 6	EP
2012	Rags cast	Rags: The Original Motion Picture Soundtrack	May 22	Soundtrack
2012	Victorious cast	Season 2.0: More Music from the Hit TV Show	June 5	Soundtrack
2012	EME15	The Debut Album	June 26	Studio album
2012	Winx Club (ft. Elizabeth Gillies)	We Are Believix	July 28	Soundtrack
2012	The Fresh Beat Band	Vol. 2.0: More Music from the Hit TV Show	October 16	Soundtrack
2012	Teenage Mutant Ninja Turtles (2012 TV series)	Theme Song	October 23	Single
2012	Victorious cast	Season 3.0: Even More Music from the Hit TV Show	November 6	EP
2012	SpongeBob SquarePants	It's a SpongeBob Christmas! Album	November 6	Soundtrack
2012	EME15	EME15 (Navidad edition)	November 13	Compilation album
2012	Nickelodeon cast	Merry Nickmas	November 19	Compilation album
2013	Dora the Explorer	Dora Rocks!: Music from the Special & More!	April 2	Soundtrack
2013	EME15	Wonderland Live: Zona Preferente	April 30	Live album
2013	Big Time Rush	24/Seven	June 11	Studio album
2013	The Legend of Korra	Original Music from Book One	July 16	Soundtrack
2013	Big Time Rush	Elevation	August 6	Video album
2014	Michael Corcoran (Musician)	Just Fine (Sam & Cat Theme Song)	March 25	Single
2015	SpongeBob SquarePants	The SpongeBob Movie: Sponge Out of Water	January 27	Soundtrack; Extended play
2017	Yo Soy Franky cast	Música Original de la Serie	May 12	Soundtrack
2018	PAW Patrol	Official Theme Song & More	July 26	EP
2019	Henry Danger	The Musical (Original Soundtrack)	July 19	Soundtrack
2019	Blaze and the Monster Machines	Rockin’ Ride-Along Songs	August 11	Soundtrack
2019	Bubble Guppies	Bubble Bops!	September 27	Soundtrack
2019	Blue's Clues & You!	Theme Song	November 1	Single
2019	The Casagrandes	Theme Song	November 15	Single

== Albums (2020s) ==
Year	Artist(s)	Album	Released	Type
2020	Shimmer and Shine	Groove Zahramay!	February 7	Soundtrack
2020	The Loud House	Really Loud Music	April 10	Soundtrack
2020	The Loud House	Theme & End Credit	May 4	Single
2020	Danger Force	Theme Song & This Gas Will Pass	May 8	Single
2020	Rise of the Teenage Mutant Ninja Turtles	Main Title	May 8	Single
2020	It's Pony	Theme Song	May 21	Single
2020	Noggin	Let's Dance	May 29	Soundtrack
2020	Sunny Day	Keep Styling, Keep Singing, Volume 1	May 29	Soundtrack
2020	Sunny Day	Keep Styling, Keep Singing, Volume 2	June 19	Soundtrack
2020	Blue's Clues & You!	Blue's Sing-Along Spectacular	July 3	Soundtrack
2020	Top Wing	Theme Song	July 17	Single
2020	Butterbean's Café	Butterbean's Fairy Best Songs	July 24	EP
2020	Santiago of the Seas	Santiago's Sea Shanties	October 9	Soundtrack
2020	Side Hustle	We Got This (Theme Song)	October 27	Single
2020	Joseph Trapanese	Are You Afraid of the Dark? (Original Music from Season 1)	October 30	Soundtrack
2020	Nick Jr. Channel	Holly Jolly Jams	December 11	Soundtrack
2021	Blaze and the Monster Machines	Rockin’ Ride-Along Songs, Volume 2	January 29	Soundtrack
2021	Blaze and the Monster Machines	Rockin’ Ride-Along Songs, Volume 3	January 29	Soundtrack
2021	Side Hustle	Be You	February 13	Single
2021	The Loud House	Mega Music Countdown	February 16	Soundtrack
2021	Noggin	Rhymes Through Times	March 5	EP
2021	SpongeBob SquarePants	The SpongeBob Movie: Sponge On The Run (Original Motion Picture Soundtrack)	March 5	Soundtrack
2021	Kamp Koral	Theme Song	April 2	Single
2021	Nick Jr. Channel	Dance, Shake & Shimmy with Nick Jr.	April 6	Soundtrack
2021	The Barbarian and the Troll	A Bard's Knock Life: Original Music, Vol. 1	June 25	Soundtrack
2021	Nickelodeon	Mega Music Fest 2021 Album	July 16	Soundtrack
2021	The Loud House	The Loud House Movie (Original Motion Picture Soundtrack)	August 20	Soundtrack
2021	The Loud House	The Loud House Movie (Original Motion Picture Score)	September 24	Soundtrack
2021	Noggin	Big Heart Beats	September 24	Soundtrack
2021	Nick Jr. Channel	The Always Song	October 15	Single
2021	Noggin	Noggin Knows: Songs About the Earth	November 1	Soundtrack
2021	Noggin	Noggin Knows: Songs About the United States	November 1	Soundtrack
2021	It's Pony	The Best of Season 1	November 11	Soundtrack
2021	Nickelodeon	That Girl Lay Lay (Theme Song)	November 11	Single
2021	The Loud House	A Loud House Christmas	November 25	Soundtrack
2021	The Astronauts	Original Music from the Series	December 17	Soundtrack
2021	Wallykazam!	Rock N' Troll, Vol. 1	December 17	Soundtrack
2022	Noggin	What's the Word?	January 14	Soundtrack
2022	Star Trek Prodigy	Original Music from the Series	January 14	Soundtrack
2022	Big Nate	The Theme Song	February 18	Single
2022	Big Nate	The Butt Cheeks Song	February 18	Single
2022	Nick Jr. Channel	Sing, Dance & Sway the Nick Jr. Way	April 8	Soundtrack
2022	Rugrats	Rescuing Cynthia	April 15	Single
2022	Side Hustle	Worlds Collide	April 22	Single
2022	Middlemost Post	Theme Song (Rozwell Kid Remix)	April 29	Single
2022	Middlemost Post	Theme Song (AJJ Remix)	April 29	Single
2022	Middlemost Post	Same Ol Same/Dope Dope New Song	April 29	Single
2022	Middlemost Post	Theme Song (Kimya Dawson Remix)	April 29	Single
2022	It's Pony	The Best of Season 2	May 26	Soundtrack
2022	Blue's Clues & You!	Nursery Rhymes, Vol. 1	June 10	Soundtrack
2022	Noggin	Rhymes Through Times, Vol. 2	June 19	EP
2022	Santiago of the Seas	Santiago’s Sea Shanties, Vol. 2	August 19	Soundtrack
2022	Danger Force	Fightin' Crimes, Spittin' Rhymes	September 14	Soundtrack
2022	Blue's Clues & You!	Nursery Rhymes, Vol. 2	September 23	Soundtrack
2022	Blue's Clues & You!	On Our Way (Original Song from the Motion Picture)	October 7	Single
2022	Noggin	Meet The AlphaBeats: Original Soundtrack Album	October 14	Soundtrack
2022	Nick Jr. Channel	Fun Fiesta!	October 21	EP
2022	Blue's Clues & You!	That's My Song (Original Song from the Motion Picture)	November 11	Single
2022	Nick Jr. Channel	Winter Wonder Jams	November 11	Soundtrack
2022	Blue's Clues & You!	Blue's Big City Adventure: The Original Motion Picture Soundtrack	November 18	Soundtrack
2022	Blue's Clues & You!	Nursery Rhymes Vol. 3	December 2	Soundtrack
2022	That Girl Lay Lay	That Girl Lay Lay (Music From Season 1)	December 9	Soundtrack
2022	Nick Jr. Channel	The Remixes Vol. 1: Holiday Hits	December 23	Soundtrack
2023	The Fairly OddParents	Fairly Odd Bops	January 20	Soundtrack
2023	School of Rock	School of Rock (Original Music from the Series)	January 27	Soundtrack
2023	Blue's Clues & You!	Nursery Rhymes Vol. 4	February 17	Soundtrack
2023	Noggin	Noggin Knows: Songs About Big Questions	March 10	Soundtrack
2023	The Really Loud House	Best of Season 1	March 24	Soundtrack
2023	Rubble & Crew	Theme Song	March 24	Single
2023	Rocko's Modern Life	Original Music from the Series	April 7	Soundtrack
2023	Bossy Bear	Official Theme Song	April 14	Single
2023	Erin & Aaron	Theme Song & More!	April 28	Single
2023	Rugrats	Music from Season 1	May 19	Soundtrack
2023	Kamp Koral	Music from the Series	June 2	Soundtrack
2023	Bubble Guppies	Bubble Bops Vol. 2!	June 16	Soundtrack
2023	Blue's Clues & You!	Nursery Rhymes Vol. 5	June 23	Soundtrack
2023	Big Nate	Music from Season 1	July 7	Soundtrack
2023	Nick Jr. Channel	Nick Jr. The Remixes Vol. 3 Spring Into Dance (Remix)	July 14	Soundtrack
2023	The Fairly OddParents	Fairly Odd Bops Vol. 2	July 28	Soundtrack
2023	Bryson Tiller	Down Like That	September 8	Single
2023	Mckenna Grace; Blackbear	Bark to the Beat	September 15	Single
2023	Rocko's Modern Life	Original Music from the Series: 30th Anniversary Edition	September 18	Soundtrack
2023	Christina Aguilera	Learning to Fly	September 22	Single
2023	Pinar Toprak	PAW Patrol: The Mighty Movie: Original Motion Picture Soundtrack	September 29	Soundtrack
2023	Nick Jr. Channel	Mix It Up! The Remixes Vol. 4: Balla Balla	October 13	Soundtrack
2023	Jeremy Zuckerman	Avatar: The Last Airbender – Book 1: Water (Music from the Animated Series)	November 17	Soundtrack
2023	Blaze and the Monster Machines	Rockin’ Ride-Along Songs, Volume 4	December 21	Soundtrack
2024	Bubble Guppies	Bubble Bops Vol. 3!	March 1	Soundtrack
2024	Bubble Guppies	Bubble Bops Vol. 4!	August 16	Soundtrack
2024	Blaze and the Monster Machines	Rockin' Ride-Along Songs Volume 5	August 23	Soundtrack
2024	Bubble Guppies	Bubble Bops Vol. 5!	October 18	
