= Macarena Achaga =

Argentine actress and singer (born 1992)

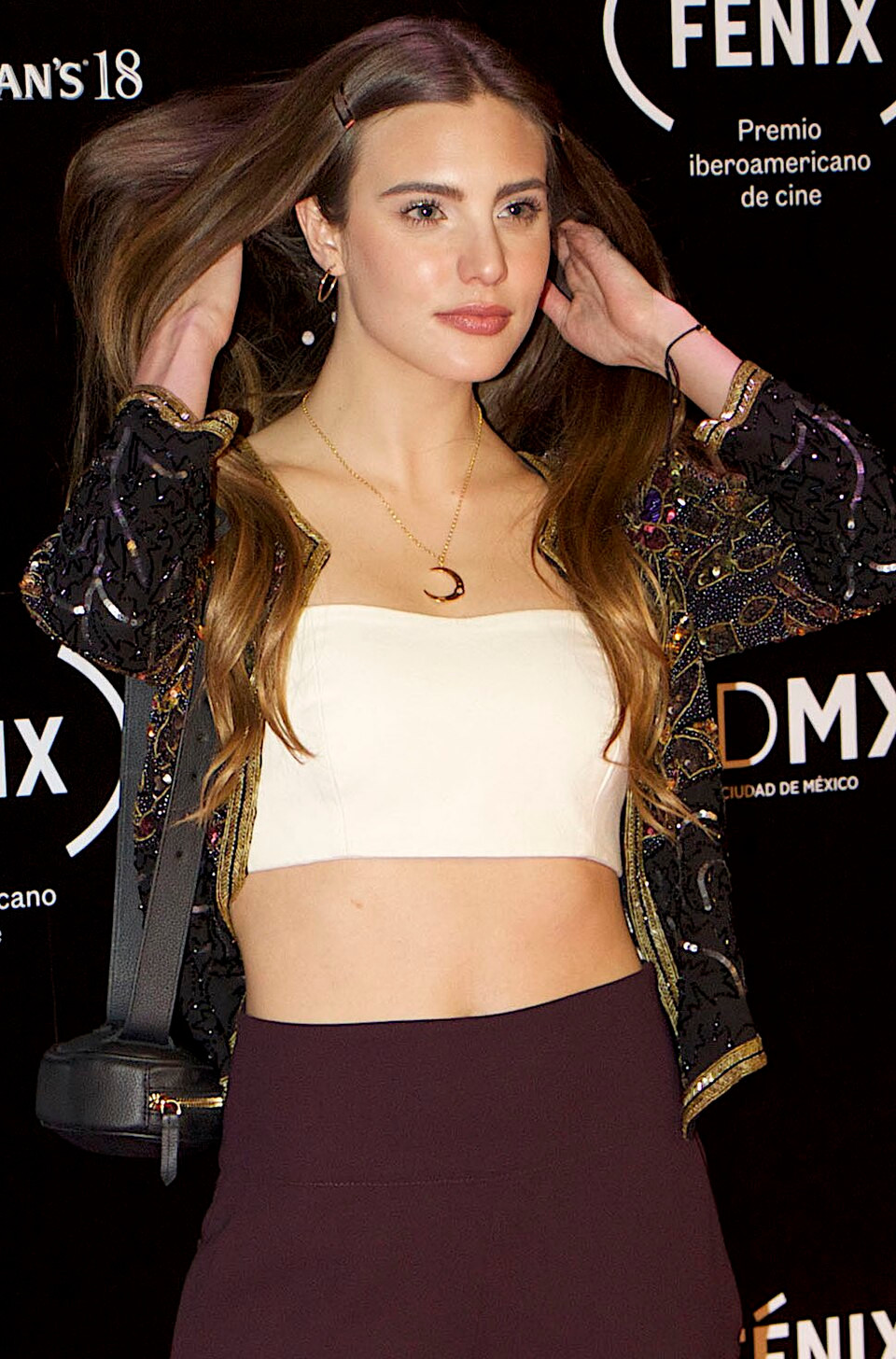
- Achaga in 2018

Background information
- Born: Macarena Achaga Figueroa; March 5, 1992 (age 34); Mar del Plata, Argentina
- Origin: Buenos Aires, Argentina
- Occupations: Model; actress; singer; television hostess
- Instruments: Guitar; vocals
- Years active: 2007–present
- Label: Warner Music México
- Formerly of: Eme 15

Macarena Achaga Figueroa (Spanish pronunciation: [makaˈɾena aˈtʃaɣa]; born March 5, 1992), known professionally as Macarena Achaga, is an Argentine model, actress, singer, and television hostess. In 2012, she debuted as an actress on the Mexican television series Miss XV and was a member of the Mexican-Argentine pop group, Eme 15, from 2011 to 2014. She is also best known for portraying the character Valentina Carvajal in the television series Love to Death.

== Early life ==
Macarena Achaga Figueroa was born in Mar del Plata, Argentina. Her parents are architects. She is the oldest child and has a brother named Santiago, who is eight years younger. At 15, Achaga began her career as a model, travelling up to five hours every week by bus from Mar del Plata to Buenos Aires for jobs. She signed with Pink Model Management in Buenos Aires and later signed with Mulittalent Agency, also located in Buenos Aires. At 18, she moved to Buenos Aires to further pursue her modeling career.

== Modeling career ==
Achaga began her career at 15 as a print model with Pink Models Management based in Buenos Aires. She later entered into a contract with Multitalent Agency, also in Buenos Aires. She has modeled for various Argentine clothing brands including Sweet Victorians, Doll Fins and Muaaa. Other modeling work included a 2010 commercial for Marinela cookies, and appearances in the magazines ParaTeens, Código Teen, Joy and Para Ti in 2011. At 18, she worked briefly in modelling jobs in Mexico and France. In August 2009, she did editorial work for Cosmopolitan Argentina and appeared in the Spring/Summer 2012 print campaign for handbags for the brand CLOĒ in Mexico. In August 2011 and 2013, she appeared in an editorial for InStyle Mexico.

In October 2013, she appeared in a breast cancer awareness ad campaign in Mexico for Tommy Hilfiger handbags. She also appeared in a web mini-series ad for Nescafé Dolce Cafe, promoting the brand alongside Gossip Girl: Acapulco in Mexico. Achaga appeared on the cover and in an editorial spread modeling bridal dresses for Hola magazine's special "Novias" edition in November 2014.

In October 2015, Achaga and actor Gonzalo Garcia Vivanco appeared in an autumn print campaign for Banana Republic in Mexico.

== Television career ==
=== Early career ===
Achaga's first television job was co-hosting the Argentine version of the MTV Latin America music show Los 10+ Pedidos with Gabo Ramos in 2010. She left the show in 2011, following her casting in the Nickelodeon Latin America and Canal 5 television series Miss XV.

=== 2011 to 2013 ===
Achaga continued working as a model in Mexico throughout 2011. In June 2011, she was in Mexico City attending workshop at Televisa San Ángel, where she was spotted by producer, Pedro Damián, in the cafeteria. Damián invited her to audition for Miss XV, the network's new tween-oriented musical television series. Achaga was one of eight actresses considered in the final castings for the role of the antagonist, "Leonora". In August 2011, Achaga was confirmed as the female antagonist, "Leonora Martínez", for Miss XV. Achaga is the only Argentine cast member in the ensemble. Filming for the television series required Achaga to make the permanent move to Mexico City where production on the show lasted from October 2011 to June 2012. The show premiered on Nickelodeon Latin America on April 16, 2012. On Canal 5, the show began airing episodes on May 14, 2012, for Latin America. In spite of its success in Mexico, the show was not renewed for a second season.

In January 2013, Achaga was officially confirmed as "Jenny Parra" in Gossip Girl: Acapulco, the Mexican remake of the hit United States television show, Gossip Girl. In order to be cast on the show, co-producer Andrés Tovar, required Achaga to get rid of her Argentine accent by taking speech lessons in order to more accurately portray a Mexican character. Mexican producer Pedro Torres co-produced the show along with a collaboration from Warner Channel International and Mexican production agency El Mall. Filming for the series began in late January in Acapulco, Mexico and ended in May 2013. The show premiered on August 5, 2013, for the channel Golden Premiere in Mexico. The series began airing on the Mexican television stations Telehit in September; it aired in the U.S. on UniMas. It began airing on Canal 5 on November 11, 2013. On January 14, 2014, producer Pedro Torres announced that Gossip Girl: Acapulco was cancelled. In July 2013, Achaga filmed El Librito Rojo, a short film in which she stars as the protagonist, in Guanajuato, Mexico. Filming was conducted in two days.

=== 2014 to 2015 ===
In January 2014, she filmed Páginas Negras, a horror themed television series starring Alfonso Herrera in Buenos Aires. A trailer for the show was released on Vimeo in July of that same year. A release date has not been set, but it is slated to air on the Argentine network, Space in Latin America. She filmed a role in the critically acclaimed Peruvian drama film, Magallanes, in 2014. The film later screened internationally, and is scheduled for a showing at the Miami International Film Festival on March 13, 2016. In late March 2014, Achaga traveled to Pucón, Chile to begin rehearsals for Sitiados, a new historical drama television series co-produced by the Chilean network TVN and FOX International Channels. Set from 1598 to 1601, the series is inspired by the true account of a group of Mapuche who held 500 Spanish prisoners in Villarrica, Chile during the Arauco War. Production began on April 8, 2014 in Pucón. Filming concluded in July 2014 after nearly four months. The series premiered exclusively on May 2, 2015 on the subscription service, FOXPlay+, in Latin America. One week later, it premiered on television on Fox Latin America on May 10, 2015.

From October 2014 to April 2015, she filmed the third season of the Fox Latin America television musical drama, Cumbia Ninja, in Bogotá, Colombia. The third and final season of Cumbia Ninja, consisting of 17 episodes, premiered in Latin America on October 29, 2015 for Fox Latin America. In early October 2015, Achaga travelled to Lima, Peru to begin filming the television drama, El regreso de Lucas. The show is a collaboration produced by both the Argentine network, Telefe and the Peruvian network, América Televisión. A total of 60 episodes were filmed. The show premiered on November 9, 2016 in Peru.

=== 2016 to present ===
In mid-2016, Achaga returned to Mexico City and began filming the television show, La piloto, which later aired in 2017. The first season has 80 episodes which aired on Univision in the US.

In July 2017, Achaga was cast in the television drama series, La bella y las bestias, which began filming in Mexico City for three months. The show will have 80 episodes and is expected to air sometime in 2018.

La piloto was renewed for a second season and filming began in late January 2018. Achaga suffered a knee injury and later left the show; her role of Olivia in the series was recast and Achaga was replaced by Mexican actress, Oka Giner, her former Gossip Girl: Acapulco co-star. In November 2018 she began to play the role of Valentina Carvajal in Amar a muerte. The storyline features a lesbian relationship between Valentina and Juliana Valdés, played by actress Bárbara López. The couple, nicknamed "Juliantina", quickly grew to a worldwide audience. It was the first significant lesbian storyline in the history of prime time Mexican television, channel Televisa. In 2019, it was announced that a spin off series and film are due to be made.

== Music career ==
=== Eme 15 ===
In the summer of 2011, Macarena attended the final castings for Miss XV in Mexico City. Originally, the producers were not looking for a sixth member, but decided to hold a casting search in July 2011 to find a third female member. In August 2011, she was confirmed as the cast's final female member. As a member of the ensemble cast, Macarena also joined the pop group Eme 15 as the sixth and final band member. The remaining five members were Paulina Goto, Elezar Gómez, Natasha Dupeyrón, Yago Muñoz, and Jack Duarte. The band released their first music video, "Wonderland", on April 4, 2012. The video was filmed in October 2011 at Las Pozas, a garden in Xilitla, San Luis Potosí. "Wonderland" was officially released for digital download on iTunes in Mexico on April 24, 2012.

The band separated following their final concert on January 5, 2014, in Acapulco, Mexico.

== Personal life ==
Following her casting in Miss XV in August 2011, Achaga moved to Mexico City where she currently resides. In March 2013, she became a vegetarian. Achaga's relationship with Mexican actor, Sebastian Zurita, was confirmed in February 2014. The couple separated at the end of 2014.

She met Juanpa Zurita on set while shooting Luis Miguel: La Serie 2 and confirmed a romantic relationship with him in 2021.

== Filmography ==
Film roles
Year	Title	Role	Notes
2013	El librito rojo	Hippie	Short film
2017	Ciclos (Cycles)	Sofía	Short film
2019	En las buenas y en las malas	Pamela	
2022	Father of the Bride	Julieta Castillo	Released June 16, 2022
2022	The wrath of God	Luciana B	Released 2022 Netflix

Television roles
Year	Title	Role	Notes
2012	Miss XV	Leonora Martínez	Recurring role
2013	Gossip Girl: Acapulco	Jenny Parra	Recurring role; 26 episodes
2015	Sitiados	Rocío de Salas	Recurring role (season 1); 8 episodes
2015	Cumbia Ninja	Rocio	Recurring role (season 3); 13 episodes
2016–2017	El regreso de Lucas	Catalina Díaz Ayala	Recurring role; 58 episodes
2017–2018	La Piloto	Olivia Nieves	Series regular (season 1–2); 82 episodes
2017	La doble vida de Estela Carrillo	Olivia Nieves	Episode: "Final: Part 2"
2018	La bella y las bestias	Emilia Quintero	Main role; 66 episodes
2018–2019	Amar a muerte	Valentina Carvajal	Main role; 88 episodes
2019	Juliantina	Valentina Carvajal	Main role; 19 episodes
2021	Luis Miguel: The Series	Michelle Salas	Main role (seasons 2–3), 8 episodes
2022	Travesuras de la niña mala	Arlette	Main role
2026	Colisión	Zoé	Main role

== Discography ==
=== Singles ===
Year	Single	Peak chart positions		Album
Year	Single	MEX	US	Album
2012	"Wonderland"	10	—	Eme 15
2012	"Solamente Tú"	—	—	Eme 15
2013	"Diferente"	—	—	Wonderland-Zona Preferente
"—" denotes releases that did not chart or not released to that country

=== Music videos ===
Year	Music Video	Artist
2012	"Wonderland"	Eme 15
2012	"Solamente tú"	Eme 15
2013	"Diferente" (Live from the Auditorio Nacional)	Eme 15
2013	"Baila"	Eme 15
2013	"Muévete con Chester Cheetos" campaign	Eme 15
2015	"Tú"	Jary
2015	"Bajo el agua"	Manuel Medrano
2016	"Química"	Reyno
2021	"Ropa Cara"	Camilo Echeverry
