= Paulina Goto =

Mexican singer and actress (born 1991)

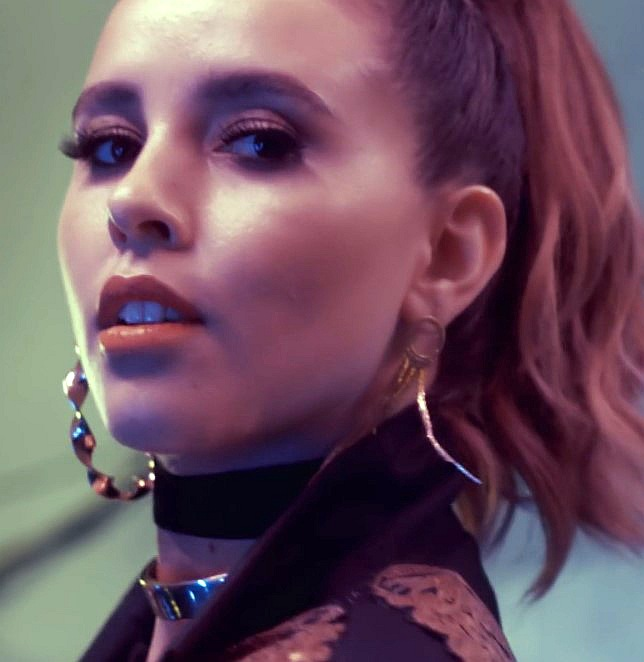
- Goto in 2018
- Born: Paulina Gómez Torres; 29 July 1991 (age 34); Monterrey, Nuevo León, Mexico
- Occupations: Singer; actress
- Years active: 2008–present
- Musical career
- Genres: Pop; dance-pop; soft rock; pop rock
- Instrument: Vocals
- Labels: Sony BMG; Warner; Empire
- Website: www.paulinagoto.com.mx

Paulina Gómez Torres (born 29 July 1991), known professionally as Paulina Goto, is a Mexican pop singer and actress. She first gained popularity for her debut role in the Mexican telenovela Niña de mi Corazón in 2010. She was a member of the popular Mexican-Argentine pop group Eme 15, formed by producer Pedro Damián, from 2011 to 2014. She is also known for her roles in Mi corazón es tuyo (2014-2015), Un camino hacia el destino (2016), El vuelo de la Victoria (2017) and Daughter From Another Mother (2021).

== Early life ==
Paulina Goto was born in Monterrey, Mexico. She has one younger brother named Eduardo. Her mother and maternal grandmother are both psychologists. Her father was a singer and musician who often co-wrote songs with her; he died in September 2020 of cardiac arrest in Mexico. When she was 5 years old, Goto and her family moved from Monterrey to Tampico, Tamaulipas where she spent the remainder of her childhood and adolescence. As a young child, she participated in dance classes and began taking ballet lessons when she was four years old. She trained as a rhythmic gymnast from age five until she was fourteen, attending Rítmica Escuela de Gimnasia in Tampico. Goto earned recognition as a state and national champion and represented Mexico in international competitions. In 2000, she competed in rhythmic gymnastics at her first national junior Olympics tournament in Guadalajara, Mexico. In December 2010, she returned to Rítmica Escuela de Gimnasia to participate in a special Christmas themed performance alongside the school's current students.

Goto completed her primary education at Escuela Americana de Tampico ("The American School of Tampico" in English), a private bi-lingual school with an emphasis on American-style education. She participated in the school choir from an early age. She briefly attended the Tampico campus of Tec de Monterrey but later completed her secondary schooling via online correspondence upon moving to Mexico City when she was 17 years old.

== Acting career ==
=== Early career (2008–2011) ===
Goto began her television career in 2008 as a co-host on the youth-targeted television news show, Roomies, which was produced locally for Televisa del Golfo in Tampico. She spent a year on the show before leaving in 2009. During her time on "Roomies", she and some of the cast members were invited to audition for Centro de Educación Artística, the free drama school run by media giant, Televisa, in Mexico City. One month after her CEA audition, Goto was accepted into the school and moved to Mexico City, where she lived with relatives during her first year of school. During her first year, she studied voice, acting, and dance. When she was 18 years old, CEA held auditions for director Pedro Damián's (best known for his work with Latin-pop group, RBD) newest telenovela. Though she had no prior professional acting experience, she was cast as the lead in Niña de mi Corazón, an updated version of Damian's 1997 telenovela, Mi Pequeña Traviesa. Goto played the dual role of Andrea Paz and Paz's imaginary twin brother, Andres Paz. Following her casting in the series, Goto discontinued her studies at CEA to pursue a full-time acting career. Filming for Niña de mi Corazón began in January 2010 in Mexico City and ended in July 2010. The telenovela premiered on 8 March 2010 in Mexico and ended on 9 July 2010. It premiered on Univision in the U.S. on 23 February 2011. In the spring of 2011, Goto made her theatre debut as the lead female protagonist in the play El Knack directed by Odiseo Bichir, and starring Mexican actors, José Ángel Bichir and Alfonso Dosal.

=== Breakout success with "Miss XV" and other roles (2011–2015) ===
In June 2011, Goto attended a casting call in Mexico City for Televisa's teen-oriented musical television series, Miss XV. Actress Danna Paola was originally selected for one of two lead roles but later dropped out before casting was finalized. The following month, Goto was confirmed as the lead for the series.

Miss XV is a television series inspired by the famous 1987 telenovela, Quinceañera, starring Thalía and Adela Noriega. Filming for the television series began in October 2011 in Mexico City and concluded in June 2012. The show premiered on Nickelodeon Latin America on 16 April 2012. On Canal 5, the show began airing episodes on 14 May 2012 in Latin America. In the United States, the show premiered on Galavisión on 2 March 2013. A second season for the show was planned, but the project was cancelled before production started, in spite of the show's success. The series finale aired on 28 September 2012.

On 24 April 2013, Goto was announced as the co-lead in producer Pedro Damián's rumored telenovela, Las Mejores Amigas Best Friends Forever. Her former Miss XV co-star and ex-Eme 15 bandmate, Natasha Dupeyrón, was also tied to the project. Goto was expected to play one of lead characters who meets her best friend (played by Dupeyrón) while working as a counselor at a summer camp. The project was later cancelled for unknown reasons.

In July 2013, Goto auditioned for Vaselina, the Spanish-language remake of Grease, in Mexico City. She attended three callbacks before finally being cast by producers. Goto reportedly won the part over actresses Belinda and Eiza González, both of whom were rumored to be in the running for the lead role. In August, Goto was confirmed as "Sandy" in the 13th Mexican stage production of Vaselina. Benny Ibarra served as director. Rehearsals were held from August to October in Mexico City. Goto starred alongside her former Eme 15 bandmates, Eleazar Gomez, who played "Danny Seco", and Jack Duarte, during the play's first season. The play began on 17 October 2013 at Teatro Nextel in Mexico City. It ran for 10 weeks and closed its first season on 22 December 2013. In September 2013, Goto and the ensemble cast recorded an album, featuring songs from the play. On 17 December 2013, Vaselina was picked up for a second season which began on 16 January 2014 and concluded on 13 April 2014. Performances were held in Mexico City at the Centro Cultural Telmex. On 26 July 2014, the third season of Vaselina ended in Toluca, Mexico. Two days later, the entire cast was replaced by new actors for the upcoming season; Irán Castillo, who played "Sandy" in the 1994 Mexican production, replaced Goto. In total, Goto appeared in over 100 performances during the play's three seasons.

On 13 February 2014, Goto auditioned for producer Juan Osorio's telenovela, Mi Corazón Es Tuyo at Televisa San Ángel in Mexico City. The telenovela is an adaptation based on the 2002 Spanish television series, Ana y los 7. She auditioned for the role of "Fanny Lascurain". On 16 February 2014, producer Juan Osorio officially confirmed her participation in the telenovela via Twitter. Filming for the telenovela began on 21 April 2014. The telenovela filmed in Mexico City at Televisa San Ángel and at various locations throughout the State of Mexico. The telenovela began airing weekdays at 8:25 p.m. in Mexico on 30 June 2014 on Canal de las Estrellas, replacing Qué pobres tan ricos. Actors Carmen Salinas, Rafael Inclán, and Adrián Uribe also starred in the telenovela. In the United States, the telenovela premiered on 21 July 2014 at 8 p.m. E.T. on Univision. The telenovela's final episode aired in Mexico on 1 March 2015. The finale aired in the US on 27 March 2015.

On 6 February 2015, producers of Mi Corazón Es Tuyo announced that a stage version of the telenovela had been commissioned due to its popularity in Mexico. The family friendly version of the play featured the Lascurain family and Goto reprised her role as "Fanny". Filming for Mi Corazón Es Tuyo wrapped in mid-February. A special concert, which served as the telenovela's finale and featured performances by Goto, the cast, and other special guests, was filmed on 21 February 2015 at La Bombonera in Toluca, Mexico. The stage version of Mi Corazón Es Tuyo debuted in Pubela, Mexico on 6 March 2015. Additional performances were given in various cities throughout Mexico, including Guadalajara, Monterrey, León during March. Performances in Mexico City were held in April 2015. The play finished in mid-May 2015 in Cancún.

In early July 2015, Goto travelled to New York City to participate in a five-week summer "Physical Theatre" course at Stella Adler Studio of Acting, in order to refresh her skills as an actress. She returned to Mexico City in early August 2015. On 5 November 2015, it was confirmed that Goto would star in "Un camino hacia el destino", producer Nathalie Lartilleux's telenovela based on the 2003 Mexican telenovela, La Hija del Jardinero. She auditioned against four other actresses for the lead role and received news of her casting in early November 2015. Her role in the telenovela also required her to take violin lessons before production began. Filming began outside Mexico City on 23 November 2015. The telenovela premiered on 25 January 2016 in Mexico. It premiered in the U.S. on 26 February 2016 and aired weeknights on Canal de las Estrellas and Univision. The program's finale aired in the summer of 2016. Goto sings the telenovela's theme song, El Camino a Donde Voy.

=== 2016 to 2019 ===
In late October 2016, Goto was cast in the western adventure film, "La Leyenda Del Diamante" (previously called "El diamante rojo"), which commenced filming in November 2016 in Mexico City. Filming ended in early December of that same year. The movie later premiered on Netflix in 2019. On 22 February 2017, Goto was announced as the lead for producer Nathalie Lartilleux's new telenovela, "El vuelo de la victoria". Loosely based on a true story, Goto plays a runner who trains for the Olympics. Filming began in Mexico City on 2 May 2017. The telenovela premiered in Mexico on the network, Las estrellas on 10 July 2017.

In January 2018, Goto embarked on a national tour in Mexico as part of the cast of the comedy-drama play, "Dios mío hazme viuda por favor", based on the 2004 book of the same name by author, Josefina Vazquez Mota. The play, which tells the stories of five women's marital issues, ran in Mexico until February 2018.

In July 2019, Goto announced her return to television to film a lead role in the Mexican drama, "Vencer en silencio". Filming commenced in Mexico City on 2 July, lasting for several months. The telenovela will premiere in Mexico on 20 January 2020.

Goto was cast in her first leading film role in the Mexican comedy-drama movie, 'Veinteañera, divorciada y fantástica', with production held in Mexico City in November 2018. The movie is a spin-off of the 2016 Mexican comedy, 'Treintona, Soltera y Fantástica'. The movie will premiere in theaters in March 2020 in Mexico.

On 27 November 2019, Goto was announced as part of the cast for the Mexican film, 'Dioas al Asfarto'.

=== Acting hiatus and return (2024–present) ===
In August 2024, Goto announced that she had decided to take a break from acting in order to focus on her upcoming second studio album and career as a solo singer/songwriter. She stated that because acting was a full-time job, often requiring her to be on film sets all day, she had little time for her aspirations as a solo singer. That year she starred in the Mexican comedy-drama film, Entra mi vida. The film was released in Mexico on 18 July 2024.

In November 2025, it was announced that Goto would return to acting by starring in the telenovela Guardián de mi vida.

=== Other television projects ===
From April to June 2015, Goto traveled to Miami, Florida to film several appearances as a co-judge on the Sábado Gigante children's variety talent segment, "Estrellas del Futuro". The segment aired on Saturday evenings on Univision in the U.S. On 30 June 2015, she and Eleazar Gomez co-hosted the "Barbie Awards", a show recognizing young women who participate in philanthropy, journalism, sports, business, and acting. The show aired on 11 July 2015 on Canal 5.

Goto was a coach on the children's talent variety show, Pequeños Gigantes USA, the U.S. version of the Mexican show of the same name. In January 2017, she relocated to Miami to film the show. The program premiered on Univision on 6 February 2017. It airs weeknights from Monday through Thursday.

In 2025, Goto competed on the seventh season of ¿Quién es la máscara? as "Tropi Coco". Her identity was revealed during the season finale on 14 December 2025, where she was declared the winner of the season.

== Music career ==
=== Debut album: Paulina Goto (2010–2011) ===
Following the success of Niña de mi Corazón, Goto signed a contract with Sony Music Mexico in the spring of 2010 to record and release her own album as a solo artist. Carlos Lara composed many of the album's songs. Lynda Thomas and Pedro Damián were also collaborators in the recording of the album. Singer-songwriter, Dulce María, also contributed songs for the album. Before the album's release, two songs, Mio and A Pesar del Tiempo, were used on Niña de mi Corazón to promote the upcoming release of the CD. On 7 June 2010, her first single, Mio, was released digitally and physically to both iTunes and MixUp stores throughout Mexico. The single received over 39,000 plays on the radio within weeks of its release. The music video was filmed in May 2010 and released in conjunction with the final episodes of Niña de mi Corazón. Goto released her self-titled debut album on 22 June 2010.

During its first week of release, the album charted at number 7 on Mexico's Top Album charts for iTunes. The album debuted at number 66 on the Mexican Top 100 Album Charts during its first week of release. It peaked at number 43 on AMPROFON for one week, spending a total of four weeks in the Top 100. To promote her CD, Goto performed at various radio shows and festivals in Mexico and Central America throughout the remainder of the year. At the end of 2010, Goto lent her vocals to the song La Vida es un cuento de hadas real for the film Barbie, Barbie Moda Mágica en Paris. The album's second single, Vete al Diablo, was scheduled to be released sometime in 2011 but was later cancelled for unspecified reasons. No other further singles or tours were scheduled for release.

=== Eme 15 ===
After earning the lead role in Miss XV, Goto joined Eme 15, the fictional pop band featured on the show. She was the lead singer; the other five members: Elezar Gómez, Natasha Dupeyrón, Macarena Achaga, Yago Muñoz, and Jack Duarte, also appeared on the show as actors. The band released their first music video, Wonderland, on 4 April 2012. The video was filmed in October 2011 at Las Pozas, a garden in Xilitla, San Luis Potosí.Wonderland was officially released for digital download on iTunes in Mexico on 24 April 2012. The band's debut album, Eme 15, was available internationally for digital download and physical release on 26 June 2012. The album debuted at number 2 on the Mexican Top 100 Album Charts on 1 July 2012. It reached number one in Mexico on 23 July 2012. Their debut album was certified gold in Argentina for sales of 30,000 and platinum in Mexico for sales of 60,000 or more units.

On 18 December 2013, it was officially announced to fans via the band's official Twitter account that the band would split up, following their final concert on 5 January 2014 at the Mega Feria Imperial de Acapulco in Acapulco, Mexico.

=== Shelved second studio album and other solo music (2013 to 2015) ===
In April 2013, Goto performed material from her debut album and new songs at a solo concert at the Fiestas de Abril Tampico in her home state of Tamaulipas. The following year, she performed at the festival again, debuting new material of her own composition. In July 2014, Goto confirmed that she was in the process of writing songs and meeting with producers for her upcoming her sophomore album. She revealed that the album would have a mixture of electro-pop and acoustic influences. On 24 June 2014, she recorded a song called "Llévame Despacio", which is used during her scenes on Mi corazón es tuyo. The song was written by Mauricio L. Arriaga and J. Eduardo Murguía. On 23 July 2014, she filmed a lyric video in Mexico City for the song and later released it via her YouTube account on 26 July 2014.

On 3 November 2014, Goto confirmed in an interview that she composed songs with songwriters, Guillermo Méndez Guiú and Carlos Lara. Lara previously contributed material to both Goto and Eme 15's respective debut albums. On 4 February 2015, "Llévame Despacio" was released worldwide as a digital promo single on iTunes. On 3 July 2015, Goto announced that "Mi corazón es un país", would be the lead single from her upcoming untitled sophomore album. The single was written by Carlos Lara. Her planned second studio album was later shelved and she continued to work in film and television.

=== 2015 to 2020 ===
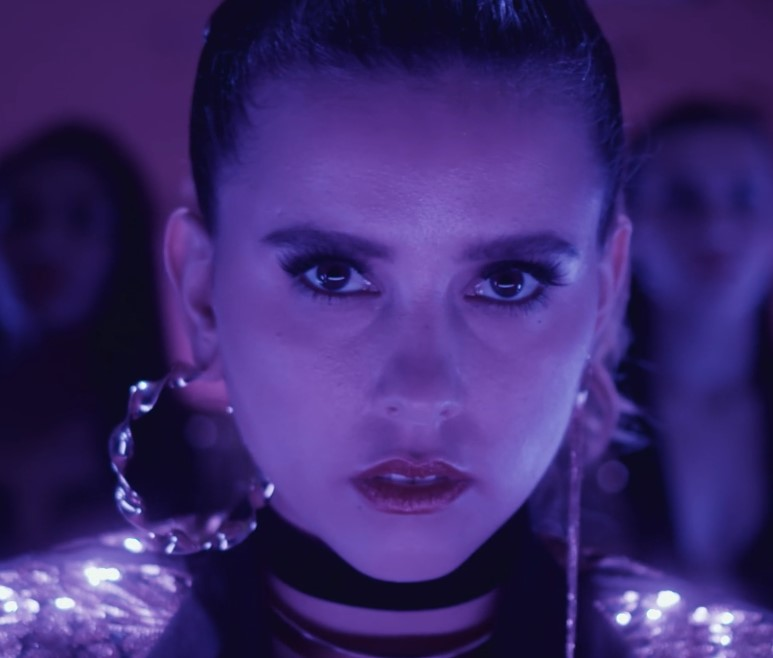
Goto in the music video of her song "Tú sigue"

In 2015, it was announced that Paulina will sing once again the main song for a Barbie movie, "Barbie Campamento Pop".

On 7 October 2015, Goto filmed the music video for Mi corazón es un país at Teatro de la Ciudad in Mexico City. The video was directed by Pedro Damián. The song was later released on iTunes and Spotify on 11 November 2015 for digital download and streaming. The music video was released on 29 April 2016. In early May 2016, Goto revealed that the album would contain between 6 and 7 songs in English and Spanish.

On 4 August 2017, Goto released the single, "Creo en tu amor", on the independent record label, "Touristas", with the help of Mexican singer-songwriter, Cecy Leos. The song was recorded in late 2015. The single is available for digital download on iTunes and other streaming platforms. A lyric music video was later released on 16 August 2017.

In 2018, Goto returned to her music with a new single, 'Tú sigue', released on 4 October 2018 on digital streaming platforms. On 14 February 2019, she followed up with her next single, "#Quién?".

On 11 November 2019, she released the first single, 'Hasta la vista', which was expected for her upcoming second studio album. Material from another planned second studio album was later shelved as Goto continued to write new music and sought new producers.

On a trip to London in 2019, Goto recorded a live EP of songs at the famous Abbey Road Studios in London. The EP was released for streaming services worldwide on 17 July 2020 and featured two new self-composed songs and a cover of the Beatles' song, Here Comes the Sun, Goto's first release in English. The EP was Goto's first release of a new studio compilation in nearly a decade.

=== 2024 to present: Re-launch of solo career and live album, Natural ===
Fourteen years after the release of her debut studio album, Goto announced via her official social media pages in early August 2024 that the lead single, "De viaje", would be released from her second studio album. Plans for previous solo material were scrapped due to Goto's focus as an independent artist without a record label. The single and its accompanying music video were released on 9 August 2024 for streaming media. Goto contributed to the soundtrack for the 2024 Mexican comedy/drama, Entra en mi vida, with the song, Natalia, perdón. She stated to the Mexican press that her solo music would feature contributions from female musicians, including her all-female backing band and use of female songwriters and producers, a rarity in Mexico's male-dominated recording industry.

In January 2025, Goto announced that her live album, Natural, and its accompanying concert documentary of the same name, would be released in Mexico. The live album was released digitally worldwide on 24 January 2025. The concert film will be shown in Mexico from 23 to 29 January 2025. The concert was filmed in 2024 in Mexico City. A tour is also slated to begin in Mexico City on 5 April 2025. The album will contain new material, as well as material from Eme 15's debut album and Goto's previous solo appearances from her 2010 self-titled debut album. Goto's close friend and Miss XV co-star/Eme 15 bandmate, Natasha Dupeyrón attended the concert film's premiere in January 2025.

== Spokesmodel career ==
On 5 February 2014, Goto was announced as the new face of Tampico Miramar, a tourism campaign aiming to attractive more visitors to her home state, Tamaulipas. Goto appeared in print advertisements and a promotional video which was filmed various tourist locations in the state for the campaign. In November 2014, Goto modeled clothing from the Spring/Summer 2015 collection in the fashion catalogue, "Mundo Terra". The collection was released in January 2015. She later appeared in the Autumn/Winter catalogue for the brand in the fall of 2015 and the Spring/Summer catalogue released in early 2016.

In January 2018, Goto, along with 11 "beauty influencers" from social media platforms, was chosen to design her own lipstick in collaboration with the makeup brand, MAC Cosmetics. The lipstick was later released as part of a limited edition piece of MAC's Spring 2018 line. Goto is the first Mexican actress to collaborate with the cosmetics brand on a lipstick.

== Personal life ==
Goto resides in Mexico City, where she has lived since she was 17 years old. She is fluent in English and Spanish. In June 2016, she revealed that she was in a relationship with Argentine actor, Horacio Pancheri, who she co-starred with in the telenovela, Un camino hacia el destino. In early 2018, Paulina and Horacio ended their relationship. She later referred to her former relationship with Pancheri as "toxic" and stated that the relationship negatively impacted her self-esteem.

On 28 February 2023, she married her longtime partner, Rodrigo Saval, in a civil ceremony in Mexico City. She and Saval had first met as teenagers and later reconnected as adults while attending the wedding of a mutual friend. They began dating in April 2019 and announced their engagement in September 2022. Saval works in public administration for the Mexican federal government and is not involved in the entertainment industry. They later remarried in a Catholic ceremony in front of family and friends on 14 October 2023 in Mexico City.

She plays piano and guitar. Her dog, Mila, a Pomeranian mix, was given to her as a gift from television producer, Natalia Lartilleux Nicaud, when Goto was cast in the telenovela, Un camino hacia al destino in 2016. She is a supporter of LGBTQ+ rights, abortion rights, and is a feminist. She has spoken out against femicide and gender-based violence in Mexico.

== Filmography ==
Film
Year	Title	Role	Notes
2016	"Theater Snobs"	Paulina/Herself	Unreleased short film. Debut English-speaking role
2017	"Yo soy Pepito"	Lucia	Film debut
2018	"La Leyenda Del Diamante"	Ana	Premiered on Netflix internationally in 2019
2020	Veinteañera, divorciada y fantástica	Regina	Comedy
2020	Diosas del asfalto	Muñeca	Drama
2023	Bendita suegra	Andrea	Comedy/Drama
2024	Entra en mi vida	Eugenia	Drama/Comedy
2024	Tu madre o la mia	Camila	Comedy/Drama (filmed in Spain in 2023)

Television
Year	Title	Role	Notes
2008-2009	Roomies	Herself	Television hostess for Televisa del Golfo
2010	Niña de mi corazón	Andrea Paz / Andrés Paz	Lead role/Acting debut
2012	Miss XV	Valentina Contreras	Lead role
2014-2015	Mi corazón es tuyo	Estefanía "Fanny" Lascuráin Diez	Supporting role
2016	Un camino hacia el destino	Luisa Fernanda	Lead role
2017	Pequeños Gigantes USA	Herself	Captain; team eliminated on episode 15
2017	El vuelo de la victoria	Victoria	Lead role
2020	Vencer el miedo	Marcela Dúran	Lead role
2020	Vencer el desamor	Marcela Dúran	Guest role
2021	Madre sólo hay dos	Mariana Herrera	Lead role (27 episodes; released as "Daughter from Another Mother" on Netflix in English-speaking markets)
2022	Vencer la ausencia	Marcela Dúran	Guest role
2025	¿Quién es la máscara?	Tropi Coco	Season 7 winner
2026	Guardián de mi vida	Bárbara "Barbi" Balmori-Ricci Peralta-Avitia	Lead role

=== Theatre ===
Year	Production	Role	Notes
2011	El Knack	Female protagonist	Theatre debut
2013-2014	Vaselina	Sandy Tontales	Mexican production of Grease
2015	Mi corazón es tuyo	Estefanía "Fanny" Lascuráin Diez	Stage adaptation of Mi corazón es tuyo
2018	Dios mío hazme viuda por favor	Silene	Comedy-drama

== Discography ==
Solo studio albums

Year	Album details	Peak chart positions
Year	Album details	MEX
2010	Paulina Goto: Released: 22 June 2010 (Mexico & USA); Label: Sony Music Entertainment México; Formats: Streaming, CD	43
"—" denotes releases that did not chart or not released to that country
2020	Abbey Road Sessions EP: Released: 17 July 2020 (Worldwide); Label: Independent/Self-released; Format: Streaming	—
2025	Natural Released: 24 January 2025 Label: Independent/Self-released Format: Streaming	
"—" denotes releases that did not chart or not released to that country

=== Discography with Eme 15 ===
Studio album

Year	Album details	Peak chart positions	
Year	Album details	MEX	ARG
2012	Eme 15: Released: 26 June 2012 (Internationally); Label: Warner Music México	1	1
"—" denotes releases that did not chart or not released to that country

Live album

Year	Album details	Peak chart positions	
Year	Album details	MEX	ARG
2013	Wonderland-Zona Preferente: Released: 30 April 2013; Label: Warner Music México; Format: CD and DVD (Physical and digital)	6	—
"—" denotes releases that did not chart or not released to that country

=== Singles ===
Year	Song	Album
2010	"Mío"	Paulina Goto
2012	"Wonderland" (as a member of Eme 15)	Eme 15
2012	"Solamente tú" (as a member of Eme 15)	Eme 15
2013	"Diferente" (as a member of Eme 15)	Wonderland-Zona Preferente
2015	"Llévame despacio"	Non-album single
2015	"Mi corazón es un país"	Non-album single
2017	"Creo en tu amor"	Non-album single
2018	"Tú Sigue"	Non-album single
2018	"Tú Sigue (Acústico)"	Non-album single
2019	"#Quién?"	Non-album single
2019	"Hasta la vista"	Non-album single
2019	"Hasta la vista (Acústica)"	Non-album single
2020	"Rompe (Vencer el Miedo)"	Non-album single
2020	"Golpe Avisa"	Non-album single
2020	"Capricornio"	Non-album single
2024	"De viaje"	Natural
2024	"El barco"	Natural
2024	"Vete al diablo" (live version)	Natural

=== Music videos ===
Year	Music Video	Album/Project	Artist
2010	"Mio"	Paulina Goto	Herself
2010	"Por estar juntos un año más"	Televisa New Year's Eve 2010 Campaign	Herself and various artists
2012	"Wonderland"	Eme 15	Eme 15
2012	"Solamente tú"	Eme 15	Eme 15
2013	"Diferente" (Live from the Auditorio Nacional)	Wonderland-Zona Preferente	Eme 15
2013	"Te quiero más"	Eme 15	Eme 15
2013	"Vivan los niños"	"Vivan los Niños" campaign	Eme 15
2013	"Baila"	"Muévete con Chester Cheetos" campaign	Eme 15
2014	"Llévame Despacio" (Lyric video)	Non-album single	Herself
2016	"Mi corazón es un país"	Non-album single	Herself
2017	"Creo en tu amor" (Lyric video)	Non-album single	Herself
2018	"Tú sigue"	Non-album single	Herself
2018	"Tú sigue (Acústico)"	Non-album single	Herself
2019	"#Quien?"	Non-album single	Herself
2019	"Hasta la vista"	Non-album single	Herself
2019	"Hasta la vista (Versión Acústica)"	Non-album single	Herself
2020	"Rompe (Vencer el Miedo)"	Non-album single	Herself
2020	"Golpe Avisa"	Non-album single	Herself
2020	"Capricornio"	Non-album single	Herself
2020	"Lero lero"	Non-album single	Herself
2021	"Libélulas"	Non-album single	Herself
2021	"Antagonista"	Non-album single	Herself
2021	"Me enamoré"	Non-album single	Herself
2021	"Nuestro Amor Es Arte"	Non-album single	Herself
2022	"Té de Limón"	Non-album single	Herself
2022	"Te Voy A Extrañar"	Non-album single	Herself
2024	"De viaje"	Natural	Herself
2024	"Siete planetas"	Non-album single	Herself
2024	"Que vivan los novios"	Non-album single	Herself

== Awards and nominations ==
TVyNovelas Awards

Year	Category	Nominated works	Result
2011	Best Young Actress	Niña de mi corazón	Won
2015	Best Young Actress	Mi corazón es tuyo	Won
2015	Best Smile (Favoritos del Público TVyNovelas Awards)	Mi corazón es tuyo	Won

Kids' Choice Awards México

Year	Category	Nominated works	Result
2012	Actriz Favorita (Favorite Actress)	Miss XV	Won
2015	Actriz Favorita (Favorite Actress)	Mi corazón es tuyo	Won
2015	Canción Favorita (Favorite Song)	"Llévame Despacio"	Nominated
2016	Actriz Favorita (Favorito Actress)	Un camino hacia el destino	Nominated

Kids' Choice Awards Argentina

Year	Category	Nominated works	Result
2012	Actriz Favorita (Favorite Actress)	Miss XV	Nominated

MTV Latin America Millennial Awards

Year	Category	Nominated works	Result
2015	Pareja en llamas (Couple on Fire)	Mi corazón es tuyo	Won (Shared with Juan Pablo Gil)
