= Underture =

Underture may refer to:

- "Underture", an instrumental from the Who album Tommy
- "The Underture", a song from the Alice Cooper album Welcome 2 My Nightmare
- "So Much Love / Underture", a song from the Blood, Sweat & Tears album Child Is Father to the Man
- "The Whistler/Underture", a song from the Ren & Stimpy Show soundtrack album You Eediot!
