= Horacio Pancheri =

Argentine actor and model

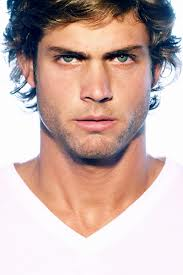
- Born: 2 December 1982 (age 42); Esquel, Argentina
- Occupation(s): Model, Actor
- Years active: 2014–present
- Partner: Isa Valero (2021)
- Children: 1

Horacio Pancheri (born 2 December 1982) is an Argentine actor and model. He played the lead role Carlos Gomez Ruiz in Un Camino Hacia El Destino, produced by Nathalie Lartilleux, alongside Paulina Goto, Lissete Morelos, René Strickler, Ana Patricia Rojo and Jorge Aravena.

== Career ==
Pancheri was born in Esquel, Argentina. He began his career by posing for magazines in Argentina. In September 2012 Pancheri moved to Mexico to learn acting with René Pereyra and subsequently was admitted to the Centro de Educación Artística of Televisa at the invitation of Eugenio Cobo. After two years of entertainment in March 2014, he made his debut in the Mexican television in the soap opera El color de la pasión, in where he played the young Alonso Gaxiola. In November 2014, producer Mapat L. de Zatarain gave him the opportunity to participate in the telenovela La sombra del pasado, where he plays Renato Ballesteros and shares credit once again with Michelle Renaud, actress that also participated in El color de la pasión. In 2016, he played Carlos Gomez Ruiz a production by Nathalie Lartilleux alongside Paulina Goto, Jorge Aravena and René Strickler.

== Filmography ==
Television roles
Year	Title	Roles	Notes
2014	The Color of Passion	Young Alonso Gaxiola	Recurring role; 5 episodes
2014–2015	La sombra del pasado	Renato Ballesteros	Recurring role; 110 episodes
2016	Un camino hacia el destino	Carlos Gómez	Main role; 125 episodes
2017	En tierras salvajes	Sergio Otero	Main role; 70 episodes
2019–24	El juego de las llaves	Valentín	Main cast
2020	La mexicana y el güero	Rodrigo	Recurring role
2020–2021	De brutas, nada	David Ibarra	Recurring role; 20 episodes
2021	Vencer el pasado	Alonso Cancino	Main cast
2023	Golpe de suerte	Facundo Grandinetti	Main cast

== Awards and nominations ==
Year	Award	Category	Works	Result
2016	Kids Choice Awards México	TV Favorite Actor	Un camino hacia el destino	Won
