= Daughter from Another Mother =

Mexican television series

- Spanish: Madre sólo hay dos
- Genre: Comedy drama
- Created by: Carolina Rivera; Fernando Sariñana
- Starring: Ludwika Paleta; Paulina Goto
- Country of origin: Mexico
- Original language: Spanish
- No. of seasons: 3
- No. of episodes: 27

Production
- Production company: Perro Azul

Original release
- Network: Netflix
- Release: 20 January 2021 – 25 December 2022

Daughter From Another Mother (Spanish: Madre sólo hay dos) is a 2021 Mexican television series starring Ludwika Paleta and Paulina Goto. The series premiered on Netflix on January 20, 2021. The series tells of two very different mothers, whose babies are switched at birth, being forced to come together and raise their daughters in one family.

Since its release, it was viewed by 23 million households.

Season 2 premiered on Netflix globally on December 24, 2021 and season 3 on December 25, 2022.

== Cast ==
- Ludwika Paleta as Ana Servín
- Paulina Goto as Mariana Herrera
- Martín Altomaro as Juan Carlos
- Liz Gallardo as Teresa "Tere"
- Dalexa Meneses as Ceci
- Emilio Beltrán as Rodrigo "Ro"
- Zaide Silvia Gutiérrez as Lucía, Mariana's grandmother
- Javier Ponce as Pablo Sandoval
- Oka Giner as Elena
- Rodrigo Cachero as Víctor, Juan Carlos's brother
- Nora Velázquez as Altagracia
- Elena del Río as Cynthia
- Lisa Owen as Ana's mother, Romelia
- Christian Chávez as Manolo
- Carmen Delgado as Laura Villa, lawyer

Family tree

Romelia	Lucía
Tere
Víctor	Juan Carlos	Ana
Mariana	Pablo
Ceci	Rodrigo	Valentina	Regina

== Episodes ==
=== Series overview ===
Series	Episodes	Originally released
1	9	20 January 2021
2	8	24 December 2021

=== Season 1 (2021) ===
No. overall	No. in season	Title	Directed by	Written by	Original release date
1	1	"Eeny, Meeny, Miny, Moe" (Chin-chan-pú)	Fernando Sariñana	Carolina Rivera	20 January 2021
2	2	"Welcome Home" (Bienvenidas a casa)	Fernando Sariñana	Fernando Sariñana	20 January 2021
3	3	"Family Dynamics" (Dinámicas familiares)	Fernando Sariñana	Carlos González Sariñana	20 January 2021
4	4	"Fatherhood" (Paternidad)	Kenya Márquez	Larissa Andrade	20 January 2021
5	5	"My Family's Not Perfect" (Mi familia no es perfecta)	Silvia Ortega Vettoretti	Kenya Márquez	20 January 2021
6	6	"Dating" (Dating)	Sebastian Sariñana	Paulina Barros	20 January 2021
7	7	"Quality Time" (Tiempo de calidad)	Sebastian Sariñana	Carlos González Sariñana	20 January 2021
8	8	"Lies" (Mentiras)	Carlos González Sariñana	Laura A. Villa and Fernando Sariñana	20 January 2021
9	9	"Baptism" (El bautizo)	Carlos González Sariñana	Cynthia Fernández Trejo and Carolina Rivera	20 January 2021

=== Season 2 ===
No. overall	No. in season	Title	Directed by	Written by	Original release date
10	1	"Mothers and Daughters" (Madres e Hijas)	Unknown	Unknown	24 December 2021
11	2	"Safety Net" (Red de Apoyo)	Unknown	Unknown	24 December 2021
12	3	"What's Next?" (¿Ahora qué sigue?)	Unknown	Unknown	24 December 2021
13	4	"Graduation" (Graduación)	Unknown	Unknown	24 December 2021
14	5	"Soldiers of Love" (Soldados del Amor)	Unknown	Unknown	24 December 2021
15	6	"Poker Face" (Pórker Face)	Unknown	Unknown	24 December 2021
16	7	"Divorce" (Divorcio)	Unknown	Unknown	24 December 2021
17	8	"There's No Escaping Fate" (Cuando te toca, aunque te quites)	Unknown	Unknown	24 December 2021
