= Travesuras de la niña mala =

- Genre: Drama
- Based on: The Bad Girl by Mario Vargas Llosa
- Developed by: María López Castaño
- Directed by: Alejandro Bazzano; Pavel Vázquez
- Starring: Macarena Achaga; Juan Pablo Di Pace
- Composer: Osvaldo Montes
- Country of origin: Mexico
- Original language: Spanish
- No. of seasons: 1
- No. of episodes: 10

Production
- Executive producers: Patricio Wills; Carlos Bardasano; Alejandro Bazzano; Vincenzo Graterri; Carla Gómez
- Producer: Andrés Barahona
- Editor: Sebastián Elizondo
- Camera setup: Multi-camera
- Production companies: W Studios; TelevisaUnivision

Original release
- Network: Vix+
- Release: 8 December 2022 – 2 February 2023

Travesuras de la niña mala is a Mexican streaming television series based on the novel of the same name, written by Mario Vargas Llosa. The series produced by W Studios for TelevisaUnivision. It stars Macarena Achaga and Juan Pablo Di Pace.

The series premiered on Vix+ on 8 December 2022. In March 2023, the series was renewed for a second season.

== Cast ==
- Macarena Achaga as Arlette
- Juan Pablo Di Pace as Ricardo Somocurcio
  - Jaime Maqueo as Young Ricardo
- Rowi Prieto as Paul
- Vanessa Saba as Tía Alberta
- Mariana Flores as Ana
- Natalia Benvenuto as Tía Adriana
- Paulina Gil as Lily
- Mónica Guzmán as Eufrasia
- Fernando Soto as Charnés
- Martijn Kuiper as Mr. Richardson
- Alba Messa as Carmencita
- Elisabeth Marín as Pilar
- Raúl Vega Damian as Alfredo
- Adriana Butoi as Marguerite
- Eduardo Tanús as Mateo
- Nestor Rodulfo as Chacón
- Fernando Cayo as Robert
- Edgardo González as Torrijos
- Juan Carlos Rey de Castro as Alberto
- Alec Chaparro as Henry
- Axel de la Rosa as Muñoz
- Olfa Masmoudi as Cecile
- Nacho Tapia as Lorenzo
- Katixa Mecerreyes as Sara
- Luiggi Lomparte as José
- Natalia Payán as Marirosa
  - Lot Soffi as Young Marirosa
- Nidia Bermejo as Inge
  - María Gutiérrez as Young Inge
- Carlos Humberto as Luquen
  - Santiago Elizondo as Young Luquen
- Teo Izquierdo as Pierre
- Javier Dulzaldes as Juan Barreto
- Inge Ladd as Mrs. Stubard
- Lariza Juárez as Pamela
- Julián Segura as Roy
- Mauro Sánchez Navarro as Manu
- Laura Valen as René
- Elena Pérez as Elisa
- Steph Bumelcrownd as Lucy
  - Renata Chacón as Young Lucy
- Victor Civeira as Salomón

== Production ==
=== Development ===
In June 2021, the series was announced as one of the titles for TelevisaUnivision's streaming platform Vix+. Filming began on 13 July 2022. In October 2022, the series was presented at the 2022 MIPCOM trade fair, where the series trailer was unveiled. On 17 November 2022, it was announced that the series would premiere on 8 December 2022. On 30 March 2023, Vix+ renewed the series for a second season.

=== Casting ===
On 23 June 2022, Macarena Achaga was cast in the lead role. On 13 July 2022, Juan Pablo Di Pace was cast in a main role. On 17 October 2022, an extensive cast list was published by online news site Deadline Hollywood.

== Episodes ==
| No. | Title | Original release date |
|---|---|---|
| 1 | "La reina del mambo" | 8 December 2022 |
| 2 | "Un sueño a medias" | 8 December 2022 |
| 3 | "Las niñas malas no lloran" | 15 December 2022 |
| 4 | "Dos años, seis meses y tres días" | 22 December 2022 |
| 5 | "Viejos amigos" | 29 December 2022 |
| 6 | "La isla de las casualidades" | 5 January 2023 |
| 7 | "La libertad" | 12 January 2023 |
| 8 | "Temporada de caza" | 19 January 2023 |
| 9 | "Bajo la sábana" | 26 January 2023 |
| 10 | "La última página" | 2 February 2023 |
