= Un camino hacia el destino =

Mexican telenovela

- Genre: Telenovela
- Written by: María Antonieta Galú Gutiérrez; Anthony Martínez; Dolores Ortegas
- Story by: Mariela Romero
- Directed by: Jesús Acuña Lee; Adrián Frutos; Guido Sánchez; Víctor Rodríguez
- Starring: Paulina Goto; Horacio Pancheri; Jorge Aravena; Ana Patricia Rojo; Lisette Morelos; Manuel Landeta; René Strickler; Eugenia Cauduro; Patricia Reyes Spíndola; Gustavo Rojo; Brandon Peniche
- Theme music composer: Jorge Eduardo Murguía; Mauricio Arriaga
- Opening theme: "Mi camino eres tú" performed by Paulina Goto
- Country of origin: Mexico
- Original language: Spanish
- No. of episodes: 125

Production
- Executive producer: Nathalie Lartilleux
- Producer: Leticia Díaz
- Production locations: Mexico City; Villa Victoria, Mexico; Cabo San Lucas, Mexico; Filming; Televisa San Ángel
- Editors: Alfredo Frutos Maza; Marcos Rocha Maza
- Camera setup: Multi-camera
- Running time: 50 minutes
- Production company: Televisa

Original release
- Network: Canal de las Estrellas
- Release: January 25 – July 17, 2016

Related
- La vecina; Despertar contigo; La Hija del Jardinero

Un camino hacia el destino (English: Road To Destiny) is a Mexican telenovela produced by Nathalie Lartilleux for Televisa. It is based on the Mexican telenovela La hija del jardinero, which was produced in 2003 by TV Azteca.

The series stars Paulina Goto as "Luisa Fernanda" and Horacio Pancheri as "Carlos".

== Synopsis ==
Luisa Fernanda Pérez, a beautiful, 18-year-old student, has two passions: mastering the violin and gardening, a skill she learned from her father, Pedro, the former groundskeeper of the wealthy Altamirano family's estate. A chance encounter with destiny alters her life after she is injured in a car accident caused by Luis (her biological father), a playboy lawyer and falls for his stepson, Carlos, an attractive, young doctor treating her at the local hospital.

== Cast ==
=== Main ===
- Paulina Goto as Luisa Fernanda
- Horacio Pancheri as Carlos Gómez
- Jorge Aravena as Pedro Pérez
- Ana Patricia Rojo as Mariana Altamirano
- Lisette Morelos as Amelia Altamirano
- Manuel Landeta as Hernán Sotomayor
- René Strickler as Luis Montero
- Eugenia Cauduro as Marissa Gómez
- Patricia Reyes Spíndola as Blanca
- Gustavo Rojo as Don Fernando Altamirano
- Brandon Peniche as Javier

==== Secondary ====
- Rocío Banquells as Guadalupe
- Agustín Arana as Licenciado Ignacio Ordóñez
- Candela Márquez as Isabela de León
- Ianis Guerrero as César
- Yuliana Peniche as Andrea Fonseca
- Alejandro Peniche as Felipe
- Andrés Pardavé as José
- Vanya Aguayo as Carolina de León
- Aranza Carreiro as Camila Sotomayor
- Lalo Brito as Hernán
- Samadhi Zendejas as Nadia
- Arena Ibarra as Adelina
- Claudia Martín as Vicky
- Bárbara López as Lucero
- Constanza Mirko as Virginia
- Aurora Clavel as Rosario
- María Morena as Migdalia
- Sheyla Tadeo as Sor Sonrisa
- Rocío Banquells as Guadalupe
- Harry Geithner as Leopoldo

=== Guest starts ===
- Rebeca Manríquez as Hermana Rosaura Pérez
- Alejandro Ruiz as Solórzano
- Arturo Farfán as Apolinar

== Background and casting process ==
Producer Nathalie Lartilleux's plans for a new telenovela were revealed in the spring of 2015. Goto confirmed in an interview that Un camino hacia el destino is not a remake of La hija del jardinero. Instead, it is based on some elements from the original telenovela. Casting for the telenovela began in late October 2015 where Paulina Goto auditioned for the lead role of "Luisa Fernanda". Goto took violin lessons for her role before production began on the program. Her casting in the telenovela was announced days later on November 6, 2015. Argentine actor, Horacio Pancheri, was later cast in the lead male role. Eugenia Cauduro and René Strickler were both confirmed for the telenovela in mid-November. The opening theme song of the telenovela is performed by Paulina Goto.

=== Filming ===
Production on the telenovela began on November 23, 2015 on location in Villa Victoria, a town located outside Mexico City. Additional scenes are filmed in Mexico City and at Televisa San Ángel. The cast also filmed several scenes in Cabo San Lucas, Mexico in mid-February 2016.

=== Promotion ===
On January 19, 2016, a private press event for the telenovela was held at Televisa San Ángel. A trailer featuring new scenes was also presented, and the principal cast and crew members were officially introduced to the media. Goto played the violin with an orchestra and sang the telenovela's theme song, "Mi camino eres tú". The event was streamed live on the telenovela's official website.

== Broadcast ==
The series premiered on January 25, 2016, in Mexico on El Canal de las Estrellas and currently airs weeknights. On February 23, 2016, it began airing weeknights in United States on Univision. Its premiere episode on Univision was watched by 2,086,000 viewers. The last episode was broadcast in August 29, 2016

== Awards and nominations ==
Year	Award	Category	Nominated	Result
2016	Kids Choice Awards México	TV Favorite Actor	Horacio Pancheri	Won
2016	Kids Choice Awards México	TV Favorite Actress	Paulina Goto	Nominated
2016	Kids Choice Awards México	TV Favorite program or series	Un camino hacia el destino	Nominated
2017	35th TVyNovelas Awards	Best Telenovela of the Year	Nathalie Lartilleux	Nominated
2017	35th TVyNovelas Awards	Best Leading Actress	Patricia Reyes Spíndola	Nominated
2017	35th TVyNovelas Awards	Best Co-lead Actress	Eugenia Cauduro	Nominated
2017	35th TVyNovelas Awards	Best Supporting Actress	Arcelia Ramírez	Nominated
2017	35th TVyNovelas Awards	Best Musical Theme	"Mi camino eres tú"	Nominated
2017	35th TVyNovelas Awards	Best Original Story or Adaptation	Un camino hacia el destino	Nominated
