= Plan V (film) =

- Directed by: Fez Noriega
- Starring: Natasha Dupeyrón; María Gabriela de Faría; José Pablo Minor; Stéphanie Gérard
- Release date: 17 August 2018
- Running time: 100 minutes
- Country: Mexico
- Language: Spanish

Plan V is a 2018 Mexican romantic comedy film directed by Fez Noriega. The film is stars Natasha Dupeyrón, María Gabriela de Faría, and José Pablo Minor, and premiered on 17 August 2018.

Principal photography began on 19 December 2016, and concluded on 21 January 2017.

== Plot ==
Paula (Natasha Dupeyrón) prepares to give an anniversary surprise to her boyfriend Chema, a famous telenovela actor. But the surprise is hers, however, when she finds him cheating on her with his agent Marcelo (David Alegre). Paula, in the company of her friends Fernanda (María Gabriela de Faría) and Jennifer (Stephanie Gerard), comes to the conclusion that what she needs to get rid of disappointment is a virgin man who will surely value her. The three friends come up with Plan V (virgin), that introduces them in the fascinating and, until then, unknown world of the university, in which they will find a series of endearing characters, among them Luis (José Pablo Minor), a handsome and intelligent virgin that will change their lives.

== Cast ==
- Natasha Dupeyrón as Paula
- María Gabriela de Faría as Fernanda
- José Pablo Minor as Luis
- Stéphanie Gérard as Jennifer
- Arath de la Torre as Profesor Limón
- Kevin Holt as Malcom
- Tamara Vallarta as Laurentina
- José Carlos Femat as Chema
