= Wonderland-Zona Preferente =

Live album by Eme 15
- Released: April 30, 2013
- Recorded: January 27, 2013, Auditorio Nacional in Mexico City
- Genre: Latin pop; pop rock; teen pop
- Length: 73:58 (CD); 86:43 (DVD)
- Label: Warner Music México
- Producer: Pedro Damián

Eme 15 chronology
Eme 15 (2012)	Wonderland-Zona Preferente (2013)

Singles from Wonderland-Zona Preferente
- 1. "Diferente (en vivo)" Released: April 9, 2013

Wonderland-Zona Preferente (also known as Wonderland Live (Zona Preferente)) is the first live album by the Latin pop band Eme 15. The album was recorded at the Auditorio Nacional in Mexico City on January 27, 2013. The album's first single, "Diferente", was recorded at the concert and released for digital download for iTunes in Mexico on April 9, 2013.

== Production ==
Following the success of their debut album, Eme 15 in Mexico, the band announced plans to record a concert CD and DVD in October 2012. The album was recorded in front of a live audience on January 27, 2013 during one of two performances that day. New songs on the album include a duet by Paulina Goto and Natasha Dupeyrón called "Que Buena Suerte", as well as the song, "Magic Dragon" (featuring Antonio De Carlo), and the band's third official single, "Diferente".

== Promotion ==
The album was released on April 30, 2013 in Mexico. It debuted on the Mexican Top 100 albums charts at number 6.

== Track listing ==
No.	Title	Writer(s)	Length
1.	"Intro"		1:27
2.	"Te quiero más"		3:48
3.	"Súper Loca"		3:14
4.	"Detrás de tu mirada"		3:48
5.	"Tengo Miedo"		3:18
6.	"Magic Dragon (featuring Antonio De Carlo)"		2:02
7.	"El Mapa"	Carlos Lara	4:07
8.	"Diferente"		3:50
9.	"Desde tu adiós"		3:31
10.	"No Hay Manera"	Carlos Lara	5:44
11.	"La Mala Vida"	Carlos Lara	3:34
12.	"Que buena suerte"		3:21
13.	"Ninguna como tu"		3:20
14.	"A mis Quince"		4:59
15.	"La"		3:35
16.	"No voy a cambiar"		3:50
17.	"Solamente Tú"		3:37
18.	"Wonderland"		5:23

== Charts ==
Charts (2013)	Peak position
Mexican Album Chart	6

== Release history ==
Country	Date	Label	Format(s)
Mexico	April 30, 2013	Warner Music México	CD and DVD (Physical and digital download)
