= Natasha Dupeyrón =

Mexican actress

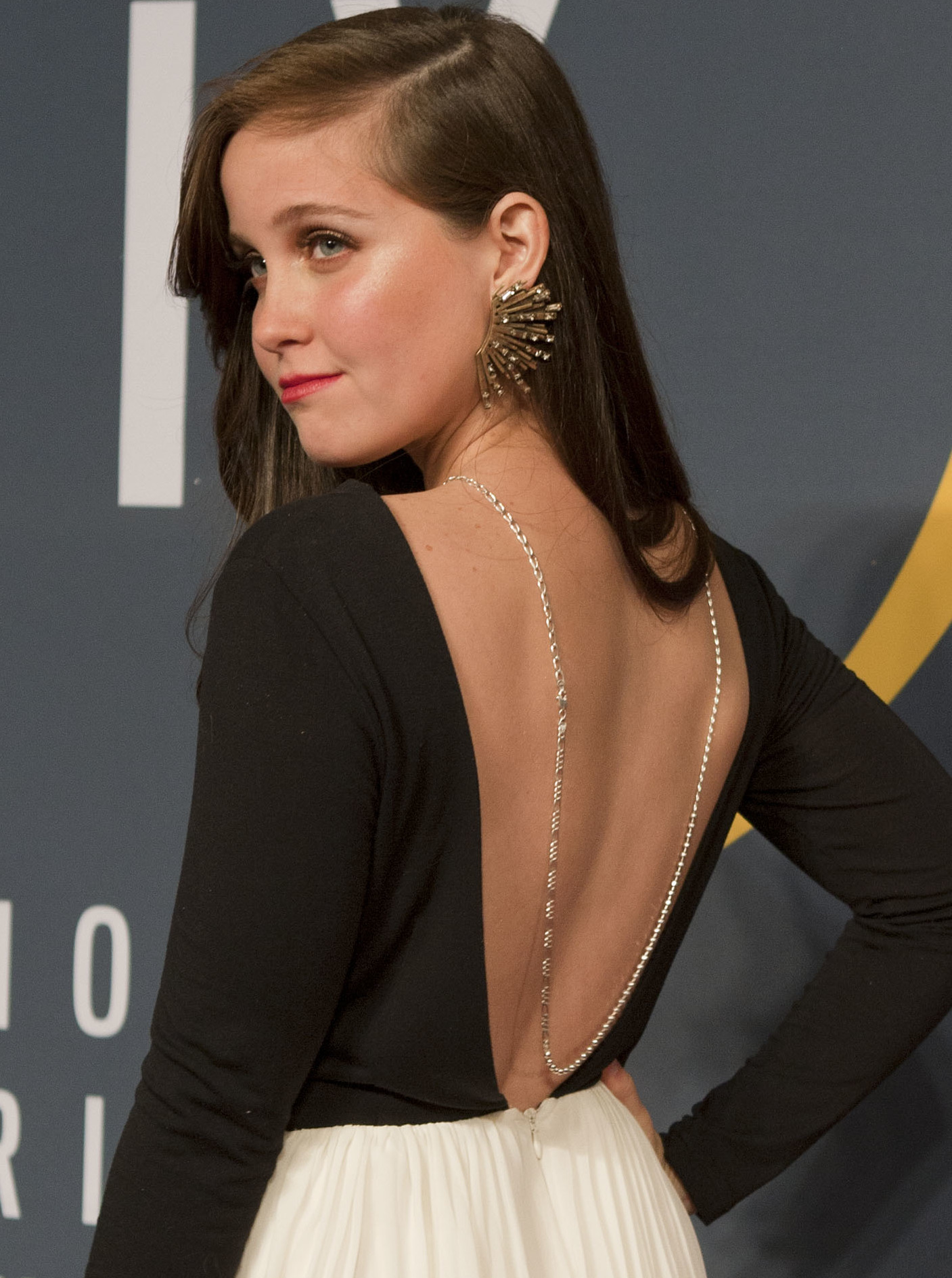
- Born: Natasha Elizabeth Dupeyrón Estrada; 3 June 1991 (age 35); Mexico City, Mexico
- Occupation: Actress
- Years active: 1995–present
- Spouse: Yago Muñoz (m. 2019)
- Musical career
- Genre: Latin pop
- Instrument: Vocals
- Formerly of: Eme 15 (2011–2014)

Natasha Elizabeth Dupeyrón Estrada (born 3 June 1991) is a Mexican actress. She has acted in various Mexican telenovelas since childhood.

== Early life ==
Dupeyrón was born in Mexico City to actor Humberto Dupeyrón and María de los Ángeles Estrada Luévano. Her father is a well-known actor in Mexico, whose career began in the 1950s as a child actor. She has one older brother, one younger brother, and one older sister. The Dupeyrón family traces part of their ancestry to a man who fled the French Revolution and later settled in Tabasco. Her paternal family has been involved in acting in Mexico and Central America for eight generations. Many of Dupeyrón's relatives are also actors including her paternal aunt, Elizabeth Dupeyrón and her siblings Odín, Odette, and Osterlen. She was educated at an all-girls Catholic school in Mexico City.

Her parents separated during her childhood. Her father later moved to a retirement home for actors in Mexico City, where he receives care for multiple sclerosis. Dupeyrón has a close relationship with her father and has spoken publicly about his health to raise awareness in Mexico about multiple sclerosis. She trained as an actor in the children's division of CEA, the free drama school run by television production company, Televisa in Mexico City.

== Acting career ==
=== Early career ===
Dupeyrón participated, as part of the extended cast, in the internationally acclaimed Mexican Telenovela "Maria la del Barrio" a 1995-1996 Televisa production in the role of Perlita Ordóñez then she received the role as an extra, in the telenovela, Doctor Cándido Pérez, when she was just 20 days old. Since childhood, she has participated in numerous roles in telenovelas, television, theatre, and films. She starred in many famous children's telenovelas such as Peregrina, Carita de ángel, and De pocas, Pocas Pulgas. In addition to television credits, Natasha also participated in ten theatre productions. She starred as Chiquis in the 2006 Mexican theatre production of Vaselina (Grease in Spanish) alongside Mexican actors, Sherlyn and Aarón Díaz. She performed in 100 productions of Vaselina. Following her role in Vaselina, Dupeyrón was cast in her first adolescent role as the wealthy rebellious teenager, "Marión Von Ferdinand", in the 2007 Mexican telenovela Lola...Érase una vez.

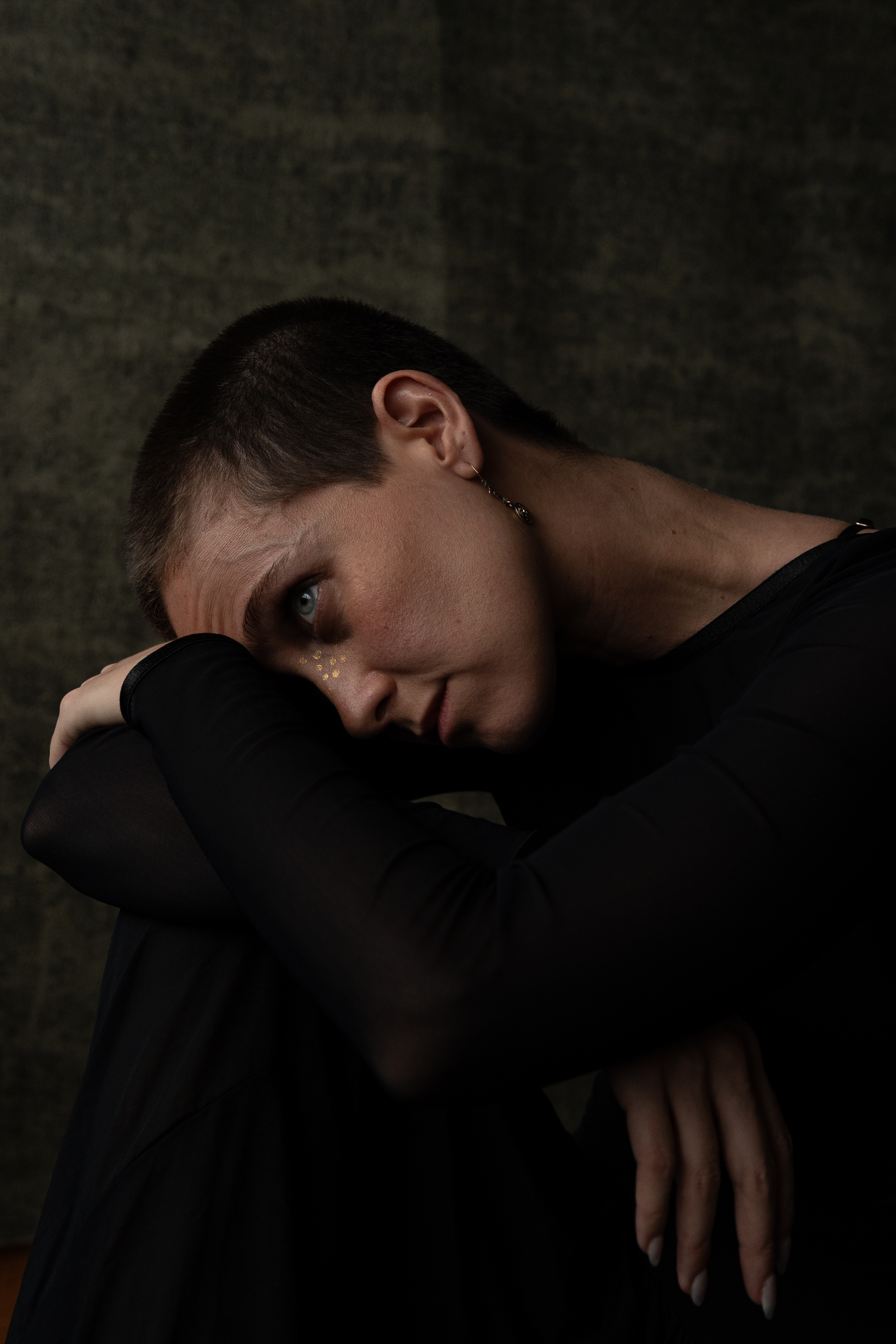
Natasha Dupeyrón, 2025

In 2008, she was cast as the blind teenager, "Lia", in the popular telenovela, Juro Que Te Amo. The following year, she starred alongside Dulce Maria in the telenovela Verano de Amor as Berenice. Filming for Verano de Amor was conducted in Tlacotalpan, Veracruz during the summer of 2009. In 2011, she appeared in the music video "El tiempo no lo cambiará" for the Mexican singer, Matteos.

=== Success with "Miss XV" and other roles (2011–2013) ===
In 2010, Pedro Damián announced plans to produce a remake of the famous 1987 telenovela Quinceañera. Natasha was cast as one of three female protagonists for the new version of Quinceanera called Miss XV. Danna Paola and Renanta Notni were also cast in the project as the remaining protagonists. However, the project was later reformatted and recast in June 2011. Both Paola and Notni were dropped from the project once casting became finalized in July 2011. Natasha remained an original cast member. Paulina Goto, Elezar Gómez, Yago Muñoz, Jack Duarte and Argentine newcomer, Macarena Achaga, were all cast as main characters in the teen musical television series, Miss XV.

Miss XV began filming in October 2011 in Mexico City and concluded in June 2012. The series had 120 episodes. Due to the show's success, a second season or spin-off idea was considered by producers, however, the idea was later rejected. The program debuted on Nickelodeon Latin America on 16 April 2012. On 5 May 2012, it began airing on Canal 5 throughout Latin America.

On 24 April 2013, Dupeyrón, along with her Miss XV co-star and Eme 15 bandmate, Paulina Goto, were announced as protagonists in producer Pedro Damian's newest telenovela, Las Mejores Amigas Best Friends Forever. Although not a spin-off or second season of Miss XV, the program was slated to include songs performed by Eme 15, the band featured on Miss XV. The project was expected to have between 80 and 100 episodes, but it was later canceled for unknown reasons.

In November 2012, Dupeyrón and her then-boyfriend, actor José Pablo Minor, filmed Esencia, a short film directed by Dupeyrón's older brother, Odin Dupeyron, in Mexico City. The concept for the project was created by Dupeyrón and Minor. The short film won honorable mention in a student film competition at CEA, where Minor was enrolled as a student before later becoming a full-time actor.

In October 2013, Dupeyrón was officially confirmed as "Frida" in producer Rosy Ocampo's latest telenovela, Qué pobres tan ricos. The show is a remake of a Colombian telenovela, Pobres Rico. Filming began in Mexico City in early October and the show premiered in Mexico on 11 November 2013 for Canal de las Estrellas. After more than six months of filming, production was completed in early May 2014. The series finale aired on 29 June 2014 in Mexico.

=== 2014–2015 ===
In December 2014, she filmed Dentro de la mina, a zombie horror movie, which is expected to be released sometime in 2015. The film is directed by Juan Antonio de la Riva and Dupeyrón plays "Roberta". The film was previously called Insurgentes Malditos. The film's final title was announced as Ladrona de almas in September 2015. In early January 2015, she appeared in a music video, "Contigo puedo see quién soy", with Mexican singer, Juan Solo, for his upcoming album, Ni Solo Ni Mal Acompañado. The music video premiered on 12 February 2015 on Solo's official YouTube channel. In January 2015, she began rehearsing for the play, Buen Viaje, where she alternated as the female lead. The play debuted on 8 January 2015 and ended on 8 February 2015. Performances were held from Thursdays to Saturdays at Teatro en Corto in the Colonia Nápoles neighborhood in Mexico City. In February 2015, she appeared in an episode of the YouTube series, "Querido Hijo de Puta", a monologue episodic skit, directed and produced by her older brother, Odin. Dupeyrón also co-starred in the play, Infidelidades, alongside actresses Erika Buenfil and Laura Flores. It is a Spanish-language adaptation based on the Woody Allen play, "Central Park West". The play premiered at Teatro Libanés in Mexico City on 20 February 2015. After appearing in 100 performances of "Infidelidades", Dupeyrón ended her run in the play on 29 June 2015 due to her rehearsal schedule for the musical, La Llamada. She later rejoined the cast for two special performances held on Broadway in New York City on 22 August 2015.

On 9 February 2015, she was announced as lead cast member for the play, "La Llamada". The musical comedy, set at a Catholic summer camp, is an adaptation based on the critically acclaimed Spanish play of the same name. The play premiered on 28 August 2015, and performances were held at Teatro López Tarso in Mexico City until November 2015.

In late September 2015, she travelled to Guadalajara and filmed a small part for the Mexican romantic comedy movie, Buscando a Inés., later renamed Treintona, soltera y fantástica. The film was released in Mexico on 7 October 2016. In December 2015, she traveled to Chiapas to film a small role in the upcoming Mexican soccer-themed romantic comedy movie, Túnel 19, since renamed "El que busca encuentra".

=== 2016–2018 ===
On 25 January 2016, Dupeyrón was confirmed as a cast member for Realidad aumentada, a Mexican television drama series directed by Jesus Magana, Luis Eduardo Reyes, Alejandro Iglesias and Jorge Aragon. The show filmed until the spring of 2016. The series is now called M.I.N.T., but does not yet have a release date. She filmed a role in the Mexican film, "La vida immoral de la pareja ideal", in San Miguel de Allende, Mexico in February 2016. The movie was released in Mexican cinemas on 28 October 2016. Dupeyrón voiced the character, "Katie", for the Latin American Spanish-language dub of the 2016 animated film, The Secret Life of Pets.

Dupeyrón was cast in the Mexican drama film, "Plan V", which began filming in Mexico City in mid-December 2016. Filming was also conducted in Guadalajara. The movie is expected to be released in February 2018. In June 2017, she was cast in a series that is slated to air in 2018. On 21 June 2017, she received a nomination for "Revelación femenina" (Best female revolution) for her work in the movie, Treintona, soltera y fantástica, at the 59th Ariel Awards, the Mexican film industry's equivalent of the Academy Award. The award show was held on 11 July 2017 at the Palacio de Bellas Artes in Mexico City. Dupeyrón did not win.

In late June 2017, she participated in the improvisation theatre series, "M.I.N.D." (Material Inédito No Degradable). In July 2017, Dupeyrón was cast in the Mexican adaptation of the Broadway play, Closer, by Patrick Marber. The play ran for 10 weeks starting on 18 August 2017. In 2018, she appeared in the Netflix series, La casa de las flores, for two seasons.

=== 2021–present ===
In 2022, she was cast in the film, Cuando Sea Joven. Her performance was met with critical acclaim and she received a nomination for Best Actress for the Silver Goddesses awards, which are awarded by the Mexican Cinema Journalists. She learned to sing bolero style music for her performance in the film. The film is a remake of the South Korea movie, Miss Granny. In 2022 and in 2024, she appeared in a lead role in the streaming television series, Señorita 89, which ran for two seasons. The show later aired in the UK when it was acquired by the BBC for streaming. The drama series is a fictionalised account based on the real life sexism accusations in Mexico's beauty pageant industry in the 1980s. The series was praised by critics.

== Other work ==
=== Music ===
In 2003, Dupeyrón and the other child actors from cast of the children's telenovela, De Pocas Pulgas Pulgas Pulgas, recorded two albums of music featured on the program and embarked on a tour of Latin America to promote the show.

==== Eme 15 ====
Dupeyrón was a member of the Mexican-Argentine musical group Eme 15, which was composed of the six lead actors from the television series, Miss XV. The other five members were Paulina Goto, Elezar Gómez, Macarena Achaga, Yago Muñoz, and Jack Duarte. The band performed songs presented on the show. Their debut performance was at Mexico's Kids Choice Awards on 3 September 2011 in Mexico City. They performed their first single, Wonderland. During a September 2013 live video chat with fans, Dupeyrón denied claims that she would continue a career as a solo singer following Eme 15's then-rumored separation. Instead, she expressed that she was more comfortable with acting rather than pursuing a singing career professionally.

Eme 15 split up following their final concert on 5 January 2014 at the Mega Feria Imperial de Acapulco in Acapulco, Mexico.

=== Spokesmodel ===
From 2009 to 2012, Dupeyrón modeled clothing for the women's collections in the popular print catalogue, Cklass in Mexico. In September 2012, she signed a contract as the newest spokesmodel for Maybelline cosmetics in Mexico. She appears in TV and print ads for Pure + Makeup line. In May 2013, she became the newest image for the Garnier Fructis 100% color de Garnier campaign in Mexico. Dupeyrón appeared in print and commercials to promote the hair color brand in Mexico.

In September 2014, she appeared in a national camping called "No te hagas güey" alongside other Mexican artists such as Sherlyn González and Daniela Magun. The campaign's aims to raise awareness against underage alcohol consumption in Mexico.

=== Production ===
Dupeyron served as a co-producer of the 2021 short film, Manchester Acatitla with her husband, Yago Muñoz. Her younger brother, Osterlen, was the film's assistant director. In 2023, she and her husband co-produced a short film called Chica de fábrica, which starred Oscar nominated actress, Yalitza Aparicio. Both short films were filmed in Mexico City.

== Personal life ==
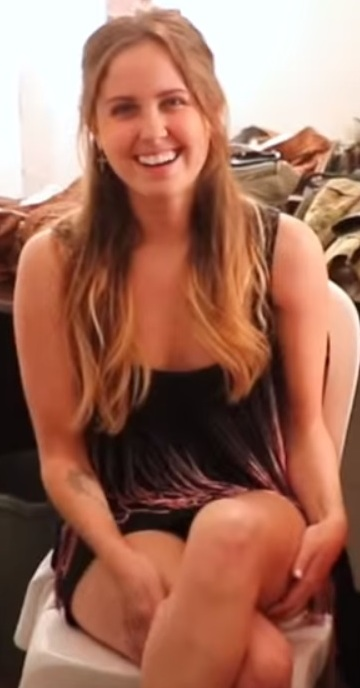
Dupeyrón in 2015

Dupeyrón studied piano and violin during her childhood. She began learning the ukulele in 2015. She is a supporter of animal rights. She moved out of her family's home in 2011 at age 19 and resides in Mexico City as of 2024. She was in a relationship with actor Eddy Vilard from 2008 to 2011. From 2012 until late 2015, she dated Mexican actor, José Pablo Minor. In June 2014, she briefly relocated to Boston, Massachusetts to study English in a summer course for three months. She returned to Mexico City in mid-August of the same year.

In December 2019, Dupeyrón married Mexican actor Yago Muñoz, her longtime friend and former Eme XV bandmate, in a small, civil ceremony in Mexico City. She is a feminist and supporter of abortion legalization in Mexico. She is a close friend of singer and actress, Paulina Goto, and sang at Goto's 2023 wedding in Mexico City. She and Goto previously worked together on the 2011 telenovela, Miss XV and were bandmates in EME15. She previously owned an Afghan Hound who died in 2023, and has a poodle mix and two adopted cats. Dupeyrón considers herself to be a private person and rarely discusses her personal life, despite being a public figure for 30 years.

In an April 2025 post on Instagram, she revealed that she completed her high school education with nearly perfect marks. She explained that due to her work as a child actor, she rarely attended school due to low self-esteem and a fear of failure. She credited therapy and her private instructor for helping her gain confidence. Some of her favourite subjects were physics, psychology, and algebra.

== Filmography ==
=== Film roles ===
Year	Title	Role	Notes
2000	Recompensa	Regina	Film debut
2006	Efectos secundarios	Mimí (18 years old)	
2015	Ladronas de almas	Roberta Cordero	
2016	Treintona, soltera y fantástica	Regina	Ariel Award nominee for "Best female revolution"
2016	The Secret Life of Pets	Katie	Latin American Spanish language voiceover
2016	La vida inmoral de la pareja ideal	Amelia	
2017	El que busca encuentra	Bibiana Zamarripa	
2018	Plan V	Paula	
2019	La boda de mi mejor amigo	Pamela	
2019	Un papá pirata	Sara	
2022	Cuando sea joven	María	

=== Television roles ===
Key
†	Denotes films that have not yet been released

Year	Title	Role	Notes
1995	María la del Barrio	Perlita Ordóñez	
1998	Gotita de amor	Loreta	
1998	Ángela	María Molina	
2000–2001	Carita de ángel	Mariana	
2000	Siempre te amaré	Antonia	
2001	Amigas y rivales	Aurora	
2002	La otra	Natalia Ibáñez	
2003	De pocas, pocas pulgas	Alejandra "Alex" Lastra	
2004–2005	Rebelde	Natasha / Augustina	
2005	Contra viento y marea	Gringa	
2005	Peregrina	Eva	
2007–2008	Lola, érase una vez	Marion Von Ferdinand	
2008	La rosa de Guadalupe	Verónica	Episode: "A como de lugar"
2008–2009	Juro que te amo	Rosalía Madrigal	
2009	Verano de amor	Berenice Perea Olmos	
2011	Momentos	Julia	Unaired TV pilot
2012	Miss XV	Nathalia D'Acosta	
2013–2014	Qué pobres tan ricos	Frida Ruizpalacios Romagnoli	
2017	M.I.N.T.	Abigail	Filmed in 2015; 2 episodes
2018	Aquí en la Tierra	Pia	Episode: "Bufotenina"
2018–2020	La casa de las flores	Ana Paula "La Chiquis" Corcuera	
2022–2024	Señorita 89	Isabel	Two seasons
2025	Los hilos del pasado	Tamara	
TBA	El dentista †		
TBA	Futuro Desierto †	Anya	Post-production

== Theatre ==
Year	Play	Role	Notes
2004	"Un mundo de colores"		Children's play
2006	"Vaselina"	Chiquis	Mexican production of "Grease"
2011	"Cenicienta"	Cenicienta	Mexican production of Cinderella
2015	"Bien viaje"	Ana	Lead/Alternate
2015	"Infidelidades"	Julieta	Supporting role. Adaptation of Woody Allen's Central Park West
2015	"La Llamada"	María Casado	Lead role/Musical comedy. Mexican production of "La Llamada"
2017	"M.I.N.D."	Juana	Sketch comedy
2017	"Closer"	Alicia	Mexican adaption of Closer

== Music video appearances ==
Year	Music Video	Artist
2011	El tiempo no lo cambiará	Matteos
2012	Wonderland	Eme 15
2012	Solamente Tú	Eme 15
2013	Differente (Live from the Auditorio Nacional)	Eme 15
2013	Te Quiero Más	Eme 15
2013	Vivan los Niños campaign	Eme 15
2013	Baila "Muévete con Chester Cheetos" campaign	Eme 15
2015	Contigo puedo ser quien soy	Juan Solo
2016	"Tú"	Yago Muñoz
