= Miss XV =

- Promotional poster with the series' principal cast.
- Genre: Teen telenovela Comedy drama Musical
- Created by: Jorge Durán Chávez
- Written by: Jorge Durán Chávez
- Directed by: Various
- Starring: Paulina Goto; Natasha Dupeyrón; Eleazar Gómez; Yago Muñoz; Jack Duarte; Macarena Achaga
- Theme music composer: Carlos Lara
- Opening theme: "Wonderland" "A Mis Quince" "Súper Loca" "Desde tu Adiós" "Te Quiero Más" "Solamente Tú" by Eme 15
- Ending theme: "Wonderland" "A Mis Quince" "El Mapa de Mi Interior" "Súper Loca" "No hay manera" by Eme 15
- Composer: Carlos Lara
- Country of origin: Mexico
- Original language: Spanish
- No. of episodes: 120

Production
- Executive producer: Pedro Damián
- Producers: Televisa; Nickelodeon; RCN Televisión
- Production location: Televisa San Ángel in Mexico City
- Running time: 45 Minutes

Original release
- Network: Nickelodeon; Canal 5
- Release: April 16 – September 28, 2012

Related
- Quinceañera

Miss XV, sometimes stylized as Miss 15, is a Mexican teen musical comedy-drama television series, it is loosely inspired by 1987 telenovela Quinceañera. Pedro Damián produced the series for Nickelodeon and Canal 5 in 2012.

== Synopsis ==
Miss XV follows the story of two teenage best friends, Valentina and Natalia (who were born on the same day at the same hour), who dream of the perfect quinceañera birthday party, and long to become the girlfriends of their respective crushes, Niko, an amateur musician, and Eddy, Valentina's older brother.

During their adventure to their quinceañera, both of them, especially Valentina, encounter their rivals—Leonora, an arrogant teenage girl who is crazily in love with Niko and constantly manipulates him into breaking up with Valentina, and Alexis, an attractive and spoiled man who often bullies Niko and manipulates Valentina into loving him.

== Production ==
=== Pre-production and background ===
Miss XV is inspired by the 1986 telenovela Quinceañera, starring Adela Noriega and Thalía. Producer Pedro Damián explained that the project is not a remake, nor is it an adaptation of the 1987 telenovela, Quinceanera. The project was first announced in late 2010, and filming began on October 12, 2011 in Mexico City. Filming concluded in Mexico City in early June 2012. There are 120 episodes. The program began airing on April 16, 2012 for Nickelodeon Latin America and began airing on May 14, 2012 on Canal 5. The series finale aired on September 28, 2012 for cable, and aired on October 26, 2012, for Canal 5 in Mexico.

The program debuted in the United States on Unimás on March 2, 2013, and was moved to Galavisión as of March 25, 2013, in Brazil on March 4, 2013 and Italy on March 30, 2013.

A second season, in the form of a spin-off, was considered by producers at Televisa largely due to the show and band, Eme 15's commercial success in Mexico. However, in May 2013, Eme 15 confirmed that plans for a second season or spin-off series of the show were cancelled. The show's producers declined to commission a second season, and instead, opted to focus on Eme 15's success as a musical act.

=== Original cast and recasting ===
In 2010, Miss XV (previously called Miss XV: Sueña Princesa) was announced as the latest television production from producer Pedro Damián as a collaboration for Canal 5, and Nickelodeon Latin America. Mexican actresses Danna Paola, Natasha Dupeyrón, and Renata Notni were all cast as leads for the telenovela. A trailer for the telenovela featuring all three actresses was released in late 2010. Mexican actor Eddy Vilard was previously attached to the project for a lead role alongside Danna Paola, but dropped out.

By the beginning of 2011, Miss XV was cancelled before production began for unknown reasons. However, in June 2011, the series was reformatted and recast. Most of the original actors previously attached to the project were dropped and their roles were recast. Casting was conducted in Mexico City during June and July 2011. Dupeyrón's role was not recast and she remained an original cast member. Danna Paola and Renata Notni were both dropped from the project. Paola stated that she was no longer interested and wished to work on her solo album.

Paulina Goto was cast as one of the lead protagonists, replacing Danna Paola. Eiza González auditioned for one of two lead roles. Gonzalez was considered for a part, but was later told that she lost the role because producers felt she was too old. Argentine singer and actress Brenda Asnicar also auditioned for a role, but did not receive a part.

=== Casting finalization ===
In August 2011, producers had completed casting in Mexico City. Paulina Goto, Eleazar Gómez, Natasha Dupeyrón, Yago Muñoz, and Jack Duarte were confirmed as the first five lead cast members. However, Pedro Damián revealed that producers were looking to cast third actress as the female antagonist "La Black Princess". In mid-August 2011, newcomer Macarena Achaga, an Argentine MTV Latin America television hostess and model, was confirmed as the lead female antagonist, Leonora Martínez. Miss XV is Achaga's acting debut.

== Cast ==
- Paulina Goto as Valentina Contreras
- Natasha Dupeyrón as Natalia D'Acosta
- Eleazar Gómez as Alejandro "Alexis" Reyes Mendez
- Yago Muñoz as Nicolas "Niko" Perez Palacios
- Jack Duarte as Eduardo "Eddy" Contreras
- Macarena Achaga as Leonora Martínez
- Gabriela Platas as Marina Landeros de D'Acosta
- Raquel Garza as Catalina Rosenda Gónzalez de los Monteros y Galicia de García de Contreras
- Verónica Jaspeado as Margara Ramona "Margarita, Magos" Contreras
- Sergio DeFassio as Rómulo Pedraza Sotelo
- Amairani as Juana Palacios / Lady Venenosa
- Reynaldo Rossano as Quirino Contreras
- Ignacio Casano as Sebastián D'Acosta
- Antonio De Carlo as Arístides Reyes / Magic Dragon
- Beatriz Moreno as Teodora Cuevas
- Oswaldo Zárate as Dosberto del Valle
- Fuzz as Lula López
- Pamela Ruz as Renata Domensaín
- Natalia Sainz as Tania Meza
- Alfonso Dosal as Maximiliano "Max" Menéndez
- Paola Torres as Fanny del Olmo
- José Eduardo Derbez as Patricio "Pato" Fuentes Pedraza
- Mariana Quiroz as Daniela "Manzanita" Contreras Gónzalez de los Monteros
- Lourdes Canale as Filomena "Miss Filo" Zapata
- Charly Rey as Camilo
- Araceli Mali as Maestra Miranda
- Montserrat Fligelman as Federica Martínez
- José Pablo Minor as Princípe Antonio Hernández de López y Martínez de Cervantes y del Hojeara Camacho
- Werner Bercht as Enrique "Kike" Martínez
- Nicole Vale as Paula Gil
- Joshua Gutiérrez as Miguel
- Raquel Pankowsky as Griselda
- Nicole Fur as Debbie Landeros / Agente Rosa
- Hendrick Marine as Fabián Espejo
- Queta Lavat as María
- Maricarmen Vela as Viuda de Robles

=== Guest stars ===
- Dulce María
- Beto Cuevas
- Moderatto

== Comparison to Quinceañera ==
Miss XV is a loose version of 1987 telenovela Quinceañera, and many of its characters have counterparts in both television series.

- Valentina Contreras/Maricruz Fernández: Valentina represents Maricruz. Her best friend is Natalia/Beatriz, and together they are about to turn fifteen. Both characters are in love with Niko/Pancho. Their antagonists are Leonora/Leonor and Alexis/Memo, who work together to prevent Valentina/Maricruz and Niko/Pancho from ending up together. Both characters also have a warm relationship with their aunt Margarita/Eduviges and their younger sister Manzanita/Adriana.
- Natalia D'Acosta/Beatriz Villanueva: Natalia represents Beatriz. Besides her friendship with Valentina/Maricruz, only daughter of divorced parents, they are distant with her. Both characters have their beloved maid Teodora/Pancha, and a cousin named Debby/Alejandra who disapproves her friendship with Valentina/Beatriz. Natalia/Beatriz is in love with Eddy/Gerardo, Valentina/Beatriz's brother.
- Nicolas "Niko" Perez/Francisco "Pancho": Niko represents Pancho. Valentina/Maricruz's love interest, he is a boy from low-class. He lives with his mother and cannot study because he has to work to support her. He is friends with Leonora/Leonor, who is in love with him. He doesn't reciprocate her love for Valentina/Maricruz, which leads Leonora/Leonor to work with Alexis/Memo to sabotage them.
- Alejandro "Alexis" Reyes/Guillermo "Memo" López: The main villain of both stories, he is in love with Valentina/Maricruz and makes no secret of his feelings, even though she always rejects him and makes it clear that she dislikes him. Besides his partnership with Leonora/Leonor, he is also friends with Pato/Chato, who helps him in his evil plans, although deep down he is a good person.
- Leonora Martínez/Leonor Gutiérrez: Another villain in both stories. Her parents are never home, and her closest relationship is her older sister, who advises her to be a better person. She's in love with Niko/Pancho, even though he makes it clear he only sees her as a friend. She pretends to be friends with Valentina/Maricruz, whom she secretly hates, and plots to harm her along with Alexis/Memo.
- Eduardo "Eddy" Contreras/Gerardo Fernández: The least loyal character in comparison to Quinceañera, He maintains to be Valentina/Maricruz's older brother. He loves his sister's best friend, Natalia/Beatriz. His relationship with her is up and down because he cheated on her, which makes her distrust him. He is also very spoiled by his mother, Catalina/Carmen.

== Musical Group: Eme 15 ==
Eme 15 was a band composed of the six main actors in the series. The members are Paulina Goto, Eleazar Gómez, Natasha Dupeyrón, Macarena Achaga, Yago Muñoz, and Jack Duarte. The band will sing songs presented on the show. Eme 15's debut performance was at Mexico's Kids Choice Awards on September 3, 2011 in Mexico City. They performed their first single, "Wonderland". The official music video for "Wonderland" was filmed in October 2011 in Las Pozas, a park in Xilitla, San Luis Potosí. The music video premiered on April 4, 2012 on cafedecamilo.com. "Wonderland" was officially released for digital download on iTunes in Mexico on April 24, 2012. Eme 15's debut album was available for on June 26, 2012 for physical and digital release.

On December 18, 2013, the band announced via its official Twitter account that it would split up, following its final concert on January 5, 2014 at the Mega Feria Imperial de Acapulco in Acapulco, Mexico.
