= Antonio De Carlo =

Mexican actor

Antonio De Carlo (born August 4, 1967, in Tijuana, Baja California, Mexico), also known simply as Antonio, is a Mexican actor. He won an Emmy Award in 2005–2006. He is president and founder of the "Fundación Cultura Sin Fronteras AC". After twelve years out of show business, in 2012 he returned to the soap operas performing "Magic Dragon" one of the main characters for Miss XV, a co-production from Televisa México and Nickelodeon directed and produced by Pedro Damian. He is also part of the cast of Muchacha Italiana Viene a Casarse, directed by Pedro Damian (Televisa, México).

== Education ==
In 1988 De Carlo received a B.A. degree in music from the Mexican National Music Conservatory. He was a member of the Teacher's Bar of Graduates in México City between 1995 and 1997. He also collaborated with the Foundation of Social Investigations FISAC between 1998 and 1999.

== Awards ==
He has received several awards including the Golden Sun (Sol de Oro), the Golden Palms (Palmas de Oro), given by the Mexican National Circle of Journalists. He was awarded the Spanish Golden Laurel (Laurel de Oro) by the Same Out Group and the national award for public speaking in 1997 by Miguel Cornejo y Rosado. He is also included in the walk of fame in Tijuana's International Airport. On February 14, 2003 the Mayor of Tijuana, Jesus Gonzalez Reyes, gave him the Keys to the City of Tijuana.

De Carlo won his first Emmy Award on 2005 as Hispanic News Anchor in the category of "Informational/Public Affairs Series" and in the same year founded the Academia De Artes Antonio De Carlo (Hispanic Academy of Arts) in Los Angeles, California, then he got his second Emmy on 2006 in the same category of "Informational/Public Affairs Series".

On July 14, 2008, the City Council of the City of Lynwood, California, distinguished Antonio with a proclamation in recognition of his outstanding career in the field of communications, as a professional television anchor and director, writer and producer of many theatre plays, actor of many soap operas produced by Televisa México and Singer, winner of three platinum records and seven gold records.

=== Soap operas ===
- Las 5 Mejores (2019 to date)... Producer and Director for TLNovelas Channel
- Despertar contigo (2016)... Rogelio
- Muchacha Italiana Viene a Casarse (2014)... Zacarias
- Miss XV (2012)... Aristides "Magic Dragon"
- Catalina y Sebastián (1999)... Padre Jerónimo
- La Usurpadora (1998)... Osvaldo Reséndiz
- Marisol (1996)... Rosendo
- Pobre niña rica (1995)... César Manzanillo
- Imperio de cristal (1994)... Bruno Previdi
- La pícara soñadora (1991)... Santiago Garrido
- Mi pequeña Soledad (1990)... José Luis Garza

=== TV series ===
- Miss XV (2012)... Aristides "Magic Dragon"
- Siempre en Domingo (1988–1991)... His Self "Antonio De Carlo" (Antonio/Singer)

=== Movies ===
- Alas de Mariposa (1992)... "Dustman"
- Verano Peligroso (1991)... "Lisandro Galante"
