= Eme 15 (album) =

EME-15

Studio album by Eme 15
- Released: June 26, 2012; November 13, 2012 (re-release Christmas edition)
- Recorded: August 2011 – early 2012 in Mexico City
- Genre: Latin pop; pop rock; teen pop
- Length: 43:37 (standard edition); 45:59 (iTunes bonus track); 64:46 (re-release Christmas edition)
- Label: Warner Music México
- Producer: Carlos Lara

Eme 15 chronology
EME-15 (2012)	Wonderland-Zona Preferente (2013)

Singles from Eme 15
- 1. "Wonderland" Released: April 24, 2012; 2. "Solamente Tú" Released: October 9, 2012

Singles from Eme 15 – (promotional singles)
- 1. "A Mis Quince (Miss XV)" Released: June 12, 2012; 2. "Súper Loca" Released: June 19, 2012; 3. "Desde Tu Adiós" Released: June 19, 2012

EME-15 is the self-titled debut studio album by Mexican-Argentine pop band Eme 15. The album was released in Mexico and Latin America on June 26, 2012 through Warner Music México, and features songs from the Nickelodeon Latin America and Televisa musical television series, Miss XV.

== Background ==
=== Production ===
EME-15 began recording their debut album in Mexico City in August 2011. The album includes 12 songs written by songwriters Carlos Lara, Lynda Thomas, and Pedro Muñoz. A bonus track is included for purchase with iTunes download in Mexico and Latin America. The album was produced by Carlos Lara.

=== Release ===
The album was released in Mexico on June 23, 2012 for special purchase as a physical release at MixUp store locations. On June 26, 2012, the album was available for purchase as a digital download throughout Latin America via iTunes. The album debuted at number 2 in Mexico on July 1, 2012. It reached number one in Mexico on July 23, 2012, and was certified platinum in Mexico for sales of 60,000 or more units.

=== Re-release ===
The group recorded four Christmas cover songs and two demos to be included on the re-edition version of their debut album. The re-edition album was released for digital download in Mexico on iTunes on November 13, 2012. Within 10 days of its release on November 13, 2012, the band's Christmas re-release album was certified gold in Mexico for 30,000 sales or more.

== Singles ==
"Wonderland" was announced as the debut single from Eme 15's debut album. The band debuted their single for the first time at the Mexican Kids Choice Awards in Mexico City in September 2011. Written by songwriters Carlos Lara and Pedro Muñoz, the song also serves as the closing theme for Miss XV. "Solamente Tú" was confirmed as the second official single from Eme 15's debut album. In early October 2012, the band filmed a music video on the beach for their second single, "Solamente Tú" in Acapulco, Mexico. The video premiered exclusively on MTV Latin America's website on October 29, 2012. The single was available for digital download on iTunes for Mexico on October 9, 2012.

=== Promotional singles ===
In order to promote the album, three promotional singles were released exclusively through iTunes in Latin America during June 2012. "A Mis Qunice (Miss XV)" was the first promotional single, released on June 12, 2012. The song serves as the opening theme song to the television series, Miss XV, and features the vocals of Paulina Goto and Natasha Dupeyrón. "Súper Loca" was announced as the second promotional single, and was released June 19, 2012 on iTunes. The song features the vocals of Eme 15's female members. "Desde Tu Adiós was the third and final promotional single, released on the same day as "Súper Loca". The male members of Eme 15 sing the vocals for this song.

== Track listing ==
No.	Title	Writer(s)	Length
1.	"Wonderland"	Carlos Lara and Pedro Muñoz	4:19
2.	"Solamente Tú"		3:59
3.	"Desde Tu Adiós"		3:36
4.	"Súper Loca"		3:08
5.	"La Mala Vida"		3:36
6.	"A Mis Quince (Miss XV)"	Carlos Lara	3:43
7.	"El Mapa de Mi Interior"	Carlos Lara	3:53
8.	"La"		4:04
9.	"Te Quiero Más"		4:01
10.	"No Hay Manera"		3:43
11.	"Detrás de Tu Mirada"	Carlos Lara	3:50
12.	"Ninguna Como Tú"		3:17

iTunes bonus track
No.	Title	Length
13.	"Tengo Miedo"	3:22

Christmas edition bonus tracks
No.	Title	Length
13.	"Tengo Miedo"	3:21
14.	"No Voy a Cambiar"	4:10
15.	"Todo Lo Que Quiero en Navidad"	3:16
16.	"Tú Lo Escuchas También"	3:10
17.	"Noche de Paz"	2:39
18.	"Dulce Navidad"	3:36

Notes

- No Hay Manera is a solo song sung by Paulina Goto.
- Todo Lo Que Quiero en Navidad is a Spanish language cover of Mariah Carey's "All I Want for Christmas Is You".
- Noche de Paz is a Spanish language cover of "Silent Night"
- Dulce Navidad is a Spanish language cover of "Jingle Bells"

== Charts ==
Chart (2012)	Peak position
Mexican Album Chart	1

=== Year-end charts ===
Chart (2012)	Position
Mexican Albums (MEX)	17

== Certifications ==
Region	Certification	Certified units/sales
Mexico (AMPROFON)	Platinum	60,000^{^}
Argentina (CAPIF)	Gold	20,000^{^}
^{^} Shipments figures based on certification alone.

== Release history ==
Country	Date	Label	Format(s)
Mexico	June 26, 2012 & November 12, 2012 (re-release edition)	Warner Music México	CD & Digital download
Latin America	June 26, 2012	Warner Music México	Digital download
