= Niña de mi corazón =

Mexican telenovela

- Also known as: Niña de mi Corazón... El Amor Está de tu Lado
- Genre: Drama
- Created by: Abel Santa Cruz
- Written by: María Cervantes Balmori; Pedro Armando Rodríguez; Alejandra Romero Meza; José Ierfino
- Directed by: Luis Pardo; Juan Carlos Muñoz
- Starring: Maribel Guardia; Arturo Peniche; Erick Elías; Lorena Herrera; Paulina Goto
- Theme music composer: Pablo Dabdoub; Carlos Law
- Opening theme: Ándale niña performed by U.N.O; Mío performed by Paulina Goto; Niña de mi corazón performed by La Arrolladora Banda El Limón; Niña de mi corazón performed by Mané de la Parra and Margarita la Diosa de la Cumbia
- Country of origin: Mexico
- Original language: Spanish
- No. of episodes: 90; (80 International version)

Production
- Executive producer: Pedro Damián
- Producer: Luis Luisillo Miguel
- Production locations: Filming; Televisa San Ángel; Mexico City, Mexico; Locations; Puerto Peñasco, Sonora, Mexico
- Cinematography: Daniel Ferrer; Vivian Sánchez Ross
- Camera setup: Multi-camera
- Running time: 41-44 minutes (episodes 1-70); 21-22 minutes (episodes 71-90)
- Production company: Televisa

Original release
- Network: Canal de las Estrellas
- Release: March 8 – July 9, 2010

Related
- Me llaman Gorrión (1972); Gorrión (1994); Mi pequeña traviesa (1997); Pequena Travessa (2002)

Niña de mi corazón (English title: A Double Identity) is a Mexican telenovela produced by Pedro Damián for Televisa that aired on Canal de las Estrellas from March 8, 2010 to July 9, 2010. It is a remake of the Mexican telenovela Mi pequeña traviesa, also produced by Pedro Damián.

Paulina Goto and Erick Elías starred as protagonists, Maribel Guardia and Arturo Peniche starred as co-protagonists, while Lorena Herrera, Lisette Morelos Julio Camejo and Martha Julia starred as antagonists.

In the United States, Univision broadcast Niña de mi corazón from February 28, 2011 to June 17, 2011.

== Plot ==
Andrea Paz (Paulina Goto) is a 17-year-old working-class girl. Her dream is to finish school and become a lawyer. Andrea's aspirations fall apart when she learns that her father Benigno (José Elías Moreno) was run over by a car, and left in a wheelchair as a result. Abandoned by her mother, and with two brothers to support, Andréa is forced to leave everything behind and begin an adult life, work, and pay the household bills as well as support her dad. To make matters worse, her brother Damián (Adriano Zendejas) gets into drugs.

Thanks to Vittorio, a friend of the family, Andrea gets a job at Maximo's (Arturo Peniche) law firm, as the assistant of the owners' son Darío (Erick Elías). Moira (Lisette Morelos), Dario's girlfriend, does not like that Dario works with an attractive, young woman, so she convinces Maximo to fire her and hire a man. Andrea returns disguised as a man, and says that she is Andrés, her twin brother. After some time at the law firm, Máximo offers Andrea a job as a receptionist. With two jobs and two identities, Andrea has to be agile and cunning.

== Cast ==
=== Main ===
- Maribel Guardia as Pilar Alarcón de Arrioja
- Arturo Peniche as Máximo Arrioja Riquelme
- Erick Elías as Darío Arrioja Alarcón
- Lorena Herrera as Silvana Quinto Vda. de Casca
- Paulina Goto as Andrea Paz "La Niña"/Andrés Paz

=== Also main ===
- Lisette Morelos as Moira Gasca Quinto
- Julio Camejo as Jason "Papi" Bravo López
- Ximena Herrera as María Magdalena Bravo López
- Martha Julia as Tamara Díez
- Rafael Inclán as Vittorio Conti
- José Elías Moreno as Sr. Benigno Paz
- Alberto Estrella as El Ángel Uriel
- Gerardo Albarrán as Donato Blume
- Lucero Lander as Eloísa
- Lorena Velázquez as Mercedes Riquelme Vda. de Arrioja
- Isela Vega as Doña Belén
- Osvaldo de León as Juan Vicente Huerta
- Zoraida Gómez as Carolina Clavados
- Brandon Peniche as Conrado Gayardo "Masiosare/Cónsul"
- Jon Ecker as El Mudra
- Adriano Zendejas as Damián Paz
- Mané de la Parra as Charly
- Luis Ceballos as Alfonso Fernández "El Vocho"
- Carlos Speitzer as El Geek
- Jade Fraser as Ximena Arrioja Alarcón
- Evelyn Cedeño as Priscila
- Roberto Assad as Boris Rey
- Uriel del Toro as Bruno
- Elsa Marín as Petra Morales
- Lourdes Canale as Doña Trinidad "Trini"
- Bárbara Torres as Florencia
- Ale Müller as Evelyn
- Tatiana Martínez as El Bombón de la Discordia

=== Special participation ===
- Polo Ortin as Mercedonio
- Jaime Garza as Dionisio Bravo
- Carlos Cámara Jr. as Dimitri Molotov
- África Zavala as Rosario "Chayo" Cruz
- Harold Azuara as José "Pepe" Cruz
- Jocelin Zuckerman as Perla Cruz

== Awards and nominations ==
=== TVyNovelas Awards ===
| Year | Category | Nominee | Result |
|---|---|---|---|
| 2011 | Best Leading Actor | José Elías Moreno | Nominated |
| 2011 | Best Young Lead Actress | Paulina Goto | Won |
| 2011 | Best Male Revelation | Brandon Peniche | Nominated |

=== People en Español Awards ===
| Year | Category | Nominee | Result |
|---|---|---|---|
| 2011 | Revelation of the Year | Paulina Goto | Nominated |

=== Kids Choice México Awards ===
| Year | Category | Nominee | Result |
|---|---|---|---|
| 2011 | Favorite Villain | Lisette Morelos | Nominated |
