= Ren & Stimpy's Crock O' Christmas =

Christmas album

Soundtrack album by Ren and Stimpy
- Released: September 21, 1993
- Length: 46:42
- Labels: Sony; Nick; Kid Rhino
- Producers: Charlie Brissette; Vanessa Coffey

Ren and Stimpy chronology
You Eediot! (1993)	Ren & Stimpy's Crock O' Christmas (1993)	Radio Daze (1995)

Professional ratings
Review scores
Source	Rating
AllMusic	Review

Ren & Stimpy's Crock O' Christmas is the second album and only Christmas album featuring characters from the Nickelodeon animated series, The Ren & Stimpy Show.

The album, originally released September 21, 1993 through Nickelodeon, Sony Wonder and Epic Records, is a concept album that follows the title characters as they prepare for the holidays; in their case, the holiday is "Yaksmas Eve", a reference to the second episode of the original 1991 season in which they prepare for Yak Shaving Day and a visit from the Gilded Yak via his flying "enchanted canoe". Soiled diapers are hung from mantelpieces in lieu of Christmas stockings while another tradition calls for filling of one's uncle's boots with coleslaw. It is hoped that the Gilded Yak, who lives at the "West Pole" and who appears via the drain of the bathtub, will leave shaving cream scum in the bathroom sink.

Ren & Stimpy's Crock O' Christmas was re-released on compact disc on August 5, 1997 on the Kid Rhino Entertainment record label. As in the case with later episodes of the television program, Billy West provided the speaking and singing voices of both Ren and Stimpy, as John Kricfalusi was fired a year before.

== Track listing ==
1. "Fleck the Walls" – 2:51 – Stimpy explains to Ren that it is Yaksmas Eve to the tune of "Deck the Halls". The song had an accompanying music video.
2. "Cat Hairballs" – 3:27 – Stimpy sings about the gifts he can make out of his hairballs to the tune of "Jingle Bells". The song had an accompanying music video where Stimpy is being farmed for the titular item and spitting them onto a conveyor belt, where Ren stamps them. By the end, Stimpy is used up and falls onto the belt and is stamped on the buttocks by Ren.
3. "We Wish You a Hairy Chestwig" – 3:04 – Ren and Stimpy sing about the "chestwig" they've gotten for Mr. Pipe to the tune of "We Wish You a Merry Christmas", wishing him a "hairy chestwig and a bucket of beards".
4. "It's a Wizzleteats Kind of Christmas" – 3:51 – Stimpy sings a song about Stinky Wizzleteats, singer of the "Happy Happy Joy Joy" song; his "souped-up sausage cart" is the basis for the album cover.
5. "We're Going Shopping" – 4:39 – Stimpy drags Ren into the mall to do some Christmas shopping.
6. "Yak Shaving Day" – 4:22 – Ren and Stimpy stumble on the secret gathering place of the Gilded Yaks.
7. "What Is Christmas?" – 3:19 – Stimpy and his son, Stinky the Fart, recall the events of "Son of Stimpy".
8. "Cobb to the World" – 3:08 – Ren and Stimpy sing the song of "good king" Wilbur Cobb, a senile senior citizen, to the tune of "Joy to the World".
9. "Happy Holiday Hop" – 3:48 – Ren and Stimpy attend TV star Muddy Mudskipper's holiday celebration.
10. "I Hate Christmas" – 4:23 – While Stimpy goes to bed, Ren sings the blues about his personal disdain for the holiday.
11. "The Twelve Days of Yaksmas, Cousin's Family Sent to Me" – 4:24 – Ren and Stimpy count down the Yaksmas gifts of Ren's cousin Svën Hoek to the tune of "The Twelve Days of Christmas".
12. "Decorate Yourself" – 5:26 – Ren and Stimpy sing an anthem in the style of "We Are the World" about decorating oneself for the holidays.

== Personnel ==
- Heather Adams – production coordination
- Tom Armbruster – synthesizer, percussion, piano, arranger, keyboards, backing vocals, human whistles, finger snaps
- Al Arthur – drums
- Charlie Brissette – production, bass, arranger, backing vocals, human whistles, finger snaps
- Bob Camp – illustrations
- Kennedy Clarke – Stinky Wizzleteats
- Vanessa Coffey – percussion, backing vocals, voices, producer
- Cheryl Chase – vocals
- Phil Feather – woodwinds
- Jimmy Gomez – orchestral arrangements
- Buddy Gordon – trumpet
- Billy Harbour – drums
- Mark Hollingsworth – recorder
- Jean Jordan – director
- Eddie King – human whistles, engineer, mixing editor
- Russ Kunkel – drums
- Jim Lum – guitar
- Billy West – vocals, guitar, performer
