= Eme 15 =

Latin pop band

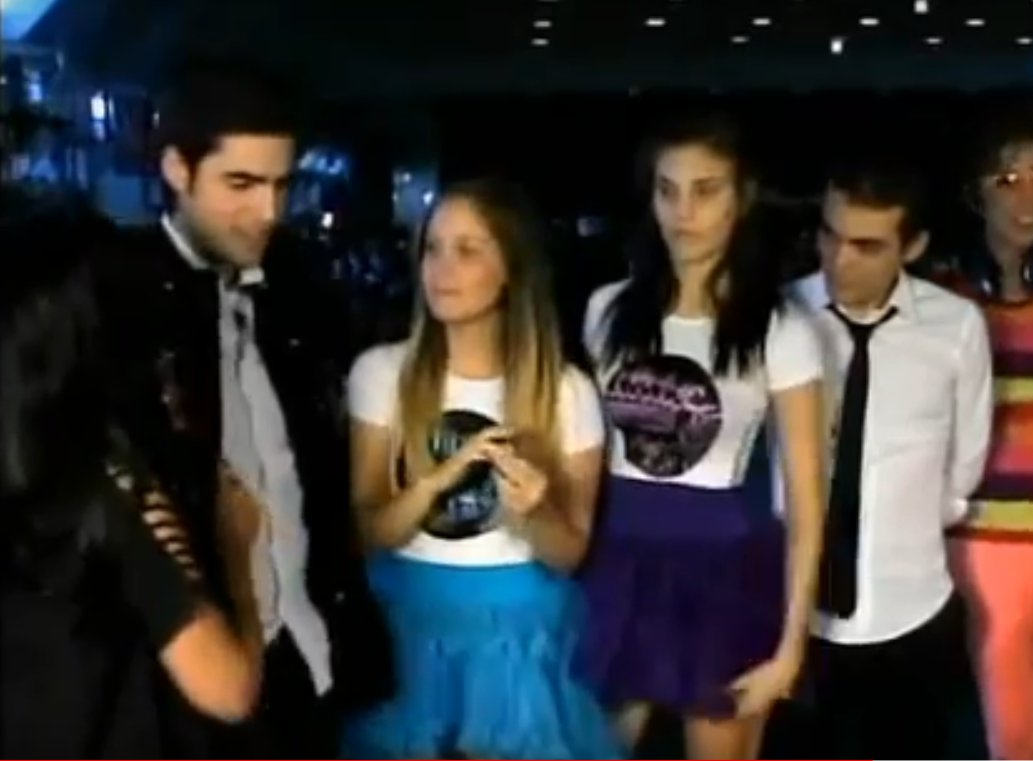
- Eme 15 in 2012

Background information
- Origin: Mexico City, Mexico
- Genres: Latin pop; pop rock; teen pop
- Years active: 2011–2014
- Labels: EMI Televisa Music; Warner Music Mexico
- Members: Macarena Achaga (vocals); Jack Duarte (bass, vocals); Natasha Dupeyrón (vocals); Eleazar Gómez (vocals, guitar); Paulina Goto (lead vocals); Yago Muñoz (guitar, vocals)
- Website: cafedecamilo.com

Eme 15 (also stylized as EME XV and M-15) was a Mexican-Argentine Latin pop band composed of the six lead actors from the 2012 Nickelodeon Latin America television series Miss XV. The band was formed for the series in Mexico City by Televisa by producer Pedro Damián in August 2011. Music for the band's album was produced and written by Carlos Lara and former pop-rock singer Lynda Thomas. The band split up following their final concert on January 5, 2014, at the Mega Feria Imperial de Acapulco in Acapulco.

== History ==
Eme 15 was composed of the six main actors of the teen telenovela, Miss XV. Originally, the band was formed with five actors, but producers held a casting search in July 2011 to find a third female member. Argentine television hostess and model Macarena Achaga was confirmed as the band's sixth member in August 2011.

Eme 15 performed songs included in the television series, Miss XV. The band made their television debut at the Mexican Kids Choice Awards in Mexico City on September 3, 2011, with their debut single, Wonderland. The single was recorded in Mexico City in August 2011 and produced by Pedro Damian. The official music video for Wonderland was filmed in October 2011 in Las Pozas, a park in Xilitla, San Luis Potosí. The music video premiered on April 4, 2012, on cafedecamilo.com Wonderland was officially released as a digital download for iTunes in Mexico on April 24, 2012. In early October 2012, the band filmed a music video on the beach for their second single, "Solamente Tú" in Acapulco, Mexico. The video premiered exclusively on MTV Latin America's website on October 29, 2012. The single was available for digital download on iTunes for Mexico on October 9, 2012.

Due to the band and Miss XV's success, Paulina Goto and Natasha Dupeyrón were revealed as co-protagonists for producer Pedro Damián's slated television series, tentatively titled, "Las Mejores Amigas: Best Friends Forever" on April 24, 2013. The program was expected to include songs performed by Eme 15 and between 80 and 100 episodes were expected to be filmed. However, production never began and the project was cancelled.

The band received two nominations for the Premios Oye! awards for Revelación en Español and Canción en Español for their single, Wonderland. The awards ceremony was held on May 16, 2013, in Mazatlan, Mexico.

=== Debut album: Eme 15 ===
Production on the band's debut album started in August 2011 in Mexico City. The band's self-titled album, Eme 15, was available for digital download and physical release internationally on June 26, 2012; one bonus track was included for iTunes Mexico purchases. The album includes 12 songs written by songwriters Carlos Lara, Lynda Thomas, and Pedro Muñoz. On June 12, 2012, A Mis Quince (Miss XV), the opening theme song for Miss XV, was available for digital download on iTunes in Mexico. The following week, on June 19, 2012, Súper Loca and Desde Tu Adiós were released digitally on iTunes in Mexico as the final promotional singles from the band's debut album. The album debuted at number 2 on the Mexican Top 100 Album Charts on July 1, 2012. It reached number one in Mexico on July 23, 2012, and was certified platinum in Mexico for sales of 60,000 or more units.

A re-release of the group's debut album includes four Christmas cover songs and two previously unreleased demos. It was released in Mexico for physical and digital download and on November 13, 2012. Within 10 days of its release, the band's Christmas re-release album was certified gold in Mexico for 30,000 sales or more. By the end of 2012, the band's debut album had spent a total of 27 weeks in the top 100 album charts in Mexico; it charted at number 17 out of 100 for the best-selling albums in Mexico for 2012.

=== Live album: Wonderland-Zona Preferente ===
On April 30, 2013, the band released their first live album, Wonderland-Zona Preferente, a concert CD and DVD combo pack. The album and DVD were recorded in front of a live audience in Mexico City at one of two shows performed at the Auditorio Nacional on January 27, 2013. The recording also featured three new songs, including the band's third official single, Diferente. The album debuted at number 6 on the Mexican album charts on May 5, 2013.

=== Touring ===
The band's earliest appearances to promote their debut album and television series, Miss XV were at autograph signings and showcases at MIXUP record store locations and radio venues throughout Mexico beginning in the spring of 2012. Eventually, the group embarked on a national tour, performing at venues and holding autograph signings across Mexico throughout 2012. The band performed four times at the Auditorio Nacional and sold out two shows in January 2013. The group gained international fame following the release of their debut album. They debuted their album, performing at smaller showcases and appearing on various television and radio programs in Colombia and Argentina in October 2012. The band performed their first full concert set outside of Mexico at the famed Teatro Gran Rex theatre in Buenos Aires, Argentina on April 28, 2013.

To promote their live album, Wonderland-Zona Preferente, the group made several appearances on television programs to perform their single, Diferente and gave radio interviews in Mexico. On September 6, 2013, the group embarked a national tour in Mexico for their album, Wonderland-Zona Preferente. They performed their first show in Mérida, Mexico. Subsequent shows also included concerts in Ciudad Victoria and Puebla, Mexico.

=== Final concerts and separation ===
The group performed their last concert with all 6 members in Mexico City on December 8, 2013, at the Pepsi Center.

On December 18, 2013, it was officially announced to fans via the band's official Twitter account that the band would split up, following their final concert on January 5, 2014, at the Mega Feria Imperial de Acapulco in Acapulco, Mexico. Achaga did not attend the final concert in Acapulco due to previously scheduled commitments.

== Members ==
Member	Birthday	Birthplace
Jack Duarte	April 7, 1986 (age 40)	Mexico City, Mexico
Eleazar Gómez	May 29, 1986 (age 40)	Mexico City, Mexico
Yago Muñoz	September 28, 1990 (age 36)	Mexico City, Mexico
Natasha Dupeyrón	June 3, 1991 (age 35)	Mexico City, Mexico
Paulina Goto	July 29, 1991 (age 35)	Monterrey, Nuevo Leon, Mexico
Macarena Achaga	March 5, 1992 (age 34)	Mar del Plata, Argentina

== Discography ==
=== Studio album ===
Title	Album details	Peak chart positions	
Title	Album details	MEX	ARG
Eme 15	Released: June 26, 2012 (Internationally); Label: Warner Music México; Formats: CD, digital download	1	1

=== Live album ===
List of soundtrack albums, with selected chart positions
Title	Album details	Peak chart positions
Title	Album details	MEX
Wonderland-Zona Preferente	Released: April 30, 2013; Label: Warner Music México; Format: CD, DVD, digital download	6

=== Singles ===
List of singles, with selected chart positions
Title	Year	Peak chart positions	Album
Title	Year	MEX	Album
"Wonderland"	2012	10	Eme 15
"Solamente Tú"	2012	—	Eme 15
"Diferente"	2013	—	Wonderland-Zona Preferente
"—" denotes releases that did not chart or were not released in that territory.

=== Promotional singles ===
Title	Year	Album
"A Mis Quince (Miss XV)"	2012	Eme 15
"Súper Loca"	2012	Eme 15
"Desde Tu Adiós"	2012	Eme 15

=== Music videos ===
- Wonderland (2012)
- Solamente Tú (2012)
- Diferente (Live at the Auditorio Nacional) (2013)
- Baila (2013)
- Te Quiero Más (2013)

== Awards and nominations ==
Year	Award	Category	Nominated work	Result
2012	Kids Choice Awards México	Grupo o Duo Latino Favorito (Favorite Latin Duo or Group)	Eme 15	Won
2012	Premios 40 Principales America	Mejor Artista o Grupo Revelación, Zona Norte (Best Artist or Group in Northern Latin America)	Eme 15	Nominated
2013	Nickelodeon Kids Choice Awards	Favorite Latin Artist	Eme 15	Nominated
2013	Premios Oye!	Revelación en Español (Best New Artist)	Eme 15	Nominated
2013	Premios Oye!	Canción en Español (Song in Spanish)	Wonderland	Nominated
