= You Eediot! (album) =

Soundtrack album

Soundtrack album by Ren and Stimpy
- Released: August 31, 1993
- Genre: Comedy rock
- Length: 39:47
- Labels: Sony, Epic
- Producers: Charlie Brissette; Vanessa Coffey

Ren and Stimpy chronology
You Eediot! (1993)	Crock O' Christmas (1993)

Professional ratings
Review scores
Source	Rating
AllMusic	4/5 stars
Entertainment Weekly	B

You Eediot! is a soundtrack album featuring tracks from Nickelodeon's animated series The Ren & Stimpy Show. It was released on August 31, 1993. Notable tracks in the album include "Kilted Yaksmen Anthem" (from "The Royal Canadian Kilted Yaksmen") and "Happy Happy Joy Joy" (from "Stimpy's Invention"). A promotional album with the tracks "Happy Happy Joy Joy", "Kilted Yaksmen Anthem" and "Don't Whiz On the Electric Fence" was sent out to radio stations across North America that September. "Fire Dogs" and "Ren's Pecs" had accompanying music videos. The album peaked at #156 on the Billboard 200 in October 1993.

Because the album was released a year after the firing of creator John Kricfalusi, Ren Höek's vocals were re-recorded by Billy West, and Bob Camp (who replaced Kricfalusi as showrunner) took his role of Stinky Wizzleteats in the album version of "Happy Happy Joy Joy".

The album's cover is a parody of the cover for The Beatles' album Abbey Road, showing Mr. Horse (in place of John Lennon), Muddy Mudskipper (in place of Ringo Starr), Stimpy (in place of Paul McCartney), and Ren (in place of George Harrison) walking across the street.

== Track listing ==
1. "The Whistler/Overture" – 0:42
2. "Dog Pound Hop" – 2:27
3. "Muddy Mudskipper Theme" – 0:42
4. "Happy Happy Joy Joy" – 1:46
5. "Fire Dogs" – 3:38
6. "Better than No One" – 4:38
7. "Nose Goblins" – 4:20
8. "Smokin'" – 3:03
9. "Log Blues/Log Theme" – 1:23
10. "Captain's Log/Space Madness" – 5:04
11. "Sven Theme" – 3:03
12. "Sven Blues" – 0:47
13. "Don't Whiz On the Electric Fence" – 1:19
14. "Ren's Pecs" – 2:52
15. "I'm Gonna Be a Monkey" – 1:28
16. "Filthy's Dance" – 0:24
17. "Jungle Boogie" – 0:18
18. "Dizzy Monkeys" – 0:29
19. "Kilted Yaksmen Anthem" – 2:47
20. "The Whistler/Underture" – 0:41
21. "Big House Blues" – 3:00
