= Jack Duarte =

Mexican actor and singer

- Born: Robert Jack Duarte Wallace; April 7, 1986 (age 40); Mexico City, Mexico
- Occupations: Actor; singer

Robert Jack Duarte Wallace (born April 7, 1986, in Mexico City, Mexico) is a Mexican actor and singer. He is known for his acting performance in the Mexican telenovela Rebelde as "Tomas Goycolea" and as a member of the Mexican-Argentine pop band, Eme 15.

== Life ==
During his time in the boy band M5, Duarte toured through various countries in Latin America including Bolivia, Peru, Ecuador, El Salvador, Costa Rica, Guatemala, and Honduras. Within five years, M5's records twice achieved platinum status in Bolivia and once in Costa Rica. Duarte was a member of the musical group, Eme 15 from 2011 until the group's separation in December 2014.

He acts in the television series, Miss XV.

== Filmography ==
- Rebelde (2004) as Tomás Goycolea
- Velo de Novia (2003) as a member of M5
- Miss XV (2012) as Eddy
