= Centro de Educación Artística =

Mexican drama school owned by Televisa

Coordinates: 19°20′38.98″N 99°12′17.29″W

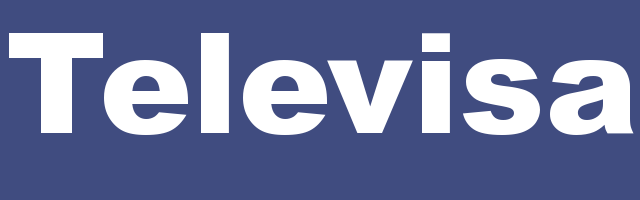
- Founded: 26 September 1978; 48 years ago
- Headquarters: Mexico City, Mexico
- Owner: Televisa
- Website: http://lasestrellas.tv/cea/

The Centro de Educación Artística (CEA) is an entertainment educational institution in Mexico run by that country's major media conglomerate, Televisa. Located at the company's facilities in the San Ángel neighborhood of Mexico City, the school was founded September 26, 1978 and is an incubator for talent working for the network's famed telenovelas, dramas and comedies, along with the Mexican film industry and beyond.

Applicants must be between 17 and 23 years of age, with a very selective process, as only 35 to 40 applicants out of around 5,000 per year are accepted to the three-year program. Tuition for the program is covered by Televisa, and consists of 45 hours per week of coursework and performances. A secondary program is available for younger actors, known as "CEA Infantil".
