= Federico Porras Jr. =

Mexican child actor

- Born: December 30, 2005 (age 20)
- Occupation: Child actor
- Years active: 2011–present

Federico Porras Jr. is a Mexican actor, known for A que no me dejas, Los Miserables and Por siempre amor.

== Career ==
Porras began studying acting at age five in the Children's Center for Arts Education Televisa (CEA Children) with Eugenio Cobo.

At the beginning of 2012, he was cast for the film ¿Qué le dijiste a Dios?, directed by Teresa Suarez. By mid-2012, he received his first big break by playing "Mateo" the son of Zuria Vega and Gabriel Soto on the hit soap opera "Un Refugio para el Amor".

He subsequently participated in productions such as La Mujer del Vendaval (Special Performance), La Rosa de Guadalupe ("Sin Miedo a Hablar" y "La Luz de la Luciérnaga"), the film Vladimir en Mí" directed by Octavio Reyes, Km 31.2 the film, Qué pobres tan richos for half of 2014 as Fede "Nachito". He performed with Alexandra de la Vega and Javier Diaz Dueñas in the telenovela Los miserables, produced by Telemundo, starring Aracely Arambula, Erik Hayser, Aylin Mujica and Aaron Diaz.

In May 2015 he began working on Televisa's telenovela A Qué No Me Dejas in the character of René.

In January 2016 Fede joined the telenovela Simplemente María portraying Juan Pablo.

== Filmography ==
=== Television ===
Years	Title	Role	Notes
2011	Una Familia con Suerte	Sebastian Jr.	La sorpresa de Tomás (2011) – La serenata de Tomás (2011)
2012	Un refugio para el amor	Mateo	29 Episodes
2013	La mujer del Vendaval		Special Performance
2013–Present	La Rosa De Guadalupe		"Sin Miedo a Hablar" "La Luz de la Luciérnaga" Various Episodes
2013	Por siempre mi amor	Esteban Niño	25 Episodes
2014	Qué Pobres Tan Ricos	Nachito	Special Participation
2014– 2015	Los Miserables	Ignacio Echeverría Durán	45 Episodes
2015–Present	Como dice el dicho	Fede Porras	Un ojo al gato y otro al garabato (2015) and Various Episodes
2015	A que no me dejas	René	41 Episodes
2016	Simplemente María	Juan Pablo	11 Episodes

=== Films ===
Year	Title	Role	Notes
2013	Vladimir en Mí		
2014	¿Qué le dijiste a Dios?	Eduardo	
