= Preso No. 1 =

American political thriller drama television series

- Genre: political thriller drama
- Written by: Luis Felipe Ybarra
- Directed by: Pitipol Ybarra; Javier Patron Fox; Javier Solar
- Starring: Erik Hayser; Alejandra Ambrosi; Alejandro de la Madrid; Mariana Seoane; Arturo Peniche; Angélica Celaya; Otto Sirgo; Guillermo Quintanilla; Fabiola Guajardo; Luis Felipe Tovar; Roberto Sosa; Damián Alcázar
- Theme music composer: Leo Dan
- Opening theme: "Como te extraño mi amor" by Pedro Fernández
- Country of origin: United States
- Original language: Spanish
- No. of seasons: 1
- No. of episodes: 44 (list of episodes)

Production
- Executive producers: Dror Mishani; Shira Hadad; Avi Nir; Karni Ziv; Kelly Wright; Marcel Ferrer; Mariana Iskandarani; Marcos Santana
- Editor: Ramiro Pardo
- Camera setup: Multi-camera
- Production companies: Keshet International; Telemundo Global Studios

Original release
- Network: Telemundo
- Release: 30 July – 27 September 2019

Preso No. 1 is an American political thriller drama television series produced by Keshet International and Telemundo Global Studios based on an original idea of idea by Shira Hadad and Dror Mishani who are also executive producers. It premiered on 30 July 2019 and ended on 27 September 2019.

The series stars Erik Hayser as imprisoned president of Mexico Carmelo Alvarado, along to Alejandra Ambrosi as the non-official First Lady of Mexico Carolina Arteaga, Alejandro de la Madrid as Bautista Fernández, Mariana Seoane as Pía Bolaños, a corrupt journalist woman, Arturo Peniche as Pedro Islas, the main villain of the history, Angélica Celaya as Miranda Collins, the second non-official First Lady of Mexico, Otto Sirgo as official president of Mexico, Guillermo Quintanilla as Ignacio Mayorga, a corrupt Colonel, Fabiola Guajardo as Carolina's young version, Luis Felipe Tovar as Hugo Piña, a corrupt commander of the police, Roberto Sosa as Ramsés Cota, the drug dealer that Carmelo extradited to the United States, and Damián Alcázar as Salvador Fraga, the owner of the newspaper El Plural.

Although Telemundo did not renew the series for a second season, the final episode of the series ended without the respective phrase "End" or "to be continue". Finishing the series with an open ending possible to produce a second season.

The first season of the series became available for streaming on 10 December 2019 on Netflix. On Netflix the series has a total of 64 episodes.

== Plot ==
Carmelo Alvarado (Erik Hayser) is 45 years old. He was born into a rural family in northern Mexico. Amancio Alvarado, Carmelo's father, came from a humble family in the state of Chiapas. When Amancio’s mother died, he went looking for her, not knowing that he would be caught in the middle of the Zapatista Conflict, in which he would die. Carmelo saw his father’s picture in a newspaper and decided to go look for his body. He was then 20 years old and never found his father.

This is how Carmelo’s journey started, the rural young man who came to work on television and who thanks to his character and intelligence, became a leader, and later, the independent candidate for the presidency. And although he neither looked for it nor wanted it, he got it. Carmelo assumed the presidency with two groups pressuring him: the Grupo Impala (wealthy men, real owners of the country), and the narcos. As president, Carmelo was toughening his speech with the simple goal of being useful in "a splendid country that could provide to all, what it denies to almost everyone."

A millionaire fraud was disclosed by Pía Bolaños (Mariana Seoane)—a journalist with many followers but low moral values—who was responsible for publishing all the false story, shaking the government and leading the Prosecutor to bring a formal accusation against the President of the Republic. The complaints were adding up, all of them prefabricated in a scenario that allowed them to be credible, to grow and multiply. This led to the arrest and imprisonment of the president. But the arrest and imprisonment of Carmelo achieved much more in society than his alleged corruption. The people reacted angrily in defense of their president, now imprisoned. With this, Carmelo became more dangerous to his enemies. Carmelo now must fight for his life, his freedom and take revenge against those who conspire to destroy him.

== Cast ==
=== Main ===
- Erik Hayser as Carmelo Alvarado
  - Alexis Valdés as Young Carmelo
- Alejandra Ambrosi as Carolina Arteaga
  - Fabiola Guajardo as Young Carolina
- Alejandro de la Madrid as Bautista Fernández
- Mariana Seoane as Pía Bolaños
- Arturo Peniche as Pedro Islas
- Angélica Celaya as Miranda Collins
- Otto Sirgo as Benito Rivas
- Guillermo Quintanilla as Ignacio Mayorga
- Luis Felipe Tovar as Hugo Piña
- Roberto Sosa as Ramsés Cota "El Faraón"
  - Jorge Caballero as Young Ramsés
- Damián Alcázar as Salvador Fraga

=== Recurring ===
- Emilio Guerrero as Toño
- Fernando Ciangherotti as Guido Espinosa Palao
- Luis Gatica as Adonis Madrigal
- Roberto Ballesteros as Dagoberto Lazcano
- Carmen Beato as Hortensia
- Aldo Gallardo as Joe Moreno
- Eduardo Victoria as Francisco Canales
  - Luis Casan as Young Francisco
- Erick Chapa as Juan Islas Limantour
- Claudio Lafarga as Emanuel Porrúa
  - Leonardo Álvarez as Young Emanuel
- Diego Klein as Evodio Alvarado "El Tuerto"
  - Iván Amozurrutia as Young Evodio
- Tomás Goros as Captain Segovia
- David Ostrosky as Belisario Garcia Ponce de León
- Paulina Matos as Sara Alvarado Arteaga
- Estefanía Coppola as Isabel Alvarado
- Laura Palma as Jacinta
- Rocío Verdejo as Rita Franco
  - Macarena Miguel as Young Rita
- Luz Ramos as Clara Nevares
- Ale Müller as Diana García Nevares
- Claudia Pineda as Amalia
- Thanya López as Eva
- Rodrigo Oviedo as Adán
- Zamia Fandiño as Gina
- Jaime del Águila as Claudio Travulse
- Juan Martín Jauregui as Ricardo Montero
- Magali Boyselle as Josefina
- Orlando Moguel as Amador
- Luciana Silveyra as Virginia Carranza
- Carlos Hays as Federico Iturbe
- Patricio Gallardo as Jaime Bracamontes
- Iñaki Goci as El Tinajas
- Mikel Mateos as Plácido Alvarado

== Production ==
The series was presented and announced during the Telemundo Upfront for the 2018–2019 television season as Prisionero número uno. And later announced at the 2018 LA Screenings. The production of the series began on 29 January 2019 on the beaches of the Municipality of Villa de Allende. 200 extras were summoned to go to the production, which culminated on 2 February 2019 in that town to later continue in other states of Mexico. Filming was supervised by the director of Argos Comunicación Terry Fernández Rivas, together with Irving Aranda Ocampo. It is a production of Telemundo Global Studios, co-developed with Keshet International, creators of the successful series Prisoners of War, on which Homeland is based. The production is written by Luis Felipe Ybarra, directed by Pitipol Ybarra, Javier Patrón Fox and Javier Sola. In addition, executive production was provided by Marcos Santana, Mariana Iskandarani and Marcel Ferrer by Telemundo, and Dror Mishani with Shira Hadad, Avi Nir, Karni Ziv and Kelly Wright as executive producers for Keshet International. The series that was stipulated to have 60 episodes, was filmed entirely in Mexico City, and its surroundings. They even used the old Senate headquarters, in the Historic Center, for the series.

The series was created based on venturing into a new television genre such as political thriller and changing the direction of the "narconovelas", Erik Hayser, Arturo Peniche and Alejandra Ambrosi explained the need for new [heroic figures] to appear in the small screen. The story shows the beginnings of the protagonists with political activism since the Zapatista Revolution of 1994 in the Mexican state of Chiapas, and develops the action in different parts of Mexico and the United States.

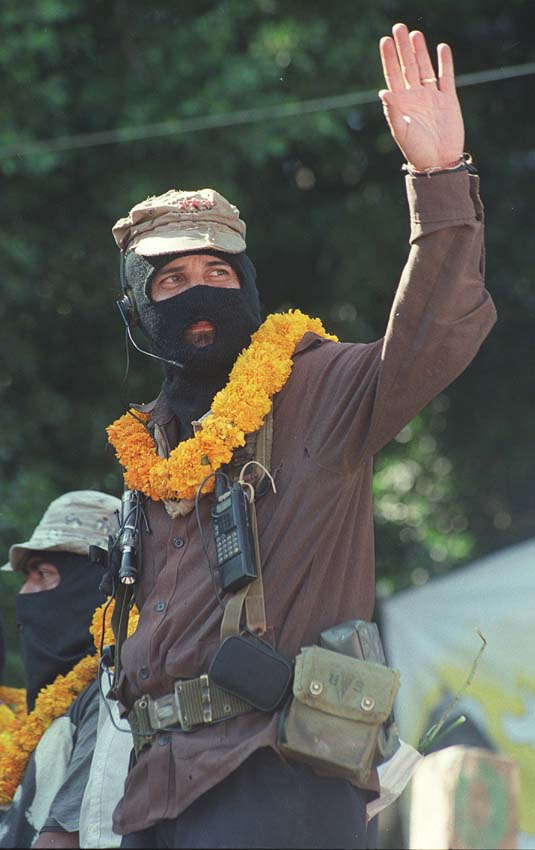
Subcomandante Marcos (left) and Ernesto Guevara (right) they were some of the political figures that were inspired to create Carmelo Alvarado.

Erik Hayser, who had subsequently filmed the series trailer, was chosen as the main protagonist of the series, and for the creation of his character he was inspired by political figures such as Eduardo Galeano and the Subcomandante Marcos. Although it is not the first time that Hayser plays a Mexican president, he had already played a president in the Netflix series Ingobernable, along to Kate del Castillo. Regarding his participation in the political drama, the actor emphasized the governors of different countries and commented that: "It is difficult to believe that now the audience is about to meet an [innocent President] who ends up in jail and that therefore he ends up looking like a hero, something hard to believe and far from a current reality". According to Hayser, the series shows a different hero from those already known on Telemundo's screen as drug traffickers as are Aurelio Casillas of El Señor de los Cielos, and Teresa Mendonza of La Reina del Sur.

For the preparation of Carmelo Alvarado, Hayser read several books about the history of Mexico and subsequent presidents. He also prepared himself by reading the story of Ernesto Guevara, better known as Che Guevara, and the history of the Cuban revolution. In addition to Hayser, Arturo Peniche who had been away from Telemundo for 10 years, since his last telenovela Victoria, returned to the network as part of the main cast of the series playing Pedro Islas, whom the actor described as "A character full of nuances because it is dark, transparent, manipulative, egocentric, superb".

=== Music ===
The main theme of the series is "Como te extraño mi amor" by singer Leo Dan. It is the second production generated in Mexico where a tribute is paid to the artist born in Atamisqui Station. The previous one was Roma, an award-winning film by Alfonso Cuarón. The song is performed by Pedro Fernández, who had been away from the [melodramas] for years, since his last participation in Hasta el fin del mundo.

== Reception ==
Viewership and ratings per season of Preso No. 1
Season	Timeslot (ET)	Episodes	First aired		Last aired		Avg. viewers (millions)
Season	Timeslot (ET)	Episodes	Date	Viewers (millions)	Date	Viewers (millions)	Avg. viewers (millions)
1	Mon–Fri 10:00 pm	44	30 July 2019	1.33	27 September 2019	0.92	0.94

The series premiered with a total of 1.33 million viewers, being the most watched show at 10 pm/9c on Telemundo. And surpassing its closest competition Sin miedo a la verdad of Univision. Although the series debuted with a good average, it failed to exceed the 2 million audience that had its predecessor La Reina del Sur. Despite having had a successful premiere occupying the number 1 spot in the network, the series failed to average a good audience during its first month on the air.

== Awards and nominations ==
Year	Award	Category	Nominated	Result
2020	International Emmy Award	Best Non-English Language U.S. Primetime Program	Preso No.1	Nominated
