= Los miserables (2014 TV series) =

- Genre: Telenovela
- Created by: Valentina Párraga
- Based on: Les Misérables by Victor Hugo
- Written by: Yoyiana Ahumada; Gerardo Cadena; Cristina Policastro; Arturo González Yánez; Valentina Párraga
- Story by: Valentina Párraga
- Directed by: Víctor Herrera McNaught; Carlos Villegas Rosales
- Starring: Aracely Arámbula; Erik Hayser; Aylín Mújica; Gabriel Porras; Aarón Díaz; Marco Treviño
- Theme music composer: Caridad Castañeda
- Opening theme: "Los miserables" performed by Aracely Arámbula
- Countries of origin: Mexico; United States
- Original language: Spanish
- No. of episodes: 119

Production
- Executive producers: Martha Godoy; Joshua Mintz; Araceli Sánchez Mariscal
- Producer: Marco Antonio López
- Cinematography: Jorge Rubio Cazarín; Juan Bernardo; Sánchez Mejía
- Editors: Francisco Nogueras; Arley Parra; Horacio Valle
- Camera setup: Multi-camera
- Production companies: Argos Comunicación; Telemundo Studios

Original release
- Network: Telemundo
- Release: September 30, 2014 – March 24, 2015

Los miserables (English: Les Misérables) is a telenovela that premiered on Telemundo on September 30, 2014, and concluded on March 24, 2015. The telenovela was produced by Argos Comunicación and Telemundo Studios, distributed by Telemundo Internacional and created by the Venezuelan author Valentina Párraga, based on the 1862 French novel Les Misérables written by Victor Hugo.

It starred Aracely Arámbula as Lucía Durán - A woman pursued by law but innocent, who has to resist, fight and hide tenaciously and cunningly, until she demonstrates her integrity. Other cast members included Erik Hayser, Aylín Mújica, Gabriel Porras and Marco Treviño, along with Aarón Díaz as a special guest star.

== Plot ==
Lucia Durán (Lucha) leaves prison in Texas where she served 11 years of her sentence, with the frustration of paying for a crime she did not commit. Her cellmate Rosalia Pérez, on her deathbed, entrusts Lucia to take charge of Roxana, her 10-year-old daughter living in Mexico City. Lucia is deported from Texas with a nursing degree obtained in prison. In Mexico City, dreaming of reuniting with her family, Lucia is received by Liliana Duran, her younger sister, who reminds her that she is the shame of the family, although Liliana knows that the tragedy of her sister started it. Meanwhile, they agree that Lucia is alone in this life and Lucia begins a long ordeal to find work and the girl that she promised to protect.

The handsome and masculine chief of the anti-narcotics department, Daniel Ponce, never has trouble getting occasional lovers, but isn't keen on lasting relationships. He seems cold and cynical, while he boasts of being fair and impartial. He relentlessly tracks evildoers, as in each of the criminals he sees his mother's killers.

Daniel, in his fight against drug trafficking and Marrero, the head of a drug cartel, directs an operation to catch a trafficking ring in a popular neighborhood, which injures both policemen and traffickers. Meanwhile, Lucia goes to a charity hospital to apply for a job. Shortly after, the wounded cop from Daniel's operation arrives. Trained for action, Lucia starts to help the poor staff of nurses and doctors, until Daniel arrives with orders and threats. Lucia confronts him and Daniel angrily asserts himself. Sister Amparo Ponce, seeing the ugly behavior of her nephew, decides to give Lucia a try, despite her unruly past. After getting the job, Lucia starts to seek Roxana, the daughter of Rosalia. Meanswhile, a very handsome, hardworking and a very well experienced police officer named Julian from another city arrives, and starts working with Daniel. Julian is the step-brother of Olegario Marrero, but he is completely against him, and always goes and talks to him to stop the dirty work. But Marrero refuses. Julian falls in love with Lucia, and Lucia also starts to fall for him, but he feels bad for Daniel, and he cuts the relationship. Julian is also poor because he lost his son Thomas in car-accident and he is broken from this ordeal. In addition, the Court did not charge the man who killed his son. Then there is Pablo Riobueno who is an undercover police officer who works as a farmer in Radames Echeveria's House. He falls in love with Radames's wife Helena and has a relationship with her.

== Production ==
The telenovela was filmed in Mexico. Mintz also indicated that soon reveal the names of the actors and producers and the rest of the team to be in this production. Arambula clarified that the new melodrama will not be a carbon copy of the novel. "Are you based in Les Misérables, but is adapted for television. It is not time, is now only based on history [everyone knows]. We will not make Los Miserables [always]," she said. Arambula confirmed she wanted to return to the small screen with a different role of "La Patrona" in the drama of the soap will be Miserable. It also confirms that she will return to work with the same production team "La Patrona". Said Marcos Santana, president of Telemundo International, Monday in a press conference in Cannes, France. "We are very proud because it comes from another great production that will anticipate our label and have excellent ratings". The telenovela production began in April 2014.

== Cast ==
=== Main ===
- Aracely Arámbula as Lucía "Lucha" Durán Monteagudo
- Erik Hayser as Daniel Ponce
- Aylín Mújica as Liliana Durán Monteagudo "La Diabla"
- Gabriel Porras as Olegario Marrero "El Diablo" / Rafael Montes killed by Liliana Duran
- Aarón Díaz as César Mondragón
- Marco Treviño as Ignacio Durán
- Julian Moreno as Julian Ferreira "el Hierro"

=== Recurring ===
- Alexandra de la Mora as Helena Durán Monteagudo
- Aldo Gallardo as Carlos Gallardo
- Diego Soldano as Pablo Riobueno
- Bianca Calderón as Deyanira Paredes
- Claudio Lafarga as Dr. Gonzalo Mallorca
- Estela Calderón as Déborah Echeverría
- Thanya López as Marisela León
- Macarena Oz as Roxana Pérez
- Gabo Anguiano as Guillermo Orlandes "Memin"
- Luis Uribe as Genaro Cabello
- Verónica Terán as Sor Amparo Ponce
- María Barbosa as Fernanda Monteagudo de Durán
- Gina Varela as Nancy
- Anastasia as Consuelo Durán Monteagudo
- Manola Diez as Ivanna Echeverría
- Alex Camargo as Abel Durán Mondragón
- Eva Daniela as Victoria "Vicky" Gordillo Durán
- Alberto Sanchez as Thomas Ferrera/Julian's son Killed by Genaro
- Dave Douglas as Octavio Mondragón Echeverría
- Rodrigo Vidal as Gastón Gordillo
- Javier Díaz Dueñas as Radamés Echeverría

=== Guest ===
- Gonzalo García Vivanco as Pedro Morales
- Elsy Reyes as Nuria Pérez
- Juan Martín Jauregui as Evaristo Rodríguez
- Federico Porras Jr. as Ignacio "Nachito" Echeverría Durán
- Geraldine Zinat as Sor Milagros
- Luis Yeverino as Gustavo Millán
- Tatiana Martínez as Soraya
- Eduardo Reza as Alejandro Verde

== Awards and nominations ==
Year	Association	Category	Nominated	Result
2014	People en Español	Best telenovela	Los miserables	Nominated
2014	People en Español	Galanazo del año	Erik Hayser	Nominated
2014	People en Español	Best on-screen chemistry	Aracely Arámbula and Erik Hayser	Nominated
2014	People en Español	Best Female Antagonist	Aylín Mujica	Nominated
2014	People en Español	Best Male Antagonist	Gabriel Porras	Nominated
2015	Premios Tu Mundo	Novela of the Year	Los miserables	Nominated
2015	Premios Tu Mundo	Favorite Lead Actor - Novela	Erik Hayser	Nominated
2015	Premios Tu Mundo	Favorite Lead Actress - Novela	Aracely Arámbula	Nominated
2015	Premios Tu Mundo	The Best Actor with Bad Luck	Aracely Arámbula	Nominated
2015	Premios Tu Mundo	The Best Bad Boy - Novela	Gabriel Porras	Nominated
2015	Premios Tu Mundo	The Best Bad Girl - Novela	Aylin Mujica	Nominated
2015	Premios Tu Mundo	Best Supporting Actress - Novela	Alexandra de la Mora	Nominated
2015	Premios Tu Mundo	Best Supporting Actor - Novela	Diego Soldano	Nominated
2015	Premios Tu Mundo	Best Supporting Actor - Novela	Javier Díaz Dueñas	Nominated
2015	Premios Tu Mundo	The Perfect Couple	Aracely Arámbula & Erik Hayser	Nominated

== See also ==
- Adaptations of Les Misérables
