= Aylín Mújica =

Cuban actress, model, and ballet dancer

Aylin Mujica
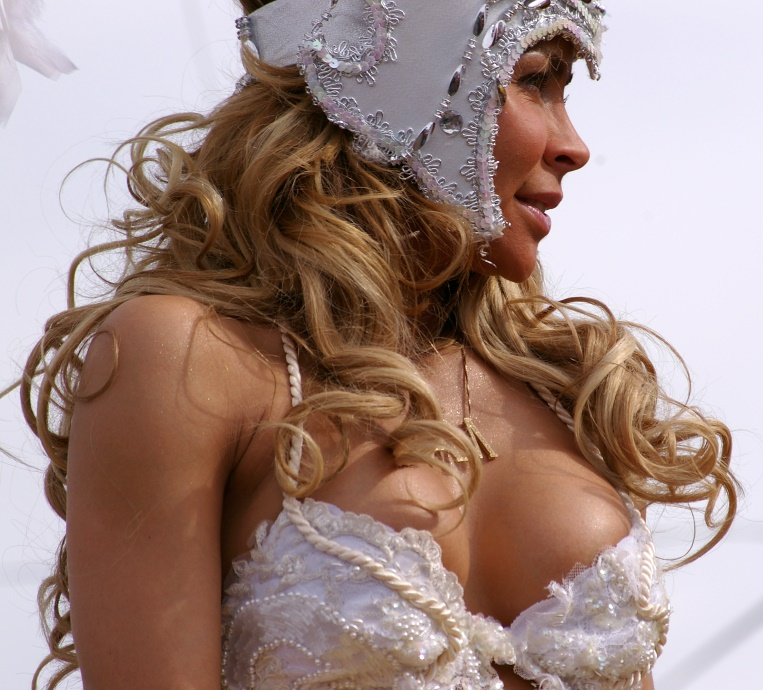
- Aylín in 2007
- Born: Aylín Mujica; November 24, 1974 (age 51); Havana, Cuba
- Occupations: Actress, Model, Dancer
- Years active: 1996–present
- Spouse: Osamu Menéndez (divorced) Alejandro Gavira (divorced) Gabriel Valenzuela (2010–2012)
- Children: 3

Aylín Mújica Ricard more commonly known as Aylín Mújica (Spanish pronunciation: [ajˈlim ˈmuxika] born November 24, 1974) is a Cuban actress, model, and ballet dancer who lives in Miami, Florida, United States.

== Career ==
Aylín began at the age of 8 years old. She studied folk dance, classical ballet, choreography, and music at la Escuela Nacional de Ballet. At 18 years old she began studying at el Instituto Superior de Artes where she studied dramatic art and at 18 years old she studied at la Escuela Internacional de Cine in Havana, Cuba.

In 1992 she traveled to Mexico to start her career. She started to work as a model in commercials for television and videoclips for artists such as Marcelo Cezán, Willy Chirino, Albita Rodríguez, and others.

The actress posed nude in the Spanish magazine Interviú and appeared in a photoshoot in the magazine H para Hombres. In 2010, nude photos of her came out in which she was already pregnant with her daughter, Violeta.

In 2006, the actress began working for Telemundo. She was offered the role of the villain in Pecados ajenos, but declined and was replaced by Catherine Siachoque. She worked in the Telemundo soap opera "Aurora" in 2010.

In 2012 she played the main antagonist in Telemundo's Corazón valiente, interpreting Fernanda del Castillo or Victoria when she faked her death.

In 2014 she played the antagonist to Gabriel Porras in the soap opera Los miserables, whose main characters were Aracely Arambula y Erik Hayser.

== Personal life ==
On September 24, 2010, Mújica married actor Gabriel Valenzuela with whom she has a daughter, Violeta, born on April 6, 2010. During the summer of 2012 Aylin and Gabriel announced their divorce.

== Filmography ==
Film
Year	Title	Role	Notes
1994	El jinete de acero	Gloria	
1995	El castrado	Doctora	
1995	Los cómplices del infierno		
2006	Mi amor secreto		
2007	A propósito de Alexa	Elisa	
2015	Desde dentro	Carmen Altamirano	

Television
Year	Title	Role	Notes
1995	La dueña	Fabiola Hernández Bustamante	Recurring Role
1996	Canción de amor	Estrella González	Recurring Role
1998	Señora	Isabel Fernández / Isabel Valencia Santacruz	Series regular
1999	Yacaranday	Yacaranday / Mónica Robles	Main role
1999–2000	Háblame de amor	Lucía Velázquez	Recurring Role
2002	Agua y aceite	Déborah Ríos	Series regular
2004–2005	La heredera	Lorena Beatriz Madero Grimaldi	Co-Protagonist
2006–2007	Marina	Laura Saldívar Castaño / Verónica Saldívar Castaño	Series regular
2008–2009	Sin senos no hay paraíso	Lorena Magallanes	Special Participation
2009–2010	Niños ricos, pobres padres	Verónica Ríos de la Torre	Series regular
2010–2011	Aurora	Vanessa Miller Quintana	Series regular
2012–2013	Corazón valiente	Fernanda del Castillo / Victoria Villafañe	Series regular
2014–2015	Los miserables	Liliana Durán Monteagudo "La Diabla"	Series regular
2018	La bella y las bestias	María Estela González "La Madame"	Series regular
2020	Como tú no hay 2	Oriana Jasso Murillo	Series regular
2022	Amores que engañan	Diana	Episode 3: "Derecho a ser feliz"
2022–24	Secretos de villanas	Herself	Main cast
2023	La casa de los famosos	Herself	Housemate (season 3)
2023	Juego de mentiras	Rocío Jimenez	
2025	Velvet: El nuevo imperio	Gloria Olivera de Márquez	
2026	Top Chef VIP	Herself	Contestant (season 5)

== Awards ==
=== ACE Awards ===
Year	Category	Movie	Result
1996	Latin Revelation of the Year	La dueña	Won

=== Golden Sun Awards ===
Year	Category	Movie	Result
1996	Revelation Youth Actress	La dueña	Won

=== New York Latin ACE Awards 1999 ===
Category	Telenovela	Result
Major Actress	Señora	Won

=== Your World Awards ===
Year	Category	Telenovela	Result
2012	The Best Bad Girl	Aurora	Nominated
2012	The Best Bad Girl	Corazón valiente	Won
2015	The Best Bad Girl	Los miserables	Nominated

=== Premios People en Español ===
Year	Category	Telenovela	Result
2012	Major Villain	Corazón valiente	Nominated

=== Miami Life Awards ===
Year	Category	Telenovela	Result
2013	Best Female Telenovela Villain	Corazón valiente	Nominated
