= List of Preso No. 1 episodes =

Preso No. 1 is an American political thriller drama television series produced by Keshet International and Telemundo Global Studios based on an original idea of idea by Shira Hadad and Dror Mishani who are also executive producers. It premiered on 30 July 2019 and ended on 27 September 2019.

== Episodes ==
No.	Title	Original release date	U.S. viewers (millions)
1	"Encarcelado"	30 July 2019	1.33
The president of Mexico, Carmelo Alvarado, goes to prison accused of corruption and abuse of power. They want him dead. His former lover, Virginia, has the key to release him, but does not present the evidence.
2	"Las mujeres del presidente"	31 July 2019	1.18
Three women marked Carmelo Alvarado, but only one is the love of his life: Carolina Arteaga. She will use her best weapons, as a journalist, to prove his innocence.
3	"Sentencia de muerte"	1 August 2019	1.14
Carmelo Alvarado must stop being a problem, so the narco Ramsés Cota, aka El Faraón will be repatriated to Mexico to liquidate the president.
4	"El oscuro secreto"	2 August 2019	0.93
Bad memories torment Carolina. Twenty-two years later, she plans to reveal his best kept secret to the president so that hate feeds his fighting spirit.
5	"Magnicidio, la misión"	5 August 2019	1.06
El Tuerto, one of Faraón's men, throws a smoke bomb and attacks the president. In the middle of the fight, Carmelo Alvarado recognizes his aggressor and draws strength to defend himself as he can.
6	"Mensajera"	6 August 2019	1.11
Carmelo wants to escape from prison and to achieve this he seeks allies. His old friend, Claudio, takes advantage of Carolina's visit to the prison to send him a very important message.
7	"Las claves de la libertad"	7 August 2019	1.06
Carmelo concludes that in jail cunning is more effective than force. He recovers the book where a message appears that he manages to decipher and a revealing image that could change his destiny.
8	"El hallazgo"	8 August 2019	1.03
The path to the showers becomes a thorough exploration, but Carmelo does not take long to discover what he was looking for.
9	"A rey muerto, rey Tuerto"	9 August 2019	0.97
El Tuerto is a monster that shows his worst face in a fierce fight with El Tinajas, another man of El Faraón. Carmelo discovers the animal instinct that lives in his brother's body.
10	"A los pies del Faraón"	12 August 2019	0.98
Ramsés Cota arrives at the San Buenaventura prison. The guards accommodate his requests, provide comfort and food. He requires inside information. Carmelo makes a life or death decision.
11	"Orden de ejecución"	13 August 2019	0.92
Carmelo is on his way to freedom, but alerts are triggered in prison and Adonis Madrigal orders to kill him. Batista tries to make him see that he will die like a hero.
12	"Abuso de poder"	14 August 2019	0.95
Colonel Ignacio Mayorga interrogates the president's alleged accomplices for the escape. He executes one of them in front of Carmelo and holds him responsible for the death.
13	"Tratos en el infierno"	15 August 2019	0.95
Carmelo meets the new prison director, called Piña, and cannot mention the execution. Carmelo's daughter, Sara, appears in a video that leaves him disconsolate.
14	"Arde San Buenaventura"	16 August 2019	0.79
The news of the bombing in Tepito is known in the prison. Inmates take control and threaten Carmelo. Piña gives the order and the blood runs.
15	"Emboscada al presidente"	19 August 2019	0.95
After the riot, Ramses Coya and Carmelo Alvarado face off with men from all sides. El Tuerto, against his own brother, must participate and demonstrate his loyalty to the drug trafficker.
16	"Atrapados"	20 August 2019	0.93
Salvador, Carolina and Carmelo cannot leave, they are in the middle of an uncontrolled shooting. Secrets and truths come to light.
17	"Plan macabro"	21 August 2019	0.95
The president feels a lot of hatred for Ramsés Cota and gets his friend in prison to give him a gun. He tells him that he does not want to know the details and that killing will sink him in jail.
18	"Pelea a muerte"	22 August 2019	1.01
Carmelo seizes the opportunity and attacks Ramsés. The revolt in the prison is unstoppable. El Tuerto is unable to stop the fury of the president.
19	"El verdadero asesino"	23 August 2019	0.93
Surveillance videos do not lie and serve to identify the criminal. The investigation of the case in San Buenaventura is in the hands of the Public Ministry and Carmelo does not know where he is being taken.
20	"Masacre"	26 August 2019	1.00
Carmelo's family fears the worst. Carmelo knows that he will be transferred by order of Benito Rivas. Masked and armed, a group of uniformed men shoot at the truck where Carmelo travels.
21	"Locura en el paraíso"	27 August 2019	0.93
Carmelo arrives in the Colonia, but nothing guarantees his life. It is a prison without bars, on an island, where Captain Segovia shows his character when welcoming him. Clara warns him of danger.
22	"El diablo uniformado"	28 August 2019	0.86
It could be Carmelo's last night in Colonia enjoying all his rights. Also, a good reason for Segovia to invite him to try Clara's delights
23	"Pecado mortal"	29 August 2019	0.95
Carmelo and Clara take refuge in a corner of the Marias Islands, where temptation and passion overflow. In addition, Captain Segovia, alcoholic and armed, is ready to end the two.
24	"Maniobras truculentas"	30 August 2019	0.77
Pedro Islas Cardán gets his way and celebrates the judge's ruling against Carmelo Alvarado, who is killed in life and annulled to return to the presidency. Rivas takes a bloody measure.
25	"La despedida"	2 September 2019	0.82
On the beach and alone, Carmelo renounces life and leaves a note for his daughters. The most valuable thing for him was to spend time with them. Although he fears the sea and does not know how to swim, he enters the water.
26	"Doble castigo"	3 September 2019	0.92
Clara is in prison, accused of murder. She has a deep pain in her soul because she could not see her daughter. Diana, a young journalist, is eager to interview President Alvarado.
27	"Donde hubo fuego..."	4 September 2019	0.94
Without premeditation and after so many years, Carmelo and Carolina spend the night together. At dawn, Captain Segovia is responsible for ruining what looked like a honeymoon.
28	"La tortura"	5 September 2019	0.85
Segovia mercilessly hits Carmelo. His talks on the right to land cost him blood, sweat and tears. But worse is the punishment when he learns that his family is in danger.
29	"Traicionera"	6 September 2019	0.72
Everything is ready for Carmelo to leave jail in two days. The plan reaches the ears of his enemies, determined to kill him before he runs away.
30	"La jugada política"	9 September 2019	0.97
Before leaving Islas Marías, Carolina and Carmelo say goodbye as two lovers. He makes a proposal and, although it seems crazy, she promises to think about it.
31	"Tiro al blanco"	10 September 2019	0.94
Carmelo takes her first steps towards freedom. El Gringo is ready to shoot the plane where the president is traveling. Carolina writes a chronicle of what is behind the escape plan.
32	"La sombra del pasado"	11 September 2019	0.91
Carmelo, a fugitive and accused of the victims of the plane, hides in his hometown. Amalia, after almost 23 years, has much more to tell than he can imagine.
33	"Sangre de mi sangre"	12 September 2019	0.96
Gringo's obsession has no limits and Sara pays the consequences. The news spreads like gunpowder. The enemies of Carmelo already think about the next play.
34	"A la caza del presidente"	13 September 2019	0.82
Carmelo loses his head knowing that Sara was stabbed. He risks it all as long as he goes to see his daughter. An operative to catch Alvarado finds armed resistance.
35	"El pacto"	16 September 2019	0.89
Carmelo ends the hunt. He sends a message that revives the memory of his followers and warns that nothing is lost, everything is to be won. Carolina is ready to take on the challenge.
36	"La candidata"	17 September 2019	0.76
Carmelo's legacy is in the hands of Carolina Arteaga, who without hesitation launches her candidacy. Upon learning, the president contacts his ex and his daughters. The call is intercepted and Carmelo is located.
37	"Ataque sangriento"	18 September 2019	0.88
The target is Carmelo and the explosion is so large that there are lows from side and side. Clara is in the middle of the confrontation. Mayorga and El Gringo go to the hospital.
38	"La prueba del delito"	19 September 2019	0.94
The death of Pía Bolaños is what everyone is talking about. Carolina Arteaga is the main suspect and her political enemies play the best card they have to sink her: manipulate the press.
39	"Las telarañas del poder"	20 September 2019	0.80
Rivas receives a report of the day Pía Bolaños was killed and Carolina Arteaga is the target. Law enforcement break into the university, where Carolina dazzles with her speech.
40	"Guerra sucia"	23 September 2019	0.91
The pressure reaches its highest level. Rivas Macín is hit where it hurts the most. Carolina is politically annulled and the other candidate comes out in her defense without measuring the consequences.
41	"Las pistas del asesino"	24 September 2019	0.90
A new victim appears and the attack has the same characteristics as the crime of Pía Bolaños. Diana is about to publish on the front page, what may free Carolina Arteaga.
42	"Sara busca venganza"	25 September 2019	0.83
President Alvarado's daughters take refuge in a cabin, where El Gringo comes to look for them. Gagged, Sara takes him to a lonely forest, while Isabel takes care of the children.
43	"Polizones"	26 September 2019	0.83
The Alvarado sisters, fugitives, flee in a truck. El Gringo pursues them to blackmail Carmelo. Father Aguirre pays for having protected one of them.
44	"El país a sus pies"	27 September 2019	0.92
A massive concentration cries out for justice. Rivas Macín declares that Carmelo is innocent. Mayorga gives the order to kill Carmelo in public and El Gringo has him in his sights.
