= Buscando a Frida =

American telenovela

- Genre: Drama
- Created by: Sandra Velasco
- Based on: ¿Dónde está Elisa? by Pablo Illanes
- Written by: Alejandro Vergara; Felipe Silva; Gisela Labrada; Sandra Velasco
- Directed by: Carlos Villegas; Felipe Aguilar; Mauricio Corredor
- Creative director: Juan Marcos Blanco
- Starring: Eduardo Santamarina; Ximena Herrera; Arap Bethke
- Theme music composer: Alain José Gómez Regla; Luis Daniel González Hurtado; Carlos Jorge García Orellana
- Opening theme: "Balcón" by Famasloop feat. Luis Jiménez
- Country of origin: United States
- Original language: Spanish
- No. of seasons: 1
- No. of episodes: 84

Production
- Executive producers: Mónica Francesca Vizzi; Ximena Cantuarias; Karen Barroeta; Marcos Santana
- Production companies: Argos Comunicación; Telemundo Global Studios

Original release
- Network: Telemundo
- Release: 26 January – 24 May 2021

Buscando a Frida (English title: The Search for Frida) is an American telenovela that aired on Telemundo from 26 January 2021 to 24 May 2021. It is based on the 2009 Chilean telenovela ¿Dónde está Elisa? created by Pablo Illanes, which Telemundo had adapted in 2010 with the same title. It stars Eduardo Santamarina, Ximena Herrera, and Arap Bethke.

Buscando a Frida won an International Emmy Award for Best Non-English Language U.S. Primetime Program.

== Plot ==
The series revolves around the Pons family and how their lives suddenly changed when their daughter, Frida, mysteriously disappears on the night of her father's birthday party. During the investigation, lies, resentments, and secrets come out, turning everyone into suspects and unmasking a family that is far from perfect.

== Cast ==
An extensive cast list was published on 30 September 2020 in a press release.

=== Main ===
- Eduardo Santamarina as Abelardo Pons
- Ximena Herrera as Marcela Bribiesca de Pons
- Arap Bethke as Martín Cabrera
- Alejandra Barros as Rafaela Pons de Terán
- Rubén Zamora as Salvador Terán
- Fabiola Guajardo as Silvia Cantú
- Jorge Luis Moreno as Ángel Olvera
- Grettell Valdez as Gabriela Pons de Carmona
- Alberto Casanova as Antonio Carmona
- Gloria Peralta as Fiscal Julieta Zambrano
- Karla Carrillo as Sasha Caballero
- Germán Bracco as Diego Carmona Pons
- Jorge Luis Vázquez as Enrique Arteaga
- Axel Arenas as Detective Robles
- Mayra Sierra as Amanda
- Victoria White as Frida Pons Bribiesca
- Ximena Martínez as Ingrid Terán Pons
- Mikel Mateos as Tomas Terán Pons
- Tamara Guzmán as Rosita
- Ivanna Castro as Carolina Pons Bribiesca
- Valery Sais as Laura Pons Bribiesca
- Roberto Ballesteros as Fabio Pedroza

== Episodes ==
No.	Title	Original release date	U.S. viewers (millions)	Rating (18–49)
1	"Misteriosa desaparición"	26 January 2021	1.20	0.5
2	"El secreto de Abelardo"	27 January 2021	1.09	0.4
3	"Sube la apuesta"	28 January 2021	1.08	0.3
4	"Secuestro virtual"	29 January 2021	0.94	0.3
5	"La denuncia"	1 February 2021	1.05	0.4
6	"Diego es sospechoso"	2 February 2021	1.06	0.4
7	"Los primos en problemas"	3 February 2021	1.02	0.3
8	"Escándalo"	4 February 2021	0.94	0.3
9	"De cara a la verdad"	5 February 2021	1.00	0.3
10	"Surgen más pistas"	8 February 2021	1.04	0.4
11	"La cabaña"	9 February 2021	0.98	0.3
12	"La sombra del pasado"	10 February 2021	1.07	0.3
13	"Marcela se fuga"	11 February 2021	0.96	0.3
14	"Tráfico de menores"	12 February 2021	0.96	0.3
15	"La crisis de los Pons"	15 February 2021	0.96	0.3
16	"Una agradable sorpresa"	16 February 2021	1.00	TBA
17	"Malas noticias"	17 February 2021	0.99	TBA
18	"Tentaciones"	18 February 2021	0.82	TBA
19	"Una llamada, una esperanza"	19 February 2021	0.96	0.3
20	"Desconfianza"	22 February 2021	1.04	0.3
21	"Señales de vida"	23 February 2021	0.97	0.3
22	"Las armas de Salvador"	24 February 2021	1.08	0.3
23	"La presión aumenta"	25 February 2021	1.00	0.3
24	"Toma el toro por los cachos"	26 February 2021	0.96	0.3
25	"Se desbordan los engaños"	1 March 2021	1.03	0.4
26	"Es hora del canje"	2 March 2021	0.95	0.3
27	"Agonía que mata"	3 March 2021	1.02	0.3
28	"Los últimos cinco días"	4 March 2021	1.00	0.4
29	"Todo apunta a Abelardo"	5 March 2021	1.04	0.3
30	"Coincidencia"	8 March 2021	1.07	0.4
31	"Soborno"	9 March 2021	1.05	0.3
32	"Reacciona Martín, reacciona"	10 March 2021	1.03	0.3
33	"Cartas a su favor"	11 March 2021	1.05	0.3
34	"Pescar en río revuelto"	12 March 2021	1.00	0.3
35	"Sabueso"	15 March 2021	1.06	0.4
36	"Estalla la verdad"	16 March 2021	1.11	0.3
37	"Pesquisa"	17 March 2021	1.24	0.4
38	"Marcela, la informante"	18 March 2021	1.05	0.3
39	"Mano dura"	19 March 2021	1.13	0.3
40	"En el banquillo"	22 March 2021	1.10	TBA
41	"No hay vuelta atrás"	23 March 2021	0.96	0.3
42	"Las agallas del secuestrador"	24 March 2021	1.11	0.4
43	"El peso de las pruebas"	25 March 2021	1.02	0.3
44	"Presentimiento"	26 March 2021	1.00	TBA
45	"La clave está en Vancouver"	29 March 2021	0.97	TBA
46	"Salir de la oscuridad"	30 March 2021	1.08	0.3
47	"Hundido tras las rejas"	31 March 2021	1.04	0.3
48	"El engaño"	1 April 2021	1.10	0.3
49	"Listo para matar"	2 April 2021	0.99	0.3
50	"La confesión"	5 April 2021	1.10	0.3
51	"La gran noticia"	6 April 2021	1.27	0.3
52	"Mensaje de mi padre"	7 April 2021	1.14	0.3
53	"Sin escapatoria"	8 April 2021	1.17	0.4
54	"Salvador en el ojo del huracán"	9 April 2021	1.15	0.3
55	"Sin perderle pisada"	12 April 2021	1.18	0.4
56	"Trabajo mental"	13 April 2021	1.15	0.4
57	"Culpable hasta la médula"	14 April 2021	1.15	0.4
58	"Una pérdida irreparable"	16 April 2021	1.20	0.4
59	"Salvador, único sospechoso"	19 April 2021	1.20	0.4
60	"Locuras de adolescente"	20 April 2021	1.24	0.5
61	"La cruda realidad"	21 April 2021	1.14	0.3
62	"La pesadilla apenas incia"	22 April 2021	1.07	0.3
63	"La defensa afila la puntería"	23 April 2021	1.12	0.3
64	"El pasado lo condena"	26 April 2021	1.17	0.3
65	"Extraña conexión"	27 April 2021	1.13	0.3
66	"El castigo a un violador"	28 April 2021	0.95	0.3
67	"La hija del imputado"	29 April 2021	1.11	0.3
68	"Arranca el juicio"	30 April 2021	1.08	0.3
69	"Cabrera al estrado"	3 May 2021	1.25	0.4
70	"Salvador espera la sentencia"	4 May 2021	1.08	0.3
71	"Fuga por la paz"	5 May 2021	1.11	0.3
72	"¿Quién fue?"	6 May 2021	1.25	0.4
73	"Rafaela, sin opciones"	7 May 2021	1.01	0.3
74	"Por la verdad y la justicia"	10 May 2021	1.18	0.4
75	"Creer o reventar"	11 May 2021	1.16	0.4
76	"Silencio a cualquier precio"	12 May 2021	1.37	0.4
77	"Descifrar el hallazgo"	13 May 2021	1.21	0.4
78	"Es el gran día"	14 May 2021	1.21	0.4
79	"Auxilio"	17 May 2021	1.11	0.3
80	"Todo está perdido"	18 May 2021	1.19	0.4
81	"La última cena"	19 May 2021	1.16	0.3
82	"El monstruo confesó"	20 May 2021	1.40	TBA
83	"Fugitiva"	21 May 2021	1.30	TBA
84	"Fuego cruzado"	24 May 2021	1.48	0.5

== Production ==
Buscando a Frida began filming during the COVID-19 pandemic on 26 August 2020, concluding after several months on 23 December 2020. Executive producer Marcos Santana said that the point of the series was to incorporate "social media" into an eleven-year-old story.

== Reception ==
=== Ratings ===
Viewership and ratings per season of Buscando a Frida
Season	Timeslot (ET)	Episodes	First aired		Last aired		Avg. viewers (millions)
Season	Timeslot (ET)	Episodes	Date	Viewers (millions)	Date	Viewers (millions)	Avg. viewers (millions)
1	Mon–Fri 10:00 p.m.	84	26 January 2021	1.20	24 May 2021	1.48	1.09

=== Awards and nominations ===
Year	Award	Category	Nominated	Result	Ref
2021	Produ Awards	Best Telenovela	Buscando a Frida	Nominated	
2021	Produ Awards	Best Music Theme	"Balcón"	Nominated	
2021	Produ Awards	Best Screenplay - Superseries or Telenovela	Pablo Illanes and Sandra Velasco	Won	
2022	International Emmy Award	Best Non-English Language U.S. Primetime Program	Buscando a Frida	Won	
