= El desafío =

- Genre: Telenovela; Romance; Drama
- Created by: Salvador Garmendia
- Written by: Martín Hahn
- Directed by: Renato Gutiérrez
- Starring: Mimi Lazo; Claudia Venturini; Henry Soto; Roberto Moll
- Theme music composer: Agrupación La Tamborera
- Opening theme: El desafío
- Ending theme: El desafío
- Country of origin: Venezuela
- Original language: Spanish
- No. of episodes: 113

Production
- Executive producer: Carlos Lamus Alcalá
- Producer: Hernando Faría

Original release
- Network: RCTV
- Release: May 29 – November 9, 1995

Related
- La doña (1972); Doménica Montero (1978); Amanda Sabater (1989); La Dueña (1995 Mexican TV series); Amor e odio (2001); Soy tu dueña (2010)

El desafío is a Venezuelan telenovela created by Salvador Garmendia and Martín Hahn for RCTV as a free version of the Mexican telenovela Doménica Montero from Cuban Mexican writer Inés Rodena. This telenovela lasted 113 episodes and was distributed internationally by RCTV International.

Claudia Venturini and Henry Soto star as the main protagonists with Mimi Lazo, Roberto Moll and Lucy Mendoza as the main antagonists.

== Synopsis ==
In a grand hacienda, near a coastal region surrounded by spectacular beaches, springs a story of love that is as willful and strong as its heroes... a story that begins with a challenge between two indomitable lovers and concludes with a love that defies the limits of greed, envy, and treachery. Fernanda San Vicente is a sweet and beautiful young woman who suffers a complete transformation in her personality upon discovering her lover's betrayal and her father's murder on the night of her wedding. As a result, Fernanda flees to the hacienda she inherited from her father; now impenetrable and filled with an immense resentment toward all men, she vows to rule over the hacienda and the town itself. She is accompanied by her ambitious cousin Federico (who had engineered several illegal business dealings using her family's resources and her envious cousin Marilinda, who had been having an affair with Fernanda's fiancée Mariano. Having arrived, they meet Aquiles Hurtado, the barbaric oversees of the hacienda in order to get what he wants. Still, Fernanda rules the area with an iron hand... until the moment she meets Arturo Gallardo, the only man capable of batling Fernanda for a stretch of land on the beach. Ultimately, Arturo and Fernanda fall victim to their own feelings, and the competition between them turns into a true story of love. But the love between Arturo and Fernanda represents a terrible threat to those who would take possession of Fernanda's land. Driven by greed, Marilinda, Federico, and Aquiles enlist the aid of Fernanda's mother Cristina, a woman who had abandoned her daughter years before and who had returned to the area after spending all of her money. Sergio, Cristina's young and ambitious lover, is included in their plans to destroy Arturo and Fernanda at all costs. But in the end, it is destiny that decides their fate and love that proves Defiant.

== Cast ==
- Claudia Venturini as Fernanda San Vicente
- Henry Soto as Arturo Gallardo
- Carlos Arreaza as Federico García San Vicente
- Catherine Correia as Teresita
- Mimi Lazo as Ana Luisa
- Esperanza Magaz as Severa
- Lucy Mendoza as Marilinda García San Vicente
- Roberto Moll as Aquiles Hurtado
- Amilcar Rivero as Juan Ponchao
- Rafael Romero as Sergio Duarte
- Elisa Stella as Cecilia
