= Soy tu dueña =

Mexican telenovela

- Genre: Telenovela
- Created by: Kary Fajer
- Based on: La dueña by María del Carmen Peña
- Developed by: Gerardo Luna; Alejandro Orive
- Written by: Inés Rodena
- Directed by: Salvador Garcini; Ricaro de la Parra
- Starring: Lucero; Fernando Colunga; Gabriela Spanic; Sergio Goyri; Jacqueline Andere; Ana Martín; Eduardo Capetillo
- Theme music composer: Joan Sebastian
- Opening theme: "Golondrinas viajeras" performed by Lucero and Joan Sebastian
- Ending theme: "Dueña de tu amor" performed by Lucero
- Country of origin: Mexico
- Original language: Spanish
- No. of episodes: 146

Production
- Executive producer: Nicandro Díaz González
- Producer: Antonio Arvizu
- Cinematography: Alejandro Frutos Maza; Gabriel Vázquez Bulman
- Editors: Susana Valencia; Mauricio Coronel
- Running time: 41-44 minutes (Episodes 1-135); 21-22 minutes (Episodes 136-145)
- Production company: Televisa

Original release
- Network: Canal de las Estrellas
- Release: 19 April – 7 November 2010

Related
- La doña (1972); Doménica Montero (1978); Amanda Sabater (1989); El desafío (1995); La dueña (1995); Amor e odio (2001); Doménica Montero (2025)

Soy tu dueña (Literal English translation: I'm your owner, International English title: A Woman of Steel) is a Mexican telenovela produced by Nicandro Díaz González for Televisa. It is a remake of the telenovela La Dueña, produced in 1995.

Lucero, Fernando Colunga, Gabriela Spanic, Sergio Goyri, Jacqueline Andere, Ana Martín and Eduardo Capetillo star in this telenovela.

This was Colunga's second collaboration on-screen with Spanic, since 1998's La usurpadora, and his third collaboration with Lucero, after 2005's Alborada and 2009's Mañana es para siempre.

Univision introduced Soy tu dueña in the United States because Corazón salvaje, broadcast weeknights at 9pm/8c, was the least watched telenovela during prime time. It was broadcast from 1 June to 27 December 2010, becoming the most watched telenovela during the 21:00 time slot. The last episode was broadcast on 27 December 2010 with Triunfo del amor replacing it on 3 January 2011.

== Plot ==
Valentina Villalba is a successful businesswoman and the heiress of a great fortune that her parents left to her upon their untimely death during her childhood. She lives in her Mexico City mansion with her aunt, Isabel, her cousin, Ivana, and her nanny, Benita. Ivana is consumed with envy and jealousy toward Valentina and believes she deserves everything her cousin possesses. Valentina is in love with and engaged to marry Alonso Peñalvert. Unbeknownst to Valentina, Ivana and Alonso are having an affair and are conspiring to steal her fortune.

Everything changes for Valentina when Alonso leaves her at the altar. From a sweet and sensible young woman, she transforms into a cold, authoritarian, and bitter person. She isolates herself and goes to live at the 'Los Cascabeles' ranch, one of her properties in the countryside. At "Los Cascabeles" and the town, she becomes known to all as "La Víbora" (Spanish for viper or snake), due to her cold-hearted personality.

In the countryside, she meets José Miguel, an attractive, intelligent, and sensitive young man who has recently moved to the neighboring ranch. Between Valentina and José Miguel, several disagreements arise over the boundaries of their lands. She responds haughtily, but José Miguel, nevertheless, falls in love with Valentina's beauty and strong character and becomes determined to win her over.

Valentina's family decides to join her at "Los Cascabeles". Thus, begins a story of lies, deceptions, duplicity and treachery in which José Miguel must fight for Valentina's love against not only Ivana, who has become infatuated with him, but also against the wishes of his own mother and Valentina's ruthless ranch foreman, Rosendo Gavilán, who has fallen in love with Valentina.

== Cast ==
=== Main ===
- Lucero as Valentina Villalba
- Fernando Colunga as José Miguel Montesinos
- Gabriela Spanic as Ivana Dorantes
- Sergio Goyri as Rosendo Gavilán
- Jacqueline Andere as Leonor
- Ana Martín as Maria
- Eduardo Capetillo as Horacio

==== Also main ====
- David Zepeda as Alonso Peñalvert
- Julio Alemán as Ernesto Galeana
- Carlos Bracho as Father Justino
- Eric del Castillo as Federico Montesinos
- José Carlos Ruiz as Sabino
- Marisol del Olmo as Gabriela
- Fabián Robles as Felipe
- Ana Bertha Espín as Enriqueta
- David Ostrosky as Moisés Macotela
- Rossana San Juan as Crisanta
- Fátima Torre as Iluminada
- Cristina Obregón as Sandra Macotela
- Paul Stanley as Timoteo
- Mario del Río as Filadelfo
- Claudia Ortega as Teresa
- Eduardo Rivera as Juan
- Diego Ávila as Chuy

==== Recurring and guest stars ====
- Gerardo Albarrán as Nerón Almoguera
- Claudio Báez as Óscar Ampudia
- Tony Bravo as Evelio Zamarripa / Úrsulo Barragán
- Arsenio Campos as Father Justino #2
- Guillermo Capetillo as Rogelio Villalba
- Aurora Clavel as Angustias
- Emoé de la Parra as Narda
- Anabel Ferreira as Amparo
- Vicente Herrera as Dante Espíndola
- Martha Julia as Bridesmaid
- Pilar Montenegro as Arcelia Olivares
- Diana Osorio as Margarita
- Raúl Padilla "Chóforo" as Father Ventura
- Alejandra Procuna as Brenda
- Eduardo Rodríguez as Dr. Esteban Noguera
- Alejandro Ruiz as Nazario Melgarejo
- Myrrah Saavedra as Leonela
- Marisol Santacruz as Cecilia Rangel
- Juan Carlos Serrán as Syndic
- Tony Vela as Commander Toledo
- Silvia Pinal as Isabel Rangel

== Awards and nominations ==
Year	Association	Category	Nominee(s)	Result
2010	People en Español Awards	Best Telenovela	Soy tu dueña	Nominated
2010	People en Español Awards	Best Actress	Lucero	Nominated
2010	People en Español Awards	Best Actor	Fernando Colunga	Won
2010	People en Español Awards	Best Female or Male Villain	Gabriela Spanic	Nominated
2010	People en Español Awards	Best Female or Male Villain	Sergio Goyri	Nominated
2010	People en Español Awards	Best Couple	Lucero; Fernando Colunga	Nominated
2010	People en Español Awards	Best Remake	Soy tu dueña	Nominated
2010	Califa de Oro Awards	Outstanding Performance	Eric del Castillo	Won
2010	TV Adicto Golden Awards	Best Male Villain	Sergio Goyri	Won
2010	TV Adicto Golden Awards	Best Male Lead	Fernando Colunga	Won
2010	TV Adicto Golden Awards	Best Female Lead	Lucero	Won
2010	TV Adicto Golden Awards	Best Couple	Lucero; Fernando Colunga	Won
2010	Golden Awards Of The Decade	Best Hunk	Fernando Colunga	Won
2011	TVyNovelas Awards	Best Telenovela	Nicandro Díaz González	Nominated
2011	TVyNovelas Awards	Best Actress	Lucero	Nominated
2011	TVyNovelas Awards	Best Actor	Fernando Colunga	Won
2011	TVyNovelas Awards	Best Antagonist Actress	Jacqueline Andere	Nominated
2011	TVyNovelas Awards	Best Antagonist Actor	Sergio Goyri	Nominated
2011	TVyNovelas Awards	Best Leading Actress	Ana Martín	Nominated
2011	TVyNovelas Awards	Best Leading Actress	Silvia Pinal	Nominated
2011	TVyNovelas Awards	Best Leading Actor	Eric del Castillo	Nominated
2011	TVyNovelas Awards	Best Co-lead Actor	David Zepeda	Nominated
2011	TVyNovelas Awards	Best Female Revelation	Fátima Torre	Won
2011	TVyNovelas Awards	Best Male Revelation	Paul Stanley	Won
2011	Bravo Awards	Best Leading Actress	Silvia Pinal	Won
2011	Bravo Awards	Best Leading Actor	Julio Alemán	Won
2011	Bravo Awards	Best Female Revelation	Fátima Torre	Won
2011	Latin ACE Awards	Best Soap	Soy tu dueña	Won
2011	Latin ACE Awards	Best Actress	Lucero	Won
2011	Latin ACE Awards	Best Direction	Salvador Garcini; Ricardo de la Parra	Won
2011	ASCAP Film and Television Music Awards	Best Telenovela Song	"Dueña de tu amor" by Lucero	Won
2020	TV Adicto Golden Awards	Best Rerun	Soy tu dueña	Won
