= Famasloop =

- Origin: Caracas, Venezuela
- Genres: Electronic
- Years active: 2002–present
- Labels: Tara Records
- Members: Alain Gómez, Luis Daniel González, Ricardo Martínez, Rafael Urbina and Vanesa Gouveia.
- Website: http://www.famasloop.com

Famasloop is a Latin Grammy-nominated electronic music band from Caracas, Venezuela. The band's members are Alain Gómez, Luis Daniel González, Ricardo Martínez, Rafael Urbina and Vanesa Gouveia. The group's first album, Tres Casas, which was released in June 2006, experimented with electronic music to integrate several genres such as pop, Latin, rock, hip-hop, trip hop, Afro-Venezuelan, classical, Hindu, tango and jazz.

Tres Casas, which literally means Three Houses in Spanish, was released with a surrounding concept represented in the album's art and multimedia content, designed by the Venezuelan artist collective Keloide. Famasloop has described to the press that the album is divided into three houses, each one with a different theme (commercial, intellectual and spiritual). All of these houses include a half-a-minute introductory Puerta (Spanish for door), and three songs, making a total of twelve tracks. The album received production and post-production guest contribution from well-known musicians, such as Tweety González (keyboardist of Fito Páez), Nené Vázquez (percussionist of Aterciopelados), Guille Vadalá (Bass guitarist of Fito Páez), Oswaldo Rodríguez (Sur Carabaela) and more.

In 2021, their song "Balcón" (featuring Luis Jiménez) was featured as the main theme song of Telemundo's telenovela, Buscando a Frida.

== Discography ==
=== Albums ===
Tres Casas (2006)

1. Puerta 1
2. Estrella en Loop
3. Mundo
4. Eres
5. Puerta 2
6. Pararrayos
7. Lu Arbole
8. Cementerio
9. Puerta 3
10. Avión A
11. Mar
12. Iguana

Casa 4 (2009)

1. Iguana
2. Chinita
3. NQV
4. Te Juro
5. Chamo Pol La Casa
6. Al Revés
7. Cada
8. Cucaracha
9. De Fuego en Fuego
10. Vaca Lechera

La Quema (2012)

1. Luciérnaga
2. The Choro Dance
3. Por Estas Calles
4. Imaginar
5. Canuto y Canito
6. Más Cerquita
7. La Vaca Indefinida
8. Tonada del Niño Con Barba
9. Taima
10. Uno y El Universo

Lo Más Seguro Es Que Quién Sabe (2022)

1. Nadie
2. Canibal
3. Dengue
4. Resistencia
5. Ombligo
6. Goxcila (feat. DJ Yirvin)
7. Balcón (feat. Luis Jiménez)
8. Por Ti
9. Gira

=== Singles and EP ===
- Cómo Fue (feat, Betsayda Machado) (2020)
- No Pasa Nada (2015)
- Allí Estás (2014)
- Terrenal (2014)
