= Unstoppable (TV series) =

Mexican television series

- Genre: Teen drama
- Starring: Tessa Ía; Bárbara López; Lucía Uribe; Coty Camacho
- Country of origin: Mexico
- Original language: Spanish
- No. of seasons: 1
- No. of episodes: 10

Production
- Executive producers: Diego Martínez Ulanosky; Mariana "Rana" González; Octavio Gortázar; Estefanía Leal
- Producers: Raúl Aragón; Lea Le Ngoc
- Cinematography: Julio Llorente
- Running time: 34-43 minutes
- Production company: Caponeto

Original release
- Network: Netflix
- Release: 28 February 2020

Unstoppable (Spanish: Desenfrenadas) is a Mexican comedy drama television series that premiered on Netflix on 28 February 2020. It stars Tessa Ía, Bárbara López, Lucía Uribe, and Coty Camacho.

The series was created and produced by Diego Martínez Ulanosky. Ulanosky also directed seven of the episodes with the other three directed by Julio Hernández Cordón and Elisa Miller.

== Plot ==
The series revolves around three wealthy friends, Rocío, Vera, and Carlota, who decide to take a road trip to Oaxaca and on the way meet a stranger who changes their lives.

== Cast ==
- Tessa Ía as Vera, a carefree fashion blogger
- Bárbara López as Rocío, a doctor
- Lucía Uribe as Carlota, a Jewish feminist blogger
- Coty Camacho as Marcela, a petty criminal on the run from her boss and ex-boyfriend
- Fernando Ciangherotti as Ignacio, Rocío's doctor father
- Tomás Ruiz as Juanpi, Rocío's fiancé
- Camila Valero as Sofía, Rocío's deceased sister and former ballerina
- Diego Calva as Joshua, Marcela's ex-boyfriend
- Gabriel Chávez as Sapo, a drug dealer on the lookout for Marcela

== Episodes ==
No.	Title	Directed by	Written by	Original release date
1	"I Want to Get the F*** Away"	Diego Martínez Ulanosky	Diego Martínez Ulanosky	28 February 2020
Rocío, a promising medical student who is engaged to her long term boyfriend and who is about to leave for a prestigious fellowship in Sweden, starts falling apart after her beloved sister's recent death. After a celebration following her academic success she and her two best friends, Vera and Carlota, decide to blow off some steam in Oaxaca. Meanwhile Marcela, a young woman who works for a gang of petty criminals, is pimped out to them by her boyfriend who intends to have her work to pay off his debts. After stealing money and a gun from her boss she goes on the run heading to Oaxaca.
2	"Check Your Privilege"	Diego Martínez Ulanosky	Diego Martínez Ulanosky	28 February 2020
At a gas station pit stop Marcela asks Vera and the girls for a ride to Oaxaca. Though Rocío wants to give her a lift, Vera refuses. Marcela then pulls a gun on them. After some quick thinking from Vera they manage to escape Marcela when they convince her to get out of the car to check a flat. In Oaxaca the girls get dressed up to go to a club. Vera meets a date, Gonzalo, and makes out with him to make her DJ boyfriend, Cris, jealous but later ditches Gonzalo to have sex with Cris in the bathroom. Carlota makes a surprising connection with a stranger who invites her to an art gallery when she uses the men's bathroom. At the end of the night Marcela rejoins them in the car and holds them up again.
3	"What Clashes With You Keeps You In Check"	Diego Martínez Ulanosky & Elisa Miller	Diego Martínez Ulanosky	28 February 2020
Rocío vows to help Marcela reunite with her brother, a process which is impeded when Marcela runs away after realizing gang members are after her. Carlota and the girls go to the feminist art gallery she was invited to where she learns the boy she met is actually dating one of the artists. Vera runs into Gonzalo at a bar and after drinking heavily he tries to rape her. The attempted rape is stopped by Marcela, who threatens him with a gun before helping Vera escape.
4	"High School Pact"	Diego Martínez Ulanosky	Diego Martínez Ulanosky	February 28, 2020
When the police arrive at the girls' hotel looking for answer they make a break for it only to realize that the police were actually there looking for Rocío as her family is worried about her. Meanwhile, Rocío is haunted by memories of her sister, a ballet dancer who died of a heart attack after taking too many pills. The girls drop Marcela off to meet a friend, however after getting a threatening call they pick her up again and decide to head to Vera's father's luxurious estate in Huatulco until they can figure out their next move.
5	"First World Problems"	Diego Martínez Ulanosky	Diego Martínez Ulanosky	February 28, 2020
Vera tries to unwind at her father's house but is bothered by her stepmother's presence and memories of a New Year's Eve party where she was molested by her father's business partner. After witnessing the girls' bickering with each other over nothing Marcela opens up about her own life, revealing how she was manipulated into stripping and prostitution to protect her young brother. After Vera fights with her stepmother the girls leave the house and forced to seek refuge elsewhere in the middle of a coming storm.
6	"Stormy Ladies"	Elisa Miller	Diego Martínez Ulanosky	February 28, 2020
The girls become lost on a backroad and are rescued from the storm by a rancher. They meet his wife Juana, a local midwife. During the storm Juana's services are needed during a birth and Rocío is called on to assist, learning more about practical medicine instead of going by what she's learned through books. Left together during the storm, Marcela learns more of Vera's secrets and the two grow even closer.
7	"The Sunsets I Gifted My Sisters"	Julio Hernández Cordón	Diego Martínez Ulanosky	February 28, 2020
After running out of gas the girls find themselves trapped in Puerto Escondido with no money as Vera's father has cut off her credit cards. To curb their hunger the girls take magic mushrooms gifted to Rocío from Juana's son Vincente. They head to the beach where they are found by Rocío's fiancé, Juanpi, who has tracked Rocío down and is desperate to bring her back home.
8	"Hangover Is the Best Shortcut to Failure"	Julio Hernández Cordón	Diego Martínez Ulanosky	February 28, 2020
Marcela flees once more and Rocío and Carlota don't understand why Vera seems to feel especially betrayed by her disappearance. In the meantime the girls split up, with Rocío spending the day flirting with a surfer dude while Vera tries to make amends with her fashion friends only to learn that she's the toxic one in their workplace.
9	"Accept My Existence or Expect Resistance"	Diego Martínez Ulanosky	Diego Martínez Ulanosky	February 28, 2020
A heartbroken Carlota deals with the fallout from having her intimate photographs to her online boyfriend, Toshi, leaked and gone viral but receives unexpected support. After spending the day with the surfer Rocío meets up with her friends and finally confronts Juanpi about their lackluster relationship. Marcela finally meets up with her brother, Mike, but finds that he is less than pleased to see her.
10	"Balls Deep"	Diego Martínez Ulanosky	Diego Martínez Ulanosky	February 28, 2020
Marcela is forced by Joshua to work in a strip club and their relationship becomes increasingly abusive. She sends an apologetic text to Vera for walking out on her. Vera, along with the rest of the girls, tries to track Marcela down, eventually finding her at the strip club where she works. Witnessing Joshua attack Marcela, Vera shoots him in the leg with a gun. The girls manage to save Marcela and her brother Mike, taking them back to Mexico City.
