= La Dueña (1995 Mexican TV series) =

Mexican telenovela

- Genre: Telenovela; Romance; Drama
- Created by: Inés Rodena
- Written by: María del Carmen Peña
- Directed by: Roberto Gómez Fernández
- Starring: Angélica Rivera; Cynthia Klitbo; Francisco Gattorno; Eduardo Santamarina
- Theme music composer: Roberto Gómez Bolaños
- Opening theme: "Tengo todo contigo" by Alberto Ángel "El Cuervo"
- Country of origin: Mexico
- Original language: Spanish
- No. of episodes: 95

Production
- Executive producer: Florinda Meza
- Producer: Alfredo González Fernández
- Production locations: Filming; Televisa San Ángel; Mexico City, Mexico; Locations; Mexico City, Mexico; San Ignacio, Mexico
- Cinematography: José Luis Gómez A.
- Running time: 41-44 minutes
- Production company: Televisa

Original release
- Network: Canal de las Estrellas
- Release: May 22 – September 29, 1995

Related
- La doña (1972); Doménica Montero (1978); Amanda Sabater (1989); El desafío (1995); Amor e odio (2001); Soy tu dueña (2010); Doménica Montero (2025)

La Dueña (English title: Lady Owner) is a Mexican telenovela produced by Florinda Meza for Televisa in 1995.

The series stars Angélica Rivera, Cynthia Klitbo, Francisco Gattorno and Eduardo Santamarina.

== Plot ==
Regina Villarreal is a young and beautiful woman who inherits a fortune from her deceased parents. Regina lives with her aunt, Berenice, whom she loves as if she were her own mother, her unbearable and envious cousin, Laura, and her inseparable nanny, Martina. Laura feels that she deserves everything her cousin Regina has, so she decides to make her suffer by seducing her fiancé, Mauricio, who is only after her money. On her wedding day, Regina is left at the altar by Mauricio, which shatters her heart and transforms from a sweet woman into a cold and authoritarian figure.

Regina moves to one of her properties, "Los Cascabeles", a ranch far away from the capital city. She becomes a resentful and indomitable woman, "La Dueña" ("Lady Owner"), as her employees call her. Furthermore, her reputation earns her the nickname "Víbora" ("Viper") among the locals. There she meets José María, owner of the neighboring ranch "Los Encinos". Both fall for each other, but Regina does not reveal her feelings for him for fear of getting hurt again in a relationship.

Around this time, Berenice, Laura, and Martina also move to "Los Cascabeles". Macario, the foreman of the ranch, is in love with Regina and he and Laura scheme to keep Regina and José María apart. Laura has also fallen in love with José María; because of this, Regina will once again become a target for her cousin, even though this time Regina will not let anyone steal her beloved's heart from her.

== Cast ==
- Angélica Rivera as Regina Villarreal Montenegro "La Dueña"
- Cynthia Klitbo as Laura Castro Montenegro
- Norma Herrera as Berenice Montenegro Viuda de Castro
- Salvador Sánchez as Macario Robles
- Raúl Ramírez as Severiano Cortés
- Josefina Echánove as Martina
- Miguel Pizarro as Octavio Acosta
- Jorge del Campo as Anselmo Morales
- Eduardo López Rojas as Gregorio "Goyo" Mendoza
- Francisco Gattorno as José María Cortés
- Eduardo Santamarina as Mauricio Padilla
- Eugenia Avendaño as Silvia de Hernández
- Mario Casillas as Manuel Hernández
- Marco Uriel as Ismael Andrade
- Georgina Pedret as Patricia "Paty" Castelo
- Lucía Guilmáin as Consuelo López
- Yula Pozo as Armida Gómez
- Aylín Mújica as Fabiola Hernández
- Paty Díaz as Blanca "Blanquita" López
- Beto 'el Boticario' as Father Abel Güitrón
- Jesús Arriaga as Lucio
- Claudia Eliza Aguilar as Aurelia
- Luis Reynoso as Commander Jesús Reyna
- Claudia Cañedo as Sonia Fuentes
- Simone Brook as Dora Montes
- Gilberto Román as Leandro Rentería
- Mariana Karr as Julieta de Rentería
- Antonio Miguel as Father Juan Suárez
- Gerardo Gayardo as Omar
- José Antonio Ferral as Ezequiel García
- Horacio Vera as Fortunato
- Rosita Quintana as Emma de Cortés

== Awards and nominations ==
Year	Award	Category	Nominee	Result
1996	TVyNovelas Awards	Best Telenovela	Florinda Meza	Nominated
1996	TVyNovelas Awards	Best Actress	Angélica Rivera	Nominated
1996	TVyNovelas Awards	Best Antagonist Actress	Cynthia Klitbo	Nominated
1996	TVyNovelas Awards	Best Antagonist Actor	Salvador Sánchez	Won
1996	TVyNovelas Awards	Best Supporting Actor	Miguel Pizarro	Nominated
1996	TVyNovelas Awards	Best Female Revelation	Angélica Rivera	Won
1996	TVyNovelas Awards	Best Male Revelation	Francisco Gattorno	Won
1996	TVyNovelas Awards	Best Musical Theme	"Tengo todo contigo" by Alberto Ángel "El Cuervo"	Won
1996	El Heraldo de México Awards	Best Telenovela	Florinda Meza	Nominated
1996	El Heraldo de México Awards	Best Actress	Angélica Rivera	Nominated
1996	El Heraldo de México Awards	Best Actor	Eduardo Santamarina	Nominated
1996	El Heraldo de México Awards	Best Revelation	Francisco Gattorno	Won
1996	Eres Awards	Best Telenovela	Florinda Meza	Won
1996	Eres Awards	Best Actress	Angélica Rivera	Nominated
1996	Eres Awards	Best Actor	Francisco Gattorno	Won
1996	Eres Awards	Television Debut	Francisco Gattorno	Won
1996	Latin ACE Awards	Best Supporting Actress	Cynthia Klitbo	Won
1996	Latin ACE Awards	Best Supporting Actor	Salvador Sánchez	Won
1996	Latin ACE Awards	Female Revelation of the Year	Aylín Mújica	Won
1996	Latin ACE Awards	Male Revelation of the Year	Francisco Gattorno	Won
