= Amores que engañan =

- Genre: Drama
- Written by: Denisse Pfeiffer; Agnieszka Kawecka; Daniel Henrich
- Directed by: Nicolás Di Blasi
- Theme music composer: Sebastian Mellino; Ariela Lafuente; Lady Ant; Crash
- Opening theme: "Amores que engañan" (Note: Performed by Valeria Lynch in the first season and José Luis Rodríguez in the second season.)
- Country of origin: Mexico
- Original language: Spanish
- No. of seasons: 2
- No. of episodes: 22

Production
- Executive producers: Roxana Rotundo; Carmen Larios; Juana María Torres; Rosalind Rotundo; Arlette Siaretta; Solange Cruz
- Producer: Sofía Garrido
- Production companies: Casablanca; Yahayra Films; VIP 2000 TV

Original release
- Network: Lifetime Latin America
- Release: 14 May 2022 – 19 August 2023

Amores que engañan is a Mexican anthology television series produced by Casablanca, Yahayra Films and VIP 2000 TV for Lifetime Latin America. The series premiered on 14 May 2022. In December 2022, the series was renewed for a second season that premiered on 3 June 2023.

Each episode stars different actors and tell the stories of women who face everyday situations including psychological and verbal violence, betrayal and heartbreak, obsession and passion and infidelity.

== Notable guest stars ==
- Marjorie de Sousa
- Carlos Ponce
- Christian Vázquez
- Grettell Valdez
- Francisco Gattorno
- Héctor Suárez Gomís
- Aylín Mújica
- Lupita Ferrer
- Ivonne Montero
- Pepe Gámez
- Erika de la Rosa
- Gabriel Porras
- Juan Pablo Llano
- Mark Tacher
- Sofía Sylwin
- Leonardo Daniel
- Verónica Montes
- Ignacio Casano
- Gabriela Vergara
- Ana Patricia Rojo
- Omar Fierro
- Víctor Cámara
- Jorge Salinas
- Scarlet Ortiz
- Sophia Abrahão
- Duda Nagle
- Julia Gama
- Danna García
- Cristián de la Fuente
- Helena Rojo
- Gabriela Spanic
- Sergio Basáñez
- Laura Flores
- Manuel Landeta
- Yul Bürkle
- Sebastián Caicedo
- Alicia Machado
- Anette Michel
- Ariadne Díaz
- Luciano D'Alessandro
- Alejandra Espinoza
- Juan Soler
- Marlene Favela
- Pedro Moreno
- Ishbel Bautista

== Episodes ==
=== Series overview ===
Series	Episodes	Originally released	
Series	Episodes	First released	Last released
1	10	14 May 2022	6 August 2022
2	12	3 June 2023	19 August 2023

=== Season 1 (2022) ===
No. overall	No. in season	Title	Original release date
1	1	"Vientre en alquiler"	14 May 2022
Jorge and Elisa want to have a child, but Elisa's attempts of getting pregnant are in vain. Bélgica, Elisa's cousin, agrees to help them by being their surrogate mother. Bélgica's true intentions are to keep the baby and take Elisa's place. Cast: Marjorie de Sousa as Elisa, Carlos Ponce as Jorge, Nicole Mayer as Bélgica, Ana Monterrubio as Mariel, Alberto Rodríguez as Alberto Rodríguez
2	2	"Solo una oportunidad"	21 May 2022
Sofi and Frank are co-workers that have developed a good friendship. One day Frank confesses to Sofi that he is in love with her. Sofi decides to give him a chance but soon she discovers the monster that Frank is. Cast: Christian Vázquez as Frank, Grettell Valdez as Sofi, Francisco Gattorno as Marcel, Gala Ganchola as Inés, Humberto Fuentes as Jorge, Heriberto Villacaña as Client, Erick Blackmer as Jefe, Mer Dupont as Rocío, Gabriela Barajas as Eloísa
3	3	"Derecho a ser feliz"	28 May 2022
Diana has lived a 25-year marriage with a man who cheats on her, physically and psychologically mistreats her and minimizes her all the time. Her children have grown up imitating their father's behavior. Diana decides to face her reality to have a better life. Cast: Héctor Suárez Gomís as Mario, Aylín Mújica as Diana, Lupita Ferrer as Mamá Diana, Ana Cepinska as Amparo, Mau Arechiga as José, Esmeralda Cervantes as Rosaura, Gabriela Miramontes as Tomás, Humberto Estrella as Cousin Mario
4	4	"Lo virtual no es real"	4 June 2022
Angie is a single 32-year old successful woman who meets through a website a widowed doctor with whom she falls in love. She does not suspect that she is the victim of a dangerous network of men who are dedicated to catfishing. Cast: Ivonne Montero as Angie, Pepe Gámez as Max, Nayely Salazar as María, Michelle Santané as Rebeca, Pony Camacho as Mrs. Ibarra, Julio César Álvarez as Pepe, Miguel Ángel Betancourt as Nicolás, Edgar Alpizar as Paramedic, Miranda Cárdenas as Lucía
5	5	"Mía solo mía"	11 June 2022
Laura suffers an accident that has caused her to lose control of her legs and her memory. She remains isolated in bed, recovering under Roberto's care. Laura begins to suspect that Roberto's intentions are not good and that he is not the person he claims to be. Cast: Erika de la Rosa as Laura, Gabriel Porras as Roberto, Juan Pablo Llano as Antonie, Alexa Anaya as Vivian, Angélica Ramírez as Wendy, Patricia Calzada as Ofelia
6	6	"Sobreviviente"	18 June 2022
Dulce lives with a mother who mistreats and punishes her. When she meets Ernesto, she decides to elope with him, although she is a minor. Unknowingly, Dulce becomes the victim of a human trafficking gang. Cast: Mark Tacher as Ernesto, Sofía Sylwin as Dulce, Leonardo Daniel as Pepe, Héctor Palma as Dulce's father, Citlali Navarro as Dulce's mother, Martha Flores as Rebeca, Grecia Rodríguez as Mireya, Edwin Ruiz as Dr. Suárez, Mario Iván Cervantes as Germán, Karlek Ramos as Lorena
7	7	"Nuestro pacto"	25 June 2022
Andrea and Sergio have been dating for two years and Sergio wants them to move in together, but Andrea prefers to finish her specialty in psychiatry, which forces her to move to another city. They promise to wait for each other, but Sergio will do anything to get Andrea to come back to him. Cast: Verónica Montes as Andrea, Ignacio Casano as Sergio, Gabriela Vergara as Dr. Magdalena Díaz, Marco Orozco as Dr. Herrán, Karina Tawney as Martha, Raúl Santana as Gilberto, Marimar Espinoza as Nancy, Ericka Cisneros as Young Andrea, Erick de la Torre as Young Sergio
8	8	"Compañeros hasta la muerte"	2 July 2022
Edna and Francisco, two recent widowers, attend a therapy group to overcome their loss. They develop a friendship, however, Francisco has become obsessed with the fear of loneliness and determined not to spend the rest of his life alone, he locks Edna up against her will. Cast: Ana Patricia Rojo as Edna, Omar Fierro as Francisco, Víctor Cámara, Ana Karen Coy as Amelia, Edgar Ruvalcaba as Miguel, Guillermo Esquivias as Octavio
9	9	"Ayuda del más allá"	9 July 2022
Ana Paula marries Victor Manuel, a widowed businessman and moves into his mansion with her daughter, Lori. Lori perceives a strange presence in the house that warns her that both are in danger. Cast: Jorge Salinas as Victor Manuel, Scarlet Ortiz as Ana Paula, Jud Barbosa as Verónica, Amelia Guillén as Lori, Vera Wilson as Jimena, Sara Isabel Quintero as Rosalba
10	10	"La felicidad no tiene precio"	6 August 2022
Amanda is about to get married when she discovers that her fiancé is cheating on her. Heartbroken, she opens herself to the possibility of an affair with Patrick, a handsome millionaire. Cast: Sophia Abrahão as Amanda, Duda Nagle as Patrick, Julia Gama as Valeria, Wania Rangel as Lara, Gutemberg Brito as César, Lucelina Nunes as Raquel

=== Season 2 (2023) ===
No. overall	No. in season	Title	Original release date
11	1	"Durmiendo con un extraño"	3 June 2023
After three months of dating, Ingrid marries Ricardo, whom she considers the perfect man. Ingrid's life takes a turn when Ricardo begins to show symptoms of a severe bipolar disorder that he was managing to hide. Cast: Danna García as Ingrid, Carlos Ponce as Ricardo
12	2	"La familia perfecta"	10 June 2023
After marrying Ricardo, Mariana stopped working and became economically dependent on him. Mariana confronts her husband when their situation puts her children at risk. Cast: Marjorie de Sousa as Mariana, Cristián de la Fuente as Ricardo, Perla Encinas as Katy, Maite Urrutia as Vanessa, Miguel Ángel Betancourt as Alfonso, Guillermo Esquivas as Álan, Jorge Cuellar as Carlos, Regina Aguilar as Lucy
13	3	"El preferido de mamá"	17 June 2023
Lorena believes that Reynaldo is the perfect son. Little by little, Reynaldo's family will begin to see his true nature, a liar and manipulator whose wife has left him. Cast: Helena Rojo as Lorena, Mark Tacher as Reynaldo, Julia Gama as Ingrid, Anna Cepinska as Eva, Gala Canchola as Amanda, Rogeiro Martín del Campo as Cristóbal
14	4	"Talento robado"	24 June 2023
As a housewife, Elisa is dedicated to her family and to supporting her husband Diego's writing career. However, after years of living under Diego's shadow and mistreatment, Elisa decides to reveal a long-hidden secret. Cast: Gabriela Spanic as Elisa, Sergio Basáñez as Diego, Denisse, Corona as Dalila, Enríque Rama as León, Thiago Coutinho as Martín, Sara Quintero as Guadalupe, Erick Guillén Torres as child León
15	5	"Secretos de familia"	1 July 2023
Adela is pregnant, but after undergoing DNA tests she realizes that her DNA does not match her parents and finds out that she was switched at birth. Cast: Laura Flores as Norma, Ferny Graciano as Adela, Manuel Landeta as Osvaldo, Darío Rocas as Roberto, Yosi Lugo as Elvira, Jesús Hernández as Dr. González, Tere María as Luz Elena, Miroslava Ocampo as young Norma, Carlos Méndez as young Carlos
16	6	"Huyendo del pasado"	8 July 2023
After having had a violent boyfriend, Abigail moves to a new city to rebuild her life. As she settles into her new life, she meets another person whom she falls in love with. However, Abigail's ex-boyfriend has been following her and will do everything to get her back. Cast: Scarlet Ortiz as Abigail, Yul Bürkle
17	7	"¿Dónde están mis hijos?"	15 July 2023
After divorcing Tomás, a conflictive and powerful man, Nora starts a new life with her two young children and new partner. Tomás takes advantage of the shared custody to take the children abroad and separate them from her. Cast: Erika de la Rosa as Nora, Sebastián Caicedo as Tomás, Amelia Guillén as Natalia, Emiliano de la Vega as Isaac, Alejandro Ávila as Alejandro, Azucena Evans as Gisela, Angelica Ramírez as Reina, Mario Iván Cervantes as Antonio, Guillermo Alejandro as Torres
18	8	"Amor compartido"	22 July 2023
Sabrina believes that her husband Rafael is the perfect man, however, after a heart attack he suffers abroad, Sabrina soon learns that Rafael has a mistress, with whom he has a son. Cast: Alicia Machado as Sabrina, Anette Michel as Leticia, Francisco Gattorno as Rafael, Laura Gudiño as Virginia, Saúl Alfaro as Ralph, Angelique Leñero as Mónica, Matías Gallardo as Rafa, Emma Lucía Ruíz as Oriana
19	9	"Inalcanzable"	29 July 2023
After meeting at a party, Alejandra starts dating Rogelio, a handsome and seductive guy who minimizes and manipulates her in order to lure her into a trap. Cast: Ariadne Díaz as Alejandra, Luciano D'Alessandro as Rogelio, Giovan Ramos as Manuel, Michelle Santané as Maya, Katya Paredes as Brenda, Emilio Rosas Aceves as Lucas, Gus del Toro as Ernesto
10	20	"Pacto de silencio"	5 August 2023
After the death of her husband, Solimar returns to her hometown to resume her career as a journalist. She is invited by a friend to a motivational group where she meets René, the groups leader, with whom she falls in love. Solimar discovers that the group is actually a cult and that René takes advantage of its members. Cast: Alejandra Espinoza as Solimar, Juan Soler as René, Laura de las Rivas as Karen, Venus Celeste as Esther, Martha Flores as Aida, Karely Regev as Reina, Jony Perdomo as Juan Pablo
11	21	"Sin miedo"	12 August 2023
Fabiola falls in love with Charly and when they move in together, Fabiola's anxiety disorders intensify. Cast: Marlene Favela as Fabiola, Pedro Moreno as Charly, Luciano Seri as Álvaro, Patricia Calzada as Linda, Marco Orozco as Román, Karlek Ramos as Detective López
12	22	"Juego peligroso"	19 August 2023
Cast: Ishbel Bautista as Corina, Héctor Suárez Gomís as Atilio

== Production ==
Filming of Amores que engañan began in January 2022. Filming took place in the United States, Mexico, and São Paulo, Brazil. A total of ten episodes have been confirmed for the first season. On 16 December 2022, the series was renewed for a second season. Filming of the second season began on 16 January 2023 in Guadalajara, México. On 24 January 2022, a list of guest stars for the second season was announced and that the season had received an order of 12 episodes. The second season premiered on 3 June 2023.

== Reception ==
=== Awards and nominations ===
Year	Award	Category	Nominated	Result	Ref
2022	Produ Awards	Best Anthology Series	Amores que engañan	Nominated	
2022	Produ Awards	Best Music Theme - Superseries or Telenovela	"Amores que engañan" by Valeria Lynch	Nominated	
2022	Produ Awards	Best Lead Actor - Drama Series	Jorge Salinas	Nominated	
2023	Produ Awards	Best Anthology Series	Amores que engañan	Nominated	
2023	Produ Awards	Best Music Composer	Sebastián Mellino	Nominated	
