= Señorita 89 =

Mexican TV series

- Genre: Drama
- Created by: Lucía Puenzo
- Written by: Lucía Puenzo; María Renée Prudencio; Tatiana Mereñuk
- Directed by: Lucía Puenzo; Nicolás Puenzo; Sílvia Quer; Jimena Montemayor
- Starring: Ilse Salas; Ximena Romo; Bárbara López; Natasha Dupeyron; Leidi Gutiérrez; Coty Camacho
- Composers: Andres Goldstein; Daniel Tarrab
- Country of origin: Mexico
- Original language: Spanish
- No. of seasons: 2
- No. of episodes: 16

Production
- Executive producers: Ángela Poblete; Mariane Hartard; Christian Vesper; Marta Nuñez Puerto
- Producers: Juan de Dios Larraín; Pablo Larraín
- Editors: Misael Bustos; Esteban Puenzo; Hugo Primero
- Production companies: Fábula; Fremantle

Original release
- Network: Pantaya; Starzplay
- Release: 27 February 2022 – 13 March 2024

Señorita 89 is a Mexican television series created by Lucía Puenzo. It premiered on 27 February 2022 on Pantaya in the United States and Starzplay in Latin America. In October 2022, the series was renewed for a second season that premiered on 13 March 2024 on Universal+.

== Cast ==
=== Main ===
- Ilse Salas as Concepción
- Ximena Romo as Elena
- Bárbara López as Dolores (Miss Guerrero)
- Natasha Dupeyron as Isabel (Miss Yucatán)
- Leidi Gutiérrez as Jocelyn (Miss Chihuahua)
- Coty Camacho as Ángeles (Miss Oaxaca)

=== Recurring ===
- Edwarda Gurrola as Luisa
- Marcelo Alonso
- Juan Manuel Bernal
- Luis Ernesto Franco
- Ianis Guerrero as Antonio
- Ari Brickman as Valenzuela Helú
- Mónica del Carmen as Licha
- Mabel Cadena as Nora
- Aida López as Dr. Franco
- Getsemani Vela as Marijó (Miss Guanajuato)

== Episodes ==
=== Series overview ===
Series	Episodes	Originally released	
Series	Episodes	First released	Last released
1	8	27 February 2022	10 April 2022
2	8	13 March 2024	

=== Season 1 (2022) ===
No. overall	No. in season	Title	Directed by	Original release date
1	1	"Elena"	Lucía Puenzo & Nicolás Puenzo	27 February 2022
2	2	"Jocelyn"	Lucía Puenzo & Nicolás Puenzo	27 February 2022
3	3	"Angeles"	Nicolás Puenzo	6 March 2022
4	4	"Isabel"	Jimena Montemayor & Sílvia Quer	13 March 2022
5	5	"Luisa"	Jimena Montemayor & Sílvia Quer	20 March 2022
6	6	"Concepción"	Sílvia Quer & Jimena Montemayor	27 March 2022
7	7	"Dolores"	Nicolás Puenzo	3 April 2022
8	8	"La Final"	Sílvia Quer & Jimena Montemayor	10 April 2022

=== Season 2 (2024) ===
No. overall	No. in season	Title	Directed by	Original release date
9	1	"Episode 1"	Unknown	13 March 2024
10	2	"Episode 2"	Unknown	13 March 2024
11	3	"Episode 3"	Unknown	13 March 2024
12	4	"Episode 4"	Unknown	13 March 2024
13	5	"Episode 5"	Unknown	13 March 2024
14	6	"Episode 6"	Unknown	13 March 2024
15	7	"Episode 7"	Unknown	13 March 2024
16	8	"Episode 8"	Unknown	13 March 2024

== Production ==
=== Development ===
On 3 August 2020, Señorita México was announced as one of Starz's first international original series for its Starzplay streaming service. On 29 April 2021, it was announced that filming had begun and that the series title had been changed to Señorita 89. On 23 December 2021, it was announced that the series would premiere on 27 February 2022. On 12 October 2022, Lionsgate+ renewed the series for a second season. In February 2024, Universal+ acquired the rights to the series following the shutdown of Lionsgate+. The second season premiered on 13 March 2024.

=== Casting ===
On 29 April 2021, the complete cast was announced.

== Awards and nominations ==
Year	Award	Category	Nominated	Result	Ref
2022	Produ Awards	Best Social and Political Series	Señorita 89	Nominated	
2022	Produ Awards	Best Lead Actress - Historical, Political or Social Drama Series	Ilse Salas	Nominated	
2022	Produ Awards	Best Showrunner	Lucía Puenzo	Nominated	
2022	Produ Awards	Best Screenplay - Series	María Renée Prudencio, Tatiana Mereñuk, and Lucía Puenzo	Nominated	
2022	Produ Awards	Best Creative Directing	Daniela Schneider	Won	
2022	Produ Awards	Best Period Recreation	Annaí Ramos	Nominated	
