= Isla brava (TV series) =

- Genre: Thriller
- Created by: Esther Feldman
- Written by: Esther Feldman; Marisel Lloberas; Carlos Algara; Mariana Levy
- Directed by: Pitipol Ybarra
- Starring: Fernanda Castillo; Erik Hayser; Flavio Medina; Bárbara López; Karena Flores; Ludwika Paleta; Osvaldo Benavides
- Composer: Pablo Borghi
- Country of origin: Mexico
- Original language: Spanish
- No. of seasons: 2
- No. of episodes: 16

Production
- Executive producers: Gonzalo Sagardía; Santiago de la Rica; Harvey Grisalez; Rodrigo Trujillo; Pitipol Ybarra; Carla Gomez; Vincenzo Gratteri
- Production company: Onza Américas

Original release
- Network: Vix
- Release: 18 May 2023 – 11 July 2025

Isla brava is a Mexican thriller streaming television series created by Esther Feldman, and is produced by Onza Américas. The series stars Fernanda Castillo, Erik Hayser, and Flavio Medina. It premiered on Vix on 18 May 2023. In June 2024, the series was renewed for a second season that premiered on 11 July 2025.

== Cast ==
=== Main ===
- Fernanda Castillo as Lucía
- Erik Hayser as Bruno
- Flavio Medina as Alfredo
- Bárbara López as Pilar
- Karena Flores as Mora
- Ludwika Paleta as Camila Soler (season 2)
- Osvaldo Benavides as Ricardo Sánchez Cruz (season 2)

=== Recurring and guest stars ===
- Juan Pablo Fuentes as Thiago
- Pablo Astiazarán as Jesús
- Rubén Sanz as Damián Rocha
- Renata Ybarra as Josefina
- Romina Poza as Sofía
- Getsemani Vela as Valentina
- Marta Belmonte as Samantha Cruz
- Lorenza Weber as Guadalupe
- José Pescina as Suré Amaité
- Albi de Abreu as Lorenzo Barrientos
- Miguel Brocca as Stefano Torres
- Úrsula Murayama as Concepción Solís
- Gabriela Montaraz as Rosario
- Maggi Briz as Susana Velez
- Álvaro Roig as Gustavo Larralde
- Nadia Zúñiga as Beatriz
- José Roberto Díaz as Mario Torres
- Adrián Sets as Diego Barrientos
- Paula Serrano as Mercedes Azcurra
- Víctor Oliveira as Commissioner López
- Isa Seriñá as Yolis
- Verónica Gregory as Juliana
- Martín Brasseco as Este*
- Roberto Mateos as Guillermo Páez (season 2)
- Mauricio Hénao as Leonel (season 2)

== Production ==
On 8 August 2022, it was announced that production had begun on the series in Tenerife, Spain. On 14 September 2022, a complete cast list was announced. Filming concluded on 4 November 2022. On 28 April 2023, Vix released an official trailer for the series. The series premiered on 18 May 2023. On 3 June 2024, Vix renewed the series for a second season. The second season premiered on 11 July 2025.

== Episodes ==
Season	Episodes	Originally released
1	8	18 May 2023
2	8	11 July 2025

=== Season 1 (2023) ===
No. overall	No. in season	Title	Original release date
1	1	"La familia perfecta"	18 May 2023
2	2	"El rescate"	18 May 2023
3	3	"¿Quién mató a Alfredo?"	25 May 2023
4	4	"Atrapada en una pesadilla"	25 May 2023
5	5	"No todos tienen buena suerte"	1 June 2023
6	6	"La carta robada"	1 June 2023
7	7	"La iniciación"	8 June 2023
8	8	"La verdad de la noche de la fiesta"	8 June 2023

=== Season 2 (2025) ===
No. overall	No. in season	Title	Original release date
9	1	"El hombre más inocente del mundo"	11 July 2025
10	2	"Camila"	11 July 2025
11	3	"Cuenta numerada"	11 July 2025
12	4	"La llamada inesperada"	11 July 2025
13	5	"Una pequeña esperanza"	11 July 2025
14	6	"La fiesta mexicana"	11 July 2025
15	7	"Descubrimientos"	11 July 2025
16	8	"¿Será justicia?"	11 July 2025

== Awards and nominations ==
Year	Award	Category	Nominated	Result	Ref
2024	Produ Awards	Best Drama Series	Isla brava	Won	
2024	Produ Awards	Best Lead Actress - Drama Series	Fernanda Castillo	Nominated	
2024	Produ Awards	Best Lead Actor - Drama Series	Erik Hayser	Nominated	
2024	Produ Awards	Best Supporting Actress - Drama Series	Bárbara López	Nominated	
2024	Produ Awards	Best Directing - Drama Series	Pitipol Ybarra	Nominated	
2024	Produ Awards	Best Screenplay - Drama Series	Esther Feldman	Nominated	
