= Black Tide (film) =

2018 film by Érick Zonca

- Film poster
- French: Fleuve noir
- Directed by: Érick Zonca
- Written by: Dror Mishani
- Starring: Vincent Cassel; Romain Duris; Sandrine Kiberlain
- Release dates: 6 April 2018 (Beaune Film Festival); 18 July 2018
- Running time: 113 minutes
- Country: France
- Language: French

Black Tide (French: Fleuve noir) is a 2018 French film directed by Érick Zonca, and starring Vincent Cassel, Romain Duris and Sandrine Kiberlain in lead roles. It was adapted from Israeli writer Dror Mishani's book, The Missing File.

== Cast ==
- Vincent Cassel as François Visconti
- Romain Duris as Yann Bellaile
- Sandrine Kiberlain as Solange Arnault

== Reception ==
The film received mixed reviews, who praised it for its impressive character study.
