= Bárbara López =

Mexican actress

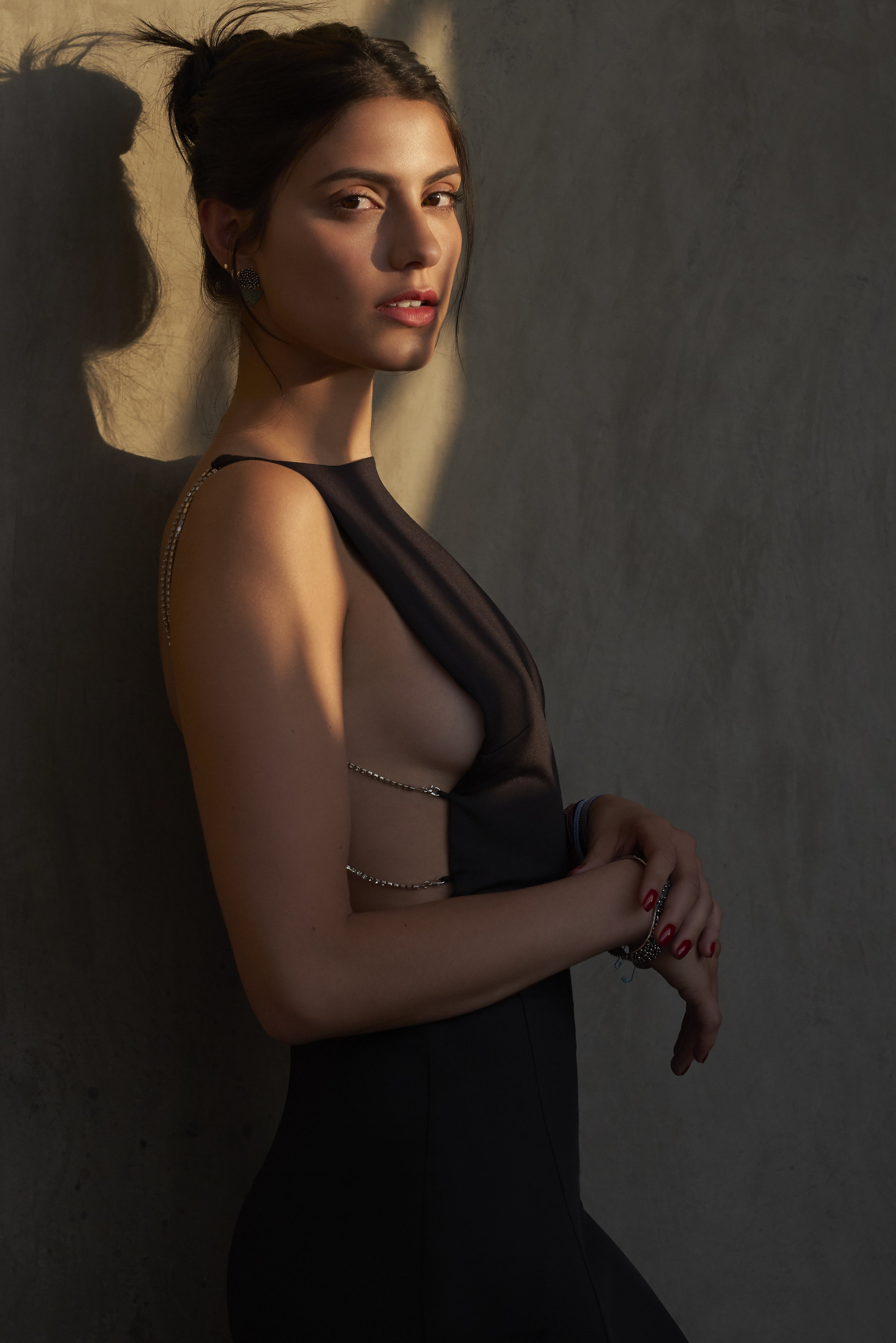
- Born: Bárbara Elizabeth López Pérez; 13 August 1992 (age 34); Monterrey, Nuevo Leon, Mexico
- Occupation: Actress
- Years active: 2015–present

Bárbara Elizabeth López Pérez (born 13 August 1992), best known as Bárbara López is a Mexican actress best known for her role as Juliana Valdés in the crime drama television series Love to Death (2018–2019). Her other notable TV roles include Lucero Gutiérrez Vega in the Televisa romantic telenovela Un camino hacia el destino (2016), Érika Ballesteros in the telenovela Vino el amor (2016–2017), and María Cruz in the Televisa's comedy telenovela Papá a toda madre (2017–2018) and Dolores in the Pantaya original series Señorita 89. López is the daughter of renowned Mexican producer Reynaldo López.

== Filmography ==
Film roles
Year	Title	Roles	Notes
2018	Sweet Caroline	College student	
2019	En las buenas y en las malas	Dany	
2020	El mesero	Mariana	
2021	Cuatro paredes	Karla	Short, Drama
2022	Misterio en Marbella	Anita	Romance
2023	Nada Que Ver	Johanna	
2023	Papá o Mamá	Julieta	
2024	Dudas en la puerta	Ana	Short, Drama
2024	Straight	Elia	
TBA	Todavía Conmigo	Mariana	

Television roles
Year	Title	Roles	Notes
2015	Amor de barrio	Bárbara Cánseco	Recurring role; 6 episodes
2016	Un camino hacia el destino	Lucero Gutiérrez Vega	Recurring role; 63 episodes
2016–2017	Vino el amor	Érika Ballesteros	Recurring role; 67 episodes
2017–2018	Papá a toda madre	María Cruz	Recurring role; 30 episodes
2018–2019	Love to Death	Juliana Valdés	Main role; 88 episodes
2019	Juliantina	Juliana Valdés	Main role; 19 episodes
2020	Unstoppable	Rocío	Main role; 10 episodes
2022	Señorita 89	Dolores	Main role
2023	Isla brava	Pilar	
2024	¿Quién lo mató?	Susana	
2025	Los hilos del pasado	Cristina	Main role

== Awards and nominations ==
Year	Award	Category	Work	Result	Ref
2017	35th TVyNovelas Awards	Best Female Revelation	Vino el amor	Won	
2019	37th TVyNovelas Awards	Best Young Lead Actress	Amar a muerte	Won	
2019	Eres Awards	Best Actress	Amar a muerte	Nominated	
2019	Eres Awards	Best Kiss (with Macarena Achaga)	Amar a muerte	Nominated	
2019	MTV Millennial Awards	Couple on Fire (with Macarena Achaga)	Amar a muerte	Won	
2019	MTV Millennial Awards	Best Fandom (Juliantina)	Amar a muerte	Won	
2019	E! Online TV Scoop Awards	Best Couple (with Macarena Achaga)	Amar a muerte	Won	
2019	E! Online TV Scoop Awards	Best Fandom (Juliantina)	Amar a muerte	Won	
2019	Kids' Choice Awards México	Chica trendy	Herself	Won	
