= Doménica Montero (2025 TV series) =

- Genre: Telenovela
- Based on: Doménica Montero by Caridad Bravo Adams
- Developed by: Ximena Suárez; Julián Aguilar
- Written by: Edwin Valencia; Isabel de Sara
- Directed by: Carlos Cock Marín; Juan Pablo Blanco; Carlos Santos
- Starring: Angelique Boyer; Marcus Ornellas; Scarlet Gruber; Brandon Peniche
- Theme music composer: Omar Angulo Robles; Johan Sotelo
- Opening theme: "Ahí estabas tú" by Carín León
- Composers: Álvaro Trespalacios; Jorge Tena; Carlos Paramo
- Country of origin: Mexico
- Original language: Spanish
- No. of seasons: 1
- No. of episodes: 50

Production
- Executive producer: Carlos Bardasano
- Producer: Carmen Cecilia Urbaneja
- Cinematography: Luis García; Mauricio Sánchez
- Editor: Alba Merchán Hamann
- Camera setup: Multi-camera
- Production company: TelevisaUnivision

Original release
- Network: Univision
- Release: 8 December 2025 – 17 February 2026

Related
- La Dueña (1995); Soy tu dueña (2010)

Doménica Montero is a Mexican telenovela produced by Carlos Bardasano for TelevisaUnivision. It is based on the 1978 telenovela of the same name, itself an adaptation of the 1972 Venezuelan telenovela La doña. The series stars Angelique Boyer, Marcus Ornellas, Scarlet Gruber and Brandon Peniche. It aired on Univision from 8 December 2025 to 17 February 2026. In Mexico, the series aired on Las Estrellas from 19 January 2026 to 27 March 2026.

== Plot ==
Doménica Montero is a renowned and respected businesswoman in Puebla. She has made her life a platform for supporting those most in need. An orphan since she was seven, she was raised by her aunt Pilar alongside her cousin Kiara, an envious and manipulative woman who feigns affection while plotting against her. Doménica falls in love with Max Languer, an apparent restaurant entrepreneur who charms her and convinces her to marry him. But Max, in cahoots with Kiara, his lover, only wants to steal her fortune. On her wedding day, Doménica is abandoned at the altar, and the scandal becomes national news thanks to a campaign orchestrated by Kiara, who ridicules her as "La Abandonada" (The Abandoned One).

Humiliated, betrayed, and made the target of widespread gossip, Doménica leaves Puebla and takes refuge in La Joya, an old coffee plantation inherited from her parents, which she symbolically renames La Abandonada. There, ready to start from scratch, she confronts Genaro Peña, a corrupt foreman who has run the property with shady dealings. In this new rural setting, Doménica meets Luis Fernando, the owner of the neighboring estate, Espejo de Luna. A widower with a painful past, he has also returned to the countryside with the aim of recovering the property that belonged to his father.

An explosive relationship develops between Doménica and Luis Fernando, marked by pride, misunderstandings, and a growing attraction. As they fight over land and boundaries, they also discover that they share a common desire: to rebuild, heal, and give new meaning to their lives. However, when Doménica begins to open her heart, her past returns to threaten everything. Max reappears, trying to win Doménica back.

== Cast ==
=== Main ===
- Angelique Boyer as Doménica Montero Rivas
- Marcus Ornellas as Luis Fernando Jiménez Lara
- Scarlet Gruber as Kiara Salerno Rivas
- Brandon Peniche as Genaro Peña López
- Diego Amozurrutia as Max Languer de la Vega
- Arcelia Ramírez as Nicolasa González Díaz
- Alberto Estrella as Prudencio Pérez Hernández
- Nuria Bages as Mercedes Lara
- Alejandro Tommasi as Andrés Solana Cruz
- Veronica Merchant as Pilar Rivas Peraza
- Alejandro Ávila as Gabriel Cadena Ruiz
- Paola Toyos as Herminia Ortiz de Cadena
- Javier Ponce as Osvaldo Cadena Ortiz
- Renata Rivas as María Cadena Ortiz
- Arleth Terán as Fuensanta Ordaz de Acosta
- Fermín Martínez as Cosme Acosta Juárez
- María Fernanda García as Diana Torres
- Gonzalo Peña as Roberto Sangenís
- Gaby Mellado as Blanca Aranda Mayo
- José Manuel Rincón as Ernesto Solana Macías
- Daniela Cordero as Silvia Domínguez Buitrón
- Regina Villaverde as Adelaida Nava Pérez
- Graco Sendel as Pedro Sánchez Molina
- Ana de Villa as Nieves Peña Gómez
- Boris Duflos as Bartolo Reyes Silva
- Olivia Duflos as Rosita Reyes Zúñiga
- María de Villa as Tomasa Zúñiga de Silva
- Iván Ochoa as Pánfilo Castillo
- Néstor Rodulfo as Roque Cárdenas
- Javo Benitez as Simón Rojas

=== Recurring and guest stars ===
- Alejandra Robles Gil as Paula
- Estefanía Villarreal as Gina
- Ligia Uriarte as Sofía
- Pilar Ixquic Mata as Agata
- Abril Schreiber as Elisa Montes
- Fernando Ciangherotti as Olivier
- Leonardo Daniel as José Rebollo Flores
- Otto Sirgo as Judge
- Marcelo Córdoba as Sebastián
- Juan Carlos Colombo as Father Serafín
- César Évora as Señor Valverde
- Ahmed García as Rafita
- Fátima Tejeda as Lupita
- Camila Méndez as Julia
- Eduardo Reza as Dr. Ramiro Beristain

== Production ==
On 26 April 2025, it was announced that Angelique Boyer would star in a remake of the 1978 telenovela Doménica Montero. On 9 May 2025, Scarlet Gruber was announced as the antagonist of the story. On 13 May 2025, the telenovela was presented at TelevisaUnivision's upfront for the 2025–2026 television season. The following week, Marcus Ornellas and Brandon Peniche were announced to star opposite of Boyer. A cast list was published on 13 June 2025. Filming of the telenovela took place from 4 July to 24 October 2025.

== Ratings ==
=== Mexico ratings ===
Viewership and ratings per season of Doménica Montero
Season	Timeslot (CT)	Episodes	First aired		Last aired		Avg. viewers (millions)
Season	Timeslot (CT)	Episodes	Date	Viewers (millions)	Date	Viewers (millions)	Avg. viewers (millions)
1	Mon–Fri 9:30 p.m.	50	19 January 2026	4.77	27 March 2026	5.20	4.61

== Episodes ==
No.	Title	U.S. air date	Mexico air date	Mexico viewers (millions)
1	"Boda millonaria"	8 December 2025	19 January 2026	4.77
2	"Corazones rotos"	9 December 2025	20 January 2026	4.69
3	"La antigua hacienda"	10 December 2025	21 January 2026	4.89
4	"Promesas disfrazadas"	11 December 2025	22 January 2026	5.20
5	"Amenaza o advertencia"	12 December 2025	23 January 2026	4.68
6	"El escándalo de Doménica"	15 December 2025	26 January 2026	4.82
7	"Prioridades"	16 December 2025	27 January 2026	4.87
8	"Veneno y envidia"	17 December 2025	28 January 2026	4.88
9	"Dictamen médico"	18 December 2025	29 January 2026	4.96
10	"Enemigos"	19 December 2025	30 January 2026	5.09
11	"La abandonada"	22 December 2025	2 February 2026	4.42
12	"Un nuevo amor"	23 December 2025	3 February 2026	4.40
13	"Mi mayor problema"	24 December 2025	4 February 2026	4.39
14	"Con el corazón"	25 December 2025	5 February 2026	4.73
15	"Asuntos personales"	26 December 2025	6 February 2026	4.24
16	"Coqueteo y amor"	29 December 2025	9 February 2026	4.45
17	"El mejor postor"	30 December 2025	10 February 2026	4.48
18	"La cosecha de frijol"	1 January 2026	11 February 2026	4.68
19	"Lo peor de mi"	2 January 2026	12 February 2026	4.71
20	"Secretos del pasado"	5 January 2026	13 February 2026	4.09
21	"El centro social"	6 January 2026	16 February 2026	4.49
22	"Pedro de nadie"	7 January 2026	17 February 2026	4.48
23	"Una persona especial"	8 January 2026	18 February 2026	4.51
24	"Un mal sueño"	9 January 2026	19 February 2026	4.51
25	"Orden de aprehensión"	12 January 2026	20 February 2026	4.11
26	"Dignidad y orgullo"	13 January 2026	23 February 2026	4.48
27	"La maldición de Max"	14 January 2026	24 February 2026	4.87
28	"Amores del pasado"	15 January 2026	25 February 2026	4.24
29	"Mi otro socio"	16 January 2026	26 February 2026	4.60
30	"El dueño de mi corazón"	19 January 2026	27 February 2026	4.19
31	"Sólo negocios"	20 January 2026	2 March 2026	4.46
32	"Un anillo de compromiso"	21 January 2026	3 March 2026	4.53
33	"Entrega total"	22 January 2026	4 March 2026	4.31
34	"Lo más importante"	23 January 2026	5 March 2026	4.39
35	"Título falso"	26 January 2026	6 March 2026	4.39
36	"Borracha de amor"	27 January 2026	9 March 2026	4.87
37	"Doble cara"	28 January 2026	10 March 2026	4.56
38	"Otra salida"	29 January 2026	11 March 2026	4.99
39	"Apuesta por el amor"	30 January 2026	12 March 2026	4.80
40	"Divorcio"	2 February 2026	13 March 2026	4.55
41	"Trato amargo"	3 February 2026	16 March 2026	4.68
42	"Una prueba de confianza"	4 February 2026	17 March 2026	4.31
43	"Promesa eterna"	5 February 2026	18 March 2026	4.85
44	"Las verdaderas pruebas"	9 February 2026	19 March 2026	4.18
45	"Prófugo"	10 February 2026	20 March 2026	4.49
46	"Sin filtro"	11 February 2026	23 March 2026	4.29
47	"La leona y la oveja"	12 February 2026	24 March 2026	4.53
48	"Corazón negro"	13 February 2026	25 March 2026	4.81
49	"La luz de la verdad"	16 February 2026	26 March 2026	5.14
50	"Hacienda del Encanto"	17 February 2026	27 March 2026	5.20

== Release ==
Doménica Montero premiered first in the United States on Univision on 8 December 2025. In Mexico, the series premiered on Las Estrellas on 19 January 2026.
