= Gabriel Porras =

Mexican actor (born 1968)

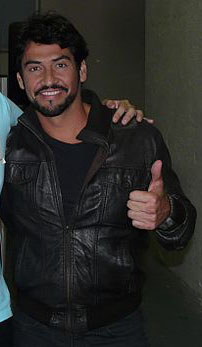
- Born: Carlos Gabriel Porras Flores; February 13, 1968 (age 58); Mexico City, Mexico
- Occupation: Actor
- Years active: 1994–present
- Spouse: Sonya Smith (m. 2008; div. 2013)

Carlos Gabriel Porras Flores (born February 13, 1968) is a Mexican actor. He began his career working for TV Azteca in telenovelas like Tres veces Sofia along with Mexican diva Lucía Méndez and El tío Alberto. His acting career strengthened when he played his first protagonist role in El alma herida, a telenovela, produced by Telemundo which is owned by NBC Universal. In El alma herida he shared credits along with Mexican actress Itatí Cantoral with whom he had a relationship in real life.

Gabriel Porras has often played villains.

== Personal life ==
Gabriel Porras is the eldest of 3 siblings, Marina and Francisco Porras. He married American-born actress Sonya Smith (his co-star in the telenovela Olvidarte Jamas) popular in Venezuelan television drama on February 29, 2008. They announced their divorce on June 24, 2013.

== Filmography ==
=== Film ===
Year	Title	Roles	Notes
1999	En un claroscuro de la luna	Olegario	
2000	El interminable submarino amarillo	José	Short film
2001	Perro negro	Moncho	Short film
2004	Puerto Vallarta Squeeze	Federale	
2004	Zapato	Unknown role	Short film
2004	El fin del sur	Emiliano Zapata	Short film
2005	Reflejos	The Guy in The Bathroom	
2005	Mi nombre es Ringo	Ringo	
2005	It's Not Easy Being A Wolf Boy		
2006	La reportera salvaje	José Luis Fernández	
2006	La vida inmune	Andrés	
2007	La misma luna	Paco	
2007	The World's Heaviest Man		
2008	Al fin y al cabo	El Agente Wilson	
2010	Hunted by Night	Gabriel	
2011	Monsenor: The Last Journey of Oscar Romero		
2012	Unknowns	Detective Ramírez	
2020	Patricia Secretos De Una Pasion	Humberto	

=== Television roles ===
Year	Title	Roles	Notes	Ref
1998	La casa del naranjo	Damián		
1998	Tres veces Sofía	Germán Lizarralde		
1999	Cuentos para solitarios	Javier	Episode: "Marisol en la playa, frente al mar y algunas rocas"	
2000	El tío Alberto	Pedro		
2000	Todo por amor	Alejandro		
2002	Feliz navidad mamá	Mariano		
2002	Por ti	José		
2003	Ladrón de corazones	Román		
2003–2004	El alma herida	Juan Manuel Mendoza	Main role; 151 episodes	
2004	Prisionera	Daniel Moncada	Main role; 88 episodes	
2005–2007	The Days of Pets	Raul the Parrot	Voice role; 54 episodes	
2006	Olvidarte jamás	Diego Ibarra	Main role; 112 episodes	
2006	Campeones de la vida	Guido Guevara	Recurring role; 64 episodes	
2007	Madre Luna	Leonardo Cisneros	Main role; 141 episodes	
2008	Sin senos no hay paraíso	Fernando Rey	Supporting role; 14 episodes	
2008–2009	El Rostro de Analía	Ricardo Rivera / Ricky Montana	Main cast; 157 episodes	
2010	¿Dónde está Elisa?	Mariano Altamira	Main role; 106 episodes	
2011	La Reina del Sur	Roberto Gato Marquez / El Gato Fierros	Supporting role; 14 episodes	
2011–2012	La casa de al lado	Gonzalo Ibáñez / Iñaki Mora / Roberto Acosta	Main role; 165 episodes	
2012–2013	Corazón valiente	Miguel Valdez Gutiérrez	Main role	
2014–2015	Los miserables	Olegario Marrero "El Diablo" / Rafael Montes	Main cast; 117 episodes	
2013	El Señor de los Cielos	Marco Mejía	Main role (Season 1); 74 episodes	
2015–2016	Bajo el mismo cielo	Carlos Martínez	Main role; 122 episodes	
2017	La Fan	Gabriel Bustamante	Main role; 125 episodes	
2017	Mariposa de Barrio	Pedro Rivera	Main role; 91 episodes	
2017	Milagros de Navidad	José Vargas	Episode: "In-feliz Navidad"	
2018	Al otro lado del muro	Ernesto Martínez	Main cast; 78 episodes	
2019	You Cannot Hide	Carlos De la Cruz	Recurring role; 10 episodes	
2021	Así se baila	Himself	Participant	
2022	Amores que engañan	Roberto	Episode: "Mía solo mía"	
2024	El precio de amarte	Jorge Nieto		

== Awards and nominations ==
Year	Award	Category	Works	Result
2012	Tu Mundo Awards	Favorite Lead Actor	La casa de al lado	Nominated
2014	People en Español Awards	Best Male Antagonist	Los miserables	Nominated
2015	Tu Mundo Awards	The Best Bad Boy – Novela	Los miserables	Nominated
2016	Tu Mundo Awards	Favorite Lead Actor – Novela	Bajo el mismo cielo	Won
2016	Tu Mundo Awards	The Perfect Couple (with Maria Elisa Camargo)	Bajo el mismo cielo	Nominated
2016	Tu Mundo Awards	The Best Actor with Bad Luck	Bajo el mismo cielo	Nominated
