= Doménica Montero (1978 TV series) =

Mexican telenovela

- Genre: Telenovela
- Based on: La doña by Inés Rodena
- Developed by: Caridad Bravo Adams
- Directed by: Lorenzo de Rodas
- Starring: Irán Eory; Rogelio Guerra; Raquel Olmedo
- Country of origin: Mexico
- Original language: Spanish
- No. of episodes: 30

Production
- Executive producer: Valentín Pimstein
- Cinematography: Carlos S. Zúñiga
- Production company: Televisa

Original release
- Network: Canal 2
- Release: 1978

Related
- La Dueña (1995); Soy tu dueña (2010); Doménica Montero (2025)

Doménica Montero is a Mexican telenovela produced by Valentín Pimstein for Televisa in 1978.

== Cast ==
- Irán Eory - Doménica Montero
- Rogelio Guerra - José María Robles Olmos
- Raquel Olmedo - Norma Ornales Campo-Miranda
- Xavier Marc - Genaro Peña
- Beatriz Aguirre
- Rosario Gálvez
- Antonio Bravo
- Gaston Tuset
- Ernesto Yañez
- Alejandro Rabago
- Blas García
- Amalia Llergo
