= Dror Mishani =

Israeli writer and translator

Dror Mishani דרור משעני
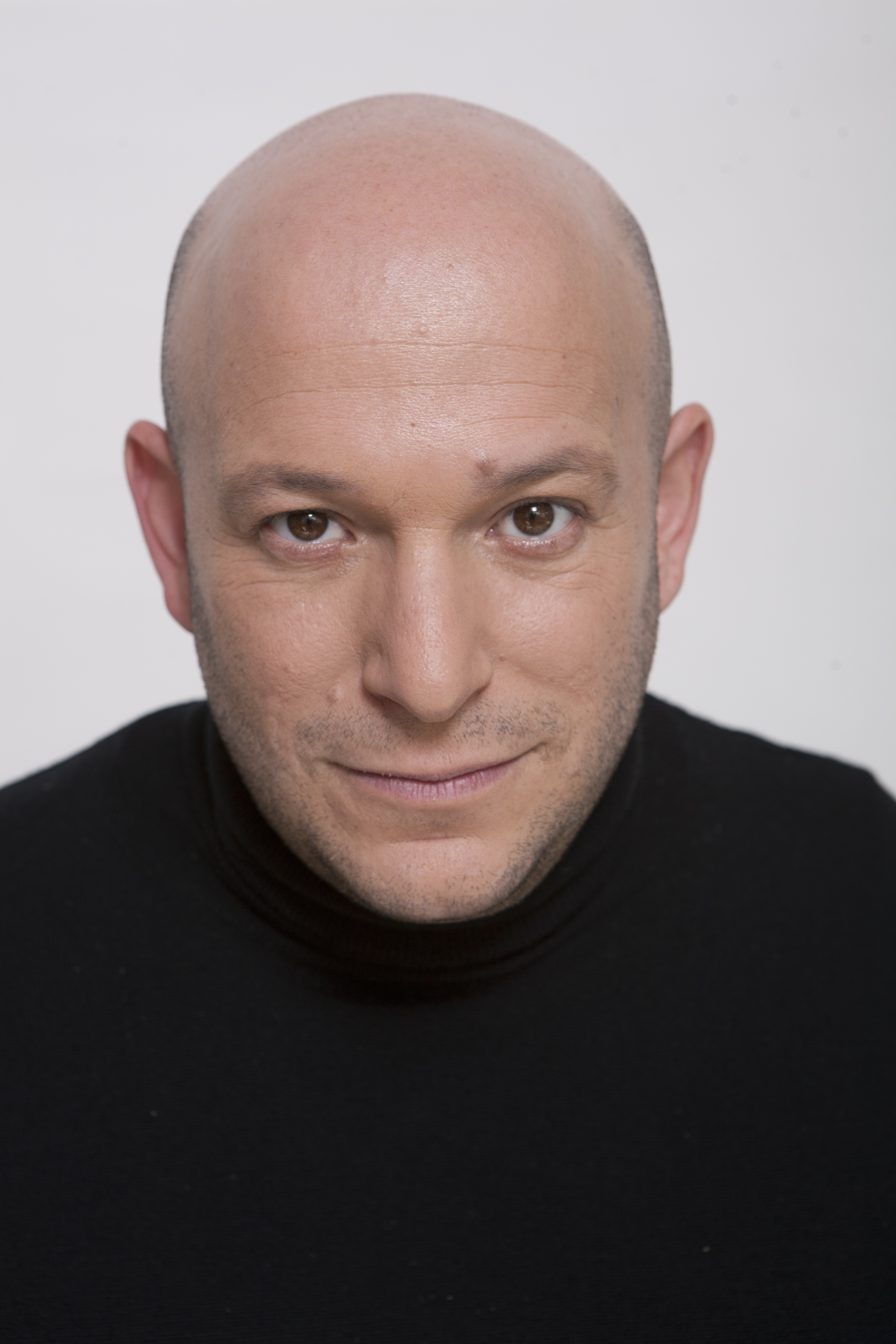
- Born: 23 June 1975 (age 51); Holon, Israel
- Occupation: Novelist
- Writing career
- Genre: Crime fiction
- Subjects: Crime, thriller, mystery
- Notable works: The Missing File, A Possibility of Violence
- Website: d-a-mishani.com

Dror Mishani (Hebrew: דרור משעני; born 23 June 1975) is an Israeli crime writer, translator and literary scholar, specializing in the history of detective fiction.

His series of crime fiction, featuring police inspector Avraham Avraham, was first published in Hebrew in 2011 and is translated to over 15 languages, including English, Swedish and German.

The first novel in the series, The Missing File, was short listed for the 2013 CWA International Dagger award and won the Martin Beck Award, for the best translated crime novel in Sweden. Mishani's second novel, A Possibility of Violence, was the first crime novel on Sapir prize's (Israeli Booker) shortlist and won the Bernstein Prize for best Hebrew novel of the year. The third novel in the series, The Man Who Wanted to Know Everything, was published in Hebrew in May 2015. In 2018 film director Erick Zonca took his novel The Missing File as a basis for Black Tide [Fleuve noir].

Mishani's wife is originally from Poland. While she was teaching in Cambridge, Mishani's plan was to finish his doctoral dissertation, but he ended up writing The Missing File. Afterward, he attempted to write the dissertation, but instead wrote the second novel.

Mishani lives with his wife and two children in Tel Aviv.

== Bibliography ==
- Tik Ne'edar (2011; English translation by Steven Cohen: The Missing File, 2013)
- Efsharut shel Alimut (2013; English translation by Todd Hasak-Lowy: A Possibility of Violence, 2014)
- Haish sheratza ladaat hakol (2015; English translation by Todd Hasak-Lowy: The Man Who Wanted to Know Everything, 2016)
- Shalosh (2018; English translation by Jessica Cohen: Three, 2020)
- Emuna (2021; English translation by Jessica Cohen: Conviction, 2022)
