= Erik Hayser =

Actor, producer, writer and entrepreneur

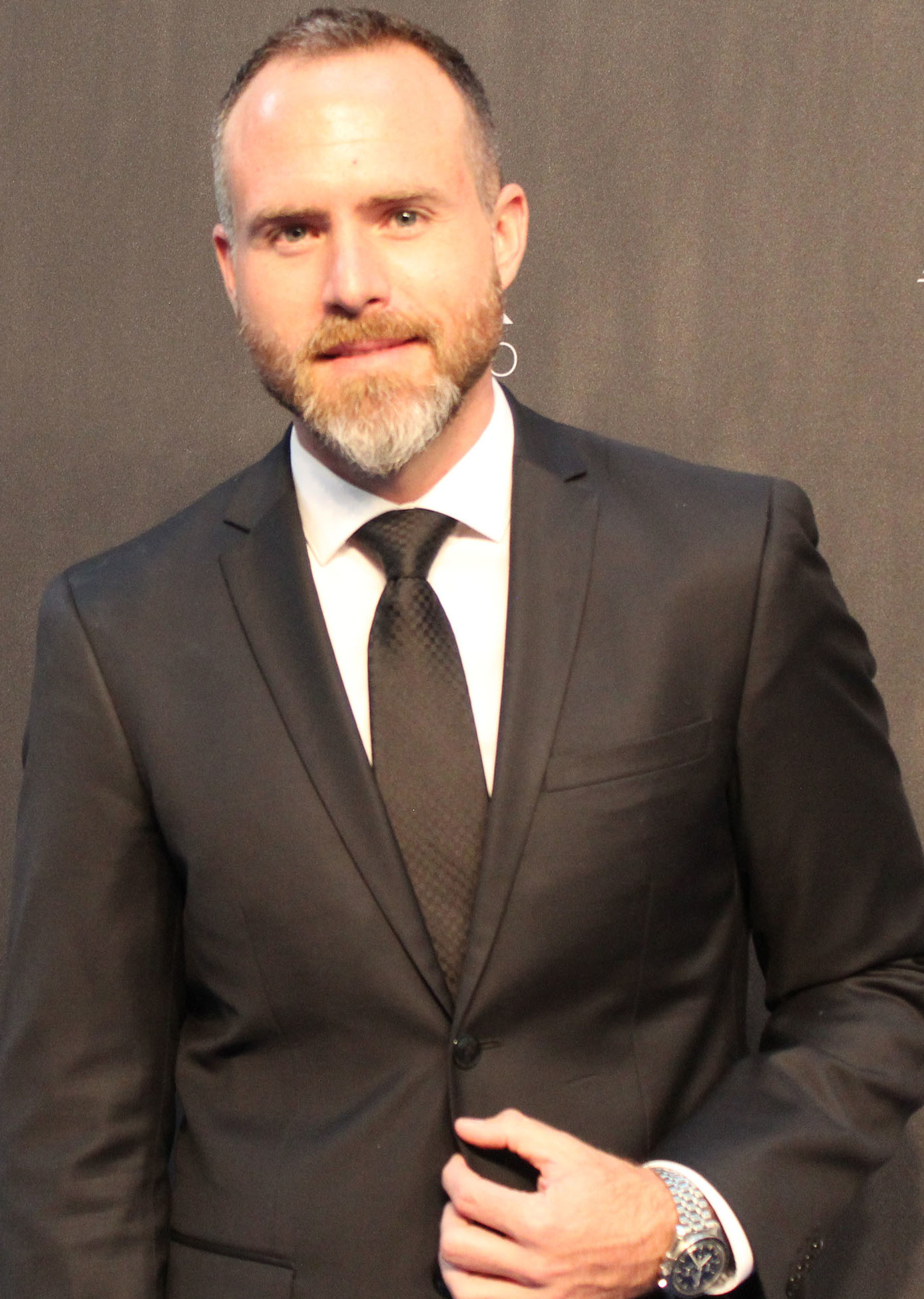
- Hayser at the 2019 Metropolitan Theatre Awards
- Born: 13 December 1980 (age 45); Santiago de Querétaro, Querétaro, Mexico
- Occupations: Actor, writer, producer
- Years active: 2001–present

Erik Hayser (born December 13, 1980, in Santiago de Querétaro, Querétaro, Mexico), is a Mexican actor, writer and producer. He studied acting at the Centro de Formación Actoral (CEFAC). He is internationally recognized for his role as Diego Nava Martinez in the Mexican political drama Ingobernable. He began his acting career in TV Azteca telenovelas.

== Filmography ==
=== Film roles ===
Year	Title	Roles	Notes
2009	Sin retorno	Chespi	Also as producer and writer
2017	El que busca encuentra	Jorge Ashby	
2018	Ya veremos	Enrique	
2019	En las buenas y en las malas	Roy	

=== Television roles ===
Year	Title	Roles	Notes
2004	Soñarás	Eric	
2005	La vida es una canción	Unknown role	
2006	Ángel, las alas del amor	Iván	
2007	Mientras haya vida	Daniel	
2008	Alma legal	Flavio	
2008	Cambio de vida	René	2 episodes
2010	Bienes raíces	Manuel	Episode: "Vas a estar bien"
2010	Capadocia	Andrés Soto	Episode: "Señor, ¿por qué me has abandonado?"
2010	Las Aparicio	Alejandro López Cano	Series regular; 120 episodes
2011–2012	El octavo mandamiento	Diego San Millán	
2012–2013	Dulce amargo	Nicolás Fernández Leal	Main role; 118 episodes
2014	Camelia la Texana	Emilio Varela / Aarón Varela	Main role; 37 episodes
2014–2015	Los miserables	Daniel Ponce	Main role; 119 episodes
2015	Caminos de Guanajuato	Gilberto Coronel	Main role; 65 episodes
2016–2017	La Hermandad	Alejandro	Recurring role (seasons 1–2); 16 episodes
2017	Drunk History	Gonzalo Guerrero	Episode: "El español maya y la mano de Obregón"
2017–2018	Sense8	Raoul	Recurring role (seasons 1–2); 6 episodes
2017–2018	Ingobernable	President Diego Nava	Series regular (seasons 1–2); 20 episodes
2018	El Recluso	Jeremy Jones	Series regular; 6 episodes
2019	Preso No. 1	President Carmelo Alvarado	Main role; 44 episodes
2020–2022	Dark Desire	Esteban Solares	Main role
2023	Isla brava	Bruno	Main role
2025	Pecados inconfesables	Claudio Martínez	Main role

== Theater ==
- Departamento de solteros (2002)
- Encuentros (2007–08)
- El hombre perfecto (2007–09)
