= Marcos Santana =

American television executive

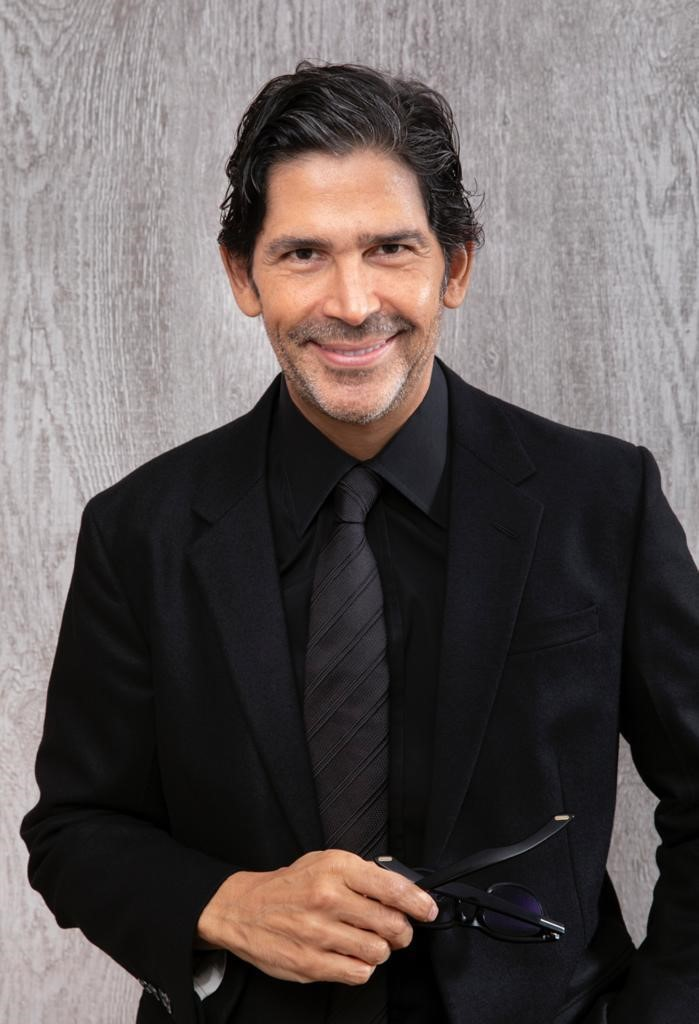
- Born: 1965 (age 60–61); Caracas, Venezuela
- Education: Universidad Central, Universidad Santa Maria, Spain (Master’s, copyright law)
- Occupations: Entrepreneur, producer and media creative
- Children: 1

Marcos Santana (born 1965) is a Venezuelan entrepreneur, producer and media creative, former president of NBCUniversal Telemundo Enterprises’ Telemundo Global Studios and Telemundo Internacional.

In his role as president of Telemundo Global Studios, Santana was in charge of Telemundo Studios, Telemundo International Studios and Telemundo Streaming Studios, the divisions responsible for Telemundo's scripted production both domestically and internationally.

As president of Telemundo Internacional, Santana led international content distribution efforts for the Mexican region, oversaw international distribution efforts and identified coproduction and partnership opportunities for the development of Telemundo content.

== Early life and education ==
Santana was born in Caracas, Venezuela, to an economist and a homemaker. He is the youngest of five brothers. He holds a law degree and a master's degree in copyright from Universidad Central, Universidad Santa Maria, Spain.

== Career and accomplishments ==
Santana began his career in the legal department of French telecommunications company Sofretu. In 1987, he co-founded the production and distribution company Tepuy International to distribute formats, cartoons, series, telenovelas and other Spanish-language content in Europe, Asia, Africa and South America.

Tepuy International began making and distributing documentaries and animated shows, but soon branched out into telenovelas. The company found a niche between larger distributors like Televisa and TV Globo to bring Hispanic shows, mostly telenovelas, to the European market. and obtained the distribution rights in 1993 to several popular Colombian telenovelas from RTI Colombia, Coestrellas, Jes, Caracol.

In 1994, Tepuy, with offices in Caracas, Madrid and Rome, moved its headquarters to South Florida, eventually settling in Miami, a main hub for Hispanic television in the United States.

Tepuy was involved in the creation and selection of many television projects with companies such as Telemundo-NBC, RTI, Disney, Sony, Caracol TV, Argos, Endemol, Gestmusic, Imagina, Televen, and Televisión Nacional de Chile among others.

Tepuy's collaboration with RTI Colombia led to the company becoming Telemundo's international distribution partner. In 2005, Santana was tapped by Telemundo's president, Don Browne, to head program development at Telemundo Studios in Miami.

In 2006, Telemundo acquired Tepuy and brought the entire company in-house in January 2007 as Telemundo International, with Santana as president.

During Santana's tenure as President of Telemundo International from 2007 to 2017, the company handled the international distribution of U.S.-based Telemundo and Universo's original content, and that of other producers. In 2017, the international distribution operations for Telemundo and UNIVERSO were assumed by NBCUniversal International Distribution for all territories with the exception of Mexico, a region for which Telemundo Internacional maintains exclusive distribution rights.

In 2015, Telemundo Internacional got a deal to be the exclusive distributor of HBO Latin America Originals in Europe, Middle East, Asia, Africa and Oceania and an agreement with Mega Chile giving it exclusive rights for the distribution of the Chilean channel's fiction programs and formats worldwide.

In 2016, NBCUniversal Telemundo Enterprises announced the creation of Telemundo International Studios (TIS), under the direction of Santana as president,

In 2018, NBCUniversal Telemundo Enterprises announced the creation of a new business unit, Telemundo Global Studios, to oversee all operations for Telemundo International Studios (TIS) and Telemundo Studios.

In 2019, NBCUniversal Telemundo Enterprises acquired Underground Producciones, the Argentina-based production company led by Sebastian Ortega, reporting to Marcos Santana, and was responsible for hits including 100 Días Para Enamorarse, as well as the foreign-language Oscar bid, El Ángel.

He is a current board member of these organizations: NBCU-Telemundo; Miami Symphony Orchestra (MISO); G50, headed by Moises Naim; and TVN Panama.

In 2019, Santana celebrated his 30th anniversary in the programming content industry.

== Recognitions ==
- Santana was named one of Adweek's 2011 Most Influential Executives and Personalities in Hispanic Media.
- He was recognized as one of The Imagen Foundation's Most Powerful &amp; Influential Latinos in Entertainment in 2011 and 2012. He was featured as one of the 100 Latinos Miami in 2012 as one of the most relevant executives in Media.
- Santana was recognized by the City of Coral Gables, Florida in February 2018 for his contributions, in both information and entertainment, for his work in furthering the influence of Hispanic culture within the community and with Telemundo.
- In January 2020, during the Natpe Miami tradeshow, Marcos Santana was honored at the 17 th Annual Brandon Tartikoff Legacy Awards.

== Personal life ==
Santana has lived in United States since 1994, is divorced, and has a daughter.
