= Love to Death =

Spanish-language telenovela (2018-2019)

- Genre: Telenovela
- Created by: Leonardo Padrón
- Based on: En cuerpo ajeno by Julio Jiménez
- Written by: Florencia Castillo; Vicente Albarracín; Carlos Eloy Castro
- Directed by: Carlos Cock Marín; Alejandro Lozano; Joe Rendón; Rolando Ocampo
- Starring: Michel Brown; Angelique Boyer; Alejandro Nones; Arturo Barba; Macarena Achaga; Claudia Martín; Jessica Más; Henry Zakka; Nestor Rodulfo; Gonzalo Peña; Roberto Duarte; Cinthia Vázquez; Bárbara López; Cayetano Arámburo; Jessica Díaz; Alexis Ayala
- Music by: Carlos Mármo; Agustín Barreto
- Opening theme: "Me muero" by Carlos Rivera
- Country of origin: México
- Original language: Spanish
- No. of seasons: 1
- No. of episodes: 87

Production
- Executive producer: Carlos Bardasano
- Producers: Aimée Godínez; Fernando Rovzar; Alexis Fridman; Alejandro Lozano; Erica Sánchez Su; Alejandro García; Billy Rovzar
- Production locations: Mexico City; San Antonio, Texas
- Cinematography: Hobardo Chicangana; Gerónimo Denti
- Editor: Fermín Branger
- Camera setup: Multi-camera
- Production companies: W Studios; Lemon Studios

Original release
- Network: Univision; Las Estrellas
- Release: 29 October 2018 – 3 March 2019

Related
- El cuerpo del deseo; En otra piel

Love to Death (Spanish: Amar a muerte) is a Mexican telenovela written by the Venezuelan author Leonardo Padrón and produced by W Studios and Lemon Studios for Televisa and Univision. The series stars Angelique Boyer and Michel Brown.

Principal photography began on 14 June 2018 and ended in December 2018. It premiered on Univision on 29 October 2018, and ended on 11 March 2019. In Mexico the series premiered on Las Estrellas on 5 November 2018, and ended on 3 March 2019.

== Plot ==
The series is a complex story of destinies that intersect when a media mogul, Leon Carvajal, is stabbed on his wedding day, at the same time that an assassin, Macario "El Chino" Valdez, is executed in the electric chair. Leon is reincarnated in the body of El Chino Valdez and, in turn, El Chino's soul ends up in the body of a professor of anthropology, Beltran Camacho, who dies in a car accident. Now, each man will not only have to deal with a new body, but also adapt to a new soul.

Leon now in the body of El Chino leaves El Chino's family and immigrates to Mexico. Leon gets a new identity, Jacobo Reyes, and he begins to work as a driver in his home with the help of his best friend, Camilo. Leon/Jacobo is now trying to figure out who was responsible for his death, he also finds out his new young wife, Lucia, betrayed him with his most loyal friend, Johnny. His kids have problems of their own; his oldest daughter Eva is involved with a Drug Cartel, his son Guille does not want to work in his media company, and his youngest daughter Valentina is discovering her sexuality. He will take this second chance to fix the problems he never knew of. Starting by making Lucia fall in love with him so he could find out the truth about his death.

After his soul transfers into Beltran's body, El Chino gets the chance to build a family and take on the roles of a husband and father. He also uses the new body to try to bring down the cartel he once worked for. Bárbara, a fortune teller who gains the ability to speak to the dead, helps him.

Trying to figure out why they are back in different bodies is not the only problem. Leon/Jacobo will have to avoid being discovered as El Chino Valdez by the police and the drug cartel. Beltran/Chino will have to find his body, Leon/Jacobo, and try to protect his real family from the cartel whom are after him.

They will begin to meet others who are just like them, reincarnated. They must find out their purpose and they will all be connected through a butterfly tattoo that extends and bleeds when they mess up.

== Cast ==
=== Main ===
- Michel Brown as Macario "El Chino" Valdés / León Carvajal / Jacobo Reyes
- Angelique Boyer as Lucía Borges
- Alejandro Nones as Johny Corona
- Arturo Barba as Beltrán Camacho / Macario "El Chino" Valdés
- Macarena Achaga as Valentina Carvajal
- Claudia Martín as Eva Carvajal
- Jessica Más as Lupita de Valdés
- Henry Zakka as Camilo Guerra
- Nestor Rodulfo as El Alacrán
- Gonzalo Peña as Guillermo Carvajal
- Roberto Duarte as Inspector Montilla
- Cinthia Vázquez as Alicia Camacho
- Bárbara López as Juliana Valdés
- Cayetano Arámburo as Mateo Luna
- Jessica Díaz as Renata Barranco
- Alexis Ayala as León Carvajal

=== Recurring ===
- Alessio Valentini as Javier Beltrán
- Nastassja Villasana as La Muerte
- Raquel Garza as Barbara

== Television ratings ==
=== U.S. ratings ===
Viewership and ratings per season of Love to Death
Season	Episodes	First aired		Last aired		Avg. viewers (millions)
Season	Episodes	Date	Viewers (millions)	Date	Viewers (millions)	Avg. viewers (millions)
1	87	29 October 2018	1.54	11 March 2019	2.03	1.39

=== Mexico ratings ===
Viewership and ratings per season of Love to Death
Season	Episodes	First aired		Last aired		Avg. viewers (millions)
Season	Episodes	Date	Viewers (millions)	Date	Viewers (millions)	Avg. viewers (millions)
1	76 (Note: Should reflect the number of episodes that contribute to the average given in the last column.)	5 November 2018	3.8	3 March 2019	3.3	3.08

== Episodes ==
No.	Title	U.S. air date	Mexico air date	US viewers (millions)	Mexico viewers (millions)
1	"Chapter 1"	29 October 2018	5 November 2018	1.54	3.8
León marries Lucía in a beautiful wedding with their loved ones in attendance. Johny has a secret relationship with Lucia and decides to kill León so he can stay with her. El Chino tells Lupita that he murdered a judge and could be executed in the electric chair. However, death will give León and El Chino a second chance.
2	"Chapter 2"	30 October 2018	6 November 2018	1.50	3.6
León resuscitates in the body of Chino so he is forced to flee from the men of the Alacrán, in the middle of a hurricane. Beltrán dies in an automotive accident, minutes after the soul of El Chino reincarnates in the body of the teacher. Lucía tells an investigator that she knows she is the main suspect in León's death.
3	"Chapter 3"	31 October 2018	7 November 2018	1.32	3.4
León leaves Chino's family and flees to Mexico, after learning that his funeral takes place, observes the suffering of his family. León calls Lucía and tells her that he is alive, but she thinks it is a joke. Lucía is interrogated by a detective about León's death. Lucía arrives at Grupo Carvajal to take the place left by León, but Eva will not allow Lucía to take her father's businesses from the family.
4	"Chapter 4"	1 November 2018	8 November 2018	1.40	3.1
Lucía begins to hallucinate and thinks she sees León telling her that she is a murderer. El Chino is still trying to discover why he is in the body of another man. León looks for an old friend to ask for help and recover his life.
5	"Chapter 5"	2 November 2018	9 November 2018	1.20	3.1
Eva insults Lucía and she slaps her so that she respects her. Johny decides to hire very dangerous people in the company even though León did not trust them.
6	"Chapter 6"	5 November 2018	12 November 2018	1.19	2.7
An investigator interrogates Eva to find out who could have killed León, but she only blames Lucía. Lucía gives an interview to talk about León.
7	"Chapter 7"	7 November 2018	13 November 2018	1.29	2.6
León starts working for Lucía as her new driver. Lucía remembers when León asked her to marry him.
8	"Chapter 8"	8 November 2018	14 November 2018	1.33	2.6
Guillermo tells Johny that he will stay at the company and that he discovered that someone stole money from his father. Eva goes unauthorized to Lucía's room looking for evidence to blame her for León's death.
9	"Chapter 9"	9 November 2018	15 November 2018	1.25	3.0
León finds out that Lucia will meet Johny and offers to take her, but she refuses. Guillermo goes out to take with a friend, but discovers that he is a bad man and takes him to a store to steal money.
10	"Chapter 10"	12 November 2018	16 November 2018	1.36	2.9
León is very upset to discover that Lucía and Johny are lovers. Guillermo can not stop thinking about the man whose partner shot him and goes to look for him at the hospital.
11	"Chapter 11"	13 November 2018	19 November 2018	1.36	3.1
Juliana meets Valentina and both have a good time in the park. León can not hide his annoyance to discover that Lucía has always deceived him.
12	"Chapter 12"	14 November 2018	20 November 2018	1.31	2.9
Chino is determined to travel to Texas to find the money he buried and help Alicia and her son. Camilo finds a woman with the butterfly tattoo, but when he is about to approach her she flees.
13	"Chapter 13"	16 November 2018	21 November 2018	1.22	3.2
Lucía asks Jacobo to go back to work at home and he accepts. Renata accompanies Guillermo to visit the man from the liquor store. Alacrán's men kidnap Eva and take her with him.
14	"Chapter 14"	19 November 2018	22 November 2018	1.29	3.1
El Chino decides to go with a sorcerer to investigate why he was reborn. El Alacrán demands his men not to approach Eva's newspaper.
15	"Chapter 15"	20 November 2018	23 November 2018	1.30	2.9
Valentina gets drunk and almost drowned, but León saves her. Teresa confronts Mateo because she believes that because of him her husband was murdered.
16	"Chapter 16"	21 November 2018	26 November 2018	1.20	3.0
Alicia feels very bad because the man who is with her is no longer the same. Karla decides to look for Camilo to help her recover her normal life.
17	"Chapter 17"	23 November 2018	27 November 2018	1.19	3.2
Guillermo learns that the man his partner attacked survived the operation, but will not be able to walk again. Johny asks one of Eva's employees to stop supporting her, as he plans to have more control of the company.
18	"Chapter 18"	26 November 2018	28 November 2018	1.41	2.8
El Chino accepts the sorcerer's help and meets the man he killed. Silvina tells Jacobo that he reminds her of León, because he acts like him.
19	"Chapter 19"	27 November 2018	29 November 2018	1.48	3.0
El Chino can not stop thinking about all the people he murdered and starts to have visions. León and Lucía are ambushed by a group of armed men.
20	"Chapter 20"	28 November 2018	30 November 2018	1.46	2.8
Jacobo and Lucía are kidnapped by armed men. Johny becomes nervous when he realizes that the investigator is getting closer and closer to finding León's real murderer.
21	"Chapter 21"	29 November 2018	3 December 2018	1.26	3.2
Eva and Johny do not know what to do to rescue Lucía from the kidnappers. The police track the signal of Lucía's and Jacobo's cell phones to find them.
22	"Chapter 22"	30 November 2018	4 December 2018	1.25	3.0
Valentina is nervous to think that Lucía could be dead. Johny begins to suspect that Jacobo could have something to do with Lucía's kidnapping and asks Camilo where he is from.
23	"Chapter 23"	3 December 2018	5 December 2018	1.40	2.6
Lucía and Jacobo beat up one of their guards and manage to escape. Karla goes to a bar and meets her old husband, she gets very nervous and decides to leave. Lucia and Jacobo kiss for the first time in a river.
24	"Chapter 24"	4 December 2018	6 December 2018	1.31	2.5
Alicia forces Beltrán to go to couple's therapy and he confesses that he is not the man she believes. Johny suspects that Lucía had something to do with Jacobo.
25	"Chapter 25"	5 December 2018	7 December 2018	1.31	2.6
The inspector arrests Jacobo as a suspect in Lucia's kidnapping, but she, Camilo and Mateo defend him. Karla gets a gun and uses it to recover the money that was stolen from her at the casino.
26	"Chapter 26"	7 December 2018	10 December 2018	1.14	3.0
Guillermo kisses Renata at a party. Guillermo arrives drunk at his house and Valentina helps him get to his room. Beltrán is determined to recover the money he stole to help Javier.
27	"Chapter 27"	10 December 2018	11 December 2018	1.28	3.1
Lucía decides to meet Servando Armenta in a library. Beltrán tells Barbara that they will travel to recover the money he buried in his past life.
28	"Chapter 28"	11 December 2018	12 December 2018	1.37	2.7
Renata is about to confess to Guillermo what happened at the party, but Eva interrupts them. The casino men enter Karla's house and beat her father as revenge for the money she stole.
29	"Chapter 29"	12 December 2018	13 December 2018	1.18	2.6
Armenta says in the interview that he will respect all the journalists of the country. Karla asks Camilo to give her family the money he stole from the casino.
30	"Chapter 30"	14 December 2018	14 December 2018	1.24	2.8
Renata feels very sad to think that Guillermo might be interested in another woman. Jacobo discovers that there are a couple of men looking for him and he turns on an alarm in the building to escape.
31	"Chapter 31"	17 December 2018	17 December 2018	1.29	3.0
Monilla tells Lucía that they suspect that Jacobo could be León's killer. Jacobo tells Karla that he will accompany her to the casino to take revenge on the people who beat Pedro.
32	"Chapter 32"	18 December 2018	18 December 2018	1.29	3.0
Johny goes to look for Lucía at home and almost sees her with Jacobo. Karla goes to the casino determined to earn the money she needs. Lucía can not stop thinking about Jacobo and the moments she has spent with him.
33	"Chapter 33"	19 December 2018	19 December 2018	1.28	TBA
Alacrán's men see Barbara and Beltrán in the Chino's house and spy on them to find out if they can obtain information about him. The casino men decide to torture Karla before killing her, but Camilo manages to save her.
34	"Chapter 34"	20 December 2018	20 December 2018	1.22	3.1
Jacobo tells Lucia that he knows he was cheating on León with Johny. Camilo tells Jacobo that Karla died in a fire, like the first time.
35	"Chapter 35"	21 December 2018	21 December 2018	1.19	TBA
Eva gets upset when she arrives at her siblings house and discovers that they have a party for Guillermo's birthday. Mayela confesses to Guillermo that she is in love with him and kisses him, Renata sees them and becomes sad.
36	"Chapter 36"	25 December 2018	24 December 2018	1.11	TBA
Guillermo tells Jacobo that Toño shot a man in a liquor store. Jacobo learns that Valentina uses drugs. Jacobo discovers that Valentina's friend is Juliana, El Chino's daughter.
37	"Chapter 37"	26 December 2018	25 December 2018	1.36	TBA
Guillermo tells Renata that he knows he kissed her and confesses that Mayela is not his girlfriend. Alacrán's men kidnap Lupita to help them find Chino.
38	"Chapter 38"	27 December 2018	26 December 2018	1.35	TBA
Lucía attends a dinner with Armenta and he tells her that he knows everything about his past. Guillermo sees an interview of Mayela assuring that they are in a relationship and he gets bothered with her.
39	"Chapter 39"	28 December 2018	27 December 2018	1.39	TBA
Jacobo discovers that El Alacran kidnapped Chino's wife and is determined to help her. Johny proposes to Lucía to confess that they have a relationship, but she refuses.
40	"Chapter 40"	1 January 2019	28 December 2018	1.49	TBA
Lucía and Johny receive a package in León's name and they get very nervous. Mayela asks Renata to help her conquer Guillermo.
41	"Chapter 41"	2 January 2019	31 December 2018	1.50	TBA
Beltrán tells Barbara that he has to kill Alacrán or he will kill Lupita. Renata decides to resign because she can no longer support the relationship with Guillermo. Bárbara and Beltrán find a man who, like him, is a reborn man.
42	"Chapter 42"	3 January 2019	1 January 2019	1.47	TBA
Valentina teaches Juliana how to swim and kisses her in the pool. Guillermo goes to look for Renata at her home to talk about her resignation and asks her to return to work with him.
43	"Chapter 43"	4 January 2019	2 January 2019	1.42	TBA
Juliana finds out that her mother is badly injured at the hospital and goes to look for her. Camilo and Jacobo meet a woman who says that in her past life she was a man.
44	"Chapter 44"	7 January 2019	3 January 2019	1.25	TBA
Alacrán's men kidnap Lupe's friend to tell them where she is. Jacobo sends a compromising photograph to Lucía and Johny in the name of León.
45	"Chapter 45"	8 January 2019	4 January 2019	1.34	2.5
Guillermo tells Renata that he is not interested in Mayela and kisses her. Beltrán and Jacobo help Lupe and save her from the men who want to kill her.
46	"Chapter 46"	9 January 2019	7 January 2019	1.37	2.9
Eva decides to move to Lucía's house while hers is being remodeled, but Lucía is not happy with the news. Valentina and Juliana make the assassins believe that Lupe is dead and they save her life.
47	"Chapter 47"	10 January 2019	8 January 2019	1.46	2.9
Mateo tells Valentina that he will post a note in the newspaper saying that Lupe is dead so that Alacrán’s will no longer look for her. Armenta tells Lucía that he wants to spend the night with her.
48	"Chapter 48"	11 January 2019	9 January 2019	1.32	3.1
Camilo and Jacobo talk to a man who claims to have come back to life several times and they discover important things about the reborn. Mateo is with one of Alacrán's hit men to get information about his frauds.
49	"Chapter 49"	14 January 2019	10 January 2019	1.36	3.2
Johny tells Lucía that he thinks she is interested in Jacobo and that is why she defends him all the time. Mayela goes to look for Guillermo at his office and gets very upset when he realizes that he is not there and nobody knows about him.
50	"Chapter 50"	15 January 2019	11 January 2019	1.38	2.7
Jacobo forces Valentina to leave the hospital when she sees Alacrán’s men, but she gets upset because she wants to help Juliana. Juliana meets Beltrán and thanks him for paying Lupe's hospital bill.
51	"Chapter 51"	16 January 2019	14 January 2019	1.28	2.9
Bárbara tells Beltrán that she will leave her store because she believes there are ghosts. Armenta gives Lucía a beautiful car and Eva thinks she has a new love.
52	"Chapter 52"	17 January 2019	15 January 2019	1.30	3.0
Lucía believes that Eva is the person who leaves messages in the name of León. Renata tells her friend that she is dating Guillermo.
53	"Chapter 53"	18 January 2019	16 January 2019	1.45	3.2
Eva finds León's secret hiding place and is determined to do whatever it takes to enter. Jacobo tells Camilo that Valentina kissed Juliana. Guillermo confesses to Valentina that he is in love with Renata.
54	"Chapter 54"	21 January 2019	17 January 2019	1.43	3.1
Valentina confesses to Guillermo that she is in love with Juliana and is worried about what people think. Montilla tells Johny that he believes that the person who ordered León to be killed works for the company.
55	"Chapter 55"	22 January 2019	18 January 2019	1.48	3.0
Guillermo complains to Mayela for telling Eva that he has a relationship with Renata. Jacobo discovers that Lucía and Johny are responsible for León's death.
56	"Chapter 56"	23 January 2019	21 January 2019	1.46	2.8
Guillermo goes to look for Renata at her house, but she refuses to open the door. Lucho sees Jacobo hugging Valentina and thinks she's dating him.
57	"Chapter 57"	24 January 2019	22 January 2019	1.41	3.3
Guillermo tells Eva that he will leave the company if Renata does not return to work with him. One of Alacrán’s men tells Mateo that they work with León Carvajal's company.
58	"Chapter 58"	25 January 2019	23 January 2019	1.47	3.2
Eva manages to open León's secret hiding place and Lucía gets upset when she learns that they entered without her. Lucho follows Valentina everywhere and sees her kissing Juliana. Eva tells El Alacrán that he has a traitor in his organization.
59	"Chapter 59"	28 January 2019	24 January 2019	1.43	3.4
El Alacrán is determined to get rid of Mateo if he keeps investigating his business. Johny discovers that Jacobo and Lucía are lovers.
60	"Chapter 60"	29 January 2019	25 January 2019	1.59	2.8
Guillermo tells Valentina that he will leave the house because of Eva, she tries to convince him to stay, but he refuses. Lucía tells Jacobo that Johny knows they have a relationship and asks him to leave the house so that he does not hurt him.
61	"Chapter 61"	30 January 2019	28 January 2019	1.44	3.1
Johny goes to look for Jacobo at Camilo's house and demands that he leave the country. Guillermo moves to Renata's house, but things do not go as he expects.
62	"Chapter 62"	31 January 2019	29 January 2019	1.39	3.1
Johny follows Jacobo and discovers that he has a family. Silvina tells Lucía that she thinks Jacobo has something to do with León's death, but she does not believe her.
63	"Chapter 63"	1 February 2019	30 January 2019	1.38	3.4
Johny tells Lucía that Jacobo has a family and shows her the photos to prove it. Eva demands Juliana to get away from Valentina and forbids her from entering any of her properties.
64	"Chapter 64"	4 February 2019	31 January 2019	1.33	3.4
Armenta and his men kidnap Valentina to threaten Lucía and forcibly enter her house. Guillermo and Renata begin to have many problems living together, since he is used to another lifestyle.
65	"Chapter 65"	6 February 2019	1 February 2019	1.57	2.9
Eva asks Alacrán to guarantee Valentina's safety, but he refuses. The police arrive at the Carvajal mansion to save Lucía and Valentina. Jacobo kills Armenta before he hurts Valentina.
66	"Chapter 66"	7 February 2019	4 February 2019	1.54	3.2
Lupita tells Juliana that the person that is in El Chino's body is not her dad and she looks for him to know the truth. Johny prevents Lucía from discovering which hospital Jacobo is in. Valentina is emotionally affected by Armenta's attack.
67	"Chapter 67"	8 February 2019	5 February 2019	1.60	3.3
Jacobo's face is exposed on television and both Beltrán and El Alacrán identify him as El Chino. Camilo offers Valentina his help to overcome her trauma. Fabián decides to face El Chino by himself and heads to the hospital.
68	"Chapter 68"	11 February 2019	6 February 2019	1.61	3.2
Valentina and Juliana interrogate Camilo about his relationship with Jacobo, since they know he is a hit man. Fabián tries to assassinate Jacobo, but Beltrán defends him.
69	"Chapter 69"	12 February 2019	7 February 2019	1.48	3.2
Lupita sees Juliana kissing Valentina and gets upset, because she refuses to believe that her daughter is in love with a woman. Mateo hits Johny and blames him for Susana's death.
70	"Chapter 70"	13 February 2019	8 February 2019	1.36	3.1
Eva blames Lucía for the death of her father and all the misfortunes that her family suffers, requires her to leave the house, but she refuses. The police arrest Guillermo for the assault at the liquor store.
71	"Chapter 71"	14 February 2019	11 February 2019	1.51	3.0
Lucía confesses to Silvina that she is in love with Jacobo, but she will do anything to send him to prison. Jacobo and Barbara dig up León’s coffin and discover that it is empty.
72	"Chapter 72"	15 February 2019	12 February 2019	1.49	3.5
Eva discovers that she is pregnant and does not know who the father of the baby is. Camilo tells Montilla the whole truth about Jacobo, but he does not believe him. El Alacrán kidnaps Eva outside the police offices.
73	"Chapter 73"	18 February 2019	13 February 2019	1.53	3.5
Lucía discovers that Jacobo sent the anonymous letters attacking her and Johny. Lucho discovers that Sergio was intimate with Juliana, he asks him not to tell anyone.
74	"Chapter 74"	19 February 2019	14 February 2019	1.54	3.3
Eva confesses to El Alacrán that she does not want to have children, but he threatens her and tells her that he wants to be the official father of the baby. Jacobo discovers that Beltrán plans to deliver him to El Alacrán to save Juliana.
75	"Chapter 75"	20 February 2019	15 February 2019	1.40	3.4
Sergio looks for Valentina to inform her that Juliana was kidnapped even though she does not want to know anything about him. Alicia goes to find a woman who claims to be transmigrated and thus investigate the situation that Beltrán is living.
76	"Chapter 76"	22 February 2019	18 February 2019	1.41	3.2
Jacobo and Beltrán are determined to save Juliana and make a plan to deceive El Alacrán. Lucho tries to defend Lupita and Valentina from the Alacrán's men and they assassinate him.
77	"Chapter 77"	25 February 2019	19 February 2019	1.43	3.2
Mateo confesses to Camilo that Eva is laundering money with drug dealers. Valentina tells Guillermo that she feels guilty for Lucho’s death, because she asked him to go find Juliana.
78	"Chapter 78"	26 February 2019	20 February 2019	1.39	3.4
Eva goes to look for El Alacrán in his hiding place, Mateo follows her and discovers that he is her lover. Renata sees Guillermo kissing Mayela and decides to leave the mansion, but he tries to make her change her mind.
79	"Chapter 79"	27 February 2019	21 February 2019	1.40	3.3
In his desperate effort to try to correct Eva's mistake, since the company would be exposed, Jacobo reveals to Mateo that he is León Carvajal. Mateo full of anger and pain, wants Eva to sink. Candela tells Lucía that she has cancer to prevent from making her leave her home.
80	"Chapter 80"	28 February 2019	22 February 2019	1.51	3.2
After listening to Lucía's voice message, Jacobo awaits her decision. Guille and Renata visit the Castillo's, there they realize that they already knew that Guille was one of the assailants, but they expected him to confess. Fabricio is about to kill Jacobo, but Lucía defends him. Beltrán tries to abuse Lupita and Juliana hits him with a bottle.
81	"Chapter 81"	1 March 2019	25 February 2019	1.43	3.0
Eva apologizes to Mateo, but he is determined to report her. Lucía tells Johny that Jacobo knows that they are responsible for the murder of León Carvajal.
82	"Chapter 82"	4 March 2019	26 February 2019	1.51	3.3
Eva discovers that Emiliano ordered Mateo to be killed. Jacobo confesses to Guillermo that he is León Carvajal.
83	"Chapter 83"	5 March 2019	27 February 2019	1.47	3.3
Eva asks El Alacrán not to kill Mateo, but he is determined to get rid of him. Jacobo talks to Guillermo to make him understand that he is León Carvajal. Candela confesses to Lucía that she is not sick.
84	"Chapter 84"	6 March 2019	28 February 2019	1.52	3.5
Johny asks Eva to leave the company when he finds out that she is involved with drug traffickers. Guillermo tells Renata that Jacobo is León Carvajal.
85	"Chapter 85"	7 March 2019	1 March 2019	1.47	3.6
Jacobo looks for Eva and Valentina and confesses that he is León, but they do not believe him. Mateo informs Montilla that El Alacrán's men follow him, but they manage to catch him before he can help him.
86	"Chapter 86"	8 March 2019	3 March 2019	1.49	3.3
87	"Chapter 87"	11 March 2019	3 March 2019	2.03	3.3
El Alacrán tells Mateo that if he does not withdraw the accusation against Eva, he will kill her. Montilla discovers that Susana's killer is Johny and goes to look for him at his house. Johny goes to look for Lucía at León’s house, but she tells him that she will not escape with him. Valentina comes out and confesses her love for Juliana in a live TV interview. Eva discovers that Lucía is responsible for León’s death. Beltrán confesses to Lupita and Alicia that he is in love with both of them.

=== Special ===
No.	Title	Original release date	Viewers (millions)
1	"Amar a muerte El Especial"	17 November 2018	0.57
Compilation of the best moments of the series.

== Juliantina ==
After the success of the lesbian couple of the series composed of Macarena Achaga and Bárbara López, in November 2019 Televisa confirmed that on 8 November 2019 a special edition entitled Juliantina would be released through its website, which It is composed of 19 episodes, and is remastered with the best telenovela scenes.

=== Episodes ===
No.	Title	Original release date	Length (minutes)
1	"Dos años atrás"	8 November 2019	37:09
2	"¡Todos los hombres son de flojera!"	8 November 2019	34:59
3	"Cita imperfecta"	8 November 2019	38:05
4	"Nunca he estado enamorada"	8 November 2019	35:38
5	"Aprendiendo a bailar"	8 November 2019	37:48
6	"La fiesta"	8 November 2019	34:27
7	"Nadie me va a alejar de ti"	8 November 2019	39:07
8	"¡El primer beso!"	8 November 2019	36:37
9	"Me encantas"	8 November 2019	36:58
10	"Todo es mejor desde que tú estás en mi vida"	8 November 2019	41:01
11	"Estoy enamorada de una chica"	8 November 2019	36:39
12	"El pacto de Juliantina"	8 November 2019	37:07
13	"El secuestro"	8 November 2019	39:27
14	"Mi príncipe azul"	8 November 2019	40:09
15	"Traicioné a Valentina"	8 November 2019	41:32
16	"¿Juliana estás bien?"	8 November 2019	40:00
17	"Voy a estar aquí para lo que necesites"	8 November 2019	38:41
18	"Apoyar a la familia"	8 November 2019	37:28
19	"Capítulo final: Estábamos destinada a conocernos"	8 November 2019	25:45

=== Future ===
On 20 December 2019, producer Billy Rovzar and Carlos Bardasano confirmed that a film based on the two characters of Bárbara López and Macarena Achaga for Videocine would be made. It was also confirmed that a series based on the two characters written by Leonardo Padrón, possibly entitled Las Juliantinas, was being written.

== Awards and nominations ==
Year	Award	Category	Nominated	Result
2019	TVyNovelas Awards	Best Telenovela of the Year	Carlos Bardasano	Won
2019	TVyNovelas Awards	Best Actress	Angelique Boyer	Won
2019	TVyNovelas Awards	Best Actor	Michel Brown	Won
2019	TVyNovelas Awards	Best Antagonist Actress	Claudia Martín	Won
2019	TVyNovelas Awards	Best Antagonist Actor	Alejandro Nones	Won
2019	TVyNovelas Awards	Best Leading Actress	Raquel Garza	Won
2019	TVyNovelas Awards	Best Leading Actor	Alexis Ayala	Won
2019	TVyNovelas Awards	Best Co-lead Actress	Macarena Achaga	Won
2019	TVyNovelas Awards	Best Co-lead Actor	Arturo Barba	Won
2019	TVyNovelas Awards	Best Young Lead Actress	Bárbara López	Won
2019	TVyNovelas Awards	Best Young Lead Actor	Gonzalo Peña	Nominated
2019	TVyNovelas Awards	Best Original Story or Adaptation	Leonardo Padrón	Won
2019	TVyNovelas Awards	Best Direction	Alejandro Lozano, Carlos Cock, and Rolando Ocampo	Won
2019	TVyNovelas Awards	Best Musical Theme	"Me muero" (Carlos Rivera)	Won
2019	TVyNovelas Awards	Best Cast	Amar a muerte	Won
2019	Eres Awards	Best Actress	Bárbara López	Nominated
2019	Eres Awards	Best Actress	Claudia Martín	Nominated
2019	Eres Awards	Best Actress	Macarena Achaga	Nominated
2019	Eres Awards	Best Actor	Michel Brown	Nominated
2019	Eres Awards	Best Kiss	Angelique Boyer and Michel Brown	Nominated
2019	Eres Awards	Best Kiss	Bárbara López and Macarena Achaga	Nominated
2020	GLAAD Media Award	Outstanding Scripted Television Series (Spanish-Language)	Amar a muerte	Nominated
