= Carmen Delgado =

Mexican actress

- Born: Mexico City
- Occupation: Actress

Carmen Delgado is a Mexican actress. She studied acting at Centro Universitario de Teatro.

== Trajectory ==
- 2021 Madre sólo hay dos ... Laura Villa
- 2015 Así en el barrio como en el cielo ... La pechu
- 2013 Vivir a Destiempo ... Chole
- 2012 Amor Cautivo ...
- 2012 A Corazón Abierto ...
- 2011 Emperatriz ...Graciela "Gata" Mendoza
- 2009 Vuélveme A Querer ... Rosa María
- 2008 Pobre Rico Pobre ... Lucero
- 2007 Bellezas Indomables ... Carmen
- 2007 Lo que se hereda no se hurta
- 2006 Montecristo ... Helena
- 2004 Belinda... Gardenia (2004)
- 2003 Desde Gayola... La Chata
- 2002 Súbete A Mi Moto ... Carmen
- 2001 Cuando Seas Mía ... Constanza de Sandoval
- 2001 Honey for Oshun
- 2001 Lo que callamos las mujeres – Hasta que la muerte nos separe (2001) … Olga
- 2000 En el país de no pasa nada ... Yadir
- 2000 El tío Alberto ... Vanessa
- 2000 His Most Serene Highness
- 1999 Háblame de amor … Esther
- 1998 Demasiado corazón
- 1998 Yacaranday ... Cecilia
- 1998 La casa del naranjo ... Fidela
- 1997 Para morir en video (short)
- 1996 A flor de piel ... Silvia (1996)
- 1996 Cuentos para solitarios – Para morir en video
- 1992 Makinavaja - 'El último choriso'
- 1988 El tiempo de los dioses
- 1987 La indomable... Cristina
- 1987 El cristal empañado ... Marisela
- 1986 Ave Fénix ... Irma
- 1984 Aprendiendo a vivir ... Raquel
- 1983 Asalto al Banco Central
- 1983 Un solo corazón ... Catalina
- 1980 No temas al amor ... Marcela
- 1980 Caminemos
