= Part of Me (TV series) =

American television soap opera

- Genre: Telenovela
- Created by: Laura Sosa
- Based on: En cuerpo ajeno by Julio Jiménez
- Written by: Magda Crisantes; Felipe Espinet; Luis Miguel Martínez; Laura Sosa
- Screenplay by: Laura Sosa; Eduardo Macías
- Directed by: Luis Manzo; Ricardo Schwarz
- Creative director: Valeria Fiñana
- Starring: María Elisa Camargo; Jorge Luis Pila; David Chocarro; Vanessa Villela; Laura Flores
- Music by: Marco Flores
- Opening theme: "En otra piel" by Laura Flores
- Country of origin: United States
- Original language: Spanish
- No. of seasons: 1
- No. of episodes: 154

Production
- Executive producer: Jose Gerardo Guillén
- Producer: Gemma Lombardi
- Cinematography: Joseph Martínez; Argemiro Saavedra
- Editors: Ellery Albarrán; Francisco Nogueras
- Camera setup: Multi-camera
- Production company: Telemundo Studios

Original release
- Network: Telemundo
- Release: February 18 – September 29, 2014

Related
- El cuerpo del deseo (2005); Love to Death (2018)

Part of Me (Spanish: En otra piel) is a Spanish-language telenovela produced by United States and Mexico-based television network Telemundo Studios, Miami. It is based on the 2005 Telemundo telenovela El Cuerpo del Deseo, which in turn is based on the 1992 RTI Colombia telenovela En Cuerpo Ajeno. María Elisa Camargo and David Chocarro stars as the main protagonists, while Vanessa Villela and Jorge Luis Pila stars as the main antagonists, with the special participation of Laura Flores.

En otra piel marks the debut of Flores with Telemundo, and the return of Camargo from Flor Salvaje and Villela from Una Maid en Manhattan. Also part of the cast are Pila and Chocarro after their respective hit telenovelas (La Patrona and El Rostro de la Venganza.)

== Background ==
The telenovela, based on the story El cuerpo del deseo by Julio Jiménez, was adapted for Telemundo by Laura Sousa and Eduardo Macías. It started life with the name "Almas pérdidas", but was later renamed "En otra piel".

== Plot ==
Two women share a tragic and supernatural destiny that binds them together even after death. Monica Serrano (Laura Flores), a world-renowned pianist with an impressive fortune, dies after the betrayal of her ambitious niece and the man she loves. But by way of a mysterious talisman, Monica's soul, which does not accept departing from this world, occupies the body of Adriana Aguilar (María Elisa Camargo), a modest waitress that dies at the hands of a dangerous gangster. Now, in Adriana's body, Monica's soul will do the impossible to defend her children and seek justice while Adriana's soul wanders this world. Motivated by love, Adriana decides to recover her body, but Monica will resist this until her mission has been completed. She wants to take revenge.

== Cast ==
=== Main ===
- María Elisa Camargo as Adriana Águilar / Mónica Serrano / Mónica Arriaga
- Jorge Luis Pila as Gerardo Fonsi
- David Chocarro as Diego Ochoa
- Vanessa Villela as Elena Serrano
- Laura Flores as Mónica Serrano
- Plutarco Haza as Carlos Ricalde / Raúl Camacho
- Maricella González as Selma Carrasco
- Guillermo Quintanilla as Rodrigo Cantú
- Gloria Peralta as Marta Suárez
- Javier Gómez as Julián Larrea / Jorge Larrea
- Karen Senties as Lorena Serrano
- Beatriz Monroy as Victoria "Vicky" Andrade
- Eduardo Ibarrola as Judge Manuel Figueroa
- Kendra Santacruz as Camila Serrano
- Martín Barba as Ricardo Cantú
- Omar Germenos as Esteban Lazo
- Silvana Arias as Maite Carvajal
- Adrián Carvajal as Ernesto Fonsi / Ernesto Suárez
- Alexandra Pomales as Valeria Martínez
- Alba Raquel Barros as Guadalupe Cortes "Doña Lupe"
- Jonathan Freudman as Gabriel Cantú
- Óscar Priego as Jacinto Aguilar
- María Elena Dávila as Jennifer
- Juanita Arias as Eileen Parker
- Daniela Macías as Susana
- Gala Montes as Emiliana Larrea Serrano

=== Recurring ===
- Rubén Morales as Don Mario "El Corleone"
- Gustavo Pedraza as Jaime González "Rottweiler"
- Yamil Sesin as Fulgencio Soto "El Pachuco"
- Juan Jiménez as Anselmo

== Soundtrack ==
Track	Song	Singer(s)	Written by	References
1	"En otra piel"	Laura Flores	Marco Flores	—N/a
2	"Para olvidarte"	Ender Thomas	Ender Thomas	—N/a
3	"Descubriendo el amor"	María Elena Dávila	—N/a	
4	"El arte de Gabriel" (Short version)	María Elena Dávila	—N/a	—N/a

== United States broadcast ==
Season	Timeslot (ET/PT)	No. of episodes	Premiered		Ended	
Season	Timeslot (ET/PT)	No. of episodes	Date	Premiere viewers (in millions)	Date	Finale viewers (in millions)
2014	Monday to Friday 9 pm/8c	154	February 18, 2014	1.153	September 29, 2014	—N/a

== Awards and nominations ==
Year	Award	Category	Nominated	Result
2014	Premios Tu Mundo			
2014	Premios Tu Mundo	Novela of the Year	En otra piel	Nominated
2014	Premios Tu Mundo	Favorite Lead Actress	María Elisa Camargo	Nominated
2014	Premios Tu Mundo	Favorite Lead Actor	David Chocarro	Nominated
2014	Premios Tu Mundo	Favorite Lead Actor	Jorge Luis Pila	Nominated
2014	Premios Tu Mundo	Best Supporting Actress	Silvana Arias	Nominated
2014	Premios Tu Mundo	Best Supporting Actress	Maricela González	Nominated
2014	Premios Tu Mundo	First Actor	Guillermo Quintanilla	Nominated
2014	Premios Tu Mundo	First Actor	Javier Gómez	Nominated
2014	Premios Tu Mundo	Junior Favorite Artist	Kendra Santacruz	Nominated
2014	Premios Tu Mundo	Junior Favorite Artist	Gala Montes	Nominated
2015	Miami Life Awards			
2015	Miami Life Awards	Best Young Actor in a Telenovela	Jonathan Freudman	Nominated
2015	Miami Life Awards	Best Female Villain in a Telenovela	Vanessa Villela	Nominated
2015	Miami Life Awards	Best First Actor in a Telenovela	Gillermo Quintanilla	Nominated
2015	Miami Life Awards	Best Female Lead in a Telenovela	María Elisa Camargo	Nominated
2015	Miami Life Awards	Best Telenovela	En otra piel	Nominated

== See also ==
- List of Telemundo telenovelas
