= Kendra Santacruz =

Mexican television actress

- Born: July 24, 1989 (age 36); Cuernavaca, Morelos, Mexico
- Occupation: Actress
- Years active: 2004-present

Kendra Santacruz (born July 24, 1989, in Cuernavaca, Morelos, Mexico), is a Mexican television actress.

== Filmography ==
Film roles
Year	Title	Roles	Notes
2006	La invención de Morel	Neri	Short film
2011	La última muerte	Mónica Wilkins	
2012	Viaje de generación	Camila	

Television roles
Year	Title	Roles	Notes
2004	Corazones al límite	Daniela	
2005	Contra viento y marea	Amanecer	
2005	La esposa virgen	Marisol Cruz de la Fuente	
2007–2008	Palabra de mujer	Clara Medina	
2009–2010	Atrévete a soñar	Kimberly	
2011–2013	Como dice el dicho	Rosalba Marta	Episode: "Caras vemos" Episodes: " A la guerra sin fusil" and "A la guerra sin fusil: Part 2"
2012	Último año	Celeste Roy	Main role; 68 episodes
2013	Dama y obrero	Isabel García	
2014	En otra piel	Camila Larrea	Series regular; 152 episodes
2015–2016	Bajo el mismo cielo	Greicy Cordero	Series regular; 114 episodes
2019	Decisiones: Unos ganan, otros pierden	Grace	Episode: "El Cazador"

== Awards and nominations ==
Year	Award	Category	Works	Result
2014	Premios Tu Mundo	Junior Favorite Artist	En otra piel	Nominated
