= En cuerpo ajeno =

- Genre: Telenovela
- Created by: Julio Jimenez
- Developed by: RTI Colombia
- Written by: Julio Jiménez
- Directed by: Darío Vargas Linares
- Starring: Amparo Grisales; Danilo Santos; Armando Gutiérrez; Julio Medina
- Composer: Germán Arrieta
- Country of origin: Colombia
- Original language: Spanish
- No. of episodes: 244

Production
- Executive producer: Hugo León Ferrer

Original release
- Network: Channel 1 (Colombia) Cadena Uno
- Release: January 2, 1992 – February 25, 1993

Related
- El cuerpo del deseo; En otra piel; Love to Death

En cuerpo ajeno (literally, "In a borrowed body") is a 1992 Spanish-language telenovela from original idea written by Julio Jiménez, produced by RTI Producciones (Formerly RTI Television), filmed in Colombia.

== Plot ==
Pedro José Donoso (Julio Medina), an older wealthy and widowed businessman marries his assistant even at the risk of straining his relationship with his daughter and being judged by society. After the marriage Donoso starts experiencing agitated strange nightmares with recurrent scenes of peasant and country life and a woman calling "Salvador" in the distance.

Meanwhile his new wife, Isabel Arroyo (Amparo Grisales) plots to poison him and inherit. Aided by her lover, company executive and Donoso´s protégée, Andres Coronado (Armando Gutierrez) with whom she plans to remarry.

Donoso has an argument with his daughter, which is used by Isabel to poison him. He retires to his study with pain in his chest where he plays his piano and dies. Simultaneously, the mysterious peasant suffers a stroke and in the middle of the procession of his funeral awakens. Donoso had reincarnated in the young and handsome peasant to discover he was murdered.

Donoso, now Salvador Cerinza (Danilo Santos), escapes the village to avenge his death and treason and becomes chauffeur to Isabel. Once in the manor he enters the sealed study through a secret passage and starts playing the same melody as when he died to torment his murderer.

Salvador uses his closeness and manipulates inside knowledge to enamour Isabel. A tormentous love affair ensues. Salvador regains control of his wealth and remarries Isabel to later reveal to his daughter that she was not the cause of his stroke and reveal his true murderers and die.

== Cast ==
- Amparo Grisales as Isabel Arroyo de Donoso / de Coronado / de Cerinza
- Armando Gutiérrez as Andrés Coronado
- Danilo Santos as Salvador Cerinza / Pedro José Donoso
  - Julio Medina as Pedro José Donoso
- Maribel Abello as Abigaíl Domínguez
- Ramiro Meneses as Simón Domínguez
- Alvaro Bayona as Walter Franco
- Érika Shütz as Ángela Donoso
- Carlos Congote as Antonio Domínguez
- Liesel Potdevin as Valeria
- Lucy Martínez as Gaetana Charrie
- Julio Pachón as Jardinero
- Constanza Gutiérrez as Cantalicia Muñetón
- Samara de Córdova as Rebeca Macedo
- María Eugenia Arboleda as Lupe
- Rosalba Goenaga
- Iris Oyola
- Delfina Guido
- Stella Rivero
- John Alex Toro
- José Rojas
- Marcela Carvajal

== See also ==
- El Cuerpo del Deseo
