= Jorge Luis Pila =

Czech actor (born 1972)

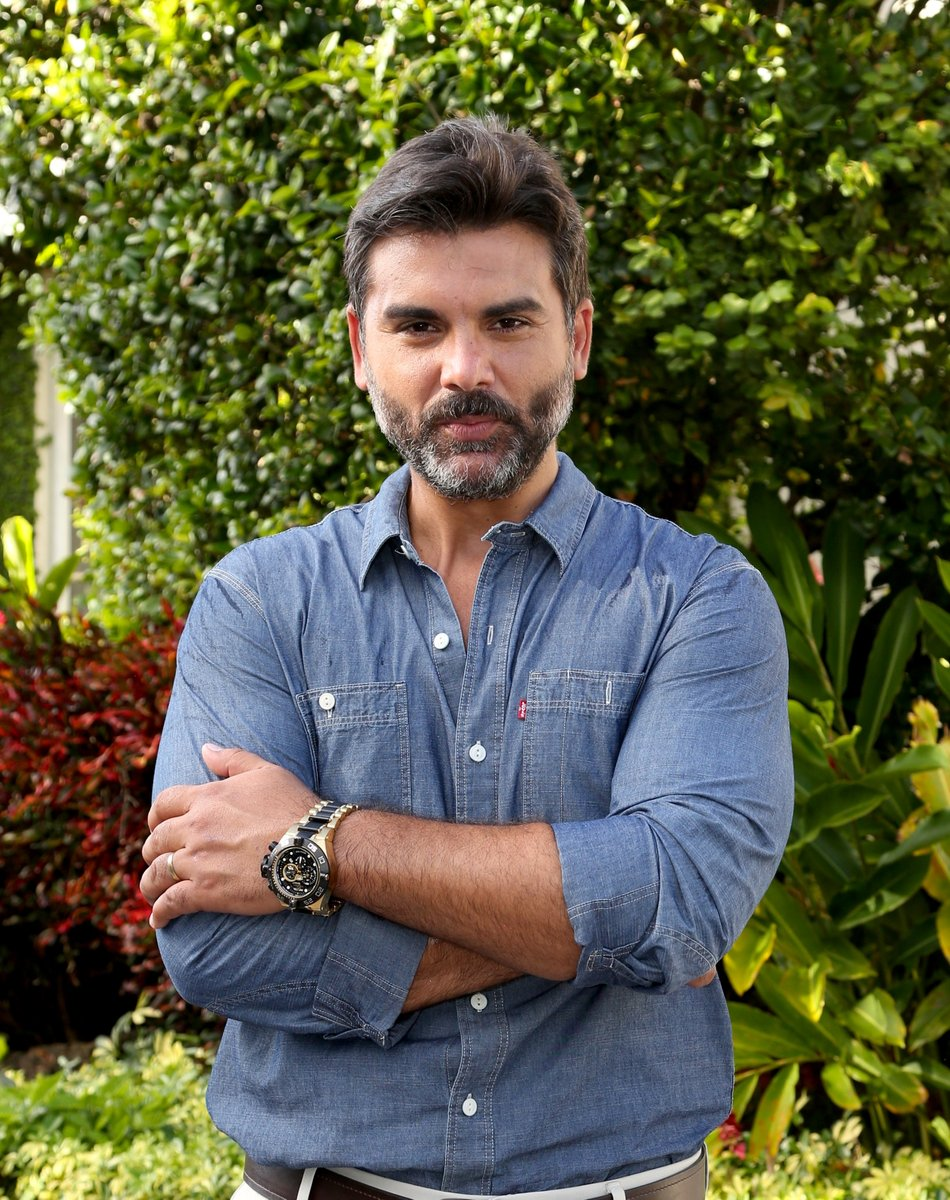
- Born: August 3, 1972 (age 53); Czechoslovakia
- Occupation: Actor
- Years active: 1997–present
- Children: 1

Jorge Luis Pila (born August 3, 1972) is a Czech-born Cuban actor, known for acting in Telenovelas like La Patrona (2013), Yacaranday (1999). His debut was in Al norte del corazón (1997). His mother is from Czech Republic and his father is from Cuba.

He is known for acting in telenovelas such as Al norte del corazón, Secreto de amor, Súbete a mi moto, Más sabe el diablo, Aurora, Acorralada, ¿Dónde está Elisa?, Corazón valiente, La patrona, En otra piel, Eva la Trailera.

== Early life ==
He began his career modeling in Cuba. Later, he moved to Mexico, where he continued modeling and then became a dancer accompanying Mexican singer Yuri on her concert tours for over two years.

Pila subsequently enrolled in the Centro de Educación en las Artes (CEA), Mexico's premier performing arts educational institution, operated by the country's major media conglomerate, Televisa.

== Filmography ==
Television performance
Year	Title	Roles	Notes
1997	Al norte del corazón	José Francisco	
1999	Catalina y Sebastián	Antonio	
1999	Yacaranday	Adrián	
2000	Ellas, inocentes o culpables	Luis	
2001–2002	Secreto de amor	Lisandro Serrano Zulbarán	
2002	Súbete a mi moto	Carlos	
2003	Rebeca	Nicolás Izaguirre	
2004	Ángel rebelde	José Armando Santibáñez	
2005	Soñar no Cuesta Nada	Ernesto	
2006	Mi vida eres tú	Carlos "Charlie"	
2006–2007	Decisiones	Rafael Leonardo Franklin	Episode: "El misterio de Natalia" Episode: "Amantes" Episode: "Culpa ajena"
2007	Acorralada	Diego Suárez	Main role
2008	Valeria	Salvador Rivera	
2009–2010	Más sabe el diablo	Jimmy Cardona	
2010	¿Dónde está Elisa?	Cristóbal Rivas	
2010–2011	Aurora	Lorenzo Lobos	
2011	La casa de al lado	Matías Santa María	
2012	Corazón valiente	Miguel Valdez	
2012	Secreteando	Damián	Episode: "El chisme de los chismes"
2013	La Patrona	Alejandro Beltrán	Main role; 128 episodes
2014	En otra piel	Gerardo Fonsi / Juan Gerardo Suárez	Main Antagonist; 153 episodes
2016	Eva la trailera	Armando Montes	Main Antagonist; 118 episodes
2017	La Fan	El Tuerto Duarte	3 episodes
2017	Milagros de Navidad	Rafael Juárez	Episode: "Abriendo muros"
2019	Decisiones: Unos ganan, otros pierden	Carlos Díaz	Episode: "Furia en el tráfico"
2021	100 días para enamorarnos	Enrique Bianchini	Episode: "Ella o yo" Episode: La prueba de la infidelidad" Episode: "No te rindes"
2023	Vuelve a mí	Alberto Robles	Recurring role; 45 episodes
2026	El renacer de Luna	Félix Torres Martínez	

== Personal life ==
His first wife was called Yamili Valenzuela Canseco, Yuri's sister. He was briefly married to actress Anette Michel, his partner in Al norte de corazon. He has a daughter, Sabrina, born on March 8, 2007, from a relationship that ended in 2008.
