= Vanessa Villela =

Mexican-American actress (born 1978)

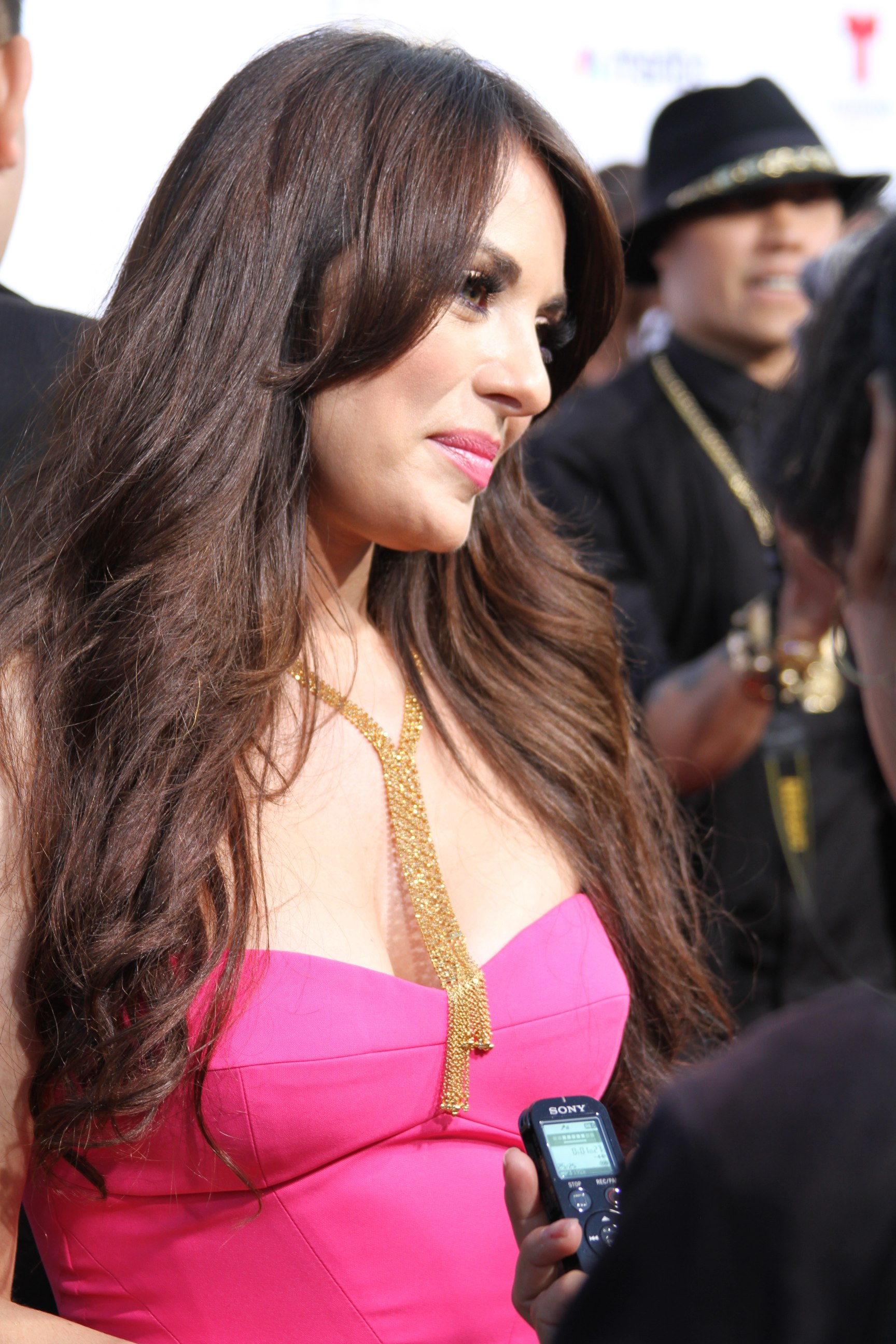
- Villela at the 2014 ALMA Awards
- Born: January 28, 1978 (age 48); Mexico City, Mexico
- Occupation: Real Estate Agent/Actress
- Years active: 1991–present
- Spouse: Nicholas Hardy (m. 2022)
- Partner: Mario Cimarro (2009–2013)

Vanessa Villela (born January 28, 1978) is a Mexican-American actress turned real estate agent, who appeared in Selling Sunset and Mexican TV series El señor de Los Cielos, Una Maid en Manhattan, El Cuerpo Del Deseo, Romántica obsesión, Ellas, inocentes o culpables, Súbete a mi moto, Un nuevo amor, El cuerpo del deseo, Decisiones, Amores de mercado. On October 2, 2017, Villela posted that she has become an American citizen.

== Filmography ==
Film roles
Year	Title	Roles	Notes
2005	Tres	Jacinda	Debut film
2018	En Altamar	Isabel	

Television roles
Year	Title	Roles	Notes
1991	Muchachitas	Student	
1992	Mágica juventud	Alicia	
1997	Mujer, Casos de la Vida Real	Unknown role	Episode: "La profecía"
1997	Amada enemiga	Sara	
1998	Gotita de amor	Naida	
1999	Romántica obsesión	Leticia	
2000	Ellas, inocentes o culpables	Cristina	
2000–2001	El amor no es como lo pintan	Cynthia Rico	
2001	Lo que callamos las mujeres	Julio's lover	Episode: "Equivocada"
2002–2003	Súbete a mi moto	Renata	
2003	Un nuevo amor	Karina Gutiérrez	
2005–2006	El Cuerpo del Deseo	Ángela Donoso	Series regular; 125 episodes
2006–2007	Amores de mercado	Mónica Savater / Raquel Savater	
2008	Tiempo final	María	Episode: "El anzuelo"
2010–2011	Eva Luna	Victoria Arisméndi	Series regular; 108 episodes
2011–2012	Una Maid en Manhattan	Sara Montero	Series regular; 168 episodes
2014	En otra piel	Elena Serrano	Series regular; 154 episodes
2016–2017	El Señor de los Cielos	Emiliana Contreras	(seasons 4–5); 32 episodes
2016	El Chema	Emiliana Contreras	Episode: "Espectacular fuga"
2017	Milagros de Navidad	Margaret Anderson	Episode: "Abriendo muros"
2021	Selling Sunset	Herself	10 Episodes

== Theater ==
- El protagonista (2002)

== Awards and nominations ==
Year	Association	Category	Won	Result
2012	Premios Tu Mundo	Una Maid en Manhattan	The Best Bad Girl	Nominated
2014	Premios People en Español	En otra piel	Best Bad Girl	Nominated
