= Súbete a mi moto =

2002-2003 Mexican telenovela

- Created by: Verónica Suárez; Eric Vonn
- Directed by: Eloy Ganuza; Nestor Galvan
- Starring: Vanessa Acosta; Mark Tacher; Sandra Echeverría; Michel Brown; Bárbara Mori; Jorge Luis Pila; Vanessa Villela; Alejandra Urdaín; Adrián Cue
- Opening theme: "Subete A Mi Moto" by Boom
- Country of origin: Mexico
- Original language: Spanish
- No. of episodes: 155

Production
- Producers: Gerardo Zurita; Elisa Salinas; Juan David Burns
- Editors: Jorge Monzon Lee; Carlos Olivares Álvarez
- Camera setup: Multi-camera
- Running time: 60 minutes

Original release
- Network: Azteca Trece
- Release: July 1, 2002 – January 24, 2003

Related
- Como en el cine (2001-2002); Enamórate (2003)

Subete a mi Moto is a Mexican telenovela produced by TV Azteca in 2002. Created by Verónica Suárez and Eric Vonn, It was broadcast on Azteca Trece (now Azteca Uno) from Monday July 1, 2002 to Friday January 24, 2003 for 155 episodes. The protagonists include Vanessa Acosta, Mark Tacher, Sandra Echeverria, Michel Brown, Alejandra Urdaín and Adrián Cue, and the antagonistic interpretation by Bárbara Mori, Jorge Luis Pila, Susana Alexander and Vanessa Villela.

== Plot ==
It is the story of four young people with different personalities, the four looking for love.

Mari Jo (Maria Jose), Mariana, and her two half sisters: Cecilia and Renata, seek to survive their family problems, trying to share a father, all four being daughters of different mothers, Harriet and Laura respectively, both of whom are good women, but who share very different points of views, for reasons of generation and personality.

Mariana and Renata, half-sisters, will fall in love with Richard and fight for him until the end. Not to mention that a third person, who is beautiful and evil, manipulates them into fighting each other.

Nelly, the jealous cousin of the girls, is the villain, along with her mother, Carmen, and Carlos. Ernesto, the father of the sisters, is the director of a major label, he is desolated after realizing it was not true that Harriet, his first wife, betrayed him, and after 20 years he found out the lies Angustias, his former mother in law, created. His two daughters from his first marriage believe he abandoned them. But that's not the worst.

Ernesto, now married to Laura and with two daughters, realizes upon seeing Harriet again he still loves her, but also loves his current wife. Can you love two women at once, but in different ways ?.

Mauricio, a friend of Richard and a Motocross champion, is in love with Renata who always treats him badly.

Maria Jose is the classic pretty girl who does not show her beauty too much so she will be seen for her mind and not her looks. MariJo falls for a man almost 10 years older than she is, causing a series of conflicts both because of the age difference between the two, and because of the way she is. At one point in the story, Marijo and Joseph will compete to be the best broadcasters, despite the love they have for each other.

Cecilia, the youngest of the sisters, whose personal conflict is not knowing what career path to choose after graduating from high school, does not realize the great love Cuco, the friendly shopkeeper's nephew who came to study psychology at the capital, has for her and whose platonic dream (Cuco's), is to become a singer.

But things will not be easy for Cuco because Michelangelo, the right hand of piracy czar Carlos, will want to possess Cecilia at all costs.

Ernesto, determined that his four daughters get along, suggested that he would live alone with the four girls, creating sentimental, emotional, and comedic situations for the soap opera.

== Cast ==
- Vanessa Acosta .... Mari Jo (Protagonist)
- Mark Tacher .... José (Protagonist)
- Sandra Echeverría .... Mariana (Protagonist)
- Michel Brown .... Ricardo (Protagonist)
- Bárbara Mori .... Nelly (Main female antagonist)
- Jorge Luis Pila .... Carlos (Main male antagonist)
- Vanessa Villela .... Renata (Antagonist)
- Alejandra Urdaín .... Cecilia (Protagonist)
- Adrián Cue .... Mauricio (Protagonist)
- Gabriela Roel .... Laura (Co-Protagonist)
- Fernando Ciangherotti .... Ernesto (Co-Protagonist)
- Monserrat Ontiveros .... Enriqueta
- Alejandro Gaytán .... Guillermo
- Christian Cataldi .... Miguel Ángel
- José Julián .... Cuco
- Carmen Delgado .... Carmen
- Alberto Casanova .... Teodoro
- Susana Alexander .... Doña Angustias (Antagonist)
- Enrique Novi .... Federico Guerra
- Enrique Becker .... Don Mickey
- Paola Núñez .... Leticia
- Irma Infante .... Bertha
- Carmen Zavaleta .... Sarita
- Gabriela Hassel .... Emilia
- Bertha Kaim .... Vanessa
- Altair Jarabo .... Gaby
- Gina Morett .... Mercedes
- Ramiro Orci .... Don Chucho
- José Ramón Escoriza .... Door-man
- César Cansdales .... Bartender
- Araceli Chavira .... Lupita
- Nubia Martí .... Tía Susana
- Eva Prado .... Elena
- Alma Martínez .... Chelita
- León Michel .... Rodolfo
- Luis Arrieta .... Jorge
- Rodrigo Abed
- Raquel Bustos

== Theme song ==
=== Subete A Mi Moto ===
==== Singer ====
- Menudo

==== Writer ====
- F. Diaz
- C. Villa

==== Producer ====
- Claudio Yarto
