= Gonzalo Peña =

Spanish television actor (born 1989)

- Born: June 3, 1989 (age 36); Palma de Mallorca, Spain
- Occupation: Actor
- Years active: 2014–present

Gonzalo Peña (born June 3, 1989) is a Spanish television actor. He is best known for his roles in telenovelas such as La malquerida, El hotel de los secretos and Despertar contigo. He was also featured in a television commercial for the travel booking company Trivago.

== Career ==
Born in the capital of the Balearic Islands, Palma de Mallorca, Spain, Peña studied theater at the New York Film Academy, then continued his studies in Madrid and later entered the Centro de Educación Artística in Mexico. Peña began his career in television in the telenovela of José Alberto Castro, La malquerida premieres in 2014. In 2015 participated in the telenovela Antes muerta que Lichita production of Rosy Ocampo. In 2016 he entered the cast of the telenovela El hotel de los secretos. In that same year he was made known through the commercial "Trivago.com". He was also part of the main cast of Despertar contigo as the main villain of the story. In 2017 he auditioned for the telenovela Enamorándome de Ramón, where he was chosen and shares credits with Esmeralda Pimentel and José Ron.

At the beginning of March 2021, Mexican actress Daniela Berriel accused Peña of being an accomplice to sexual abuse, stating that "the actor was present at the time of the rape, but he did not try to arrest the aggressor or do anything to defend her." Peña was temporarily suspended from filming of the telenovela, ¿Qué le pasa a mi familia?. Subsequently, on March 22, 2021, the actor was announced fired from the show by the producer Juan Osorio, and was replaced by Fernando Noriega to play his character.

== Filmography ==
List of appearances in television series and specials
Year	Title	Role	Notes
2014	La malquerida	Arturo	Recurring role; Television debut
2015	Antes muerta que Lichita	Ángel	Special Appearance
2016	El hotel de los secretos	Ignacio Alarcón	Recurring role
2016	Despertar contigo	Federico Villegas	Supporting role
2017	Enamorándome de Ramón	Francisco Santillán	Supporting role
2018	Hijas de la luna	Fernando Ruíz Melgarejo	Supporting role
2018-2019	Amar a muerte	Guillermo Carvajal	Main cast
2019	Cita a ciegas	Marcelo Herrera Toscano	Main cast
2021	¿Qué le pasa a mi familia?	Mariano Rueda Torres	Main cast
2025	Doménica Montero	Roberto Sangenís	Main cast
