= ¿Qué le pasa a mi familia? =

Mexican telenovela

- Genre: Telenovela
- Based on: What Happens to My Family? by Kang Eun-kyung
- Written by: Pablo Ferrer; Santiago Pineda
- Directed by: Azela Robinson; Bonnie Cartas; Aurelio Ávila
- Starring: Diana Bracho; César Évora; Julián Gil; Gabriela Platas; Emilio Osorio; Gonzalo Peña; Eva Cedeño; Mané de la Parra; Fernando Noriega
- Theme music composer: J. Eduardo Murguía; Mauricio Arriaga; Mane de la Parra; Emilio Osorio
- Opening theme: "Es una locura" by Mane de la Parra & Emilio Osorio
- Country of origin: Mexico
- Original language: Spanish
- No. of seasons: 1
- No. of episodes: 102

Production
- Executive producer: Juan Osorio
- Producers: Ignacio Ortiz Castillo; Ruy Rojas Vargas
- Editors: Felipe Ortiz Canseco; Norma Ramírez Ortiz; Socorro Manrique Díaz
- Production company: Televisa

Original release
- Network: Las Estrellas
- Release: 22 February – 11 July 2021

¿Qué le pasa a mi familia? (English title: Keeping My Family Together) is a Mexican telenovela that aired on Las Estrellas from 22 February 2021 to 11 July 2021. The series is produced by Juan Osorio. It is an adaptation of the South Korean series What Happens to My Family?, and stars Diana Bracho, Mané de la Parra, and Eva Cedeño.

== Plot ==
Luz has dedicated her life to raising her three children: Regina, Mariano and Lalo. They each have different personalities and a strained relationship with one another. Regina, the eldest child, serves as the executive assistant to the president of a major clothing and footwear company. Due to past experiences, she has no interest in falling in love. She meets and falls in love with Patricio Iturbide, the director of one of the most important fashion and footwear companies in Mexico. Mariano is a respected oncologist who is ashamed of his mother and family. He attempts to elevate his social status by marrying Cony, the daughter of the owner of the hospital where he works. Lalo, the youngest child, is a 19-year-old taking a gap year while he looks for a job that will allow him to prove his worth, as he struggles to achieve self-recognition and feel worthy of being loved. Absorbed in their work and personal ambitions, Regina, Mariano and Lalo have grown distant from their mother. When Luz receives a diagnosis of terminal cancer, she decides to hide her condition and takes extreme measures to teach her children a lesson. Knowing she does not have much time left, she sues them to force them to change, aiming to bring them together and forming a united family.

== Cast ==
=== Main ===
- Diana Bracho as Luz Torres Mendoza
- César Évora as Jesús Rojas Bañuelos
- Julián Gil as Carlos Iturbide Urquidi
- Gabriela Platas as Violeta Anaya Escobar
- Emilio Osorio as Lalo Rueda Torres
- Gonzalo Peña as Mariano Rueda Torres (episodes 1–43)
- Eva Cedeño as Regina Rueda Torres
- Mané de la Parra as Patricio Iturbide Casanova
- Julio Bracho as Esteban Astudillo Vidal
- Wendy de los Cobos as Alfonsina "Ponchita" Torres Mendoza
- René Casados as Wenceslao Rueda Cortés
- Paulina Matos as Constanza "Cony" Astudillo Anaya
- Lisette Morelos as Ofelia del Olmo Gascón
- Gloria Aura as Federica Muñoz Torres
- Danka as Marisol "Sol" Morales Flores
- Mauricio Abad as Alan Barba del Olmo
- Margarita Vega as Pamela Pérez Nava
- Roberta Burns as Gilda Huerta Godínez
- Claudia Arce as Salma Montes de Oca Medinilla
- Tania Nicole as Isabel Vázquez Muñoz
- Adolfo de la Fuente as Miguel "Mike" Vázquez Peralta
- Rafael Inclán as Fulgencio Morales Yela
- Fernando Noriega as Mariano Rueda Torres (episodes 43–102)

=== Recurring ===
- Nicole Chávez as Camila Castillo Jaurello
- Beatriz Morayra as Rosalba Reyes Toledo
- Sherlyn as Jade Castillo Jaurello
- Juan Martín Jáuregui as Iván García Altamirano
- Sergio Basáñez as Porfirio Reiner Springer
- Lucía Zerecero as Zafiro Castillo Jaurello
- Magaly Torres as María Olivares Zapata
- Claudia Silva as Brenda Macías Vega
- Iker Vallin as Maximiliano Macías Vega
- Eva Daniela as Lorena Pineda

=== Guest stars ===
- Kali Uchis as Claudia

== Production ==
The production was announced on 16 June 2020, during the Univision Upfront for the 2020–2021 television season. Filming began on 9 November 2020 in Guanajuato City. Location shooting in Guanajuato City concluded on 29 May 2021, while filming at Televisa San Ángel concluded on 12 June 2021.

=== Casting ===
On 1 September 2020, it was confirmed that José Ron and Ariadne Díaz would star in the lead roles. However, on 23 September 2020, José Ron announced that he would not participate in the telenovela. On 16 October 2020, Ariadne Díaz announced that she would no longer star in the telenovela due to prior commitments. Elizabeth Álvarez and Karol Sevilla were also considered but both decided to reject the telenovela. On 19 October 2020, the full cast was revealed, with Mané de la Parra and Eva Cedeño set to play the leads.

== Ratings ==
Viewership and ratings per season of ¿Qué le pasa a mi familia?
Season	Timeslot (CT)	Episodes	First aired		Last aired		Avg. viewers (millions)
Season	Timeslot (CT)	Episodes	Date	Viewers (millions)	Date	Viewers (millions)	Avg. viewers (millions)
1	Mon–Fri 8:30 p.m.	99	22 February 2021	3.0	11 July 2021	3.8	3.07

== Episodes ==
No.	Title	Original release date	Mexico viewers (millions)
1	"La paciencia es una ciencia"	22 February 2021 (Note: Premiered early online through Las Estrellas website on 18 February 2021.)	3.0
Luz is celebrating her birthday, but her children seem to have forgotten. In the office, Regina and Patricio do not stop colliding. Lalo and Sol meet each other.
2	"Cuando nos llueve, ¡nos truena!"	23 February 2021	2.6
Luz helps Lalo get out of jail. Lalo breaks Sol's heart. Mariano calls Lalo irresponsible and blames Luz for it. Luz tries to fix things between her children. Patricio still does not forgive his father.
3	"¡Que hoy sea un día tranquilo!"	24 February 2021	2.8
The Rueda house turns into chaos in the morning when they find Sol stealing food. Patricio finds his father showing Regina an engagement ring, so he thinks she is Carlos's lover. Patricio demands that his father appoint Regina as his secretary to control her.
4	"Como pollo en rosticero"	25 February 2021	2.9
After having a bad day, Regina starts drinking with Sol, they both lose control and end up kissing Patricio and Lalo. Alfonsina is upset that Regina drank too much. Mariano lies to the Astudillos about Luz's profession. Lalo can't stop thinking about his kiss with Sol.
5	"Lo voy a desplumar"	26 February 2021	3.1
Carlos explains to Regina that Patricio already knows about his relationship with Ofelia and asks her to return to the office. Sol brings breakfast to Luz and she is very happy with her details. Regina agrees to be Patricio's secretary, but challenges him that in a month he will accept that she is indispensable. Sol tries to stop a thief, but when the thief pushes her, Alan comes to her rescue. Luz is moved by Lalo's gift of new shoes. Lalo has a reason to be jealous of Alan. Pamela introduces herself to Luz as Mariano's girlfriend.
6	"Una familia rota"	1 March 2021	2.8
Mariano explodes when he sees Pamela at his house and complains to her for pretending to be his girlfriend. Mariano minimizes his mother for being selling chicken, rejects Luz's love and assures her that, the day he gets married, they will never see him again. Regina tries to win the battle against Patricio and remodels the office. Sol looks for Alan to give him his jacket and he discovers that she is the girl who saved his life.
7	"Desestabilizar a la familia Rueda"	2 March 2021	3.0
Luz is saddened to learn that Mariano invented that she is a chef. Alan discovers that Lalo hid the truth from Sol. Regina spies on Patricio in the restaurant and is shocked by the way he eats. When he sees her, he spits the wine on her and when he tries to clean her, he accidentally touches her breasts, getting into a big mess. Violeta proposes to Mariano to marry Cony and, in addition, she looks for Wenceslao to find out everything about the Rueda family. Thanks to an entanglement, Regina imposes three rules on Patricio to avoid being arrested. Luz finds Lalo and Sol together in bed.
8	"Más turbio que el agua de los frijoles"	3 March 2021	2.8
Patricio decides to leave dinner when he meets Alan and discovers that he is Ofelia's son. Lalo gives Sol a gift. Regina shows Patricio how skilled she is at changing a tire and leaves him speechless. Ofelia proposes to Carlos that she and Alan go live in his house. Luz receives an anonymous to go to the motel and when she arrives at the appointment she discovers that Wenceslao is not dead.
9	"Quiero recuperar a mi familia"	4 March 2021	3.1
Wenceslao reveals to Luz the reasons why he returned, but she does not want him to go near her children. The friendship between Regina and Patricio grows more and more. Wenceslao and Violeta join forces to separate the Rueda family. Constanza makes it clear to Mariano that they are destined to be together and they end up kissing. Lalo reveals to Luz that he does not accept himself as he is, but she asks him to lean on her and together they will succeed.
10	"El amor está sobrevalorado"	5 March 2021	2.7
Mariano announces to the family that he will marry Cony; Luz discovers that it is out of interest. Patricio decides to leave the house when he learns that Ofelia will live with them. Ofelia asks Regina to help Patricio accept that she give the speech at the event or her job could be in jeopardy. Mariano asks his whole family to be present at a meal to meet his future in-laws Los Astudillo.
11	"Un evento memorable"	8 March 2021	2.9
The Rueda arrive soaked at the meal with the Astudillos and Luz takes the opportunity to make it clear that she sells roasted chicken and not a chef. At the Cklass event, Ofelia is reckless and Patricio decides to fire Regina for feeling betrayed by his secretary. Patricio complains to Carlos for allowing his wife to announce their engagement. Wenceslao reveals his identity in front of his children.
12	"Víctima de las circunstancias"	9 March 2021	3.1
Wenceslao tells his children that all this time he was absent he was in a coma and now he just wants to regain happiness but Regina does not believe him. For Patricio, Regina is a traitor and decides to go ahead with her dismissal.
13	"Todos unidos para defendernos"	10 March 2021	3.0
Alan surprises Sol with a musical show. Lalo gets jealous, looks for Alan and ends up hitting him. Regina needs her mom to get out of depression after losing her job. The Ruedas family makes a pact of love so that nothing and no one separates them. Violeta asks Wenceslao to discover the most vulnerable points of her children.
14	"La sangre no miente"	11 March 2021	3.0
The Rueda's defend themselves after hearing the threats made to Federica, Luz defends her family but falls and takes a heavy blow. Regina returns to work and Patricio is surprised. Lalo makes a serious mistake in the restaurant kitchen and Luz's business could be shut down. Wenceslao approaches Lalo to tell him that he has his unconditional support, which he demonstrates with a substantial sum of money.
15	"Regina pone a Patricio en su lugar"	12 March 2021	3.0
Luz meets Jesús Rojas and is impressed with the compliments and support she receives from him. Patricio kisses Regina to make his ex-partner jealous. Ofelia does not want Sol for her son. After stealing an unexpected kiss, Patricio confesses to Regina that it was his ex-fiancee's fault. Patricio defends Regina from Francisco's insinuations and ends up hitting him hard so that he learns to respect women. Regina slaps Patricio in the face. Wenceslao talks to Luz to ask her to let him get close to Lalo. Ofelia and Carlos argue and both decide to call off their wedding.
16	"Quiero a mi familia entera"	15 March 2021	2.8
Carlos knows the real reason why his son beat businessman Francisco Santibáñez. Violeta gives Luz a lot of money to 'help' her. Lalo and the whole family envision a great life if they were to cash the check in their hands. Luz informs Mariano that his ex-mother-in-law left her a fortune for him to marry Constanza. Luz can't bear to see her entire family waiting to use the check that Violeta gave her, so she ends up tearing it up. Violeta asks Esteban to fire Mariano. Violeta dreams of building her building on the land of the Rueda house. Regina assures her brother that she is leaving her mother in a humiliating situation, but he will not let his family get in the way of his decisions. Sol is disappointed in Lalo.
17	"La necesito señorita Rueda"	16 March 2021	3.0
Patricio asks Regina to work together again and they both question their feelings. Lalo and Alan compete to see who can eat the most hot wings. Mariano demands that Luz give Wenceslao asylum or he will leave the house, Luz finally accepts that Wenceslao live for a few days in the house.
18	"Al toro se le agarra por los cuernos"	17 March 2021	3.0
Luz informs the family that Wenceslao will live in the house for some time. Luz assures her sister that she will soon discover the lies of Mariano's father. Federica and Mike have a romantic evening. Regina is very upset to see that her dad returned home. Luz meets Jesús in a very funny way, but Wenceslao, seeing that his ex-wife is having a good time with another man, gets jealous. Carlos proposes to Patricio to work with his ex-girlfriend Salma.
19	"Me rompieron el corazón"	18 March 2021	2.8
Salma advises Regina again about Patricio and he becomes very nervous when he meets his ex-girlfriend in the office. Federica and Alfonsina tell Luz that Sol and Lalo spent the night together. Carlos asks Salma to give Patricio a second chance. Wenceslao paid the fine for the rotisserie, so it reopens its doors. Sol learns that, as a child, she saved Alan in the river and not Lalo. After feeling betrayed, she decides to return to her grandfather.
20	"La mujer que da luz a mi existencia"	19 March 2021	2.9
Sol decides to return to her town next to her grandfather after discovering Lalo and Alan's lie. Luz doesn't understand Sol's decision and questions Lalo. Regina falls into Violeta's trap when she buys the apartment. Wenceslao proposes marriage to Luz, but she only feels revulsion towards him. Jesús paints the facade of the rotisserie. Constanza and Violeta visit the Rueda family to choose the type of wedding invitations and to set a date for the wedding. Lalo is depressed by Sol's decision.
21	"Que vueltas da la vida"	22 March 2021	2.9
Jesus wants to defend and support Luz in a selfless way. Regina falls into Violeta's trap and agrees to ask her for money for her apartment. Ofelia apologizes to Alan, agrees that she is wrong and begs him not to attempt on his life again. Patricio discovers that Regina is the owner of the apartment he wants to rent; she hesitates to accept him as a tenant. Fulgencio arrives in Guanajuato looking for his granddaughter. Fulgencio, Alan and Lalo go in search of Sol at the bus terminal, Lalo asks Sol to stay with him in Guanajuato. Regina and Patricio reach an agreement and she will be Patricio's landlady.
22	"Te largas de mi casa"	23 March 2021	2.9
Salma arrives to start the photo shoot and Carlos proposes to have another model. Regina gets jealous. Jesús informs Luz that he has information on Wenceslao. Regina demonstrates her modeling skills by acting as the Cklass image for Patricio and Carlos. Thanks to Jesús, Luz already knows the whole truth about Wenceslao, so she demands that he leave the house, but he enrages and hits her, Regina, Lalo and Mariano defend their mother and they all kick him out of the house.
23	"Cada quien cosecha lo que siembra"	24 March 2021	2.8
Wenceslao leaves the house; Luz asks her children to unite as siblings. Violeta complains to Wenceslao for causing her plans to be lost. Jesús is enraged when he learns that Wenceslao hit Luz. Wenceslao tries to hit Jesús, but he shows him who is stronger and demands that he get away from Luz. Patricio tells Regina that he wants to be closer to her and Lalo declares his love for Sol.
24	"La culpa del amor"	25 March 2021	2.7
Patricio and Regina kiss and Regina confesses that she has been dying to kiss him for a long time. Regina prefers to remain single and does not want to mix love with work. Patricio receives an eviction order from the apartment and is surprised. Lalo suffers for the love of Sol and unburdens himself with his mother. Fulgencio has a mishap with Alfonsina and Luz puts them in their place. Patricio is evicted and Regina discovers that she was the victim of a scam and lost all her money.
25	"Ruedan los problemas"	26 March 2021	2.7
Regina and Patricio explain everything to Carlos to prevent him from confusing things. Sol only wants her and Lalo to be friends but he does not accept it. Lalo lies to Don Fulgencio and makes him believe that he is a chef at the restaurant. Constanza is very excited about her wedding dress. Ponchita and Violeta do not stop fighting. Regina learns that she was the victim of fraud. Max, a little boy, arrives at the Rueda house and claims to be Mariano's son. Luz is shocked by the news and promises to take care of him until things are resolved.
26	"Cuando nos llueve, nos llovizna"	29 March 2021	2.5
Regina becomes jealous when she finds out that Salma will have dinner at Carlos's house with Patricio. Alan ends up firing chef Vladimir. Lalo wants to earn Don Fulgencio's trust. Mariano rejects that Max is his son, but Luz supports Max in this moment. Regina suffers for everything that happens in her life, but Patricio supports her. Patricio insists on giving Regina a chance, but she decides to curb her feelings so as not to get hurt. Mariano mocks Jesús and Violeta is surprised to see him.
27	"¿Por qué es tan difícil vivir?"	30 March 2021	2.6
Regina confesses to Federica that she is beginning to love Patricio, but does not want to go out with a broken heart. Violeta is surprised to see Jesús at the Rueda's house. Federica tells everything to her husband. Salma confesses to Patricio that she still loves him and steals a kiss from him. Regina suffers for love and Luz offers her love to comfort her. Jesús confronts Violeta and fears that she will plan something against the Rueda.
28	"Me enamoré de ti"	31 March 2021	N/A
Mariano and Max are going to have a DNA test. Violeta makes it clear to Esteban that he is only her employee. Patricio with a sign confesses to Regina that he loves her. Carlos asks Regina to help him so that his son gets back together with Salma. Fulgencio wants to see what Lalo is made of, so he puts him to work that puts him to the test. Jesús reveals to Luz who Violeta is.
29	"Abrir la caja de pandora"	1 April 2021	2.3
Patricio is sure that Regina loves him. Jesús confesses to Luz that Violeta is his sister. Mariano will help Brenda with her cancer treatment. Constanza's proposal turns into chaos after several stumbles. Esteban demands the truth about Brenda from Mariano. Sol faints. Luz questions Violeta about her true intentions. Patricio is wounded with a knife by the man who scammed Regina. Jesús confronts those who are after Federica.
30	"Lo que mueve al mundo es el amor"	2 April 2021	2.4
Alan arrives at the Rueda's house to help Sol. Violeta is upset seeing her glasses broken, but Esteban only wants to celebrate Cony's engagement with Mariano. Mariano asks for Cony's hand in front of the whole family. Pamela meets Max at the hospital. Patricio informs Regina that her debt has been paid off; she suspects it was him and they both seal their love with a kiss. Mariano receives the DNA results.
31	"Amor en secreto"	5 April 2021	2.8
Patricio makes it clear to Regina that he plans to fight for her love. Federica confesses everything to Alfonsina and she judges her by the way she dresses. Esteban decides to break the engagement between Mariano and Cony after learning that Mariano has a son. Regina asks Patricio to keep their relationship a secret. Luz has a strong pain and drops some items, Jesús helps her and Max wants him to be his grandfather. Regina feels uncomfortable with the presence of Porfirio, Federica's former boss.
32	"Tú eres mi sueño hecho realidad"	6 April 2021	2.7
Sol agrees that she loves Lalo and they seal their love with a kiss. Constanza leaves home and comes to live with the Rueda family. Regina and Patricio say goodbye to loneliness together at a romantic dinner. Luz agrees to let Cony stay at her house and gives her various cooking tips. Violeta looks for Constanza at the Rueda's house and decides to take her away, but Luz protects.
33	"Nada de chismes"	7 April 2021	2.8
Alan invites Sol to his mother's wedding and Lalo gets jealous when he finds out. The Rueda are concerned about Regina's whereabouts. Regina and Patricio are almost discovered by their parents, but they both manage to get out of the entanglement. Jesús confronts Porfirio and makes it clear that everyone already knows what he did to Federica. Luz makes the decision to adopt Max so that Mariano and Constanza can marry without problems.
34	"Tenemos que tirar todo el machismo"	8 April 2021	N/A
Luz proposes herself as Max's tutor. Patricio tries to reason with his former partner. Regina plans to unmask Porfirio. Esteban discovers that Mariano is not Max's father. Regina and Alfonsina argue about the harassment Federica experienced. The wedding between Mariano and Constanza is resumed. Alfonsina ends up supporting her daughter for the harassment she suffered. Sol and Lalo kiss again.
35	"Votos de amor"	9 April 2021	3.2
Alan picks up Sol at the Rueda family's house, where he sees Lalo, who gives him a warning. Carlos and Ofelia swear eternal love before the eyes of their guests. Jesús tells Luz a little about his past. Regina takes the courage to talk to Patricio about Porfirio. Carlos and Ofelia enjoy their wedding night. Lalo is assaulted in Alan's restaurant.
36	"La oveja negra de la familia"	12 April 2021	2.6
Iván tries to win back Regina and returns to look for her. Lalo's ex-gang gets him in trouble. Regina tells Patricio everything about Porfirio. Lalo is arrested for allegedly robbing Alan's restaurant. Esteban can't bear to see Jesús in his house and sets up a scene of jealousy for Violeta. The Rueda find out that Lalo is in jail. Esteban decides to separate from Violeta.
37	"Las mujeres unidas somos más fuertes"	13 April 2021	2.7
Pamela kisses Esteban and he reciprocates. Regina and Patricio take advantage of a meal at Carlos's house to unmask Porfirio for what he did to Federica. Lalo gets out of jail. Carlos and Ofelia promise to help Federica to make Porfirio pay for his abuse. Regina wants to take a step in their relationship, so she makes a proposal to Patricio.
38	"Enfrentamos al mundo con amor"	14 April 2021	2.9
Patricio agrees to be Regina's boyfriend after playing a prank on her. Luz and Jesús receive strange messages to go on a date. Ofelia visits Federica at the Rueda's house to prepare the interview and is surprised to see that Patricio accompanied Regina to her house. Lalo asks Sol to be his girlfriend and she decides to say yes. Esteban confesses his infidelity to Violeta. Luz suspects that there is something between Regina and Patricio.
39	"No me quiero convertir en una mujer como tú"	15 April 2021	2.7
Patricio makes it clear to Luz that he is not interested in Regina. Violeta takes out all her anger when she finds out that Esteban was unfaithful to her. Regina complains to Luz for embarrassing her in front of Patricio and breaks her heart. Sol and Lalo announce their relationship to the family. Jesús questions his feelings for Luz. Mariano tells Violeta that Cony is at his house. Patricio imagines Ofelia making him and Regina suffer in the office. Violeta destroys everything and vows revenge.
40	"Cita de amor como de telenovela"	16 April 2021	2.4
Patricio demands that Regina go public with their relationship. Federica comes to Ofelia's program to talk about the abuse she suffered by Porfirio Reiner and he tries to flee but is eventually arrested. Luz comes to meet her secret admirer, and discovers that it is Jesús. Sol, Lalo and Alan do everything to make the restaurant thieves fall.
41	"Diferentes clases de amor"	19 April 2021	2.6
Lalo asks Claudia for advice and ends up dedicating a song to Sol in front of everyone at the karaoke. Camila insults Sol and she decides to put a stop to her and ends up hitting her. Patricio and Regina take another step in their relationship. Carlos feels bad that his son does not trust him to tell him about his new relationship.
42	"El día más esperado ha llegado"	20 April 2021	2.8
Jade and Patricio meet outside the office and while he confront her for taking his parking spot, she is delighted. Regina asks Iván not to look for her again and slaps him. Before the wedding, Luz asks Cony to love herself. Carlos welcomes Jade just like Patricio and Regina is upset to learn that Jade is interested in Patricio. Cony and Mariano are finally going to unite their lives before God, but Wenceslao arrives to interrupt the ceremony.
43	"La quiero cada día más"	21 April 2021	3.1
After Wenceslao's interruption, Mariano and Cony's wedding takes place and the two join their lives. Patricio wants to tell his father about his relationship with Regina. Carlos discovers Patricio and Regina kissing and confronts both of them, because he feels betrayed. Jesús asks Luz not to deny what they are both feeling. Constanza and Mariano will have their wedding night.
44	"Los cuentos no siempre tienen final feliz"	22 April 2021	3.0
Mariano rejects Constanza on their wedding night. Fulgencio suffers an accident when stumbling in the kitchen. Iván hits Patricio when he saw that he was pulling Regina. Patricio has a strong argument with Regina, for hiding her past with her ex-boyfriend Iván. Fulgencio is taken to hospital after his fall. Carlos decides that Regina stops being his son's assistant and the relationship between Patricio and Regina is not going well, so they will have to question their feelings.
45	"Juntos podemos contra todo"	23 April 2021	2.9
Patricio and Regina decide to continue with their relationship and thus overcome any adversity. Violeta imagines selling rotisserie chickens and being abused by Luz. Rosalba attacks Regina during a business meeting, she complains to Regina for having ended her marriage with Iván. Regina and Patricio talk to Luz about their relationship and she ends up rejecting their relationship.
46	"¿Debería vender esta propiedad?"	26 April 2021	2.8
Violeta finds Pamela in Esteban's office and imagines giving Pamela a tremendous beating for suspecting that she is her husband's lover. Despite not having the support of Luz, Regina and Patricio will continue with their relationship. Mariano initiates the plan to make Luz sell the property. Regina gets jealous of Jade seeing her so close to Patricio. Mariano talks with his siblings, to propose that they put his mother's house and store up for sale.
47	"Una herencia en vida"	27 April 2021	3.0
Mariano, Lalo and Regina agree to convince Luz to sell everything in order to have an advanced inheritance. After the possibility of inheriting while alive, Lalo dreams of being a millionaire and having enough money to pamper his mother and Sol. Regina and Patricio have a very romantic night. Jade runs into Jesús at Regina's house. Esteban puts a stop to Violeta. Jade accuses in front of the Ruedas that Jesús murdered her mother, but Luz defends him. Luz eats with Patricio.
48	"Cría cuervos y te sacarán los ojos"	28 April 2021	2.7
Ofelia, Jade and Rosalba come together to discredit Regina, so that her relationship with Patricio ends. Patricio confronts Ofelia for having slandered Regina with the help of Jade and Rosalba. Luz and Jesús decide to take a step forward and seal their relationship with a kiss. Patricio and Ivan fight.
49	"¿Por qué ser feliz es tan complicado?"	29 April 2021	2.7
Patricio and Ivan fight to blows and Carlos along with Regina arrive to stop the fight. Luz and Jesús affirm that the kiss was the most wonderful. Luz begins to feel severe pain and passes out. None of the Rueda siblings answer their phone. Fortunately, Ponchita is there for her sister.
50	"La vida es muy corta"	30 April 2021	2.7
The doctor performs several studies on Luz and informs her that she is very ill. Regina and Patricio manage to be rescued after spending several hours stuck in the elevator. The Rueda are happy to see Luz back, but Ponchita makes her sister see that her children need a good scolding. Luz announces to the whole family that she will sell the land and Mariano demands to know what relationship there is between Jesús and Luz, so he confesses the truth in an emotional moment.
51	"Voy a demandar a mis hijos"	3 May 2021	3.0
Max takes Regina's card to pay for his games without thinking about the consequences. Regina realizes that her card was cloned and all her savings stolen. Luz realizes that Max is responsible for Regina's theft and Mariano almost loses patience with him. The argument between the Rueda spirals out of control, to the point where the three siblings get hurt. Luz, fed up and tired, wants to sue her children.
52	"Poner límites"	4 May 2021	2.8
Luz demands that her children apologize to Ponchita and warns them that everything will change from that moment on. Violeta loses her sanity when Luz desists of selling her house. Esteban wants Mariano and his daughter to have children soon. Max is lost. Luz confesses to Jesús that she will sue her children. The Rueda siblings are sued by their mother.
53	"La ley los meterá en cintura"	5 May 2021	3.1
Luz with the help of Iván begins the proceedings of the lawsuit against her children. Mariano learns that he is sterile. Violeta is very excited about a grandson without knowing that her son-in-law is sterile. Regina complains to Iván for helping her mother in the lawsuit against her and her brothers and Patricio secondes her. Regina could lose her job because of her family problems. Camila is afraid she is pregnant with Alan. Luz asks her children to speak to their lawyer and not to her.
54	"¿Quieres ser mi novia?"	6 May 2021	3.0
While Constanza and Mariano cannot have children, Camila and Alan find out that they will be parents. The Rueda find out that by law half of their salary will go to Luz. Luz begins to charge everything to her children. Luz does not want to tell her sister the truth about her health and why she is suing her children. Constanza feels pressured by her parents. Luz complains to her doctor for the bad diagnosis he gave her. The Astudillos will not help Mariano with legal aid against Luz. Jesús hands Luz an engagement ring. Lalo breaks up with Sol.
55	"No juegues con fuego"	7 May 2021	3.0
Ofelia confronts the Astudillos over the lawsuit that Luz filed against her children. Camila's sisters want Alan to marry her. The alimony lawsuit against Luz's children begins. Esteban goes crazy when he finds out that his daughter will not be able to have children.
56	"Cuando los hijos se van"	10 May 2021	2.4
Since they have to live in the same house and work together, Sol and Lalo make a pact to improve their relationship. After fighting with her mother, Regina shows that she can put up with anything. Regina decides to leave the house when she sees that Luz continues with Iván as her lawyer. Violeta has a plan to make Constanza be a mother.
57	"Un programa inolvidable"	11 May 2021	3.3
Luz and Mariano are surprised to learn that Brenda wants to get Max back, she is determined to spend her last days with her son. Max suffers from having to separate from his family. Ofelia invites Mariano to her television program and he accuses Luz of being interested and Jesús of suggesting that she sue her children.
58	"Lista de condiciones"	12 May 2021	3.4
Brenda decides to take Max, he and Luz cry and say goodbye. During the hearing, Luz along with her lawyer announced to Lalo, Regina and Marino that, in order to drop the lawsuit, they must follow a series of petitions.
59	"Un salto desde la cima del Everest"	13 May 2021	3.0
Violeta embarks on a new plan to finish off the Rueda. Regina is terrified of getting married. Cony wants to go live with Luz because she is afraid of her parents. Rosalba insults Regina and she returns a tremendous slap.
60	"Ni una humillación más"	14 May 2021	2.9
Sol tries to console Alan for his depression, but he gets confused and kisses her. Alan demands that Ofelia leave his bedroom, but when she tries to slap him, Sol stops her and confronts her. Mariano complains to Cony for faking being pregnant and accepting Luz's condition, but she complains about feeling tired of his rejection and the insults at home. Mariano agrees to return to the Rueda house. Regina puts a stop to Ofelia's constant humiliation. Camila confesses that the baby she is expecting is not Alan's.
61	"Mi último Día de las Madres"	17 May 2021	3.0
Regina surprises everyone with the dress that Patricio gave her and both defend their love from the provocations of Jade, Rosalba and Ofelia. Lalo wants to be a better person. Regina and Lalo leave their grudges behind and congratulate Luz on Mother's Day. Luz confesses the truth about her health to Jesús.
62	"¿Quieres ser mi esposa?"	18 May 2021	3.1
Ofelia gets fed up with Carlos and Alan's attacks and decides to leave the house with all her suitcases. After learning the truth, Jesús swears eternal love to Luz and asks her to give him the privilege of being her husband. Pamela discovers that Mariano is infertile. After learning that the baby is not his, Alan wants to feel alive and reveals to Sol that he wants to be by her side; Lalo listens to them.
63	"En el corazón no se manda"	19 May 2021	2.8
Regina refuses to marry and explains that free union is common, but the family demands a national survey to see if they marry or not. Esteban is upset to learn that Ofelia will be his guest. Jade and Patricio have coffee, but Regina finds them hugging, which causes her to get jealous. As Regina and Patricio fight over everything, she decides to go home and take some time.
64	"Cumplir nuestros sueños"	20 May 2021	3.2
Regina surprises the Rueda’s by returning to live in her house. Luz decides to organize a quinceañera party for Ponchita. Patricio unburdens himself with Carlos by telling him that he feels bad about being separated from Regina. Patricio receives a big hug from Carlos. Violeta offers Jade to buy Camila's baby. Jesús prepares a surprise for Luz.
65	"Los cuentos de hadas sí existen"	21 May 2021	3.0
Luz agrees to marry Jesús. The Rueda siblings continue cleaning the house. Patricio and Iván face each other again and he wants to find an opportunity with Regina. Luz announces to the family that she will marry Jesús, the Rueda siblings are shocked by the news, but Mariano rejects the decision and threatens not to go to the wedding.
66	"Crisis de ansiedad"	24 May 2021	2.9
Jade agrees to sell Camila's baby to Violeta and when Camila finds out, she tries to take some abortion pills, but Violeta stops her. Jesús helps Lalo take out all his anger. Regina faints and Luz runs desperate because she believes that something bad happened to her daughter. Ofelia invites Sol and Fulgencio to her program. The Rueda family already have everything ready for Alfonsina's quinceañera party.
67	"Los XV años de Ponchita"	25 May 2021	3.1
The Rueda and several guests come together to celebrate Ponchita. Luz sends a message of love to all the guests during her sister's quinceañera party. Patricio manages to surprise Regina with his steps on the dance floor. The time has come to cut the cake at Ponchita's party, so Violeta takes the opportunity to get revenge on her friend.
68	"Yo no sirvo para el amor"	26 May 2021	3.2
Jade takes a moment to tell Patricio how much she likes him. Regina finds Patricio making out with Jade, enrages and ends the relationship. Jade assures Regina that she will fight for Patricio. Mariano and Regina bond more like siblings when they tell each other about their problems; Luz listens to them.
69	"¡Explotó la rosticería de doña Luz!"	27 May 2021	2.8
Luz imposes three new conditions for her children. Mariano confesses to Violeta that Pamela knows that Constanza is not pregnant. Ofelia takes advantage of the cameras of her program to make a complaint against Carlos. Violeta threatens Pamela with ending her career if she talks about Constanza's pregnancy. Violeta orders an accident to be caused at the Mamá Gallina establishment without imagining that Constanza suffers the consequences.
70	"Voy a vender todo"	28 May 2021	2.9
Mariano confesses to Cony that when he saw her on the floor he was afraid of losing her. Jade continues to provoke Regina's jealousy. Regina is surprised to see that Iván is the man Luz made a date for her. After the explosion, Luz is determined to sell her business and the house. Violeta, in her wild imagination, celebrates that her plan is working. Regina makes it clear to Patricio that she is not interested in dating someone else and he gets jealous. Jesús believes that Violeta is behind the explosion.
71	"Te vas a ir al cielo con todo y pollos"	31 May 2021	2.9
Luz agrees to sell her house and business to Violeta; she celebrates her plans. Ofelia continues with her lies and defamation of Carlos. Mariano begins to open his heart more and more with Constanza and they end up kissing each other. Carlos and Patricio decide to stop Ofelia after defaming Carlos and messing with the image of Patricio’s mother. Luz is very happy to see her wedding dress. Luz and Jesús celebrate their bachelorette and bachelor parties. Lalo will present a dish for Carlos and Patricio.
72	"Quiero cambiar"	1 June 2021	2.9
Mariano confesses to Cony that he couldn't help falling in love with her and kisses her. They both cry with happiness. Mariano surprises Cony with a very romantic evening. Ofelia slanders Carlos and Regina on live television. Mariano refuses to go to his mother's wedding. The man sent by Ofelia locks Guapo, Patricio’s dog, in the bathroom and attacks Patricio. Carlos decides to confront Ofelia and the press. Everything is ready for Luz's wedding.
73	"Hasta que la muerte nos separe"	2 June 2021	3.4
Luz and Jesús get married. Mariano finds out about his mother's cancer. Carlos comes to take care of his son Patricio. Jade arrives at the wedding to spread her poison, but Regina stops her. Camila begins to feel bad. Carlos suspects that it was Ofelia who caused the attack on Patricio.
74	"Yo te voy a salvar mamá"	3 June 2021	3.3
Mariano begs Luz to fight for her life, but she does not accept and asks him to be quiet. Camila loses her baby. Lalo and Regina continue to suffer for their relationships. Federica tells Regina to fight for Patricio's love. Jade informs the Astudillos that Camila had an abortion. Ofelia decides to take Alan away but Carlos stops her and defends him. Mariano apologizes to his siblings and asks them to be siblings again.
75	"Voy a dar la batalla"	4 June 2021	3.1
Ponchita confronts Violeta. Cony gets fed up and confronts her mom to tell the truth, but her mom humiliates her. Regina looks for Patricio to clear things up. Luz agrees to follow Mariano's treatment. Regina fights for the love of Patricio. Ofelia catches Sol with Alan and a fight between the two begins again. Lalo wants Sol, Alan and him to achieve their goals. Esteban supports Mariano. Ofelia will now remove Carlos from her path.
76	"Ser fuertes"	7 June 2021	2.9
Esteban is seriously injured after a motorcycle accident. Ponchita believes that Violeta approached the Ruedas to acquire the lands of Luz. Luz and Jesús ignite the passion. Esteban could be paralyzed. Violeta assures Ofelia that if she caused Esteban's accident, she will spend her days in prison. Ofelia try to make Carlos feel bad about Esteban's accident.
77	"Nadie muerde a quien le da de comer"	8 June 2021	3.4
Carlos assures that Ofelia is lying, confirms their divorce and her dismissal from the company. Mariano confesses to Luz that Constanza's pregnancy is fake, since he is sterile. Jesús reveals to Luz the reasons why his sister did not follow the good path. Ofelia is furious when she knows that Regina may have an important position in the company. Violeta and Ofelia have a strong confrontation after discovering each others secrets. Luz confronts Violeta for having faked Cony's pregnancy and blames her for everything that has happened to her family. Regina and Patricio want to make up for lost time.
78	"Cargar cruces"	9 June 2021	3.5
Violeta assures Luz that the sale of her house and business cannot be stopped; Luz enrages and slaps her. Jade announces to Patricio that she will be looking to be Cklass's new creative director. Regina and Patricio go on a business trip after having a romantic dinner and forgiving each other for their mistakes. Violeta declares war on Ofelia. Luz asks Mariano to tell Cony the truth. Luz remembers and apologizes to Mariano for his stormy childhood with his father. Alan feels sad about Sol's rejection.
79	"¡Ya no más!"	10 June 2021	3.2
Knowing everything that Violeta did, Ponchita does not remain silent and goes against her but Violeta takes out her street side and chaos breaks out. Cony discovers Mariano's deception and decides to get away from him and the Astudillos forever. Mariano receives bad news from Luz's analysis.
80	"Sentencia de muerte"	11 June 2021	3.4
Ofelia looks for Alan in his restaurant, but when she sees Sol, she tells her that she ruined her work on her video channel and after being insulted Ofelia slaps Sol, but Sol responds in the same way. Mariano is forced to tell his mother that her cancer is in a very advanced stage and asks her to fight for her life. Ofelia manages to have information about Violeta and blackmails her with it. Luz seeks to fix things with Regina and when she knows that her daughter and Patricio have settled down, she becomes happy and asks her to fight for her love. Meanwhile, Constanza talks with Regina about what happened with Mariano and is determined to start a new life without thinking about love.
81	"Sana convivencia"	14 June 2021	3.6
Violeta decides not to take away Luz’s property. Ofelia wants to fire Sol and Lalo, but Alan won't allow it. After discovering Mike’s erotic videos, Federica decides to separate from him. Mariano looks for Cony to apologize, but she asks for a divorce. Luz tells Jesús that she is in the terminal stage, Sol listens and suffers for Luz. Sol talks to Mariano about Luz's cancer and he asks her to keep quiet. Mariano and Lalo go out for a run, but are attacked by Ofelia's orders.
82	"Un bebé en camino"	15 June 2021	3.6
Ofelia sends some men to hurt Lalo and Mariano, both of them manage to get away safely. Regina has her date with Patricio, where she is nauseous. Lalo wants to start with Sol from scratch and with a kiss they decide to give themselves a chance. Violeta manages to open her heart and takes out all her courage in therapy with Jesús. Regina takes a pregnancy test and it comes out positive. Jade humiliates Cony, but she defends herself. Through an ultrasound, the doctor confirms that Regina is pregnant.
83	"¡Estamos esperando un bebé!"	16 June 2021	3.8
Ponchita wants to leave the house and Luz suffers from her sister's decision. Patricio and Regina are happy with the news that they will be parents very soon. Patricio names Regina as the new creative director and Jade accuses them of favoritism. Ofelia and Carlos are divorced. Ofelia gives order for Sol to be kidnapped and Fulgencio begins to have a bad feeling. Regina tells Luz and her aunt Ponchita that she is the new creative director of the company.
84	"Con el alma en un hilo"	17 June 2021	3.8
Ofelia enjoys seeing Sol kidnapped and asks her accomplices to do whatever they want with her. Sol's kidnapping is broadcast live and the entire Rueda family is distressed. Constanza cuts her hair to put her past behind her and close cycles. Lalo, Mariano and Patricio decide to go to Sol's rescue, but the kidnappers try to kill Lalo and Mariano is shot in the arm. Ofelia is enraged when she sees that her plan did not go the way she wanted.
85	"¡Voy a ser abuela!"	18 June 2021	3.3
Regina and Patricio announce to the whole family that they are expecting a baby, Luz is very happy to know that she will be a grandmother. Ofelia discovers Violeta's true identity and demands that she be accomplices or she will reveal the whole truth to Esteban. Lalo and Sol are happy to be together. Patricio surprises Regina with the first gift for their baby. Violeta assures Ofelia that she knows the dark secret she keeps and with what she has in her power. Luz announces to her children that she will withdraw the lawsuit.
86	"¡Nos vamos a casar!"	21 June 2021	3.5
Luz and Ponchita fight again for their separation. Jade attacks Cony and finds out that Regina is pregnant. Regina and Patricio propose marriage at the same time; they both say yes. Jade will not allow Regina to be a mother and tries to run her over, but Federica and Mike are the ones to get run over while saving Regina.
87	"Van a ser papás de una niña"	22 June 2021	3.6
The ultrasound shows that Regina and Patricio will be the parents of a girl who they will name Luz. Cony gives Mariano the signed divorce documents, but he begs her to give him another chance. Ofelia is furious when she finds out that Alan left Sol and Lalo in charge of the restaurant. Sol suffers when she sees Luz very ill and tells her that she already knows about her condition. Mariano unburdens himself with Lalo about his divorce with Constanza.
88	"La fuerza del corazón"	23 June 2021	3.7
Jade and Ofelia prepare a cruel and ruthless surprise for Regina. Sol and Lalo talk about waiting to have their first time. Regina confronts Jade for ruining her dress; Jade insults her and Cony and Sol come to Regina's defense. Luz makes Patricio carry sacks as the last test. Ofelia, Jade and Violeta threaten to reveal each others secrets or hurt each other. Regina wants to cancel the wedding, but Luz convinces her to go ahead with the wedding.
89	"El último beso de solteros"	24 June 2021	3.6
Regina is surprised to receive the wedding dress from Patricio. Ofelia accepts that Sol and Lalo stay in the restaurant, but she will give them a boss. Regina, Lalo, and Mariano go out for tacos and bond as siblings. Cony begins to be intimidated by Iván. Regina and Patricio are ready to unite their lives before God, and Luz can't wait. Ofelia continues with her plans to destroy the wedding and Iván is her accomplice.
90	"¡Arriba los novios!"	25 June 2021	3.9
Regina and Patricio finally get married and begin to enjoy the party with their entire family. Ofelia continues with her plan to end the wedding. Patricio’s life is in danger when he is poisoned. Regina is upset to learn that her husband was kidnapped. Jesús confronts Jade for messing with his family. Carlos demands Ofelia to tell him where Patricio is.
91	"Tu muerte será una tortura"	28 June 2021	3.6
Regina threatens Jade with killing her if she does not reveal where Patricio is and Jade tells her that she should ask Ofelia. Carlos pleads with Ofelia to tell him the whereabouts of his son, but she only makes fun of him. Regina confronts Ofelia too, but denies everything and finds out that Jade betrayed her. Patricio is alive, but discovers that Ofelia and the kidnappers plan to finish what they started. Jesús hires a private detective and decides to go in search of Patricio.
92	"¡Yo no maté a Jade!"	29 June 2021	3.8
Jesús goes in search of Patricio, confronts the kidnappers and with the help of Carlos they manage to rescue Patricio. Someone shoots Jade and Regina is found next to her lifeless body; the police arrest her for believing her guilty of Jade's murder. Ofelia makes an unexpected visit to Patricio at the hospital.
93	"Yo soy el asesino de Jade Castillo"	30 June 2021	3.2
Luz visits Regina in jail and offers all her support to her daughter. Patricio learns that his wife is in custody. Patricio pleads guilty to Jade's murder to save Regina and Luz thanks him for the greatest gesture of love by sacrificing himself. Lorena continues to make life impossible for Sol. Ofelia in her program discredits the image of Jesús.
94	"Hasta que la muerte nos separe"	1 July 2021	3.8
Ofelia threatens Violeta with a gun. Lorena reveals to Lalo that likes him and kisses him. Luz reveals to Ponchita about her illness. Ponchita suffers knowing that her sister is dying. Violeta confesses to Constanza all about her past and Constanza questions her about Jade's death. Esteban kicks out Violeta from the house. Luz is enraged when she learns that Violeta was the culprit in the fire at the rotisserie and asks her to leave her house. Sol confronts Lorena for kissing Lalo.
95	"Hacer justicia"	2 July 2021	3.3
Violeta faces Ofelia for revealing the truth to Esteban; Ofelia teases her and Violeta becomes enraged and ends up pulling her teeth. Violeta denounces that Ofelia del Olmo is the real murderer of Jade Castillo and tells how she killed her. Patricio is released and is reunited with his family. Violeta returns to the neighborhood after being alone and comes across her version of the past. Ofelia hurts Rosalba's face. Luz tells Patricio that she loves him.
96	"Te perdono, Mariano"	5 July 2021	3.4
Sol and Lalo spend a romantic night and they both indulge in love. Mariano and Constanza kiss; she agrees to forgive him and he vows to win her back. Ofelia attacks again by poisoning Rosalba in order to strip her of all her money. Patricio defends Sol. Luz gives Lalo the keys to 'Mama Gallina' so that he can take the business to a better future Constanza is drugged by Iván, so he can take her by force.
97	"Nunca debí haber nacido"	6 July 2021	3.9
Iván drugs Constanza and tries to rape her, but Regina, Sol and Federica run to her aid. Regina takes a heavy blow in the confrontation and puts her baby's life in danger. The police arrest Iván for attempted abuse against Cony. Luz scolds Lalo for failing to deliver the food and strips him of ‘Mama Gallina’. Constanza suffers when she learns that Luz is sick. Lalo decides to flee the house and get away from Luz, so Sol reveals Luz’s secret to make him see reason.
98	"Poner el nombre de la familia en alto"	7 July 2021	3.6
Sol mocks Lorena's absurd intentions to separate her from Lalo; Lorena slaps her, but Sol does not hold back. Lalo chooses to keep quiet and show Luz that he can handle ‘Mama Gallina’ and accepts the challenge of selling 100 chickens in one day. Luz is calm knowing that her business will be in good hands. The dance contest takes place and the party is interrupted when a disco ball falls down. Violeta confesses all the bad things she has done.
99	"Herencia en vida"	8 July 2021	4.0
Violeta apologizes for everything she did to the Rueda family. Mariano informs Luz that she has only a few days to live. Seeing that Mariano has really changed, Cony gives him a new chance at love. Luz entrusts her children with a very special trip. Violeta apologizes to Luz on her knees. Regina discovers Luz's illness and goes into labor and Patricio will have to decide between the life of his wife or that of his daughter.
100	"Algún día nos volveremos a abrazar"	9 July 2021	3.6
Ofelia orders to finish the job of getting rid of Regina's daughter and Nerón is discovered by Esteban who manages to stop him and avoid a misfortune. Jesús finds Ofelia's hiding place and looks for her to confront her, soon Violeta arrives to help him, but Ofelia manages to escape with the help of Catalino. Regina and Patricio arrive home together with their daughter whom they receive with much love. Cony confesses that she wants to be a mother and Mariano, encouraged, asks her to marry him again. After knowing that she has only a few days to live, Luz and Patricio go out for a talk and she asks him to be the mainstay of the family after her death and never betray Regina. On the way home, everyone is surprised to see Luz drunk and she takes the opportunity to give a message of love to her entire family.
101	"Mi último deseo"	11 July 2021	3.8
102	"La muerte de Luz"	11 July 2021	3.8
Luz invites the whole family to her birthday party. Cony and Mariano get married. Luz manages to go to the baptism of her granddaughter Lucecita. Ofelia comes to interrupt the celebration and threatens everyone with exploding a bomb, but Violeta and the police stop her. Luz thanks Jesús for making her heart love again and takes her last breath at his side. The Rueda siblings and the whole family suffer after Luz's death. Wenceslao arrives at the funeral, but Jesús is the one who receives the support of his children. One year after Luz's death, Jesús shows the whole family a moving video that Luz recorded for all her loved ones.
