= Yacaranday =

1999 Mexican telenovela

- Created by: Patricia Romani
- Developed by: TV Azteca
- Directed by: José Acosta; Alejandro Caballero; José Caballero Betanzos
- Starring: Aylin Mujica; Jorge Luis Pila
- Theme music composer: Alejandro Cruickshank; Alejandro Zepeda
- Country of origin: Mexico
- Original language: Spanish
- No. of episodes: 70

Production
- Executive producers: Juan David Burns; Elisa Salinas
- Producers: Alejandro Gavira; Gustavo Gavira
- Production location: Mexico City
- Editor: Víctor Hugo Flores
- Camera setup: Multi-camera
- Running time: 42 minutes
- Production company: TV Azteca

Original release
- Network: Azteca Trece
- Release: 18 January – 23 April 1999

Related
- Las Dos Dianas (Venezuela, 1992)

Yacaranday is a Mexican telenovela by TV Azteca. It premiered in 1999. The protagonists are Aylin Mujica and Jorge Luis Pila.

The series was discontinued prematurely due to low ratings.

== Cast ==
- Aylín Mújica ... Yacaranday
- Jorge Luis Pila ... Adrián
- Claudio Obregón ... Don Eugenio
- Martha Verduzco ... Mercedes
- Carmen Delgado ... Cecilia
- Monserrat Ontiveros ... Rosaura
- Fabiana Perzabal ... Berenice
- Jaime Padilla ... Rani
- Roberto Cobo ... Tata Tomás
- Farnesio de Bernal ... Don Luis
- Paloma Woolrich ... Catalina
- Arturo Ríos ... Omar
- Claudia Lobo ... Laura
- René Gatica ... Teodoro
- Víctor Huggo Martin ... Juan Santiago
- Evangelina Sosa ... Margarita
- Marta Zamora ... Leonor
- Myrrah Saavedra ... Otilia
- Claudette Maillé ... Marcela
- Abel Woolrich ... Lucio
- Carlos Cobos ... Padre Domingo
- Guillermo Iván ... Timoteo
- Úrsula Murayama

== Crew ==
Creator	Jose Ignacio Cabrujas
Adaptation and Screenplay	Eric Vonn
General Producer	Rafael Uriostegui
