= Julio Jimenez (writer) =

Colombian writer

Julio Jiménez is a Colombian writer of telenovelas for RTI Colombia.

His style has been described as like that of Alfred Hitchcock. He is influenced by Agatha Christie.

== His telenovelas ==
- Bella Calamidades (2009)
- Madre Luna (2007)
- La viuda de blanco (2006)
- El cuerpo del deseo (2005)
- Pasión de Gavilanes (2003, 2022)
- Amantes del desierto (2001)
- Luzbel esta de visita (2001)
- Rauzán (2000)
- Yo amo a Paquita Gallego (1998)
- La Casa del naranjo (1998)
- La Viuda de Blanco (1996)
- Las Aguas mansas (1994)
- En cuerpo ajeno (1992)
- Profanación (1976)
- El ángel de piedra
- El cazador nocturno
- El gallo de oro
- El hijo de Ruth
- El hombre de negro
- El Virrey Solís
- Recordarás mi nombre
- La abuela
- La feria de las vanidades
- La marquesa de Yolombó
- La pezuña del diablo
- Lola Calamidades
- Los cuervos
- Los premios
- El segundo enemigo
- Por qué mataron a Betty si era tan buena muchacha
- Un largo camino
