= El Cuerpo del Deseo =

2005 American TV series

- Genre: Telenovela
- Created by: Julio Jimenez
- Starring: Andrés García; Mario Cimarro; Lorena Rojas; Martín Karpan
- Theme music composer: Abel Ibarra; Alberto Slezinger
- Opening theme: "El cuerpo del deseo" by Lorena Rojas; "Hoy te vuelvo a enamorar" by Diego Vargas
- Country of origin: United States
- Original language: Spanish
- No. of episodes: 157 (original run); 143 (international version)

Production
- Executive producers: Aurelio Valcárcel Carroll; Alejandro García
- Running time: 41–50 minutes

Original release
- Network: Telemundo
- Release: July 18, 2005 – February 28, 2006

Related
- En cuerpo ajeno (1992); Part of Me (2014); Second Chance (Ugandan adaptation); The Second Chance (Thai adaptation)

El cuerpo del deseo (lit.: The Body of Desire / English title: Second Chance) is a Spanish-language telenovela produced by Telemundo and filmed in Florida. This series is about a man who comes back from the dead and discovers dark secrets about his beautiful widow. The first version of El cuerpo del deseo was En cuerpo ajeno, produced by RTI Colombia in 1992. In India, the show was broadcast on Firangi in Hindi as Second Chance. In Pakistan, the show was broadcast on Urdu 1 with Urdu dub as Isabel – Meri Akhri Mohabbat. In the Philippines, the show was broadcast on ABS-CBN in Filipino as El Cuerpo from March 24 to November 14, 2008.

== Plot ==
The story features Pedro José Donoso (Andrés García), a wealthy old man who lives in a mansion with his daughter Angela and his servants. He falls in love with and marries a gorgeous younger woman, Isabel Arroyo (Lorena Rojas). He dies suddenly, and Isabel marries the employee Andres Corona. But Pedro Jose Donoso returns to Earth through transmigration: (the passing of a soul into another body after death), in the body of Salvador Cerinza (Mario Cimarro), a handsome (yet poor) family man. Salvador was actually a poor man who lived with his wife Cantalicia and son Moncho, but Pedro's soul forced Salvador's soul to leave Salvador's body, although Salvador hadn't died.

Pedro José searches for everything he lost, uncovering secrets, truths and deceptions. Ultimately, he must set things straight and save those who truly loved him, and reclaim the heart of Isabel. Pedro changes his name to Salvador and enters his mansion as a poor driver. Isabel feels attracted and falls in love with him. Both have sex several times and secretly Isabel kills Andres and marries Salvador. Angela marries Antonio, the maid Abigail's son. Antonio and Angela love each other very much. Pedro thinks that his death was not natural. He believes that Isabel killed him by giving him poison. Isabel did not give him poison in truth. When Isabel discovers that Salvador is Pedro, she asks him to forgive her and tells him the truth. Pedro and Isabel reunite and leave the mansion without informing anyone. However, Isabel's aunt, Miss Rebecca, believes that Salvador might have taken Isabel somewhere so that he can kill her and grab her wealth, so she and the butler, Walter, inform the police. The police chase Pedro and Isabel. Isabel tells Pedro that she doesn't want to be separated from him again, so she drives the car into a river.

Isabel dies, so Pedro's soul also leaves his body. Both souls live together and rest in peace forever. Then, the real Salvador's soul enters Salvador's body again. Isabel is buried with Pedro, and Salvador lives in Pedro's mansion for six months, but keeps on irritating everyone. Everyone finds out the truth about Pedro's transmigration and everyone is happy that Isabel and Pedro have finally reunited, but they want to get rid of the real Salvador as he was very dirty. Finally, they find Cantalicia and Moncho, and leave Salvador with him. Salvador becomes very happy. Also, Angela gives birth to a son who they name Don Pedro.

== Cast ==
=== Main ===
- Andrés García as Don Pedro
- Mario Cimarro as Salvador Cerinza / Pedro José Donoso. Main protagonist.
- Lorena Rojas as Isabel Arroyo y Aragon. Main Protagonist. Villain at first, later repents
- Martín Karpan as Andrés Corona. Villain, lover of Isabel. Hates Salvador and Pedro Jose. Attempted Isabel to poison his husband. Killed by Isabel
- Vanessa Villela as Ángela Donoso

=== Recurring ===
- Anna Silvetti as Abigail Domínguez
- Erick Elías as Antonio Domínguez
- Pablo Azar as Simón Domínguez
- Roberto Moll as Walter Franco. Butler at the Donoso family. Hates Salvador. Villain.
- Jeannette Lehr as Gaetana Charry
- Martha Picanes as Rebecca Macedo. Villain. Aunt of Isabel, materialistic and manipulative woman
- Diana Osorio as Valeria Guzmán Macedo
- Yadira Santana as Virginiana de la Santacruz / Vicky
- Rosalinda Rodriguez as Cantalicia Muñeton
- Eduardo Serrano as Felipe Madero
- Emanuel Castillo as Salvador Alonso 'Moncho' Cerinza
- Sabrina Olmedo as Matilda Serrano
- Arianna Coltellacci as Consuelo Guerrero
- Sonia Noemí as Pilar
- Michelle Jones as Paola Jiménez
- Carmen Olivares as Fatima
- Silvestre Ramos as Camilo

=== Guest ===
- Alcira Gil as Doña Lilia
- Anthony Álvarez as Ramon
- Félix Loreto as Doctor Duarte
- Lis Coleandro as Nina Macedo de Arroyo. Isabel's mother, villain. Dies
