= List of El Clon characters =

El Clon is an American television series created by Brazilian writer Glória Perez, and is broadcast by Telemundo. The following is a character list for the Telemundo telenovela El Clon (Hispanic Version).

== Cast and characters ==
=== Main cast in order of appearance ===
==== Original main cast ====
Actor	Character(s)	Descriptions
Mauricio Ochmann	Lucas Ferrer	Protagonist in love with Jade, Diego's twin, Leonardo's son,
Mauricio Ochmann	Diego Ferrer	Lucas' twin
Mauricio Ochmann	Osvaldo Daniel	Lucas' clone, in love with Jade
Sandra Echeverría	Jade Mebarak	Protagonist in love with Lucas. Has a daughter with Said.
Saul Lisazo	Leonardo Ferrer	Father of Lucas and Diego, in love with Cristina
Roberto Moll	Augusto Albieri	Fertilization scientist, Godfather of Diego Ferrer, created Daniel
Geraldine Zivic	Christina Miranda	On and off relationship with Leonardo, had a one night stand with Diego
Andrea López	Marisa Antonelli	Was interested with Diego but later became the wife of Lucas
Juan Pablo Raba	Said Hashim	Brother of Mohamed and Nazira, Ex-Husband of Jade. Has a daughter with Jade
Daniel Lugo	Ali Rashid	Uncle of Jade and Latiffa, Albieri's friend
Lucy Martínez Tello	Mamá Rosa	Nanny of Diego, Lucas and Natalia
Carlos Barbosa Romero	Abdul	Uncle of Mohammed, Nazira and Said
Luz Estella Luengas	Zoraida	Maid and housekeeper of Ali, helps Jade frequently
Mijail Mulkay Bordon	Mohamed Hashim	Brother of Said and Nazira, Husband of Latiffa
Andrea Montenegro	Nazira Hashim	Elder sister of Mohamed and Said
Carla Giraldo	Latiffa	Cousin of Jade, Mohamed's wife,
Pedro Telemaco	Osvaldo Medina	On and off boyfriend of Dora
Indhira Serrano	Dora Encarnación Padilla	Surrogate mother of Daniel
Abel Rodríguez	Enrique "Ricky" Monsalve	Leonardo's best friend, lawyer
Alexander Rodríguez	Julio	Albieri's assistant
Estefanía Gómez	Victoria "Vicky"	Dora's and Christina's best friend

==== Special participations in order of appearance ====
Actor	Character(s)	Descriptions
Roberto Manrique	Alejandro "Snake" Cortes	Natalia's boyfriend, a boxer
Laura Perico	Natalia Ferrer Antonelli	Daughter of Lucas and Marisa, in love with Alejandro
Gary Forero	Pablo	Alejandro's friend and trainer, works at the gym
Liliana Gonzalez	Clara	Raul's wife, Fernando's mother, receptionist at Leonardo's office
Cristian Tappan	Raul Escobar	Clara's husband, Fernando's father, works at Albieri's lab
Victoria Gongora	Lucia	wife of Roberto, mother of Andrea, Obsessed with her husband
Didier van der Hove	Roberto	Husband of Lucia, father of Andrea, works for Leonardo
Linda Lucia Callejas	Doña Gloria	mother of Alejandro, owner of Gloria's
Sara Corrales	Karla Perez	Hilda's daughter, Alejandro's ex-girlfriend
Luly Bossa	Doña Hilda	Karla's mother
Tiberio Cruz	Zein	friend of Said, owner of a new club called "Salamandra", New husband of Jade
Adriana Romero	Luisa	Secretary and wife of Albieri
Sandra Beltrán	Alicia	"niece" of Luisa, works at Albieri's clinic, Raul's girlfriend
Majida Issa	Rania	second wife of Said
Mara Echevery	Dr. Silvia Valencia	worked in Albieri's clinic, Good friend of Dora
Naren Daryananí	Micheal Gonzalez	owner of the gymnasium
Carlos J. Vega	Najib	Nazira's husband-to-be (one episode only)

=== Secondary cast in order of appearance ===
Actor	Character(s)	Descriptions
Carmen Marina Torres	Doña Estella Cardona	mother of Dora
Juan David Agudelo	Fernando Escobar	son of Raul and Clara, Andrea's and Natalia's best friend
Monica Uribe	Andrea del Valle	daughter of Roberto and Lucia
Valeria Chagüí	Khadija	Daughter of Jade and Said
Daniela Barrios	Samira	Daughter of Mohammed and Latiffa
Santiago Sanchez	Amin	Son of Mohammed and Latiffa
Jairo Andres Guerero	Ramon	Works at Gloria's
Fernando Perea	Miguel	Osvaldo's friend, works at the bar
Nini Yohana Pabon	Carol	lawyer, Enrique's girlfriend
Lina Urueña	Sumaya	cousin of Zamira, Amin and Khadija
Jeimy Ramirez	Anita	Luisa's friend, replaced Alicia at Albieri's clinic
Herman Sanchez	Pedro	Pablo's friend at the gymnasium, Vicky's boyfriend
Diana Mendoza	Diana	Pablo's friend at the club
Leonardo Acosta	Rogelio	Christina's old friend, works for Zein
Santiago Gomez	Carlos	Zamira's boyfriend
Paula Barreto	Amalia Santos	Leonardo's girlfriend
Guillermo Villa	Padre Andres	Albieri's friend
Juliana Posso	Amina	Rania's sister
Andrea Ribelles	Paula Acosta	friend Fernando and Natalia, a drug addict
Magdiel Rojas	Norma	friend of Cristina, Dora and Vicky
Sandra Huertas	Karima	one of Ali’s maids
Omar Antonio Gonzales	Jaime	driver of The Ferrers
Juan Jacob Isaza		worker at Ali’s house
Antonio Jimenez	Martinez	police officer
Fabio Enrique Camero	Pelaez	Police Inspector
Alfonso Rojas	Armando Ramos	Detective
Juan Manuel Diaz	Felipe Manrique	son of Raul's friend
Claudia Torres	Consuelo	Friend of Karla and Hilda, cleaner of Del Valle's house
Consuelo Moure		Lucas' friend at the beach
Zoraida Duque		Jade's mother
Carolina Ramos		
Eliana Salazar		
Yaneth Aldana		
Angie Acuesta		
Nicolas Nuñez		
Veronica Ramirez	Marina	maid at Ferrer's
Edwin Chavarriaga		
Daniel Santos		
Caterine Galindo		
Juan Carlos Restrepo		
Alfredo Esper		Enrique's consultant
Cristina Garcia	Marian	Said's housekeeper
Rocio Mora	Rosario	Hilda's friend, cleaner at del Valle's
Santiago Miniño		
Carolina Vasco		
Luis Galeano		Alejandro's competitor in the boxing competition
Walter Silva		
Juan Carlos Perez		
Olga Lucia Rojas		Dora's gynecologist
David Cantor		guy 1 at the rehabilitation clinic
Rafael Rivera		guy 2 at the rehabilitation clinic
Luced Bernuiz		girl 1 at the rehabilitation clinic
Julia Marin		girl 2 at the rehabilitation clinic
Henry Prieto		
Leonardo Florez		Jade's doctor
Julio Cesar Gaviria		
Juan Sebastian Tibata	Jamil	Boy at Khadija's party
Alejandro Garcia		
Mauricio Goyeneche		drug dealer
Felipe Vallejo	Juan	drug dealer
Maria Luisa Castro		woman robbed by Paula
Fernando Corredor		Natalia's doctor
Julio Suarez		Clara's guard
Orlando Bonell	Villegas	
Jesus Ospina	Yasser	
Jordana Issa_{sister of Majida Issa}	Zulaikha	daughter of Yasser, from Lebanon
Isabella Miranda	Aimee	Khadijah's friend
Edilberto Rivera	Farid	Latiffa's cousin
Ingrid Sarmiento		
Soledad Rodriguez		Dora's lawyer
Miguel Carballo		robbery planner
Patricia Casalini		Paula's mother
Ricardo Saldarriaga	Anibal Montaner	Judge in Daniel's case
Wilson Gomez		debtor in episode 177
Edgar Duran		drug dealer in episode 177
Javier Cardozo		Natalia's doctor
Martha Calderon		Khadijah's nanny
Mauro Urquijo		Marisa's new boyfriend
Maria Isabel Arango		Fernando's Judge
Johara Vazquez	Monica	Enrique's daughter
Daniel Diaz	Ricardo	Enrique's son
Pedro Rendon	Aurelio	Alicia's ehusband

== Theme songs ==
=== "El Velo Del Amor" ===
As the opening theme- YouTube

Performers

- Mario Reyes "The Gipsy Man"
- Sandra Echeverria

=== "Ana Baddy" ===
Theme for Jade and Lucas

Performer

- Mario Reyes "The Gipsy Man"

=== "Laily Lail" ===
Theme for Jade and Said

Performer

- Mario Reyes "The Gipsy Man"
- Carol Samaha (Arabic singer)

=== "Quedate Conmigo" ===
Theme for Leonardo and Christina

Performer

- Mario Reyes "The Gipsy Man"

=== "Habibi Kilo Kilo" ===
Theme for Mohamed and Latiffa

Performer

- Mario Reyes "The Gipsy Man"

=== "Ma Titrikny" ===
Random theme

Performer

- Mario Reyes "The Gipsy Man"

=== "Amor Verdadero" ===
Dance theme

Performer

- Maury Rodriguez

=== "Mustafa" ===
Theme for Nazira, Samira, Amin and Khadija

Performer

- Mario Reyes "The Gipsy Man"

=== "Yo Quiero Mas" ===
Random Theme

Performer

- Mario Reyes "The Gipsy Man"
- Malikah
- Gerson

=== "Ba negah aval" ===
Song in Persian version

== Crew ==
Adaptation and screenplay

- Roberto Stopello
- Sandra Velasco

Art direction

- Gabriela Monroy

Costume designer

- Manuel Guerrero

Makeup

- Alfredo Salamanca

Lighting

- Margarita Castilla

Graphic Design

- Franyell Pinto
- Claudia Rodriguez
- David Durán

Cinematography

- Gilberto Castillejo
- Jorge Parra

VP of Talent

- Joshua Mintz

Writers Department Director:

- Roberto Stopello

Photography direction

- Eduardo Carreño
- Alfredo Zamudio

Camera directors

- Cesar Contreras
- Felipe Sastoque

Music

- Hector Cardona Jr.

Editor

- Alba Merchan Hamann

Original music

- Nicolas Uribe
- Oliver Camargo
- Jose Carlos Maria

Opening theme "El Velo Del Amor" performed by

- Mario Reyes "The Gipsy Man"
- Sandra Echeverria

Production chief

- Andres Santamaria

Directors

- Mauricio Cruz
- Agustin Restrepo

Executive producer

- Hugo Leon Ferrer

Original Story Written by

- Glória Perez

Production of

- Telemundo Studios
- RTI Colombia

Screenplay and original format

- Rede Globo

Produced for

- Telemundo

=== Crew trivia ===
El Clon shares the same crew with other Telemundo-RTI productions such as Te Voy a Enseñar a Querer, La Tormenta, Zorro, La Traición, Doña Bárbara and Bella Calamidades.
