= Decisiones extremas =

- Created by: Perla Farías; Laura Restrepo
- Developed by: Telemundo; RTI Producciones
- Directed by: Agustin Restrepo
- Starring: Alejandra Lazcano; Jonathan Islas
- Theme music composer: Marco Flores
- Countries of origin: United States; Colombia
- Original languages: Spanish; English
- No. of episodes: 21

Production
- Executive producer: Hugo León Ferrer
- Production location: Bogotá
- Camera setup: Multi-camera
- Running time: 42 minutes

Original release
- Network: Telemundo
- Release: July 18 – August 1, 2011

Related
- Los Herederos Del Monte; Flor Salvaje

Decisiones Extremas (Translated as Extreme Decisions) is a Colombian telenovela produced by the United States–based television network Telemundo and RTI Producciones. Telemundo aired the serial from Monday to Friday over about 26 weeks during the 2011 season. The Boston Herald called it "The Most Ridiculous Show of 2011".

== Cast ==
- Alejandra Lazcano
- Jonathan Islas
- Yon González
- Sofía Lama

== Episodes ==
| Prod. No. | Title | Storyboard |
|---|---|---|
| 1 | El pasado regresa | A seemingly happy marriage comes under fire when a young girl shows up claiming to be a long ago abandoned daughter. In an effort to conceal her sordid past from her husband, the wife agrees to meet with the girl and her ex-boyfriend for a paternity test. When jealousy, guilt and rage enter the picture, disaster ensues in an unexpected turn of events. |
| 2 | sexo servidor | A young male prostitute falls in love with a studious, virtuous girl after meeting her by accident. He lies about his profession in order to convince her to go on a date. But he soon finds himself caught in a dangerous web of lies and blackmail when he finds out that her sister is one of his favorite clients. |
| 3 | estúpidamente enamorada | Tragedy strikes when three young adults leave a party after drinking too much. When an innocent pedestrian is run down in the street the teens decide to try to make a getaway. But life has other plans and one of them must pay the price. |
| 4 | caza fortunas | An elderly woman in need of care at home hires a live-in nurse and her sisters. The sisters hatch a plan to use the old woman’s house to try and lure millionaire husbands. Things get complicated when the neighbors suspect that something odd is going on next door |
| 5 | amor criminal | A young schoolgirl has a secret online relationship with a jailed convict. When her mother finds out about her activities online, the girl is forbidden from contacting him again. The convict’s manipulation gets the best of her and the schoolgirl runs away from home because she is convinced that the convict really, truly loves her. |
| 6 | falsa inocencia | Two teenage girls get caught up in the seedy underworld of club life. Indulgence in drugs and alcohol leads the teens into a misguided obsession with a popular celebrity DJ. After a crazy night of partying, the lines between reality and fantasy become blurred. |
| 7 | la rechazada | A poor girl is bullied by the rich kids at her wealthy private school. She befriends a group of goth girls who turn to witchcraft to exact their revenge. |
| 8 | un amor para toda la vida | An actor (Mauricio Islas) is the object of Luna Maria’s obsession. She will go to great lengths to sabotage his marriage, but will she go too far? Luna Maria esta obsesionada con un actor. |
| 9 | la recompensa | A man is set up and convicted for a crime he didn't commit. Even his family doubts his innocence. Will the real culprit be brought to justice or will an innocent man pay the price? |
| 10 | mi vida por una moto | A cheating husband buys his son’s silence by buying him a motorcycle. What happens next could tear the family apart forever. |
| 11 | ¿será hereditario? | Manuel and Maria are trying to start a family. When Manuel finds out he has a mentally handicapped brother, Maria reevaluates her desire to have a child. |
| 12 | regreso al primer amor | Pancho embarks on a wild adventure in order to reconnect with his high school sweetheart. |
| 13 | pasiones humedas | When her husband leaves her alone during their beach vacation, Norma turns to a sexy lifeguard to fill her time. Things get messy when she falls in love and decides to move him into her home |
| 14 | entrenadora personal | Monica, an older physical trainer, continues to date younger man Daniel despite her friend’s disapproval. When Daniel’s meddling mother tries to break them up, will Monica let true love slip away? |
| 15 | el ruido y la furia | A deaf girl tragically loses his parents and is adopted by a new family. With a mother and an abusive father alcolica, |
| 16 | el recluta | A soldier fresh off a tour of duty, gets recruited to pose as a woman’s dead husband in exchange for a million dollars. Things start to get complicated when the soldier begins to actually fall in love with his pretend wife. |
| 17 | divorciadas | No Info About Episode |
| 18 | cuernos supervisadors | A woman frustrated and depressed about her husband's sexual incompetence, decides to hire a maid to seduce her husband. |
| 19 | crónica de un video en la web | A foolish girl lets her boyfriend film her naked. When her boyfriend posts the footage on the Internet, her video makes her a target of vicious gossip and perverts. |
| 20 | la coartada | Armando wants the best for his sons. And he would do anything to make his sons happy |
| 21 | amo de casa descarado | A wife is under the impression her husband is the perfect man. While she thinks he's at home cooking and cleaning, he's out seducing other women; including her secretary. When his wife gets suspicious, will he finally get caught red handed? |
