= Adriana Campos =

Colombian actress (1979–2015)

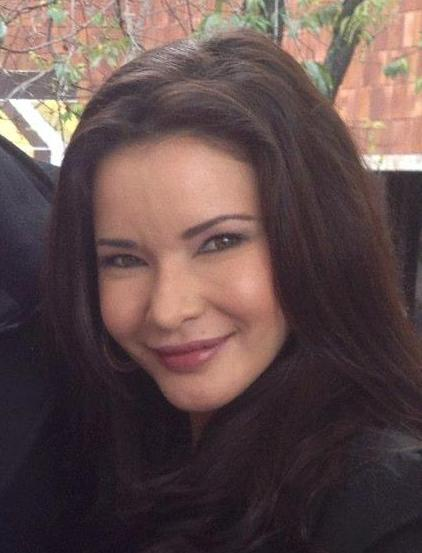
- Born: February 27, 1979; Chaparral, Tolima, Colombia
- Died: November 3, 2015 (aged 36); Salgar, Antioquia, Colombia
- Occupation: Actress
- Years active: 2000–2015

Adriana Campos (February 27, 1979 – November 3, 2015) was a Colombian actress best known for her work in television and telenovelas. She began her career in 2000, appearing in several popular series, including Se armó la gorda, Amores de mercado, and Te voy a enseñar a querer. She was also a two-time TVyNovelas Award nominee for Best Supporting Actress in Vecinos and Best Antagonist in Bella Calamidades. She died in 2015 following a car accident in Antioquia.

== Early life ==
Adriana Campos was born on February 27, 1979, in Chaparral, Tolima. She attended Colegio Manuel Murillo Toro before moving to Bogotá to study International trade, dropping out in her fifth semester. During this study, she enrolled in a workshop taught by Edgardo Román when she was 19 years old.

Her career was started in Padres e Hijos when she was 21 years old. Then, her career continue in 2000 with the role of Lucía Galán in Se armó la gorda and A donde va Soledad and Te voy a enseñar a querer (2004).

Two years later, she returned as supporting role in Amores de mercado.

== Personal life ==
In 2007, she dated Mauricio Ochmann whom she met at Victoria and was expecting a son, though she suffered a miscarriage.

== Nomination ==
She received two TVyNovelas Awards Colombia nominations as Best Supporting Actress for her role as Nicol Aguilar in Vecinos, and Best Antagonist for playing Pricila Cardona in Bella Calamidades.

== Death ==
Campos died on 3 November 2015, when her partner, businessman Carlos Rincón, lost control of the vehicle he was driving and it went into the Río Cauca in Peñalisa. within the jurisdiction of the municipality of Salgar near Bolombolo, southwest of the Department of Antioquia. The bodies of the victims were buried in the municipality of Salgar.

Her funeral took place at the Church of Nuestra Señora del Buen Consejo in northern Bogotá, followed by her burial at the Jardín Parque Cementerio Los Olivos. She is survived by one son.

== Filmography ==
Television
Year	Title	Role	Notes
2000	Se armó la gorda	Lucía Galán	Television debut
2000	A donde va Soledad	Marina Restrepo	
2001	El inútil	Jackie Ruiz	
2004	Te voy a enseñar a querer	Margarita Ángeles	
2006	Amores de mercado	Miriam "Miri" Mendizábal	
2007	El Zorro, la espada y la rosa	Yumalay Guadalupe / Toypurnia Regina	
2007	Madre Luna	Zulma Moreno	
2007	Victoria	Penélope	
2008	Tiempo final	Mara	"Día perverso" (Season 1, Episode 11)
2008	Vecinos	Nicole Aguilar	
2009	Sin retorno	Electra	Episode: "El último Show"
2010	Bella calamidades	Priscila Cardona	
