= Carmen Torres =

Carmen Torres may refer to:

- Carmen Torres (Sunset Beach), a character on Sunset Beach
- Carmen Torres (athlete) (born 1948), Filipino sprinter
- Carmen Marina Torres (1956–2015), Colombian actress
