= Amores de mercado =

Amores de mercado may refer to:

- Amores de mercado (2006 TV series), an American-Colombian television series
- Amores de mercado (Chilean TV series), a 2001 television series
