= Juan Pablo Shuk =

Colombian actor

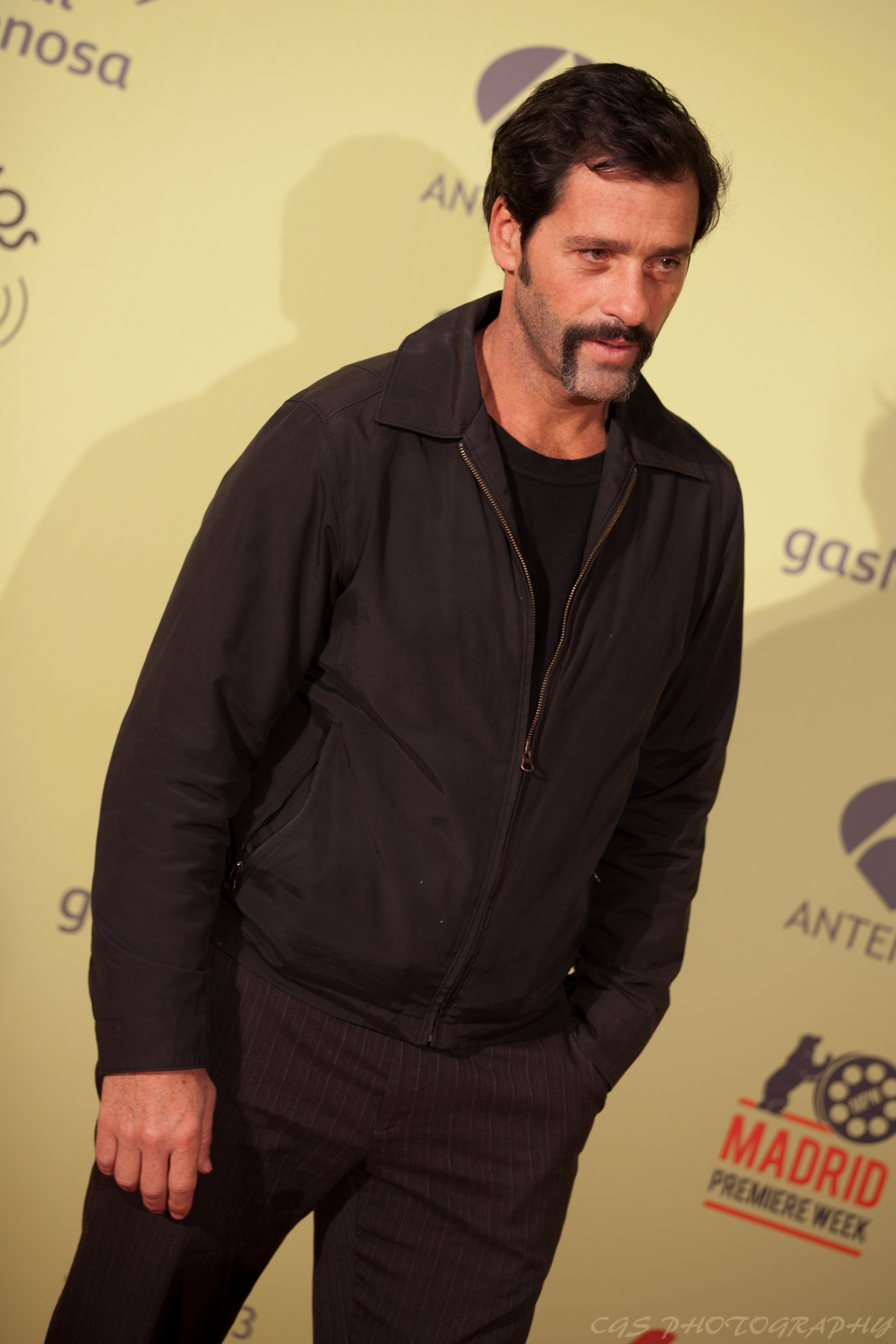
- Born: Juan Pablo Shuk Aparicio; 7 November 1965 (age 60); Bogotá, Colombia
- Occupation: Actor
- Height: 1.79 m (5 ft 10 in)
- Spouse: Ana de la Lastra

Juan Pablo Shuk Aparicio (Hungarian: Shuk Aparicio János Pál; born 7 November 1965) is a Colombian actor who lives and works in Colombia and Spain. He is married to Ana de la Lastra.

He is of Hungarian descent from his father's side, he mentions his father being born in Hungary, while his mother's family is Colombian.

He graduated in 1984 from Colegio San Carlos in Bogotá, Colombia. He also studied Marine Biology at Jorge Tadeo Lozano University.

== Filmography ==
=== Film roles ===
Year	Title	Roles	Notes
1999	El séptimo cielo	Fernando	
2003	Esmeraldero	Chucho	Documentary film
2010	Three Steps Above Heaven	Attacked man	
2011	Sexo, mentiras y muertos	Gerardo / Viviana's husband	
2011	No Rest for the Wicked	Augusto Lora	
2012	The Body	Agent Pablo	
2013	Combustion	Argentinian	
2015	Tiempo sin aire	Ferrer	
2016	Assassin's Creed	Diego / Father	
2018	Demonios tus ojos	Psychologist	
2017	Reevolution	Inspector JD	
2026	Beware Boiúna	Miguel	

=== Television roles ===
Year	Title	Roles	Notes
1988	El cacique y la diosa	Unknown role	
1995	María Bonita	Rodrigo Santos	
1997	Yo amo a Paquita Gallego	Kennet Martín	
1997	Dos mujeres	Guillermo Ángel	
1998	Castillo de naipes	Sebastián	
2001	Amantes del desierto	Bruno Salegue	
2003–2004	Pasión de Gavilanes	Fernando Escandón	Main Antagonist
2004–2005	Te voy a enseñar a querer	Juan Manuel Andrade	
2005–2006	La Tormenta	Father Damián / Cosme	
2005–2007	Decisiones	Javier	2 episodes
2006–2007	Amores de mercado	Manuel Medrano	
2008	Mujeres asesinas	Unknown role	Episode: "María, la creyente"
2008–2009	Sin senos no hay paraíso	Mauricio Contento	
2008	Doña Bárbara	Gonzalo Zuluaga	Episode: "Leyenda de fuego"
2008	Tiempo final	Carlos	2 episodes
2009	Sin retorno	Omar	Episode: "Trío de celos"
2009	Generation Y	Roberto de la Torre	
2010	Yo no te pido la luna	Fernando Sanclemente	
2011–2013	El barco	Luis Gamboa	Recurring role (seasons 1–3); 43 episodes
2014	La que se avecina	Unknown role	1 episode
2014	El laberinto de Alicia	Rafael Villegas / El Gato	
2016–2017	Narcos	Colonel Martinez	Recurring role (seasons 1–2); 9 episodes
2017	The Ministry of Time	Simón Bolívar	Episode: "Refugiados en el tiempo"
2018	Cocaine Coast	Ballesteros	6 episodes
2018	Mi familia perfecta	Miguel Ángel Vélez	42 episodes
2018–2019	Giants	Walter	5 episodes
2019	El General Naranjo	Gilberto Rodríguez Orejuela	
