= Adrián está de visita =

- Genre: Telenovela; Drama
- Written by: Julio Jiménez
- Directed by: Armando Barbosa; David Posada; Mauricio Cruz
- Starring: Walter Díaz; Margarita Ortega; María Elena Döehring; Mónica Mendoza; Lino Martone; Luis Fernando Salas
- Countries of origin: United States; Colombia
- Original language: Spanish
- No. of episodes: 104

Production
- Executive producers: Hugo León Ferrer; Martha Godoy
- Production locations: Bogotá, Colombia
- Running time: 42-45 minutes

Original release
- Network: Telemundo; Caracol Televisión
- Release: August 16, 2001 – July 27, 2002

Adrián está de visita is a Colombian telenovela was conducted in 2001 by RTI for Caracol Televisión and Telemundo.

== Cast ==
- Walter Díaz as Adrian Espino "Luzbel"
- Margarita Ortega as Karem Franco
- María Elena Döehring as Elsa Estrada
- Luz Stella Luengas as Paulina Estrada
- Oscar Corbella as Fabio Franco
- Lino Martone as Cristian Franco
- Luis Fernando Salas as Asdrubal Zamora
- Mónica Mendoza as Lucía Estrada
- Daniel Ochoa as Esteban Calderón
- Margalida Castro as Mercedes Zamora
- Claudia Rocío Mora as Begoña Zamora
- Luz Mary Arias as Beatriz
- Heidi Corpus as Magaly
- Julio del Mar as Manuel
- Lorena McAlister as Maria Paula
- Lilian Vélez as Gloria
- Carlos Villa as Dominico
- John Ceballos as Camilo
- Oscar Fernando Muñoz as Wilfred
- Astrid Hernández as Silvia
- Alberto Marulanda as Leon
- Paula Vásquez as Miss
- Sandra Guzmán as Homaira
- Efraín Londo as Ejecutivo #1
- Juan Carlos Uribe as Ejecutivo #2
- Rebeca López as Zoraida
- Pedro A. Vargas as Jardinero
- Miguel A. Velandia as Fotógrafo
- Luz Stella Jaramillo as Mamá de Lucia
- Daniela Rodriguez as Lucia
- Claudia Arroyave as Ligia Salazar
