= Tiberio Cruz =

Colombian actor

- Born: Tiberio Cruz Fortunato; December 15, 1976 (age 49); Barrancabermeja, Colombia
- Occupation: Actor

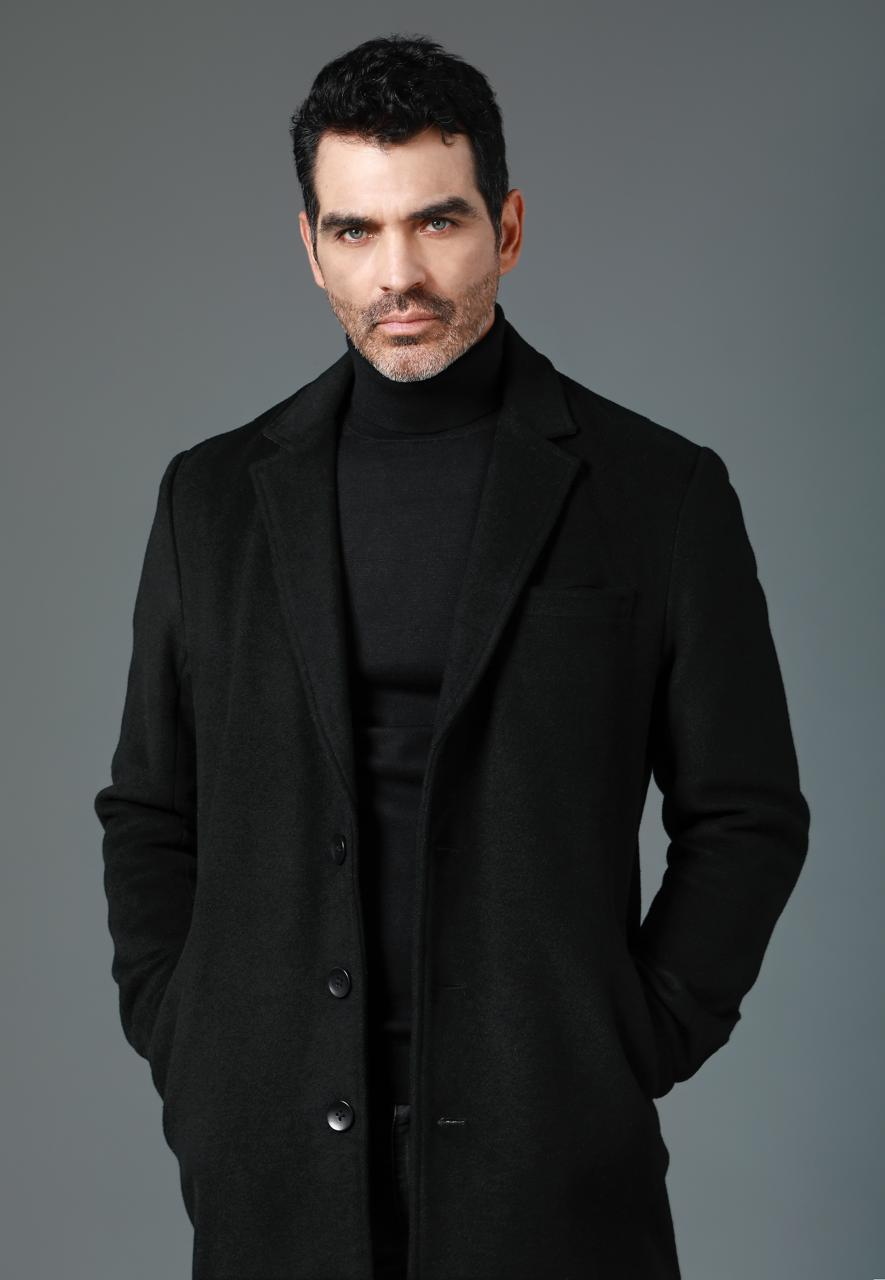
Cruz in 2022

Tiberio Cruz Fortunato (born 15 December 1976 in Barrancabermeja, Colombia) is a Colombian actor.

== Filmography ==
- 2014 - La Suegra .... Carolina López de Burgos
- 2012-2013 - El Patron Del Mal ....
- 2011-12 - Corazón de fuego .... Fernando
- 2010 - El Clon ....Zein
- 2009 - Victorinos ....Gary Estupiñan
- 2009 - Bella Calamidades ....Román Galeano
- 2008 - Doña Barbara ....Pajarote
- 2008 - La traición ....Hercules
- 2006 - Los Reyes ....Edgar Galindo
- 2003 - Amor a la plancha ....Hernán Cachón
- 1999 - Dios se lo pague ....Fredy
- 1998 - ¡Ay cosita linda mamá! ....Alex

=== Series ===
- 2007 - Zona rosa ....Julio
- 2006 - Decisiones ....José Miguel

=== Movies ===
- 2003 - Perder es cuestión de método ....Vladimir
- 2002 - Siguiendo el rastro ....

=== Reality Show ===
- 2002 - Protagonistas de Novela

=== Commercial ===
- 2003 - Speed Stick
- 2002 - Coordinadora Mercantil
- 2001 - Colcelco
- 1998 - AV Villas
- 1998 - BellSouth
