= Didier van der Hove =

Belgian-Colombian actor (born 1966)

- Born: December 13, 1966 (age 59); Brussels, Belgium
- Occupation: Actor
- Website: Didier van der Hove at IMDb

Didier van der Hove (born December 13, 1966) is a Belgian-Colombian actor.

== Early life ==
Didier van der Hove was born in Brussels, Belgium and moved to Colombia when he was 10 years old.

== Career ==
He is a telenovela actor recognized in Spain and throughout Latin America.

His popularity soared after best-selling novels such as El Zorro: La Espada y la Rosa, La tormenta and Pasion de Gavilanes.

In 2008 he became embroiled in a scandal when it was reported in Chile by the staff of the hotel where he stayed, for having sex with his partner, a minor. Chilean law has not matched the age of sexual consent, which remains at 18, while is 14.

== Filmography ==
=== Telenovelas ===
- 2014 - El Capo ....Pavel Asimov
- 2014 - El corazón del océano ....Francisco Becerra
- 2014 - La ronca de oro ....Mauro Guerra
- 2013 - La Madame ....Diego
- 2013 - Mamá También ....Pablo
- 2012 - "La prepago"...Patrick Mackensie
- 2011 - Los Herederos Del Monte ... Eulterio
- 2010 - El Clon ....Roberto Del Valle
- 2009 - Bella Calamidades ....Javier Canal
- 2009 - Niños Ricos, Pobres Padres ....Cesar Alarcón
- 2008 - Sin senos no hay paraíso ....Alberto Quiroga
- 2008 - Doña Bárbara ....Padre de Bárbara villain
- 2007 - Zorro: La Espada y la Rosa ....Santiago Michelena villain
- 2006 - Amores de mercado ....Roberto Gutiérrez
- 2005 - La Tormenta ....Enrique Montalvo villain
- 2004 - La mujer en el espejo ....Det. Javier Rosales
- 2004 - Te Voy a Enseñar a Querer ....Rodrigo Rodríguez
- 2004 - Luna, la heredera ....Erick
- 2003 - Pasión de gavilanes ....Flavio Montaño

=== Series ===
- 2005 - Decisiones
- 2020 - NFL Rush Zone: Mundo de Guardianos Como "RZ"
