= Victoria (2007 TV series) =

2007 American TV series

- Genre: Telenovela
- Created by: Lina Uribe; Jimena Romero
- Based on: Señora Isabel by Mónica Agudelo and Bernardo Romero Pereiro
- Story by: Mónica Agudelo; Bernardo Romero Pereiro
- Directed by: Andrés Bermann; Rodolfo Hoyos
- Creative director: Piedad Arango
- Starring: Victoria Ruffo; Arturo Peniche; Mauricio Ochmann
- Music by: Miguel de Narváez
- Opening theme: "Desde que te conocí" by Alejandro Fernández and Rocío Banquells
- Country of origin: United States
- Original language: Spanish
- No. of episodes: 171

Production
- Executive producer: Hugo León Ferrer
- Cinematography: Mauricio Cadavid; Roberto Cortés
- Editors: Diego René García; Mauricio González
- Camera setup: Multi-camera
- Production companies: RTI Producciones; Telemundo Studios

Original release
- Network: Telemundo
- Release: December 4, 2007 – August 1, 2008

Related
- El Zorro, la espada y la rosa; Doña Bárbara; Mirada de mujer; Mirada de mujer, el regreso

Victoria is a 2007 telenovela produced by Telemundo and RTI Colombia. The series follows a woman who falls in love with a dashing younger man after she found out about her husband's affair. This limited-run series aired in the U.S. from December 4, 2007, replacing La Esclava Isaura. The series concluded on August 1, 2008. Filmed in Bogotá, it stars Victoria Ruffo, Mauricio Ochmann, Arturo Peniche, and Andrea López.

== Story ==
At her 25th wedding anniversary party, Victoria Mendoza (Victoria Ruffo) finds out her husband Enrique Mendoza (Arturo Peniche) has a mistress, Tatiana López (Andrea Lopez). Suddenly Victoria's whole life crashes around her as she realizes her marriage is wrecked. As she tries to heal the pain of her husband's adultery, she meets the 33-year-old Jerónimo (Mauricio Ochmann) out of the blue.

Victoria falls for this younger man, giving her a second chance at the true love and passion missing in her loveless marriage. Many of her loved ones oppose her relationship, including her daughters Paula (Geraldine Bazán) and Mariana (Laura Perico), her mother Mercedes (Margalida Castro) and her ex-husband. They blame her for the breakup. On the other hand, her son Santiago (Ricardo Abarca) offers unconditional support. Victoria has many problems but does she know she has those problems? Can she solve them? So Victoria faces a difficult decision: either fight to keep true love alive or surrender and let it slip away.

== Production ==
Victoria is a remake of Mirada de mujer (The Gaze of a Woman) [which is a remake of the lost 1993 Colombian telenovela Señora Isabel] and of its sequel, El Regreso. This show's working titles were Tiempos de Victoria (Victoria's Times), Señora Isabel and The Mauricio Ochmann Project.

The show's premiere on Telemundo reached 782,000 core adult (ages 18–49) viewers, according to NTI, and over 1.5 million total viewers overall. The expanded the series' run to about 160 chapters from the standard length, 120 shows. There was no question of announcing any plans to remake Mirada's sequel, El Regreso (The Return) as Victoria covered El Regreso (both in one). Géraldine Bazán won a Latin ACE Award for "Best Inspiring Young Actress" during her role as Paula.

== Broadcast ==
Victoria airs on Caracol TV in Colombia, on Telemundo in the United States, on Fox televizija in Serbia, on Nova TV - September 26, 2008 and Diema Family - January 5, 2009 in Bulgaria, Televisa (on Galavisión) in Mexico, on POP TV in Slovenia, on NTV Hayat in Bosnia and Herzegovina, on Acasă in Romania, from August 2009 in Slovakia on TV Doma, on Shant TV in Armenia and from August 2009 on Farsi1 EutelSat Satellite TV Channel (Farsi1 later confirmed censoring some scenes including kisses and sexual actions in order to adapt the serial to Iranian culture).

== Alternate ending ==
On August 4, 2008, Telemundo broadcast the alternate ending of Victoria through Yahoo! Telemundo. It was the first alternate ending of a Spanish Telenovela ever aired by Telemundo in the United States. The first ending was romantic; the second was realism. Victoria let Ochmann leave; then we saw her talking about how she's got everything (and doesn't need him): like her business, her grandchild, her amigas sinceras, etc. There was an off-stage third ending wherein Ochmann made a pareja with Adriana Campos ("Yumelay from Zorro"—cute little Indian), who played his middle-story girlfriend (Penelope) in Spain whom he eventually left to go back to Victoria.

== Advertisements ==
Product placements in the US version of this show include: JCPenney, T-Mobile Scrubbing Bubbles, Budweiser, Bud Light, Windex, Oust, Lysol, State Farm, Visa, Lowe's, The Home Depot, Walmart and Pledge. In some cases, Telemundo news programs can be seen or heard while characters are watching TV, even though this show is set in Bogota, Colombia.

== Cast ==
- Victoria Ruffo as Victoria Santiesteban Estrada De Mendoza / De Acosta
- Mauricio Ochmann as Jerónimo Acosta
- Arturo Peniche as Enrique Mendoza
- Andrea López as Tatiana López De Mendoza
- Roberto Manrique as Sebastian Villanueva
- Diana Quijano as Camila Matiz
- Javier Delgiudice as Gerardo Cárdenas
- María Helena Doehring as Helena De Cárdenas
- Camilo Trujillo as Arturo Cárdenas
- Margalida Castro as Mercedes "Memé" Estrada Vda. De Santiesteban
- José Julián Gaviria as Martín Acosta
- Géraldine Bazán as Paula Mendoza Santiesteban De Villanueva
- Ricardo Abarca as Santiago Mendoza Santiesteban
- Laura Perico as Mariana Mendoza Santiesteban
- Patricia Grisales as Carlota
- Adriana Romero as Valeria
- Andrés Felipe Martínez as Guillermo
- Laura Londoño as Eliza
- Ricardo González as Henry Irazábal
- Liliana Calderón as Fernanda
- Natalia Bedoya as Estrella
