= Katie Barberi =

Mexican actress

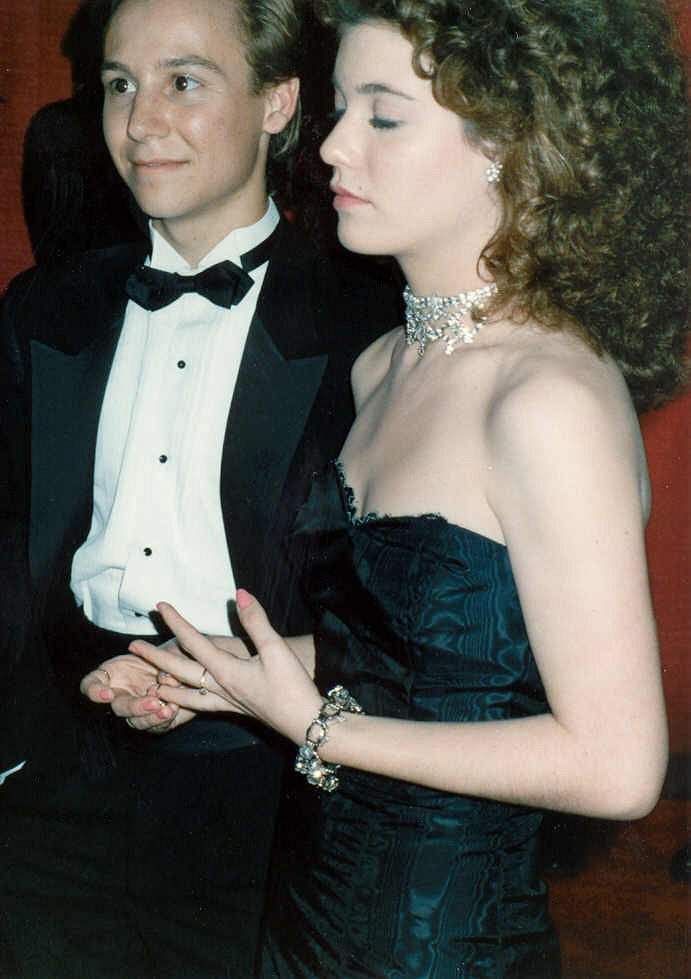
- Keith Coogan and Katie Barberi at the 61st Academy Awards in 1989
- Born: January 22, 1972 (age 54); Torreón, Coahuila, Mexico
- Occupation: Actress
- Years active: 1984–present

Katie Barberi (Spanish pronunciation: [baɾˈβeɾi]:born January 22, 1972) is a Mexican actress known for her work in telenovelas, her portrayal of Ursula de Román in Grachi and for her portrayal of Ursula Van Pelt on Every Witch Way, the American adaptation of Grachi.

== Career ==
Barberi played "Maria Delucci" in the NBC series The Bronx Zoo.

She also played "Tangerine" in the 1987 "The Garbage Pail Kids Movie". She played "Cecilia" in the 2008 version of Dona Barbara, based on the novel by Rómulo Gallegos.

== Filmography ==
=== Film ===
Year	Title	Role	Notes
1986	Ferris Bueller's Day Off	Economics Student	
1987	The Garbage Pail Kids Movie	Tangerine	
1995	Yaqui indomable	Nancy	
1997	Perdita Durango	Nancy	
2014	Reaching the Sea	Julia	Short film
2022	Power Day	President Alegria	Short film
2023	Saw X	Cancer support group leader	

=== Television ===
Year	Title	Role	Notes
1984	Kids Incorporated	Princess Luanne	Episode: "The Basket Case"
1985	It's Your Move	Michelle	Episode: "The Experts"
1985	Silver Spoons	Wanda O. Biddle	Episode: "The Secret Life of Ricky Stratton"
1986	The Judge	Amy Walsh	Episode: "Stand by Me"
1986	Divorce Court	Patty Getz	Episode: "Getz vs. Getz"
1986	All Is Forgiven	Cassie	Episode: "Mother's Day"
1986	Superior Court	Unknown role	Episode: "Bigamy 2"
1988	The Bronx Zoo	Maria DeLucci	5 episodes
1988	Beverly Hills Buntz	Toni	Episode: "A Christmas Carol"
1988	Freddy's Nightmares	Connie	Episode: "Rebel Without a Car"
1989	Not Quite Human II	Roberta	Television film
1989	Spooner	Caroline	Television film
1990	Appearances	Deanne Kinsella	Television film
1991	Us	Barb	Television film
1992	FBI: The Untold Stories	Tricia	Episode: "Buried Alive"
1995	Alondra	Rebecca Montes de Oca	
1995	Acapulco Bay	Maura	
1997	Conan	High Priestess	Episode: "A Friend in Need"
1997	Mi pequeña traviesa	Pamela	
1997	Alguna vez tendremos alas	Isabel Ontiveros de Lamas	
1997–2002	Mujer, casos de la vida real	Unknown role	4 episodes
1998–1999	El privilegio de amar	Paula	44 episodes
1999	Por tu amor	Miranda Narváez de Durán	90 episodes
2000	La casa en la playa	Florencia Uribe	
2000	Carita de ángel	Noelia	
2001	Salomé	Laura	
2003	Rebeca	Regina Montalbán de Santander	150 episodes
2004	Inocente de ti	Mayte Dalmacci Rionda	
2005	El amor no tiene precio	Engracia Alexander / La Chacala	
2007	La marca del deseo	Digna de Santibáñez	
2008–2009	Doña Bárbara	Cecilia Vergel	
2010	Bella calamidades	Silvana Barbosa de Cardona	136 episodes
2010–2011	El fantasma de Elena	Rebeca Santander de Girón	
2011–2013	Grachi	Ursula de Román	183 episodes
2011	Mi corazón insiste en Lola Volcán	Victoria "Vicky" de Noriega	122 episodes
2012	Corazón valiente	Perla Navarro	
2012	Burn Notice	Ms. Arnold	Episode: "Desperate Measures"
2013	The Arrangement	Supervisor	Television film
2014–2015	Every Witch Way	Ursula Van Pelt	63 episodes
2014	Every Witch Way: Spellbound	Ursula Van Pelt	Television special
2015	The Blexicans	Lydia	Episode: "The Blexicans"
2016	Eva la trailera	Cinthia Monteverde	85 episodes
2020	Chicago Fire	Brenda McKinney	Episode: "Shut it Down"
