= Yo no te pido la luna =

Colombian telenovela

- Genre: Telenovela
- Screenplay by: Mauricio Barreto; Andrés Huerta
- Directed by: William González
- Country of origin: Colombia
- Original language: Spanish
- No. of seasons: 1
- No. of episodes: 58

Production
- Executive producer: Manuel Peñaloza
- Production location: Bogotá, Colombia

Original release
- Network: Caracol Televisión
- Release: 3 March – 27 September 2010

Yo no te pido la luna (formerly known as Yo no soy esa) is a Colombia telenovela that premiered on 3 March 2010 on Caracol Televisión, but it was taken off the air and broadcast on Caracol Internacional. The telenovela was taken out of Caracol's programming, due to its low rating levels. It is considered one of the most "worst rating" telenovela in the history of Colombian television. The telenovela stars Anasol, and Ricardo Vélez.

== Cast ==
- Anasol as Juanita Román
- Ricardo Vélez as Alejandro Castillo
- Ángela Vergara as Tatiana Ivanova
- Talú Quintero as Elvira Castillo
- Juan Pablo Shuk as Fernando Sanclemente
- Ana María Trujillo as Soledad Castillo
- María Cristina Pimiento as Carolina Castillo
- Germán Patiño as Rodrigo Castillo
- Luisa Fernanda Giraldo as Magaly
- Santiago Cepeda as Sandro Román
- Kepa Amuchastegui as Vladimir Ivanov
- Constanza Camelo as Deyanira Dupre
- Mauricio Bastidas as Miguel
- George Slebi as Diego Colmenares
- Jéssica Sanjuán as Susana Espernancad
- Freddy Flórez as Lucas Dupre
