= Marlene Favela =

Mexican actress & model (born 1976)

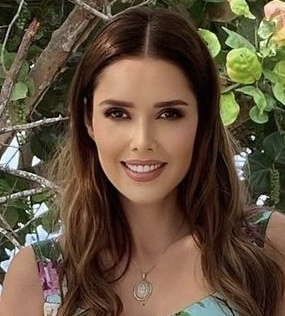
- Favela in 2022
- Born: Silvia Marlene Favela Meraz; August 5, 1976 (age 50); Santiago Papasquiaro, Durango, Mexico
- Occupations: Actress; model
- Years active: 1999–present
- Spouse: George Seely (m. 2017; div. 2020)
- Children: 1

Marlene Favela (born Silvia Marlene Favela Meraz on August 5, 1976) is a Mexican actress and model. In Mexican television, as of 2013 she was best known for her role as Esmeralda in the TV show Zorro, La Espada y la Rosa.

In 2013, she appeared as an award presenter at the Billboard Mexican Music Awards.

On December 12, 2017, Favela married George Seely at a hacienda in San Juan del Río, Querétaro, Mexico.

== Filmography ==
=== Films ===
Year	Title	Role	Notes
2007	Species – The Awakening	Azura	
2008	Playball	Elena	

=== Television ===
Year	Title	Role	Notes
1995	María José	Deborah	
1997	María Isabel	Patricia	
1998	Perla		Guest role; 1 episode
1999	Mujeres engañadas	Leticia	
1999	Por tu amor	Mónica	
1999	Infierno en el paraíso	Patricia	
2000	DKDA: Sueños de juventud	Gina	
2000	La casa en la playa	Malena Núñez	
2000	Carita de ángel	Ámbar Ferrer	
2001	La intrusa	Guadalupe Rosas	
2001	Navidad sin fin	Cuquis	
2002	Entre el amor y el odio	Cecilia Amaral	
2002-2003	Gata salvaje	Rosaura Ríos	Main cast
2003	Velo de novia	Angeles Villaseñor	Guest star
2004	Rubí	Sonia Chavarría González	
2005	Contra viento y marea	Natalia Ríos Soler	
2006	Ugly Betty	Sister Eva / Esmeralda	5 episodes
2007	El Zorro, la espada y la rosa	Esmeralda Sánchez de Moncada	
2007	Amor sin maquillaje	Josefina "Pina" Cárdenas	
2011	Los herederos del Monte	Paula del Monte	
2011	Corazón apasionado	Patricia Campos Miranda	
2012-2013	El rostro de la venganza	Alicia Ferrer / Eva Samaniego	
2014	El Señor de los Cielos	Victoria Navárez "La Gober"	Season 2; 65 episodes
2014	Jane the Virgin	Best Supporting Actress	"Chapter Nine" (Season 1, Episode 9)
2015-2016	Pasión y poder	Ernestina "Nina" Pérez de Montenegro	Main cast; 137 episodes
2016	Nuestra Belleza Latina 2016	Herself	Guest role; 1 episode
2019	Por amar sin ley	Mónica Almazán	Guest role; 6 episodes
2021	La desalmada	Leticia Lagos de Toscano	Main cast
2023	El amor invencible	Columba Villareal	Main cast
2023	Amores que engañan	Fabiola	Guest role; 1 episode
2023	El maleficio	Beatriz de Martino	Lead role
2025	Me atrevo a amarte	Deborah Méndez	Main cast
2026	El renacer de Luna	Dalila Mondragón	Main cast

== Awards and nominations ==
=== Premios ACE ===
Year	Category	Telenovela	Result
2007	Best TV Scene Actress	Zorro, la Espada y la Rosa	Won

=== Premios El Heraldo de México ===
Year	Category	Telenovela	Result
2002	Best Actress Revelation	La Intrusa	Nominated

=== Premios TVyNovelas ===
Year	Category	Telenovela	Result
2002	Best Co-star Actress	La Intrusa	Nominated

=== Miami Life Awards ===
Year	Category	Telenovela	Result
2013	Best Actress Villain	El rostro de la venganza	Nominated
2014	6th People en Español Awards - Best Actress	El Señor de los Cielos	Nominated
