= Danna García =

Colombian actress and model

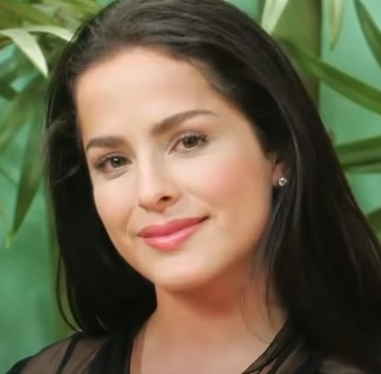
- Born: Danna María García Osuna; Medellín, Colombia
- Other name: Dannita
- Occupations: Actress, model
- Years active: 1987–present
- Children: 1
- Website: www.dannagarcia.com

Danna María García Osuna is a Colombian actress and model best known for playing main roles in telenovelas in Colombia, Mexico and the US.

== Personal life ==
She has one child, born in July 2017, from her relationship with Spanish journalist Iván González.

== Filmography ==
=== Film ===
List of appearances and roles in feature films
Year	Title	Role(s)	Note(s)	Source(s)
2010	Toy Story 3	Barbie	Spanish dubbing	
2012	El cielo en tu mirada	Angélica María		
2012	Carrusel	María Cristina Echeverry		
2018	Malacopa	Paulina Santamaria		

=== Television ===
List of appearances in television series and specials
Year	Title	Role(s)	Note(s)	Source(s)
1987	Imagínate			
1989	Azúcar	Child Caridad Solaz		
1991	La casa de las dos palmas	Young Evangelina Herreros		
1993	La otra raya del tigre	Manuela Santacruz		
1994	Café, con aroma de mujer	Marcela Vallejo Cortez		
1995	Victoria	Victoria		
1996	El día es hoy	Milena		
1997	Al norte del corazón	Eloísa		
1998	Perro amor	Sofía Santana		
1999	Háblame de amor	Julia Toledo Saldivar/Jimena Ortega Toledo		
2000	La revancha	Soledad Santander / Mariana Ruíz		
2002	Lo que callamos las mujeres	Lety	"Amor que mata" (Season 2, Episode 36)	
2003–2022	Pasión de gavilanes	Norma Elizondo Acevedo de Reyes	259 episodes (Seasons 1-2)	
2004	Te voy a enseñar a querer	Diana María Rivera		
2005	Corazón partido	Aura Echarri Medina		
2007	Decisiones	Francisca	"Mecanismo ilusión" (Season 3, Episode 16)	
2008	La traición	Soledad de Obregón		
2008	Tiempo final	Ana	"Lesbianas" (Season 2, Episode 6)	
2008-2009	Un gancho al corazón	Valentina López "La Monita"		
2010	Bella calamidades	Dolores "Lola" Carrero		
2010	Alguien te mira	Piedad Estévez		
2012-2013	Qué bonito amor	María Mendoza de Martínez de la Garza	Nominated, Premios People en Español for Best Lead Actress; Nominated, Premios People en Español for Best Sweethearts with Jorge Salinas	
2014	Camelia la Texana	Rosa	1 episode	
2015	Lo imperdonable	Rebeca Rojo	16 episodes	
2016	Ruta 35	Sofía Bermúdez		
2016	Las amazonas	Diana Santos		
2018	Por amar sin ley	Fanny Quiroz	9 episodes	
2019-2020	El Señor de los Cielos	Violeta Estrella	63 episodes (Season 7)	
2022	Amor en Navidad	Marta Bermudez	"Una Navidad para recordar" (Season 1, Episode 2)	
2023	Amores que engañan	Ingrid	"Durmiendo con un extraño" (Season 2, Episode 1)	
2026	Hermanas, un amor compartido	Rebeca Olmos		
