= Jonathan Islas =

Mexican actor

- Born: November 15, 1981 (age 45); Mexico City, Mexico
- Occupations: Actor, model
- Years active: 2002-present
- Partner: Danna García (2010-2011)

Jonathan Christian Islas Porras best known as Jonathan Islas (born on November 15, 1981, in Mexico City, Mexico) is a Mexican actor mainly known for his roles in various telenovelas.

== Career ==
He started his acting career in theatrical shows in Colegio Anglo Americano. He later joined TV Azteca's acting school, CEFAT. In 2005, he joined Telemundo.

He currently resides in Los Angeles, California.

== Filmography ==
=== Television ===
Year	Title	Role	Notes
2002	Agua y aceite	Unknown role	Episode: "La presentación"
2003	Enamórate	El Gato	
2004	Soñarás	Martín	
2004	La heredera	Unknown role	
2004	La vida es una canción	Emiliano	Episode: "Otra vez"
2006	Amores de mercado	David Miralvez	
2009	Más sabe el diablo	Amigo de Joven Martín Acero	Episode: "Sentencia divina"
2010	Bella calamidades	Ricardo Galeano	
2010	La diosa coronada	Kevin Avarado	
2010	Ojo por ojo	Oficial de Policía	
2011	Los herederos del Monte	Lucas del Monte	
2012	Flor Salvaje	Abel Torres	
2011	A corazón abierto	Mateo	
2012–13	El rostro de la venganza	Luciano Alvarado	
2012	El Capo	Piloto	2 episodes
2013	La Madame	Jonathan	Episode: "Sandra la virgen"
2014	La impostora	Cristóbal León Altamira	
2015	Celia	Young Mario Agüero / Mario Agüero	
2015–16	¿Quién es quién?	Ignacio Echánove	
2017	La Fan	Diego Castro Romero	
2017–18	Señora Acero, La Coyote	Antonio Rivas "Tecolote"	
