= Alberto Valdiri =

Colombian actor

Alberto Valdiri (August 14, 1959 – December 20, 2014) was a Colombian actor.

Valdiri was born in Barranquilla, Colombia. His credits include comedic and dramatics roles in television series, telenovelas, theater, and more than twenty films. He appeared as Gordito González on Yo soy Betty, la fea and Francisco Mujica in the 2008 telenovela, Doña Bárbara.

Valdiri died from a heart attack in Bogotá, Colombia, on December 20, 2014, at the age of 55. He was buried in Cementerio Distrital Norte in Bogota.
