= Carmen Marina Torres =

Carmen Marina Torres (8 October 1956 – 6 October 2015) was a Colombian actress from El Charco. She was best known for her participation in various telenovelas such as Zorro, La Espada y la Rosa, La Tormenta and Telemundo's El Clon.

== Filmography ==
- 2010 – El Clon ... Estella
- 2008 – La Traición ...
- 2007 – Zorro, La Espada y la Rosa ... Dolores
- 2005 – La Tormenta ... Natividad "Nani" Esparragosa
- 2002 – Siete Veces Amada ... Esther
- 1995 – Maria Bonita ... Tona
