= María Helena Doering =

Colombian actress

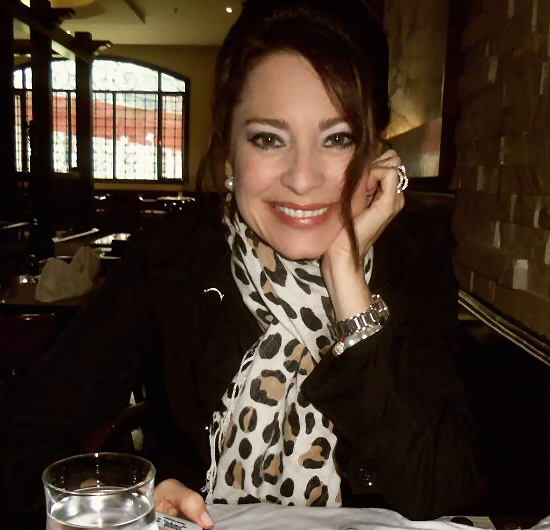
- Born: María Helena Doering Monsalve; November 16, 1962 (age 62); Cali, Colombia
- Occupation(s): Actress and model
- Spouse: Daniele Morelli (−1992),
- Website: www.mariahelenadoering.net

María Helena Doering (born November 16, 1962) is a Colombian actress and model.

Doering was born to a German-Bolivian father and Colombian mother. She studied in Colombia, London, and Italy and speaks fluent French, English, Italian and Spanish. She started her career as an actress by appearing in a Kolynos (toothpaste) commercial, and a commercial for Coffee Delight. At 13 years of age, she worked with some of the most important photographers of Cali (her hometown): Fernell Franco, Oswaldo Lopez, Micky Calero and Jaime Andres Orozco. In 1980 she traveled to Italy and stayed there for 13 years. In 1986 she was discovered by an Alfa Romeo executive while working as a translator at a Fiat event, and joined the Fashion Models Agency in Milan She worked in Italy with fashion Photographers as Gabriele Balestra and Gaetano Mansi. Doering appeared in 67 television commercials in five years and worked in Japan, Germany, Spain and France. In 1993, she was contacted by Julio Sanchez Cristo to star in La Maldicion del Paraiso in Colombia.

She is now a successful actress in her home country.

Aside from acting and modeling, Doering also sings, but not as a professional. During her free time she likes to do floral arrangements, ride horses and read biographies and books about history. She is fascinated by Italian literature.

== Filmography ==
=== Films ===
- Mi abuelo, mi papá y yo (2005)...Esperanza Arias
- El Escritor de Telenovelas (2011)... Anabella
- La Luciernaga (2013)... Mercedes
- Todas Para Uno (2014)
- Mariposas Verdes (2017)... Ana

=== Telenovelas ===
- La Ley del Corazón 2 (2018)
- Sitiados 2 (2017)
- Venganza / Revancha (2016)... Victoria Piedrahita
- Pobres Rico (2012)... Ana María Fernández de Rico
- La Pola-Amar La Hizo Libre (2010)...Eusebia de Valencia (RCN)
- Bella Calamidades (2009)...Lorenza de Machado (Telemundo)
- El penúltimo beso (2008/2009)...Lupe Preciado de Izquierdo (RCN)
- Victoria (2007)...Helena de Cárdenas (Telemundo)
- Hasta que la plata nos separe (2006)...Rosaura Suárez de De la Peña (RCN)
- Decisiones (2005)...various characters
- La Saga, Negocio de Familia (2004)... Marlene (Caracol TV)
- Te Voy a Enseñar a Querer (2004)...Isabel de Mendéz/Orquídea (Telemundo)
- La Venganza (2002)...Helena Fontana Viso (Telemundo)
- Milagros de Amor (2002)...Catalina Pizarro de Hansen (RCN)
- Adrian (Luzbel) Esta de Visita (2001)...Elsa Estrada de Franco (Telemundo)
- La viuda de Blanco (1996)...Alicia Guardiola Vda. de Blanco
- Amor, Amor (1995)...?
- Las Aguas Mansas (1994)...Melissa Ferrer
- La Maldicion del paraiso(1993)...Camila Fontana

=== Teatro ===
- La Ratonera (2002/2003)
- Técnicas para Amar(2017)...Dora
