= Bella calamidades =

- Poster
- Created by: Julio Jiménez (original story); Iván Martínez Lozano
- Directed by: Mauricio Cruz ^{till episode 30} Agustín Restrepo ^{till episode 30} Rodolfo Hoyos ^{from episode 31} Santiago Vargas ^{from episode 31}
- Starring: Danna García; Segundo Cernadas; Gustavo Angarita; Katie Barberi
- Theme music composer: Nicolás Uribe; Oliver Camargo; José Carlos María
- Opening theme: No Me Dejes performed by Paola Vargas and David Castro
- Countries of origin: Colombia; United States
- Original language: Spanish
- No. of episodes: 140

Production
- Executive producer: Hugo León Ferrer
- Producers: Andrés Santamaría ^{till episode 30} Madeleine Contreras ^{from episode 31}
- Production locations: Bogotá, Subachoque, Simijaca, Villa de Leyva
- Editor: José Luis Varon
- Camera setup: Multi-camera
- Running time: 42–45 minutes
- Production companies: Caracol Televisión; Telemundo Studios Miami; RTI Producciones

Original release
- Network: Caracol Televisión
- Release: 24 March – 23 November 2010
- Network: Telemundo
- Release: 16 September 2013 – 3 January 2014

Related
- Dulce Ave Negra; Mi adorable maldición

Bella calamidades (Beautiful But Unlucky) is a Spanish-language telenovela produced by RTI Producciones for Caracol Televisión and Telemundo. It is a tongue-in-cheek romance story, it features a woman plagued by bad luck.

The filming started in late 2009 and ended in 2010, and aired in Caracol TV between March 24, 2010 and November 23, 2010, but it was until September 16, 2013 when the serial debuted on Telemundo. Telemundo aired 2 hours of the serial weekdays at 12pm/11c, replacing 5 Viudas Sueltas. The series ended on January 3, 2014 with Avenida Brasil replacing it. The series stars Danna García and Segundo Cernadas.

== Plot ==
The story involves a beautiful, passionate woman named Lola, who is an outcast in a town dominated by superstition. Convinced that she brings misfortune to everyone, Lola shies away from other people. When her hiding place is discovered, she returns to her home town, when a series of freakish events inevitably lead to tragedy. Heartbroken and fearing for her life at the hands of the villagers, Lola loves hope one man's love and another's generosity change her life. No one trusts her except for the man who truly loves her.

== Cast ==
Main Cast in Order of Appearance

Actor	Character	Known as
Danna García	Dolores "Lola" Carrero Barraza / Dolores Barraza	Main heroine, daughter of José Carrero, niece of Martha Carrero, granddaughter of Aquiles Barraza, in love with Marcelo. / Lola's mother, daughter of Aquiles Barraza.
Segundo Cernadas	Marcelo Machado Cardona / Asdrúbal Machado	Main hero, in love with Lola, cousin of Priscila, Silvana's nephew / Lorenza's late husband, Marcelo's father.
Gustavo Angarita	Aquiles Barraza	Terrors Lola, Lola's grandfather, father of Dolores Barraza.
Katie Barberi	Silvana Barbosa viuda de Cardona	Priscila's mother, villain, Marcelo's auntie.
Rosemary Bohórquez	Virginia Vidal	Friend of Esperanza, obsessed with youth, villain
Tiberio Cruz	Román Galeano / Manuel Rosendo Galeano	One of Regina's oldest son, brother of Renato, Ricardo and Rene. / Regina's late husband, Román, Renato, Ricardo and René's father.
Adriana Campos	Priscila Cardona Barbosa	Marcelo's cousin, in love with him, Silvana's daughter, Lorenza's niece, villain.
Claudia Rocio Mora	Juana Palomino	Maid in Machado's house
Mimi Morales	Esperanza Capurro	Friend of Virginia, dancer in Fabián's bar, villain
Gary Forero	Fabián Poncela	Owner of the village bar "Los Gozosos"
Herbert King	Comisario Elías Romero	Captain of police in the village Horneros
Pedro Roda	Pablo Ávila	Cemetery guard, friend of Lola, Mónica's father.
Daniela Tapia	Nicolasa Fragoso	Maid in Galeano's house
María Helena Doering	Lorenza Cardona viuda de Machado	Marcelo's mother, godmother of Lola, Priscila's aunt.
Diana Quijano	Regina viuda de Galeano	Galeano's family head, mother of Román, Renato, Ricardo and René
Pablo Azar	Renato Galeano	Regina's son
Jonathan Islas	Ricardo Galeano	Regina's son
Santiago Gómez	René Galeano	One of Regina's youngest son
Rodolfo Valdes	Nacho Mendoza	Machado's workman
Alejandra Miranda	Martha Carrero	Lola's aunt, José's sister
Lina Restrepo	Felisa	Maid in Machado's house
Ximena Duque	Angelina	Marcelo's ex-girlfriend
Didier van der Hove	Javier Canal	Lola's lawyer, in love with Lola.
Ilja Rosendahl	Rudy Walpole	Silvana's friend from England and his fiancé
Joseph Abadia	Ovidio	Machado's workman
Leonardo Acosta	José Carrero	Lola's father, Martha's brother
Luis Fernando Bohórquez	Samuel	Lola's professor
Ricardo Saldarriaga	Padre Cayetano	Priest in the village Horneros
Tirza Pacheco	Custodia	Inhabitant of the village Horneros
Vilma Vera	Pánfila	Inhabitant of the village Horneros
Rey Vásquez	Don Teodoro Parrado	Owner of the village shop "Don Tedoro", Agapita's husband, Ubalda's father.
María Margarita Giraldo	Doña Agapita de Parrado	Owner of the village shop "Don Tedoro", Teodoro's wife, Ubalda's mother.
Sasha Valentina Molina	Dolores "Lola" Carrero Barraza	Young Lola

== Production ==
This show was originally planned for the 2008–2009 season. The first pilot, titled "Lola Calamidades", was filmed in 2008 with Christian Meier, Danna García, Kristina Lilley and Andrea López. Meier eventually left Telemundo to pursue other things. From the pilot's cast only García, María Helena Doering, and Tiberio Cruz appear in the series. When the filming began on August 17, 2009 Telemundo had not yet cast the male lead. Martin Karpan was suggested, but due to the lack of chemistry between two leads his participation was reconsidered. At the end was the Argentinian actor Segundo Cernadas ("Muñeca Brava" leading man) got the role.

Also, Elizabeth Gutiérrez was to play at first Priscila, but refused the role in favour of other production. The role was eventually taken by Adriana Campos.

== United States broadcast ==
- Release dates, episode name & length, and U.S. viewers based on Telemundo's broadcast.

Air Date	Number	Episode Title	Duration
September 16, 2013	001	Capítulo 1	83 minutes
September 17, 2013	002	Capítulo 2	81 minutes
September 18, 2013	003	Capítulo 3	80 minutes
September 19, 2013	004	Capítulo 4	81 minutes
September 20, 2013	005	Capítulo 5	82 minutes
September 23, 2013	006	Capítulo 6	N/A
September 24, 2013	007	Capítulo 7	N/A
September 25, 2013	008	Capítulo 8	83 minutes
September 26, 2013	009	Capítulo 9	81 minutes
September 27, 2013	010	Capítulo 10	82 minutes
September 30, 2013	011	Capítulo 11	83 minutes
October 1, 2013	012	Capítulo 12	N/A
October 2, 2013	013	Capítulo 13	N/A
October 3, 2013	014	Capítulo 14	84 minutes
October 4, 2013	015	Capítulo 15	82 minutes
October 7, 2013	016	Capítulo 16	85 minutes
October 8, 2013	017	Capítulo 17	N/A
October 9, 2013	018	Capítulo 18	84 minutes
October 10, 2013	019	Capítulo 19	N/A
October 11, 2013	020	Capítulo 20	84 minutes
October 14, 2013	021	Capítulo 21	83 minutes
October 15, 2013	022	Capítulo 22	82 minutes
October 16, 2013	023	Capítulo 23	84 minutes
October 17, 2013	024	Capítulo 24	82 minutes
October 18, 2013	025	Capítulo 25	N/A
October 21, 2013	026	Capítulo 26	82 minutes
October 22, 2013	027	Capítulo 27	82 minutes
October 23, 2013	028	Capítulo 28	84 minutes
October 24, 2013	029	Capítulo 29	81 minutes
October 25, 2013	030	Capítulo 30	83 minutes
October 28, 2013	031	Capítulo 31	81 minutes
October 29, 2013	032	Capítulo 32	81 minutes
October 30, 2013	033	Capítulo 33	83 minutes
October 31, 2013	034	Capítulo 34	82 minutes
November 1, 2013	035	Capítulo 35	N/A
November 4, 2013	036	Capítulo 36	82 minutes
November 5, 2013	037	Capítulo 37	81 minutes
November 6, 2013	038	Capítulo 38	84 minutes
November 7, 2013	039	Capítulo 39	81 minutes
November 8, 2013	040	Capítulo 40	82 minutes
November 11, 2013	041	Capítulo 41	81 minutes
November 12, 2013	042	Capítulo 42	81 minutes
November 13, 2013	043	Capítulo 43	81 minutes
November 14, 2013	044	Capítulo 44	N/A
November 15, 2013	045	Capítulo 45	81 minutes
November 18, 2013	046	Capítulo 46	82 minutes
November 19, 2013	047	Capítulo 47	82 minutes
November 20, 2013	048	Capítulo 48	82 minutes
November 21, 2013	049	Capítulo 49	82 minutes
November 22, 2013	050	Capítulo 50	83 minutes
November 25, 2013	051	Capítulo 51	81 minutes
November 26, 2013	052	Capítulo 52	82 minutes
November 27, 2013	053	Capítulo 53	N/A
December 2, 2013	054	Capítulo 54	82 minutes
December 3, 2013	055	Capítulo 55	N/A
December 4, 2013	056	Capítulo 56	N/A
December 5, 2013	057	Capítulo 57	81 minutes
December 9, 2013	058	Capítulo 58	N/A
December 10, 2013	059	Capítulo 59	N/A
December 11, 2013	060	Capítulo 60	83 minutes
December 12, 2013	061	Capítulo 61	81 minutes
December 16, 2013	062	Capítulo 62	81 minutes
December 17, 2013	063	Capítulo 63	N/A
December 18, 2013	064	Capítulo 64	81 minutes
December 19, 2013	065	Capítulo 65	82 minutes
December 23, 2013	066	Capítulo 66	82 minutes
December 26, 2013	067	Capítulo 67	N/A
December 30, 2013	068	Capítulo 68	N/A
January 2, 2014	069	Capítulo 69	79 minutes
January 3, 2014	070	Capítulo 70	N/A
