= Gary Forero =

Colombian actor

- Born: 7 August 1979 (age 47); Bogotá, Colombia
- Other name: Gary Forero Caballo
- Occupation: Actor

Gary Forero (born 7 August 1979) is a Colombian actor.

== Filmography ==
=== Telenovelas ===
- 2018 - Las Muñecas de la mafia 2
- 2017 - El Héroe Discreto
- 2011 - Los Canarios
- 2010 - El Clon ....Pablo
- 2009 - Bella Calamidades ....Fabián Poncela
- 2009 - Victorinos ....Rafael Hernández
- 2008 - Doña Bárbara ....León Mondragón
- 2005 - Juego limpio .........Milton Paniagua
