= Doña Bárbara (2008 TV series) =

- Genre: Telenovela
- Created by: Valentina Párraga
- Based on: Doña Bárbara by Rómulo Gallegos
- Directed by: Mauricio Cruz; Agustin Restrepo
- Starring: Edith González; Christian Meier; Genesis Rodriguez; Katie Barberi; Arap Bethke
- Opening theme: "Dame tu amor" by Estela Díaz
- Countries of origin: Colombia; United States
- Original language: Spanish
- No. of episodes: 191

Production
- Executive producer: Hugo León Ferrer
- Producers: Brendan Fitzgerald; Marlon Quintero
- Production locations: Honda, Tolima, Colombia
- Running time: 42–45 minutes
- Production companies: RTI Producciones; Sony Pictures Television; Telemundo Studios

Original release
- Network: Telemundo
- Release: August 4, 2008 – May 22, 2009

Related
- Victoria; Más sabe el diablo; Doña Bárbara (1967); Doña Bárbara (1975); La Doña (2016)

Doña Bárbara is a Spanish-language telenovela produced by Hugo León Ferrer for Telemundo in 2008–2009. It is based on the 1929 Venezuelan novel Doña Bárbara by Rómulo Gallegos.

Like most of its soap operas, the network initially broadcast English subtitles as closed captions on CC3 until late October, when the translations were canceled. This show was the first to have subtitles restored when closed captions were reintroduced in late March 2009.

Edith González, Christian Meier, and Genesis Rodriguez star as the protagonists, Katie Barberi and Arap Bethke as co-protagonists.

== Story ==
Set in the plains of Venezuela and Colombia, this melodrama features a courageous, beautiful, and strong-willed woman who must rise above heartbreak, betrayal, and tragedy. Her troubled past haunts her, as she confronts her own deep-seated vulnerabilities in the face of an impossible love. She falls passionately for a dashing man and must face her memories head-on. She must fight to keep her secrets from destroying her chance of happiness, fulfillment, and true love. The show's English trailer says, "The best stories feature strong women. This is the story that started it all."

== Summary ==
Bárbara is an attractive woman raised mostly on the rivers of Venezuela by her riverboat captain father. Her mother was an Indian woman who died while giving birth to her. She was madly in love with young Asdrúbal until tragedy smashed everything. Some of the men who worked for her father steal their boat and kill her father. The bandits then rape her and shoot her boyfriend. This causes her to hate men, but at the same time sleep with them to get what she wants. She becomes involved with Lorenzo Barquero, the owner of a cattle ranch, with whom she becomes pregnant and has a daughter named Marisela. Barbara later steals Lorenzo's home and fortune and kicks both him and their daughter out, leaving them to fend for themselves with absolutely nothing. Santos is the only remaining son of the Luzardo family, who had a feud with the Barqueros. He returns to his hacienda, Altamira, planning to sell it. Undeterred, Santos sets out to save his cousin Lorenzo and to educate young Marisela. After Barbara sees one of her old rapists and kills him she decides that in order to gain back the peace and happiness that was stolen from her that horrible night she must find and kill all 5 of her rapists. When she meets Santos she instantly falls in love with him seeing as he reminds her of her first love Asdrubal. In him, she thinks she can find happiness and that he can help her change and become a different person. Santos is very attracted to Barbara and genuinely cares for her and wants to help save her from herself, they go through a long, drama-filled romance in which he is never sure he should be with her because of all the horrible things he hears of her and it is only until she is raped a second time and almost killed by "Chepo", one of the same men that raped her as a girl, that he admits he is in love with her. When Chepo dies in front of Barbara from a heart attack she is furious and sad at the same time because after he rapes her a second time she wasn't able to kill him, she then destroys her prayer room and says she can manage on her own, this action makes her rebullones (imaginary birds that sometimes symbolise her mood) die. Santos and Barbara were living happily at her ranch for some period. Her happiness with Santos doesn't last as one day he realizes he loves Marisela and when he reads Mr. Danger's diary (one of Barbara's accomplices) in which he finds out all of the things Barbara has done he decides he can't be with her anymore and that no matter what he has done she can't be saved.

When Marisela comes back from the city educated and civilized she decides to take her mother to court and take back her father's ranch with the help and support of Santos, during the trials it is known that Sapo, Barbara's worst enemy (one of the rapists), bought the judge and made him favor Marisela. When Barbara loses el Miedo she is not willing to give it up and comes to an arrangement with Marisela to buy it. While Marisela and Santos are happy living their romance Barbara finds out that she is two months pregnant. When Santos hears the news he is furious and decides not to believe Barbara and accuses her of having cheated on him but Marisela knows that Barbara would have never done such a thing and believes her and decides to break off their relationship. Santos slowly comes to realize his mistake and accept the baby is his. When word of Barbara's pregnancy gets to "El Sapo" (her worst enemy, one of the rapers) who is now a high ranking and powerful drug trafficker sends his men to burn Barbara's ranch and to kill anyone who is in it, including her. As the hacienda burns Barbara is able to get Eustaquia, her nanny (mother figure) to the basement for safety seeing as there is no other way out. She then confronts Sapo and his men and starts firing at them from inside the house. Melquiades, Barbara's right hand, is able to get to Marisela and warn her that her mother is in danger and she and Santos get there in time to help her. The day after Barbara starts suffering from abdomen pains and with the help of Juan Primito goes to la Chusmita, place where she abandoned Marisela when she was two, to meet up with Melquiades. There she loses her baby and goes crazy. She forgets everything that happened to her and that she lost her baby. When Marisela finds out she tries taking Barbara to see a doctor but while they are in the city she sees Sapo and reacts badly even though she doesn't remember who he is. Melquiades decides to take her back to el Miedo which is fully restored. She starts remembering everything and is heartbroken, she can't believe that she lost her last chance at happiness and what she considered her salvation. During that whole time, Barbara and Marisela managed to become a little close. Santos finds out that she isn't pregnant anymore and gets happy because now there is no obstacle between him and Marisela. Marisela has decided to stay with Gonzalo in order to spy on him after finding out that he and "El Sapo" are allies in drug trafficking. Now, the fear caused by "El Sapo" is bringing Barbara and Marisela back together once more to destroy "El Sapo". Barbara decides to end her war with Sapo once and for all and in order to do so, she needs everyone she cares about to be away from her. She makes Marisela believe that she hates her in order to scare her away (which doesn't work) and sends Eustaquia and Juan Primito to live at Danger's house, who is now deceased (killed by Balbino). When Sapo finds out where Eustaquia is staying he decides to pay her a visit and, to get back at Barbara, cuts her veins, when Barbara finds her she is lying on the floor unconscious. Eustaquia dies in her arms but before she tells Barbara that once everything is done she will see everything differently and that at that moment she should go back to the river. After Eustaquias funeral Barbara realises that "Sapo" is watching her and the battle between them starts inside an abandoned church next to the cemetery. During the fight "Sapo" is about to shoot Barbara but Melquiades gets in the way and takes the shot, Barbara runs to him and he professes his love to her and tells her to not let anyone mistreat her physically or emotionally and that if a man doesn't love her like he did that he isn't worth the time, at that moment he dies in Barbara's arms leaving her alone. While her fight with "Sapo" continues Santos arrives making Barbara lose concentration and allowing "Sapo" to capture her. "Sapo" ties both Barbara and Santos but Barbara is able to knock him out with a sleeping dart and unties herself but refuses to untie Santos as she knows he will stop her from doing what she must; kill "Sapo". Once Barbara finishes tying "Sapo" up Santos tries to talk her out of it but she refutes that she owes it to Eustaquia, to Melquiades, to Asdrubal, and to herself, but above it all, she owes it to the son she lost because of him. She tells him that he always called her a monster and that now he would really get to see her in action. She then muffles him and continues to wake up "Sapo", she ignores his pleas. When he tells her that she is better than he is and that she can't kill him she responds that she is worse than the devil. She ends everything by setting him on fire. When everything is done she leaves and realizes that even though her vengeance is complete she is not in any more peace as she was before and questions if everything she did was done in vain. The detective who was sent to capture Sapo is now after Barbara but she is able to escape with the help of everyone, Marisela, Santos, etc. as they now understand everything Barbara did and why she did it. Before leaving Barbara demands Santos tell her why he is helping her, she tells him that this is his way of setting everything right since he changed her for her daughter, his way of saving her since he wasn't able to save her soul, he responds that that is not it. She continues to push him until he admits that it's because he loves her, that she is the love he can't have and that he had to get away to save himself from her abyss and that he also loves Marisela because she is his salvation. After finally hearing Santos be completely honest with his feeling to her she leaves.

Once Barbara is away from everything she contemplates everything and in a monologue says that she does love Marisela and that she has nothing out there left and that she is going to reunite with Eustaquia and Melquiades and that her death is her payment to those she made suffer, she lets Cabos Blancos free saying that she is giving him his freedom back as she gave Santos' freedom back and proceeds to drown herself in the marsh. Cabos Blancos returns to Altamira and Marisela sees him and worries that something happened to Barbara and goes to look for her. She finds her sinking in the marsh, she ties a rope around herself and goes in to get Barbara out, as Marisela starts sinking Barbara grabs her and pulls herself and Marisela out. Barbara and Marisela have a long talk and forgive each other for everything. Barbara tells her that she has to go, that she can't stay because she wouldn't be able to watch her and Santos together. She says she wants to preserve this feeling she has and that she has never felt, she finally feels like a mother before a woman. Before leaving on her bongo Santos arrives and watches as her and Marisela say their last goodbyes, Antonio asks him if he isn't going to go say goodbye and he responds that he doesn't want to be an obstacle in their last moment like he has always been. Barbara tells Marisela that they won't see each other but that she'll know how she is every morning when she thinks about her and tells her that when one of her children looks up at her with her eyes she'll know she's with her. That night Barbara runs into a missionary who gives her a place to stay because it is raining, the lady realizes that Barbara has a fever and when she asks her name Barbara responds that she can call her Dona and never reveals her real name. 10 years pass and Santos and Marisela have two boys and a little girl on the way, when Maurice asks him if he still thinks of Barbara he responds yes and that that is the only secret he keeps from Marisela, at that moment Marisela arrives in labor pains and she is rushed to the doctor's office. Barbara (now with long gray hair) has been constantly visiting the missionary woman throughout the ten years giving her medicine for the children that live with her and buying the kids candy and toys all the while she claims to not like children, the missionary tells her she "hides" it well. Later Barbara is lying in the hammock. She is very sick and is dying. The next day as Marisela and Santos are admiring their new baby girl they admit that the little girl has Barbara's eyes, that she looks like her, and at that moment Juan Primito arrives yelling that the ravens (los rebullones) have come back to life and that they all have to be careful. That night we see Barbara next to the river, young again and in her all-black outfit with Eustaquia and Melquiades behind her who have come to take her far away. She tells them that they are dead and asks if that means that she is dreaming or if it means that she is also dead, Mealquiades responds that only humans die and that legends like herself never die and live in the hearts of everyone. She goes with them in the bongo and as Eustaquia asks with who they go Barbara responds "con dios y con la virgen" (with God and the Virgin Mary).

== Cast and characters ==
=== Main characters ===
- Edith González as Bárbara Guaimarán
  - Genesis Rodriguez as Young Bárbara Guaimarán
- Christian Meier as Santos Luzardo Vergel
  - Nicolás Votteler as Child Santos Luzardo Vergel
- Genesis Rodriguez as Marisela Barquero Guaimarán
- Katie Barberi as Cecilia Vergel
- Arap Bethke as Antonio Sandoval
  - Nicolas Niño as Child Antonio Sandoval
- Raul Gutierrez as Coronel Diógenes Pernalete
- Roberto Mateos as Lorenzo Barquero
  - Gabriel Valenzuela as Young Lorenzo Barquero
- Lucy Martínez as Eustaquia
- Iván Rodríguez as Melesio Sandoval
- Alberto Valdiri as Francisco Mujica "Mujiquita"
- Martha Isabel Bolaños as Josefa Aguilar
- Amparo Moreno as Casilda
- Lucho Velasco as Melquíades Gamarra "El Brujeador"
- Daniela Tapia as Gervasia Sandoval
- Mimi Morales as Altagracia Sandoval
- Esmeralda Pinzón as Federica Pernalete
- Alejandra Sandoval as Genoveva Sandoval
- Gary Forero as León Mondragón
- Pedro Rendón as Carmelo López "Carmelito"
- Roberto Manrique as María Nieves González
- Andres Ogilvie Browne as Juan Primito
- Jimmie Bernal as William Danger
- Adriana Silva as Josefina Sandoval
- Paula Barreto as Luisana Requena
- Bibiana Corrales as Melesia Sandoval
- Tiberio Cruz as Juan Palacios "Pajarote"
- Paulo Quevedo as Balbino Paiba.
- Andrés Martínez as Tigre Mondragón

=== Recurring and guests ===
- Felipe Calero as Félix Luzardo Vergel.
- Luis Mesa as José Luzardo.
- Jencarlos Canela as Asdrúbal
- Marcelo Cezán as Florencio Reyes "El Quita dolores"
- Julio César Herrera as Apolinar Prieto
- Maritza Rodríguez as Asunción Vergel de Luzardo
- Herbert King as Don Encarnación Matute
- Hernán Méndez as Diomedes Cabello "Perro de Agua"
- Jorge Reyes as Teniente Guerrero
- Juan Pablo Shuk as Gonzalo Zuluaga
- Didier van der Hove as Capitán Guaimarán.
- Leonardo Acosta as Facundo de la Guarda

== Awards and nominations. ==
Year	Association	Category	Nominated	Result
2009	Premios People en Español	Best Actress	Edith González	Won
2009	Premios People en Español	Best Actor	Christian Meier	Nominated
2009	Premios People en Español	Best Young Actress	Genesis Rodriguez	Nominated
2009	Premios People en Español	Surprise of the Year	Martha Isabel Bolaños	Nominated
2009	Premios People en Español	Best couple	Edith González and Christian Meier	Nominated
2009	Premios TP de Oro	Best telenovela	Doña Bárbara	Nominated

== External links. ==
- Official website (in Spanish)
