= Adriana Romero =

Colombian actress (born 1976)

- Born: Adriana Romero Henríquez; 1976 (age 49–50); Bogotá, Colombia
- Occupation: Actress
- Spouse: Rodrigo Candamil
- Website: https://web.archive.org/web/20110202100736/http://adrianaromeroh.com/

Adriana Romero Henríquez (born 1976) is a Colombian actress. She is the daughter of the late writer Bernardo Romero Pereiro and Judy Henríquez, sister of Jimena Romero and granddaughter of Bernardo Romero Lozano and Carmen de Lugo.

== Filmography ==
- It Was Always Me (2022) TV series as Wendy
- El Clon (2010) TV series as Luisa
- Victoria (2007) TV series as Valeria
- Bluff (2007/I) as Emilia
- Lorena (2005) TV series as Grethel
- La Saga, Negocio de Familia (2004) TV series as Lucrecia Zapata - Young
- El precio del silencio (2002) as Alma
- Hilos invisibles (1998) TV series
- La mujer en el espejo (1997) as Clemencia Santos
