= Te voy a enseñar a querer =

- Genre: Romance; Action; Drama
- Created by: Dago García; Felipe Salamanca; Socorro González Ocampo
- Written by: Carlos Fernández de Soto; Claudia Rojas A.
- Directed by: Mauricio Cruz; Agustín Restrepo
- Theme music composer: Nicolas Uribe
- Opening theme: 'Te Voy a Enseñar a Querer' by Jimena Ángel
- Composer: Natalia Rodríguez
- Countries of origin: United States; Colombia
- Original language: Spanish
- No. of episodes: 129

Production
- Executive producer: Hugo León Ferrer
- Producer: Andrés Santamaría
- Production locations: Bogotá, Colombia
- Editor: Alba Merchán Hamann
- Camera setup: Multi-camera
- Running time: 42-45 minutes
- Production companies: Telemundo; RTI Colombia

Original release
- Network: Telemundo
- Release: August 31, 2004 – March 14, 2005

Te Voy a Enseñar a Querer (English title: Learning to Love) is a Spanish-language telenovela produced by the United States–based television network Telemundo and RTI Colombia. This limited-run series ran for 129 episodes from August 31, 2004, to March 14, 2005.

== Plot ==
Alejandro Méndez is a successful man, married to Isabel, and has two grown children, Pablo and Helena. He loves his breeding ranch that provides bulls for bull fights. Between the ranch and a real estate business, the family enjoys an affluent standard of living.

Alejandro's life changes when Isabel dies suddenly under dubious circumstances. Alejandro falls into a depression and abandons all interest in life, his ranch, and the people he loves.

Diana is a veterinarian who meets Pablo at a nightclub and turns him down due to his rich-boy attitude. Pablo is obsessed with her and when she is hired to work on the ranch, he tries to seduce her.

Milciades, a landowner, envious of the ranch, joins forces with Déborah in a conspiracy attempt. She is treacherous woman who married Isabel's father out of sheer interest and will try to take her out of the picture to conquer Alejandro and obtain his fortune.

The ranch is in the midst of a crisis and Diana protects it. She seeks to pull Alejandro out of his depression, because his family needs him. Diana convinces him to return, to fight for the only true thing that will bring his life back.

One day, Diana discovers that Alejandro is also in love with her and at the same time, Pablo finds out his father has stolen her. Pablo threatens to take his own life and manipulates the situation to get Diana's attention. She feels imprisoned by the turn of events and Alejandro feels terribly guilty, so he falls back to avoid hurting his son. Milciades and Déborah set a trap that will lead to conflict between Diana and Alejandro. Pablo realizes that his father is Diana's one true love and convinces him to fight to reconquer her heart.

== Cast ==
- Miguel Varoni as Alejandro Méndez
- Danna García as Diana Rivera
- Catherine Siachoque as Déborah Buenrostro
  - Dilsa García as Young Déborah
- Michel Brown as Pablo Méndez
- Jorge Cao as Milciades Contreras
- Martín Karpan as Luís Carlos Carmona
- Melvin Cabrera as Salvador Cascante
- Carolina Lizarazo as Flor del Valle
- Ana Lucía Domínguez as Camila Buenrostro
- Sharmel Altamirano as Elena Méndez
- Consuelo Luzardo as Rufina Rivera
- Carlos Duplat as Félix Gallardo
- Silvio Ángel as Pedro Rivera
- María Helena Döehring as Isabel de Méndez / Orquídeas Fernández
- Julio del Mar as Tobías Cascante
- Natalia Giraldo as Tulia Ángeles Vivas
- Silvia de Dios as Empera Ángeles Vivas
- Juan Pablo Shuk as Juan Manuel Andrade
- Toto Vega as Cachimbo
- Julián Álvarez as Aycardo
- Ricardo González as Pueblita Rozar
- Didier van der Hove as Dr. Rodrigo Rodríguez
- Alexander Rodríguez as Dionisio
- Irene Arias as Justina
- Iván Rodríguez as Sacrificios Díaz de León
- Luz Estella Luengas as Clementina Ángeles Vivas
- Adriana Campos as Margarita Ángeles
- Cristina Pimiento as Estefanía Ángeles
- Germán Rojas as Vicente
- Oscar Vargas as Beto
- Alejandro Mendoza as Daniel Pérez
- Luz Mary Arias as Mónica
- José Bautista as Inspector Cataño No. 1
- Jaime Rayo as Inspector Cataño No. 2
- Sigifredo Vega as Don Olegario
- Margarita Duran as Raquel Buenrostro
- Juan Rafael Restrepo as Juan Rafael
- Santiago Alarcón as Bernardo Ángeles
- German Arias as Dr. Banderas
- Alfonso Rojas as Chucho Mejia
- Carlos Vergara as Jacinto Mejia
- Vilma Vera as Doña Pepa
- Martha Isabel Bolaños as Charó Bedoya
- Helga Díaz as Nachely Carmona
- Ricardo Andrés Herrera as Emilio Contreras
- Naren Daryanani as Hugo
- Manuel Busquets as Lorenzo
- Carlos Hurtado as Moncho
