= Andrea López =

Colombian actress

Andrea Lopez
- Born: December 7, 1977 (age 48); Cali, Valle del Cauca, Colombia
- Occupation: Actress

Andrea Lopez (born December 7, 1977) is a Colombian actress. She is best known for her antagonistic roles in telenovelas. She is best known for her role as antagonist Mariángel Sánchez de Moncada in Zorro: La Espada y La Rosa (2007).

== Filmography ==
=== Films ===
Year	Title	Role	Notes
2001	La ciénaga	Isabel	
2011	Sexo, mentiras y muertos	Viviana	

=== Television ===
Year	Title	Role	Notes
1994-1995	O todos en la cama	Inés Mercedes Videla "La Rana"	Television debut
1996	La sombra del deseo		
1997	Prisioneros del amor	Camila Falcón	
1998	La madre	Cecilia Suárez Caicedo	
1998	Castillo de naipes		
2001	Amantes del desierto	Camila Santana	
2004	Luna, la heredera	Paloma	
2004	La saga, negocio de familia	Aleksa	
2006	La ex		
2006	Amores cruzados	Deborah Smith	
2007	El Zorro, la espada y la rosa	Mariángel Sánchez de Moncada	
2007	Victoria	Tatiana López	
2008	La rosa de Guadalupe	Tana	Episode: "Ciber-amor"
2009	El fantasma del Gran Hotel	Julieta Esquivel	
2010	El Clon	Marisa Antonelli	
2011	El secretario	Paola Zorrilla	
2013	Mentiras perfectas	Kimberly Jones	
2015	Dueños del paraíso	Analía Menchaca de Esparza	
2015	¿Quién mató a Patricia Soler?	Florencia Ríos	

== Series ==
- Decisiones(2006–2008)
- O todos en la cama (1994–1995).... Inés Mercedes Videla "La Rana"
