= Los herederos del Monte =

- Created by: Víctor Carrasco (original story); Cristina Policastro; Gloria Soares
- Developed by: RTI Producciones by Telemundo
- Directed by: Rodolfo Hoyos; Agustin Restrepo
- Starring: Marlene Favela; Mario Cimarro; José Luis Reséndez; Margarita Muñoz; Fabián Ríos; Jonathan Islas; Ezequiel Montalt
- Theme music composer: Nicolas Uribe; Oliver Camargo; Jose Carlos Maria; Marco Flores
- Opening theme: "Dame tu Amor" performed by Paola Vargas "Desde Que Estas Aqui" performed by Salvatore Casandro and Paola Vargas "Me Cuesta Tan Caro Quererte" performed by Marco Flores
- Countries of origin: Colombia; United States
- Original language: Spanish
- No. of episodes: 128

Production
- Executive producer: Hugo León Ferrer
- Producer: Andres Santamaria
- Production locations: Bogotá, Colombia
- Editors: Mauricio Gonzalez; Diego Rene Garcia
- Camera setup: Multi-camera
- Running time: 41-44 minutes

Original release
- Network: Telemundo
- Release: January 10 – July 15, 2011

Related
- El fantasma de Elena; Flor salvaje; Hijos del Monte; La herencia, un legado de amor

Los herederos del Monte (The Del Monte Dynasty) is a 2011 Spanish-language telenovela produced by Telemundo and RTI Colombia. Filming took place in Colombia, the series is a remake of the Chilean telenovela Hijos del Monte produced by TVN in 2008. The telenovela stars Marlene Favela, Mario Cimarro, José Luis Reséndez, Margarita Muñoz, Fabián Ríos, Jonathan Islas and Ezequiel Montalt.

== Production ==
The first teaser of the telenovela was released on Telemundo during the premiere of Aurora at 8pm/7c slot on 1 November 2010, replacing El Clon. Los Herederos del Monte replaced El Fantasma de Elena on the 9pm/8c slot, Telemundo aired the series during the 2011 season from Monday to Friday for 27 weeks. As with most of its other telenovelas, the network broadcasts English subtitles as closed captions on CC3.

== Plot summary ==
Five adopted brothers Juan, Jose, Pedro, Gaspar and Lucas see how their easygoing life in the countryside is changed by the death of their father Emilio del Monte, who gives part of his land to his only biological child Paula, who comes to claim what belongs to her. Paula begins to interfere with the close bond the brothers have, especially when some of them become attracted to her, especially Juan del Monte. They both fall in love which results in Juan leaving Julieta. But when Julieta gets pregnant, Juan marries her but not for love. Sadly, Julieta loses her baby and leaves Juan. As a result, Juan starts a relationship with Paula. However, Jose discovers Paula and her mother's lie, about not being Emilio's daughter, thus Jose blackmails Paula and force her to leave Juan. Paula leaves Juan but she finds out she is pregnant from Juan and she does not know what to do so she decides to leave the house. Julieta finds out she has a brain tumor and wants to get revenge on Paula for all the pain and misfortune she has caused in her life. Julieta attempts to kill Paula but she never does it. Modesto found out that Emilio did not die, instead, he planned everything to see how his sons were really like, if they were greedy. Emilio returns to the house with a new identity as Pablo Gonzalez and his presence causes chaos around the Del Monte house. It is revealed that Juan is technically Emilio's biological son and that he knew Paula was not his daughter. Jose kidnaps "Pablo", Paula and Adela but they are rescued by Juan. Emilio later dies but not before changing his will. Juan and Paula ended up being together, with Paula and her mother ended up accomplishing their goal of keeping the fortune of Del Monte family.

== Cast ==
Main cast in order of appearance

Actor	Character	Description
Marlene Favela	Paula del Monte	Protagonist. Daughter of Sofia and Gustavo, feisty and manipulative but vulnerable, lied that she was Emilio's daughter in an attempt to keep his fortune, in love with Juan. Married to Juan and has a baby with him
Mario Cimarro	Juan del Monte	Protagonist. One of the five adopted sons of Emilio and Clarisa, ends up being Emilio's biological son, in love with Paula, was in love and married to Julieta. Married to Paula
José Luis Resendez	José del Monte	Villain. One of the five adopted sons of Emilio and Clarisa, second eldest, father of Simon. Imprisoned.
Margarita Muñoz	Julieta Millán	Villain. Daughter of Miguel and Rosa, sister of Consuelo and Rosario, was a nice person until she starts hating Paula, was in love with Pedro and Juan, was married to Juan, becomes evil when Paula wants to return with Juan. Imprisoned.
Fabián Ríos	Gaspar del Monte	One of the five adopted sons of Emilio and Clarisa, fourth eldest, noble and good-hearted but short-tempered, husband of Guadalupe
Jonathan Islas	Lucas del Monte	The youngest of the five adopted sons of Emilio and Clarisa, was in love with Paula, in love with Rosario
Alejandra Sandoval	Guadalupe Mardones	Daughter of Eleuterio and Inés, wife of Gaspar, Beatriz's friend and singer, mother of Gaspar's daughter
Ezequiel Montalt	Pedro del Monte	One of the five adopted sons of Emilio and Clarisa, third eldest, was in love with Julieta and Berta, ends up with Beatriz
Carla Giraldo	Rosario Millán	Daughter of Miguel and Rosa, in love with Lucas, sister of Julieta and Consuelo, raped by Nacho when she was 16 years old
Margarita Reyes	Beatriz Pereira	Estranged wife of Efraín, mother of Simon
Pedro Rendón	Efraín Mardones	Son of Modesto, estranged husband of Beatriz, ends up with Adela and finally forgets about Beatriz
Juan Pablo Obregón	Johnny Delgado	A worker for the del Monte family, husband of Consuelo, stepfather to Consuelo's daughter
Karina Cruz	Consuelo Millán	Daughter of Miguel and Rosa, wife of Johnny, raped by Nacho, pregnant by Nacho when he raped her
Emerson Rodriguez	Amador Cereceda	Biological brother of Lucas, was in love with Rosario
Natasha Klauss	Berta Soto	A maid for the Millán family, later moved to the del Monte family, in love with Modesto, married to him
Didier Van Den Hove	Eleuterio Mardones	Brother of Modesto, father of Guadalupe, former husband of Inés
Margarita Durán	Rosa Cifuentes	Wife of Miguel, mother of Julieta, Consuelo and Rosario, former mistress of Emilio del Monte, former friend of Sofia.
Diana Quijano	Sofía Cañadas	Villain. Mother of Paula, former mistress of Emilio, Miguel and Gustavo, former friend of Rosa
Javier Delgiudice	Miguel Millán	Husband of Rosa, father of Rosario, Consuelo, and Julieta, had an affair with Sofía
Roberto Mateos	Modesto Mardones	Brother of Eleuterio, father of Efraín, father-figure and former butler of the del Monte brothers, in love with Berta, married to her

Secondary cast

Actor	Character	Description
Julio del Mar	Emilio del Monte	Father of five adopted sons, biological father of Juan
Andres Felipe Martinez	Gustavo del Fierro	Villain. Lawyer of Paula, Sofia, and the del Monte family, lover of Sofia, Paula's biological father, kidnaps Emilio. Dies from crash
Alejandro Lopez	Esteban Montero	Villain, in love with Paula
Roberto Vander	Emilio del Monte	Believed to have died, actually held hostage. Had plastic surgery, going by alias Pablo Gonzalez. Dies of natural cause
Katherine Porto	Adela	Paula's best friend, ends up with Efraín
Adriana López	Inés	Mother of Guadalupe
Natalie Morales	Caroline Wolf	Wife of Emiliano
Javier Gómez	Emiliano Lopez Oberto	Businessman, husband of Caroline
Andres Ogilvie	Nacho	Villain, imprisoned for rape
Joaquin Ujueta	Simon	Son of Beatriz and Jose
Alfredo Esper		Doctor
Maria Leon	Carmen Cereceda	Biological mother of Lucas and Amador
Sandra Guzman	Magdalena	Chief servant at the del Monte family
Maria Cristina Galindo	Magda	A woman that helped Emilio del Monte, wife of Ángel
Carlos Ulises Villa	Ángel	A man that helped Emilio del Monte, husband of Magda
Ingrid Solano		Pedro's psychologist
Lucía Garay		Principal at Consuelo and Rosario's school
Jacob Isaza		One of the bad guys who wanted to hurt Amador because he owes them money
Armando Rivera		One of the bad guys who wanted to hurt Amador because he owes them money
Hugo Castro		Fireman
Pedro Antonio Vargas		Priest
Miguel Puerta		Julieta's doctor

== Episodes ==
Season One
Episode	Episode Name	Date Released	Episode Length	Description
1	The Arrival of Paula	01/12/2020	44 minutes	Paula comes to La Arboleda to change the lives of the Monte brothers. Everyone is surprised to meet Monte's only blood daughter. Paula kisses Juan, he is Julieta's fiancé.
2	Dangerous Seduction	01/13/2020	43 minutes	Juan lets himself be seduced by Paula and his attraction begins to condemn his love for Julieta. José demands that he be honest with his fiancée. Beatriz tells José that he is the father of her son.
3	Hidden Truths	01/14/2020	44 minutes	Paula has everything coldly calculated to gain the inheritance and control over Juan's feelings. Paula plans an alliance with Pedro, who is in love with Julieta.
4	Passionate Games	01/15/2020	43 minutes	Paula achieves her goal of entangling Juan in her passionate game and the battle for her love intensifies. Juan kisses Paula and tells Julieta that he wants to postpone the wedding.
5	Mixed Feelings	01/16/2020	41 minutes	Juan is confused with his feelings. The DNA result confirms that José is the biological father of Beatriz's son. Pedro reveals to Juan that he is in love with Julieta.
6	Irresistible Attraction	01/19/2020	43 minutes	The attraction between Paula and Juan has become irresistible, but Julieta struggles to get back with him. The brothers oppose Juan's relationship with the woman who wants to take away his inheritance.
7	Dangerous Alliance	01/20/2020	44 minutes	In love and in war, anything goes and Paula knows perfectly that her best ally is Pedro, they both do everything possible to achieve their goals. Meanwhile, Lucas confesses his interest in Paula.
8	Revenge Blow	01/21/2020	44 minutes	Pedro sets a trap, but does not achieve his goal because Julieta gives a piece of news that affects Paula's plans. This new romance is interrupted when Juan learns that he may be a father.
9	Forbidden Attraction	01/22/2020	44 minutes	Paula does her best not to lose the game. Julieta, with her pregnancy, makes Juan stay with her and decide to move away from his sister, despite his strong attraction.
10	Extreme Jealousy	01/23/2020	44 minutes	Paula's jealousy leads her to take extreme measures and demand her inheritance in order to get Juan and his future wife off the estate.
11	Thirst for Ambition	01/26/2020	44 minutes	Revenge and hatred lead the del Montes to face each other when José tries to push Paula and her mother out of the way, thinking that Juan will not come to their defense.
12	Jealousy and Rage	01/27/2020	44 minutes	José assumes his responsibility as a father to rescue his son, when Efraín tries to take him away out of jealousy and rage, while Paula and Julieta are confronted again by Juan.
13	Man Without Compromise	01/28/2020	44 minutes	José does not want to commit to Beatriz and when she hopes for a new life with the man she loves, he puts her in her place. Julieta suggests to Juan that he live with her parents.
14	Romantic Game	01/29/2020	44 minutes	Pedro is unable to persuade Julieta not to marry Juan. So while the groom is organizing a bachelor party, Pedro prepares a camera to reveal a devastating act.
15	Losing the Game	01/30/2020	44 minutes	Paula loses the most important game after the wedding of Juan and Julieta. Her pact with Pedro is useless because her sexual appeal does not manage to separate the man she wants so much from her rival.
16	Honeymoon	02/02/2020	44 minutes	Paula is furious with Pedro because he cannot stop Juan's wedding with Julieta, he claims to have shown the video to the bride, but she leaves that matter for the honeymoon.
17	Truth Hurts	02/03/2020	44 minutes	The truth torments Juan, he knows that Pedro is right to assure that he does not love Julieta, he feels that he is sinning when he thinks of Paula. The bride and groom halt the honeymoon.
18	Painful Betrayal	02/04/2020	44 minutes	Julieta yells at Juan about his betrayal, by making it clear that she knows about his infidelity with Paula before arriving at the altar and swearing his love to her and their son. Pedro is discharged from the hospital.
19	Foul Play	02/05/2020	44 minutes	Juan discovers Paula and Pedro's foul play, but Julieta wants to fight for his heart. She challenges him to defy his lover if he wants to continue their marriage.
20	A Women's Challenge	02/06/2020	44 minutes	Julieta confronts Paula with Juan to avenge the foul play and show her that she can win the war for her husband's love. Paula tries to assert her rights at the estate.
21	Challenges and Addictions	02/09/2020	44 minutes	Paula continues to challenge Juan's urges to see how he feels about her. Pedro catches everyone's attention due to his addiction and the need to love, he asks for forgiveness and helps his brother.
22	Game of Tears	02/10/2020	44 minutes	Paula's game is not over yet, while Juan tries to forget her amid complaints, her suffering arouses José's interest and he asks her out.
23	Die of Jealousy	02/11/2020	44 minutes	Juan dies of jealousy when he sees José and Paula together, she uses her sex appeal to arouse his anger. The psychologist tells Pedro that she wants to do a session with his siblings.
24	Game of Fire	02/12/2020	44 minutes	Two brothers clash over Paula's love, while she enjoys her revenge by awakening jealousy in Juan with a game of fire. Beatriz demands that José abandon her.
25	Exposure Party	02/13/2020	44 minutes	A party ends in scandal at a revelation fair for the Montes, when Pedro decides to uncover the secrets of the family and the entanglements of his brothers with Paula.
26	Deadly Jealousy	02/16/2020	44 minutes	Julieta surprises Juan who is talking to Paula about the passion that unites them and the jealousy she feels is so strong that she leaves in a hurry, falls down the stairs, and suffers a terrible loss.
27	Sentence of Oblivion	02/17/2020	44 minutes	Julieta sentences Juan to oblivion and decides to move on away from him. Rosa's ambition does not allow him to support her daughter, while Miguel offers her full support.
28	Threat of War	02/18/2020	44 minutes	Julieta threatens Paula and declares a full-on war on her and will do everything possible to avenge the pain of a lost son. Gustavo arrives at the estate to start the divorce proceedings.
