= RTI Producciones =

Media production company of Colombia

Radio Televisión Interamericana S.A.
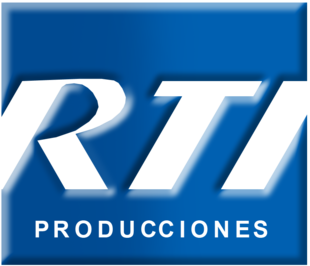
- Founded: 17 March 1963; 63 years ago
- Headquarters: Bogotá, Colombia
- Products: Television programming and airtime

RTI Colombia, also known as Radio Televisión Interamericana (Inter-American Radio and Television), is a Colombian television production company and former programadora. It aired 14.5 hours per week of programming in 1993. In the 1990s, as a programadora, it was a member of OTI Colombia, a coalition that included Producciones PUNCH, Producciones JES, RCN Television, Caracol Televisión and Datos y Mensajes.

Many of its series were co-produced with Telemundo in the United States, including Zorro and Sin Vergüenza. In Colombia, they air on Caracol TV and Citytv Bogotá. R.T.I. had some programming spaces on the state-owned Canal Uno until 2008, when it returned them in order to bid with El Tiempo and Grupo Planeta for the third private national channel licence.

Starting from 2007, the Telemundo-R.T.I. studio (a joint venture of Telemundo & R.T.I.) in Miami is known as Telemundo Television Studios.

== R.T.I. Telenovelas ==
Title	Production Year	Production Countries	Production Companies	Number of Episodes	Airdates
La viuda negra 2	2016	Colombia; Mexico; United States	R.T.I. Producciones; Caracol TV; Televisa; Univision Communications		
La esquina del diablo	2015	Colombia; Mexico; United States	R.T.I. Producciones; Televisa; Univision Communications	70	January 13 – April 26, 2015
El Chivo	2014	Colombia; Mexico; United States	R.T.I. Producciones; Televisa; Univision Communications	70	September 23 - December 31, 2014
¿Quién mató a Patricia Soler?	2014	Colombia; United States	R.T.I. Producciones; MundoFox; RCN TV	101	February 9 - July 30, 2015
La viuda negra	2014	Colombia; Mexico; United States	R.T.I. Producciones; Caracol TV; Televisa; Univision Communications	78 / 80	February 23 - June 8, 2014
La virgen de la calle	2013-2014	Venezuela; Mexico; Colombia	R.T.I. Producciones in RCTV studios Televisa	120	March 3 - August 29, 2014
La Madame	2013	Colombia; Mexico; United States	R.T.I. Producciones; Sierralta Entertainment Group; Televisa; Univision Communications	37 / 50	August 26, 2013 - October 31, 2013
Tres Caínes	2013	Colombia	R.T.I. Producciones; RCN TV	80	March 4 - June 21, 2013
Las bandidas	2013	Venezuela; Mexico; Colombia	R.T.I. Producciones in RCTV studios Televisa; RCN TV	104 / 120	April 3 - September 3, 2013
¿Quién eres tú?	2012-2013	Colombia; Mexico; United States	R.T.I. Producciones; Televisa; Univision Communications	9 / 120	January 7–18, 2013
Flor salvaje	2011-2012	Colombia; United States	R.T.I. Producciones; Telemundo Studios	150	August 2, 2011 - March 2, 2012
Los Herederos del Monte	2011	Colombia; United States	R.T.I. Producciones; Telemundo Studios	128	January 10 - July 15, 2011
La Reina del Sur	2011	Colombia; United States; Spain	R.T.I. Producciones; Telemundo Studios; Antena 3	63	February 28 - May 30, 2011
Ojo por Ojo	2010-2011	Colombia; United States	R.T.I. Producciones; Telemundo Studios	98	Unaired
El Clon	2010	Colombia; United States; Brazil	R.T.I. Producciones; Telemundo Studios; Rede Globo	181 / 184	February 15 - October 29, 2010
La Diosa Coronada	2010	Colombia; United States	R.T.I. Producciones; Telemundo Studios; Caracol TV	31 / 25	August 11 - September 7, 2010
Bella Calamidades	2009-2010	Colombia; United States	R.T.I. Producciones Telemundo Studios	140	September 16, 2013 - January 3, 2014
Victorinos	2009-2010	Colombia; United States	R.T.I. Producciones; Telemundo Studios	153	June 23, 2009 - February 5, 2010
Niños Ricos, Pobres Padres	2009	Colombia; United States	R.T.I. Producciones; Telemundo Studios	131 / 125	July 7, 2009 - January 8, 2010
Sin Senos no Hay Paraíso	2008-2009	Colombia; Mexico; United States	R.T.I. Producciones; Telemundo Studios	238 / 167	June 16, 2008 - June 22, 2009
Doña Bárbara	2008-2009	Colombia; United States	R.T.I. Producciones; Telemundo Studios; Sony Pictures Television	190	August 4, 2008 - May 21, 2009
Victoria	2007-2008	Colombia; United States	R.T.I. Producciones; Telemundo Studios	169	December 4, 2007 - August 1, 2008
La Traición	2008	Colombia; United States	R.T.I. Producciones; Telemundo Studios	106	January 29 - June 27, 2008
Madre Luna	2007	Colombia; United States	R.T.I. Producciones; Telemundo Studios	141	July 2, 2007 - January 28, 2008
Sin Vergüenza	2007	Colombia; United States	R.T.I. Producciones; Telemundo Studios	86	April 16 - August 21, 2007
Zorro, la Espada y la Rosa	2007	Colombia; United States	R.T.I. Producciones; Telemundo Studios; Sony Pictures Television; Zorro Producciones	112 / 122	February 12 - July 23, 2007
Amores de Mercado	2006	Colombia; United States	R.T.I. Producciones; Telemundo Studios	123	June 14, 2006 - January 12, 2007
La Tormenta	2005-2006	Colombia; United States	R.T.I. Producciones; Telemundo Studios	216	September 19, 2005 - July 24, 2006
La Mujer en el Espejo	2004-2005	Colombia; United States	R.T.I. Producciones; Telemundo Studios	151	December 23, 2004 - July 15, 2005
Te voy a enseñar a querer	2004-2005	Colombia; United States	R.T.I. Producciones; Telemundo Studios	129	August 31, 2004 - March 14, 2005
Pasión de gavilanes	2003-2004	Colombia; United States	R.T.I. Producciones; Telemundo Studios; Caracol TV	188	October 21, 2003 - September 14, 2004
Ángel de la guarda, mi dulce compañía	2003-2004	Colombia; United States	Caracol TV; Telemundo Studios; R.T.I. Producciones	122	September 15, 2003 - July 23, 2004
Sofía dame tiempo	2003	Colombia; United States	Caracol TV; Telemundo Studios; R.T.I. Producciones	130	March 3 - October 7, 2003
La venganza	2002-2003	Colombia; United States	R.T.I. Producciones; Telemundo Studios	127	November 4, 2002 - May 16, 2003
Luzbel está de visita	2001	Colombia; United States	R.T.I. Producciones; Caracol TV; Telemundo Studios	104	August 16, 2001 - January, 2002
Amantes del desierto	2001	Colombia; United States	R.T.I. Producciones; Caracol TV; Telemundo Studios	121	March 19 - September 4, 2001
Rauzán	2000	Colombia	R.T.I. Producciones; Caracol TV	100	2000
La caponera	1999-2000	Colombia	R.T.I. Producciones; Caracol TV	100	February 14 - November 10, 2000
Divorciada	1999	Colombia	R.T.I. Producciones		1999
La Sombra del Arco Iris	1998	Colombia	R.T.I. Producciones	63	September 21, 1998 - February 5, 1999
Yo amo a Paquita Gallego	1997-1999	Colombia	R.T.I. Producciones	298 / 149	March 30, 1998 - February 12, 1999
La mujer en el espejo	1997	Colombia	R.T.I. Producciones		June 21, 1997 - September 18, 1998
Dos Mujeres	1997-1998	Colombia	R.T.I. Producciones	200 / 102	May 7 - December 19, 1997
La Viuda de Blanco	1996-1997	Colombia	R.T.I. Producciones	290 / 145	February 5, 1996 - May 6, 1997
Clase aparte	1995	Colombia	R.T.I. Producciones	51	November 12, 1994 - February 25, 1996
María Bonita	1995-1996	Colombia	R.T.I. Producciones	190 / 95	April 3, 1995 - February 2, 1996
Las Aguas Mansas	1994-1995	Colombia	R.T.I. Producciones	250 / 125	January 17, 1994 - March 31, 1995
Detrás de un Ángel	1993-1994	Colombia	R.T.I. Producciones	58	September 6, 1993 - January 14, 1994
Dulce Ave Negra	1993	Colombia	R.T.I. Producciones		February 26 - September 3, 1993
En Cuerpo Ajeno	1992-1993	Colombia	R.T.I. Producciones	244 / 122	January 2, 1992 - February 25, 1993
Ana de Negro	1991-1992	Colombia	R.T.I. Producciones	108	May 14 - December 31, 1991
Castigo Divino	1990-1991	Colombia	R.T.I. Producciones	108	January 20 - April 14, 1991

== R.T.I. Series ==
- Fuego Verde (1996-1998)
- Los Pecados de Ines de Hinojosa (1988)
- Los Cuervos (1986)
- Cuando quiero llorar no lloro (aka Los Victorinos, 1991)
- El segundo enemigo (1988)
- Don Chinche (1982-1989)
- Zarabanda (1989)
- Yo y tú (1965-1977) (1985-1986)

== Variety ==
- Super Sábado (2000)
- La Bella y La Bestia (1997–1998)
- Quiere Cacao (1996–2001)
- Quac! El Noticero (1995–1997)
- Fantástico (1993)
- Miss Mundo Colombia (1992–present)
- TV Turismo (1988-1994)
- El Programa del Millón (1986–1990)
- Enviado Especial (1976–1996)
