= La Tormenta =

2005 Colombian telenovela

- Genre: Telenovela
- Created by: Humberto "Kiko" Olivieri
- Written by: Isamar Hernández; Alejandro Vergara; Carolina Díaz; Tabare Pérez
- Directed by: Agustin Restrepo; Mauricio Cruz
- Creative director: Gabriela Monroy
- Starring: Natalia Streignard; Christian Meier; Natasha Klauss; Marcelo Buquet; Aura Cristina Geithner
- Music by: Oliver Camargo; Nicolás Uribe
- Opening theme: "Ay amor" by Ricardo Torres
- Original language: Spanish
- No. of episodes: 216

Production
- Executive producer: Hugo León Ferrer
- Production locations: Bogotá; Meta
- Cinematography: Eduardo Carreño; Alfredo Zamudio
- Editor: Alba Merchan Hamann
- Camera setup: Multi-camera
- Running time: 45 minutes
- Production companies: RTI Producciones; Telemundo Studios

Original release
- Network: Telemundo
- Release: September 19, 2005 – July 24, 2006

Related
- La Tempestad; Tierra de esperanza

La Tormenta (The Storm) is a 2005 Colombian telenovela and original story by Humberto "Kiko" Olivieri, produced by RTI Colombia and broadcast by Telemundo. The series stars Natalia Streignard and Christian Meier as the main protagonists, with Natasha Klauss, Kristina Lilley, Marcelo Buquet, and Didier van der Hove as the main villains of the story. Also noted are the stellar performances of Aura Cristina Geithner, Eileen Abad, Manuel Balbi, Carmen Villalobos, and Juan Pablo Shuk. The network debuted the novela on Monday, September 19, 2005 at the 7pm/6pm central timeslot, replacing Amarte así, Frijolito and concluded on July 24, 2006, being replaced by La viuda de Blanco.

== Plot ==
Maria Teresa is a woman accustomed to living in the city, but she has to move to live at ‘La Tormenta’, her family’s estate, to try to save her family from financial ruin. The family is facing economic problems and she thinks La Tormenta will save them from bankruptcy.

== Cast ==
=== Central ===
- Natalia Streignard as María Teresa Montilla Marrero de Torrealba
- Christian Meier as Santos Torrealba / Santiago Guanipa
- Eileen Abad as Valentina Guerrero Ayala
- Natasha Klauss as Isabella Montilla Manterola
- Kristina Lilley as Edelmira Carranza vda. de Guerrero
- Marcelo Buquet as Simón Guerrero Carranza
- Aura Cristina Geithner as Bernarda Ayala
- Carmen Villalobos as Trinidad "Trini" Ayala Camacho
- Manuel Balbi as Jesús Niño Camacho Segura
- Iván Rodríguez as Cipriano Camacho
- Didier van der Hove as Enrique Montalvo
- Juan Pablo Shuk as Father Damián / Cosme
- Danilo Santos as Argemiro Guanipa
- Alejandro Buenaventura as Ernesto Montilla
- Alexander Palacio as Gino
- Constanza Gutierrez as Tatacoa

=== Major ===
- María Cristina Gálvez as Remedios Segura de Camacho
- Rey Vásquez as Father Benito
- Rosemary Bohórquez as Dalilah Gema
- Agmeth Escaf as Alirio Paiba
- Bibiana Navas as Sol "Solita" Cruz
- Luis Gerónimo Abreu as Miguel Antonio "Miguelón" Camacho
- Sandra Pérez as Michelle Cardona
- Patricia Castañeda as Magdalena Camacho
- Vilma Vera as Chepa de Cruz
- Laila Vieira as Amapola
- Diana Neira as Virginia Montes
- Martha Isabel Bolaños as Camelia
- Margarita Durán as Genoveva
- Davison Banda as Trigger/Trey Montezario
- Ricardo González as Demetrio Monaguia Lambió
- Carmen Marina Torres as Natividad / Nany

=== Recurring ===
- Gabriela Vergara as Ariana Santino Castell
- Natalia Giraldo as Azalea Espinoza

== Remake ==
- La tempestad is a Mexican telenovela to be produced by Salvador Mejía Alejandre for Televisa.

== Awards ==
=== TVyNovelas Awards ===
Year	Category	Appointment	Result
2006	Best Supporting Actress in a Soap Opera	Natasha Klauss	Won
