= Amores de mercado (2006 TV series) =

Television series

- Created by: Basilio Álvarez
- Written by: Basilio Álvarez; Irene Calacano; Gennys Perez; Eric Vonn
- Directed by: Rodolfo Hoyos; Andrés Biermann
- Starring: Paola Rey; Mauricio Islas; Michel Brown; Vanessa Villela; Jorge Cao
- Theme music composer: Miguel De Narváez
- Opening theme: Amores de mercado eres tú by Alexa Hernández
- Countries of origin: Colombia; United States
- Original language: Spanish
- No. of episodes: 123

Production
- Executive producer: Hugo León Ferrer
- Cinematography: Mauricio Cadavid; Roberto Cortés
- Editor: José Luis Varón
- Camera setup: Multi-camera
- Running time: 42-45 minutes

Original release
- Network: RTI Producciones; Telemundo
- Release: June 14, 2006 – January 12, 2007

Amores De Mercado (Love at The Market) is a Spanish-language telenovela produced by the United States–based television network Telemundo and RTI Colombia. This limited-run series ran for 125 episodes from June 14, 2006, to January 12, 2007. It aired in Europe and the Middle East on Zone Romantica.

This show was retitled simply Amores in mid-run. Head writer Basilio Alvarez was replaced by Eric Vonn and the storylines and characters went in a new direction. When Telemundo reaired the show in daytime in 2009, the shorter title was used for the entire series. BTV started to air this telenovela on November 22, 2006 in Bulgaria.

== Story ==
Amores De Mercado tells the story of Fernando (Mauricio Islas), an ambitious man who driven by greed will do the unimaginable to his own family, Lucia (Paola Rey), a woman in search of her husband, and Diego (Michel Brown), an athlete who feels defeated by life. Lucia and Diego will meet and find a reason to love again and start over in life, however, destiny will put them to the test. This is a story of second chances and how love can save us when everything else is lost.

== Cast ==
- Mauricio Islas as Fernando Leyra / Antonio Álamo – Husband of Lucía, Antagonistic Protagonist/Main villain
- Paola Rey as Lucía Martínez – Main heroine
- Michel Brown as Diego "El Rayo" Valdes – Main hero
- Vanessa Villela as Raquel Savater / Mónica Savater – Sister of Mónica, dies / girlfriend of Diego, villain
- Jorge Cao as Néstor Savater – Father of Raquel, Mónica and Lucía, villain
- Lully Bossa as Mercedes Martínez – Mother of Lucía
- Salvador del Solar as Eulalio Ocando Savater – Nephew of Nestor and his co-worker
- Juan Pablo Shuk as Manuel Medrano – Boyfriend of Mónica
- Júlio del Mar as Benjamín Santos – Adoptive father of Diego
- Sílvio Ángel as Luis Leyra – Father of Antonio / Fernando
- Silvia de Dios as Fanny – Suitor of Monica and Raquel
- Carlos Kajú as Tequeño Jiménez
- Raúl Gutierrez as Padre Pablo
- Leonor Arango as Elvira Leyra – Mother of Fernando, villain
- Christian Tappan as Gerardo
- Jullye Giliberti as Cristina Moreno – Friend of Lucia
- Sharmel Altamirano as Martha Aguilar
- Didier Van Der Hove as Roberto Gutiérrez – Father of Betty and Andrea
- Carmen Villalobos as Beatriz 'Betty' Gutiérrez
- Diana Neira as Andrea Gutiérrez
- Natalia Bedoya as Juliet
- Dafne Padilla as Laura Moreno
- Alfredo Ahnetr as Irinea
- Ramón Cabrer as Julio
- Ricardo Abarca as Adrián Leyra – Son of Lucía and Fernando, villain
- Jonathan Islas as David Miralvez.
- Laura Perico
- Andrea Montenegro

== Script features ==
Beginning around episode 40, Eric Vonn took over the writing of the series and revised much of the remaining storyline, including its dialogue and scenes. His writing incorporated elements of allegory and satire, often portraying violence and cruelty involving the main characters in a comedic context. These elements became recurring features of his work on the series, reflecting his use of dark humour within the telenovela genre.
