= Hugo León Ferrer =

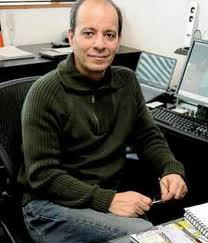
Hugo León Ferrer

Hugo León Ferrer is a Colombian television producer best known for his association with Telemundo and RTI Colombia. He is a former vice-president of production at RTI. His credits include the 1996 version of La Viuda de Blanco, Pasión de Gavilanes, La Tormenta, Sin Vergüenza, Zorro and Madre Luna.

== Trayectory ==
Production Director - Telemundo-RTI Producciones

- La Reina del Sur (Telenovela) (2010/11)

Executive Producer - Telemundo-RTI Producciones

- Flor Salvaje (2011/12)
- Los Herederos Del Monte (2010/11)
- Ojo Por Ojo (2010/11)
- La Diosa Coronada (2010)
- El Clon (2010)
- Bella Calamidades (2009/10)
- Niños Ricos, Pobres Padres (2009)
- Victorinos (2009/10)
- Doña Bárbara (2008/09)
- Sin Senos No Hay Paraíso (2008/09)
- La Traición (2008)
- Victoria (2007/08)
- Madre Luna (2007)
- Sin Vergüenza (2007)
- Zorro: La Espada y la Rosa (2007)
- Amores de mercado (Amores) (2006)
- La Tormenta (2005/06)
- La mujer en el espejo (2004/05)
- Te Voy a Enseñar a Querer (2004/05)
- Pasión de gavilanes (2003/04)
- La Venganza (2002/03)
- Luzbel esta de visita (2001/02)
- Amantes del desierto (2001)

executive producer

- Yo amo a Paquita Gallego (1998)
- La Viuda de Blanco (1996)
- Maria Bonita (1995)
