= La traición (2008 TV series) =

Colombian-American telenovela

- Title card
- Created by: José Fernando Pérez
- Developed by: Telemundo; RTI Colombia
- Directed by: Mauricio Cruz; Agustin Restrepo; Santiago Vargas
- Starring: Mario Cimarro; Danna García
- Theme music composer: Nicolas Uribe; Oliver Camargo; José Carlos Maria
- Opening theme: "Me frena una razon" Salvatore Casandro; Paola Vargas
- Countries of origin: Colombia; United States
- Original language: Spanish
- No. of episodes: 106

Production
- Executive producer: Hugo León Ferrer
- Producer: Andrés Santamaría
- Editor: Alba Merchan Hamann
- Camera setup: Multi camera
- Running time: 45 minutes

Original release
- Network: Telemundo
- Release: January 29 – June 27, 2008

Related
- Madre Luna; El Juramento

La Traición (Betrayed) is a Colombian-American telenovela co-produced by United States-based Telemundo and RTI Colombia. Telemundo debuted this serial on January 7, 2008, replacing Madre Luna. This show is also known as Betrayed.

Traición is based on the Colombian novel El Caballero de Rauzán, written in 1887 by Felipe Pérez. RTI Colombia made another adaptation of the story in 2000, titled Rauzán. As with most of its soap operas, Telemundo broadcast English subtitles as closed captions on CC3. Filming in Bogotá, Colombia, began in late October, 2007.

BTV started to air this telenovela on August 26, 2008, in Bulgaria. RTV Pink started to air this telenovela on January 26, 2009, in Serbia. TV Puls will start to air this novela on August 31, 2009, in Poland. Spain Nova (Spanish TV channel)

== Story ==
This romantic saga features Hugo de Medina, a handsome, mysterious swordsman, with a reputation as a womanizer. His life crashes around him when he finds he has catalepsy, an incurable condition marked by loss of voluntary motion. The same disease felled his father years before.

This dashing young man meets Soledad de Obregon, a gorgeous, refined girl and the two are bound together by sudden passion, though matters are complicated by Hugo's desire to hide his infirmity.

As the adoring couple prepares to marry, tragedy strikes again. Hugo's sinister brother, Alcides, who has always been in love with Soledad, betrays him and steals his betrothed. The rest of the telenovela deals with first Hugo's quest for vengeance and then his attempts to regain the trust and love of Soledad.

== Production notes ==
This telenovela was originally announced with Mario Cimarro, Sandra Echeverría and Gabriel Porras as stars. Danna García replaced Echeverría and Salvador del Solar replaced Porras, who took the male lead in Madre Luna. Telemundo began airing ads promoting this show in September, before filming began. It apparently shortened the series from the original plan of 130 to 106 episodes.

Telemundo also took a shot at rival network Univision by having Michelle Vieth appear in first-run episodes of this show, while Univision aired Al Diablo con los Guapos from 2007. This highlights that the competition rebroadcasts serials that already aired in Mexico several months ago, while Telemundo usually airs original programming. Michelle Vieth is thus one of the few soap performers to appear on competing US networks at the same time.

== Cast ==
- Mario Cimarro .... Hugo de Medina / Alcides de Medina - Main hero/His twin-brother
- Danna García .... Soledad de Obregón
- Michelle Vieth....Michelle Phillips
- Ismael La Rosa... Daniel Von Sirak
- Harry Geithner .... Francisco/Paco/Paquito
- Cesar Mora .... Guillermo Burke
- Virna Flores....Eloísa Renán
- Rossana Fernández-Maldonado .... Beatriz de Linares
- Mónica Franco .... Rebeca Montenegro
- Luz Estella Luengas .... Esther de Obregon
- Germán Rojas .... Lucas de Obregon
- Victoria Góngora .... Helena Burke
- Flavio Peniche .... Boris
- Natalia Giraldo .... Tia Antonia
- Indhira Serrano .... Ursula
- Liliana Zalazar .... Marina
- Sergio Gonzalez .... Doctor Max
- Tiberio Cruz .... Hercules - Arturo's ex-servant, in love with Margot
- Salvador del Solar .... Arturo de Linares
- Paulo Quevedo... Vladimir
- Ricardo Saldarriaga
- Diego Camacho
- Rene Figueroa
- Tommy Vásquez
- Andrés Martínez
- Esmeralda Pinzón .... Matilde
- Tania Falquez .... Alcides' and Hugo's mother
- Bastian Madiedo
- Javier Zapata
- Cesar Vargas
- Oscar González
- Mauricio Bravo
- Sigifredo Vega
- Juan Carlos Bedoya
- Laila Viera .... Margot
- Luís Fernando Bohórquez
- Alberto Sornosa
- Juan Carlos Arboleda
- Eduardo Carreño
- Diego Giraldo

== International releases ==
Country	Alternate title/Translation	TV network(s)	Series premiere	Series finale	Weekly schedule	Timeslot
Turkey	İhanet	Star TV (Turkey)	October, 2008	2009 March	Monday to Friday (Day Change) January, 2009 Saturday Sunday	October, 2008 14:00 (Day Change) January, 2009 Saturday Sunday 13:40
Bulgaria	Предателство	bTV	August 26, 2008	January 30, 2009	Monday to Friday	13:30
Serbia	Izdaja	RTV Pink	January 26, 2009	April 28, 2009	Monday to Friday	14:00
Romania	Tradarea	Acasa TV			Monday to Friday	
Philippines	La Traicion (The Betrayal)	ABS-CBN	November 17, 2008	May 8, 2009	Monday to Friday	3:30 PM PST
USA	La Traicion	Telemundo	January 29, 2008	June 27, 2008	Monday to Friday	12:30 PM
Armenia	Դավաճանություն	Shant TV	November 22, 2009	March 18, 2010	Monday to Friday	17:00
Azerbaijan	Xəyanət	Public TV				
Spain	La traición	Nova (Spanish TV channel)	November 23, 2009	March 18, 2010	Monday to Friday	17:00
