= El Zorro, la espada y la rosa =

Television series

- Genre: Telenovela Superhero
- Created by: Humberto "Kiko" Olivieri
- Written by: Carolina Diaz; Humberto "Kiko" Olivieri; Alejandro Vergara
- Directed by: Mauricio Cruz; Agustin Restrepo
- Starring: Christian Meier; Marlene Favela; Arturo Peniche; Osvaldo Ríos; Erick Elías; Héctor Suárez Gomís; Andrea López; Harry Geithner; Jorge Cao; Natasha Klauss
- Theme music composer: Oliver Camargo; Jose Carlos Marin; Nicolás Uribe
- Opening theme: "Amor Gitano" by Alejandro Fernández and Beyoncé Knowles
- Countries of origin: Colombia; United States
- Original language: Spanish
- No. of seasons: 1
- No. of episodes: 122

Production
- Executive producers: Hugo León Ferrer; Patricio Wills
- Producer: Marlon Quintero
- Cinematography: Alfredo Zamudio; Eduardo Carreño
- Editor: Alba Merchan Hamann
- Production companies: Sony Pictures Television International; RTI Colombia; Zorro Productions, Inc.

Original release
- Network: Telemundo (USA); Caracol Televisión (Colombia)
- Release: February 12 – July 23, 2007

Related
- Zorro (1957)

El Zorro, la espada y la rosa (The Sword and the Rose) is a Spanish-language telenovela based on Johnston McCulley's characters. Telemundo aired it from February 12 to July 23, 2007. This limited-run serial shows the masked crusader as a hero torn between his fight for justice and his love for a beautiful woman. Telemundo president Don Browne called this show "without doubt the best production offered on Hispanic television in the United States today."

This series was produced by Telemundo, Sony Pictures Television International (SPTI) and RTI Colombia. This series was filmed in Colombia.

It was the network's most successful series of 2007 and its biggest seller in international syndication. Sony Pictures Television International (SPTI) has asked Telemundo to produce a sequel.

== Plot summary ==
The melodrama loosely follows the retcon of Zorro from the 2005 novel by Isabel Allende, yet also uses the major characters from the 1950s Disney series. It shows a fantastic, ahistorical version of colonial Los Angeles full of romance, royal intrigue, and witchcraft, even polygamy. The city is populated with gypsies, slaves, clerics, cannibals, conspirators, rebellious Indians and Amazon warriors, along with Spanish settlers, soldiers, pirates and mestizo peasants.

The hero, Don Diego de la Vega, adopts the secret identity of Zorro, the masked avenger. Instead of being a Spaniard, however, Diego is now a mestizo born in the 1790s to a white father, Don Alejandro de la Vega, and his wife, a Native American warrior named Toypurnia, who was given the name Regina when she married Alejandro.

Diego learned his acrobatics and fencing skills in Spain, under the tutelage of a great sword master. Remembering the injustices he saw as a child, he returned to his family's California hacienda. Now he lives as both a nobleman and a vigilante, fighting imperialist oppression. He is backed by the brotherhood of Zorro, a secret society called the Knights of the Broken Thorn.

Since this is a telenovela, much of the drama focuses on romantic melodrama and family intrigue. Here, Zorro falls in love with a beautiful young widow, Esmeralda Sánchez de Moncada. She arrives in California with her sister Mariángel Sánchez de Moncada and her father, Fernando Sánchez de Moncada, the newly appointed governor—and villainous dictator—of Los Angeles.

The hero must challenge a host of evildoers, branding them with the distinctive Zorro "Z" – made from three swift scratches. The story arc focuses on mysteries concerning Esmeralda's long-lost mother and the man whose atrocities changed Diego's life forever. Their resolution threatens to shake the Spanish Empire.

In this story Don Diego is sexually active. Much of the show spotlights the two sisters whom he allegedly impregnates outside of wedlock. One of these women is Esmeralda, who winds up imprisoned, starved and tortured. The other, Mariángel, plots to steal the de la Vega fortune

From Telemundo's promotional copy:

"At heart, Zorro is not different from other men in his need to love and to be loved, his desire to fall in love and form a family, and his ambition to find the ideal woman. Will he obtain them?"

The opening sequences show a shot of Diego looking at his mask. "Tú y yo estamos enamorados de la misma mujer," he says. The epigram translates to: "You and I are in love with the same woman."

== Episodes ==
Episode 1 The series begins with showing Esmeralda Sánchez de Moncada being forced to marry a wealthy old man by her father. The groom dies at the altar immediately after the marriage in completed. She then leaves for Los Angeles with her violent father Don Fernando, half-sister Mariángel, beloved aunt Almudena and her father's hunchbacked accountant Olmos.

In Los Angeles, Don Diego de la Vega, alias Zorro, spends the night with the local judge's daughter before leaving with one of the Judge's journals. From the journal he discovers the future arrival of a governor, Don Fernando Sánchez de Moncada. Elsewhere in the hacienda his aunt María Pía de la Vega, is horrified to learn her former fiancé, Fernando, is going to return.

Months later on the night of the welcome party for the new governor Esmeralda, choosing not to go to the party to pretend to be a loving daughter, runs into Zorro near the city prison. Their medallions got tangled and the two are forced to look into each other eyes, immediately feeling the spark.

Episode 2 Zorro and Esmeralda fight off the soldiers, escape and then separate. But they have accidentally switched medallions. Once Zorro realizes this he returns to look for Esmeralda as Diego.

In the party three couples meet each other; Diego's father Alejandro and Almudena are reacquainted, Fernando and María Pía experience an awkward face to face again moment, and Mariángel and the local police commander Montero are introduced and straight away attracted to each other.

Two Indian siblings, Yumalay and Jacó, realize that the new governor is the same man who murdered their family years ago. Including their sister, Regina, who was also Diego's mother and Alejandro's wife. Three Roma called Jonás, Azucena, and Renzo discuss Esmeralda and her mother, Sara Kalí. Unbeknownst to Esmeralda her mother, whom she knew as Mercedes, is still alive and has been locked up in the local prison ever since she gave birth to Esmeralda.

Episode 3 Esmeralda tells her aunt about the night's adventures while taking a bath. Once her aunt has left her room Zorro appears from the window. Esmeralda and Zorro soon end up in a passionate kiss and change medallions. Once Diego returns to his Zorro-cave he reflects on his feelings towards Esmeralda, while Esmeralda does the same in her home.

Fernando arrives home, disturbing Mariángel and Montero, who are locked in a passionate embrace. Both of them hide before he can see who it was. Mariángel is seen by Olmos, who is seen by Fernando. Since Olmos is in love with Mariángel, he lies to Fernando and casts suspicion upon Esmeralda. Following Fernando goes to Esmeralda's room and cruelly beats her.

Almudena doctors Esmeralda's wounds received from Fernando's beating. Esmeralda reflects that her father has inflicted deep emotional scars over the years. She does not understand why he hates her so much. Almudena tries to explain it with saying her father has suffered a lot in his life, but Esmeralda points out that he doesn't treat Mariángel the same way. Almudena is the only person who cares about her.

The gypsies find a way to communicate with Sara Kalí with the help of a rat. They tell her they've finally found her daughter and discover she is being held in the dungeons of the prison wearing an iron mask.

Esmeralda overhears her aunt and Fernando discussing and discovers he is not really her father. She returns to her room, now understanding why he hates her so much. Esmeralda picks up her medallion and remembers what she was told about her destiny. She realizes that her mother may still be alive. While taking a walk the next day she is approached by Azucena and Renzo.

Episode 4 Azucena and Renzo kidnap Esmeralda and take her to the Traveller camp and the Roma present her with flowers. When Diego learns of Esmeralda's plight, he sets out to rescue her as Zorro.

Yumalay and Jacó try to kill Fernando, but instead Jacó is killed. Fernando chases after Yumalay and briefly catches up with her. She spooks his horse with magic and flees. Fernando swears that they must find her so that he can find out why she wants to kill him. He declares that he will kill all of those savages.

Olmos tells Mariángel that he feels guilty about the events of last night. Mariángel threatens to tell her father of Olmos stealing money from him should Olmos say anything about what really happened.

Fernando is furious that Esmeralda has been abducted — furious with Esmeralda. Alejandro arrives and suggests that they form a search party. Fernando is less than enthusiastic.

== Cast ==
=== Main cast ===
- Christian Meier as Don Diego de la Vega \ Zorro main hero, known as the Zorro, Don Alejandro's son, Regina's son, Almudena's stepson, Mariangel's ex-husband, Esmeralda's husband
- Marlene Favela as Esmeralda Sánchez de Moncada main heroine, Mercedes' daughter, Fernando's stepdaughter, Mariangel's half-sister, Almudena's niece, Ricardo's ex-wife, Don Diego's wife
- Vilma Vera as Hermana Carola sister of Almudena, aunt of Bernardo and Diego
- Arturo Peniche as Fernando Sánchez de Moncada antagonistic protagonist, later good. Governor, Mariángel's father, Esmeralda's stepfather, in love with Maria Pia
- Osvaldo Ríos as Don Alejandro de la Vega Military General, Don Diego's father, Esmeralda's father-in-law, Almudena's husband
- Erick Elías as Renzo Roma, in love with Esmeralda, later with Ana Camila
- Héctor Suárez Gomís as Capitán Anibal Pizarro Military Captain, Ricardo's accomplice, villain, in love with Catalina
- Andrea López as Mariángel Sánchez de Moncada not capable of love, second most evil villain, obsessed with Don Diego, Ricardo's lover
- Harry Geithner as Comandante Ricardo Montero de Avila Military Commander, enemy of "Zorro", most evil villain, obsessed with Esmeralda, Mariangel's lover
- Jorge Cao as Padre Tomás Villarte priest, mentor of Zorro, secretly in love with Maria Pia
- Natasha Klauss as Sor Ana Camila Suplicios troubled nun, in love with Renzo
- César Mora as Sargento Juvenal Garcia sergeant, very fond of alcohol. This character is based on the Sergeant Garcia from Disney's 1950s television series.
- Luly Bossa as Almudena Sánchez de Moncada sister of Fernando, aunt of Esmeralda and Mariángel, wife of Don Alejandro
- Raúl Gutierrez as Olmos Berroterran de la Guardia hunchback, Fernando's secretary, villain, in love with Mariangel
- Andrea Montenegro as María Pía de la Vega sister of Don Alejandro, in love with Fernando
- Ricardo González as Bernardo mute, manservant of Don Diego
- Luigi Ayacardi as Tobias del Valle y Campos dandy
- Germán Rojas as Jonás Traveller, father of Renzo
- Ana Bolena Meza as Sara Kalí / Mercedes Mayorga de Aragon mother of Esmeralda, Fernando's ex-wife
- Adriana Campos as Yumalay / Guadalupe - Toypurnia / Regina de la Vega Indian, in love with Don Alejandro / Deceased wife of Don Alejandro and mother of Don Diego.
- Margarita Giraldo as Azucena Roma, mother of Renzo
- Marilyn Patiño as Catalina Tobias del Valle y Campos' wife, Pizarro's lover, Mariángel's friend
- Juan Pablo Barragán as Mambo Cristian de Castellón gipsy, brother of Duque
- Natalia Bedoya as Laisha Romani, wife of Miguel
- Talú Quintero as Ramona Jacinto's sister
- Carmen Marina Torres as Dolores (probably a slave) nanny of Don Diego

=== Supporting cast ===
- Talu Quintero
- Jose Saldarriaga
- Fernando Corridor
- Alberto Saavedra
- Orlando Valenzuela .... Miguel - gypsy
- David Noreña
- Alejandro Tamayo
- Catalina Vela
- Alejandra Guzmán
- Lina Angarita
- Adriana Martin
- Nicolas Niño
- Anderson Barbosa
- Jesus David Forero
- Mauricio Bravo
- Jaime Rayo
- Julian Alvarez
- Gabriel Gonzalez
- Ivelyn Giró .... María Luísa Burgos de Castilla - Queen of Spain
- Teresa Gutiérrez .... La Marquesa Carmen Santillana de la Roquette - the Marquessa
- Didier van der Hove .... Santiago Michelena - friend of Diego, ex-lover of Mariángel
- El Francés .... Tornado - Zorro's horse
- Valentina Acosta .... Selenia

=== Supporting characters ===
- Aaron, the exorcist
- Agapito, the barber/surgeon/undertaker
- Aguirre, the soldier
- Alejandro, Elena and Fernanda, children
- Alfonso, the suitor
- Camba, the slave
- Catalina, Mariángel's friend
- Don Enrique de Castilla y León - King of Spain
- Fulgencio, the soldier
- Hermes, the prisoner
- Jacobo Almagro de Castellón, Duke of Albatroz
- Javier, the gypsy
- Juan, the guard of horses
- Judge Quintana
- Leroy, the soldier
- Macario, the soldier
- Maestro Abelardo Samaniego de Villarte
- Mejias, the soldier
- Miguel, the gypsy
- la mujer de la rosa (the lady of the rose)
- Selenia, the witch
- The Kala-Kala, a tribe of cannibals
- White Buffalo, the grandmother of Diego

== Production ==
Zorro began filming on November 8, 2006, in Bogotá, Villa de Leyva and Cartagena, Colombia. Telemundo and RTI Colombia developed the show with Sony Pictures Television International (SPTI), while CPT Holdings is listed as copyright holder. Venezuelan screenwriter Humberto "Kiko" Olivieri, a fan of Disney's Zorro, developed the story. Cardinal Olivieri, a supporting character on the show, has the same last name.

Telemundo aired this novela with English subtitles on the default closed captioning channel, CC1. The network normally broadcast translations on CC3, which is not available on many older TV sets. It also expanded two weeks of March episodes to 90 minutes and several episodes in May were extended to 75 and 90 minutes.

On June 22, Telemundo announced Zorro is in its final chapters. After the July 23 finale, La Esclava Isaura expanded into its time slot. This series is also known as Zorro: La Telenovela and Zorro: La Novela.

=== Changes ===
The originally-announced storyline began with Don Diego as the protege of a great English knight, Sir Edmund Kendel. He returns home to California to find his land under dictatorship, then taking up Zorro's mantle. When the show aired, it was the Moncada family that arrived in California, with Esmeralda having become a rich widow.

== Theme song ==
Beyoncé and Alejandro Fernández performed "Amor Gitano" ("Gypsy Love"), a flamenco-pop track commissioned by Sony for the series. According to the label's translation, Fernández sings, "I'm your gypsy, your pilgrim. I'm your thief, I'm going to love you even if they tear my heart out." Since Beyoncé does not speak Spanish, she sang the lyrics phonetically. The single hit number one on Spain's singles chart.

== International airings ==
Zorro averaged 635,000 core viewers during March 2007 on Telemundo. The audience jumped 28 percent from February in the network's key demographic, Hispanic adults from age 18 to 49. Overall, the show has had Nielsen ratings of around 0.6, with a 1 share. The network considered expanding the serial's run, but decided against it.

Zorro has been sold to broadcasters in 43 countries. Telemundo and Sony split the international rights, with Sony holding the rights for Latin America. On February 26, 2007, the show started airing in Colombia on Caracol TV.

In Romania, Zorro debuted on Acasa TV on March 5, 2007. The pilot episode aired with hard English subtitles in the USA on Universal HD. It premiered in Argentina on March 26, 2007, on Telefé.

In Spain, the telenovela aired on Antena 3TV weekdays at 16hrs from Monday 27 April 2007 where it achieved moderate success in the tough "second Primetime" afternoon slot.

In Brazil, the telenovela debuted on May 28, 2007, at TV Record, dubbed in brazilian portuguese.

In the Philippines, Zorro aired on ABS-CBN's Hapontastic line up from September 10, 2007 to March 19, 2008 replacing Inocente de ti and was replaced by El Cuerpo aired weekday afternoon at 3 pm (later moved to 3:30 pm).

In Puerto Rico, the telenovela officially started airing on Telemundo on October 2, 2007, and in Finland on January 10, 2008, Nelonen

In Lithuania, the telenovela started in January, 2008.

In Bulgaria, the telenovela officially started airing on April 15, 2008, on BTV and started airing on October 9, 2012, on bTV Lady.

In Serbia, the telenovela officially started airing on June 23, 2008, on RTV Pink.

In Hungary: August 25, 2008

In Poland since September 1, 2008 on TV Puls

In People's Republic of China:since October 31, 2008 on CCTV-8

In Slovenia, started on November 3, 2010, on POP TV
