= Decisiones =

Colombian-American telenovela

- Directed by: Miguel Varoni, Leonardo Aranguibel, Luis Manzo,
- Countries of origin: Colombia; United States
- Original language: Spanish
- No. of episodes: 323

Production
- Executive producer: Jose V Scheuren
- Producer: Marcos Vanezca
- Production locations: Miami, Florida
- Camera setup: Multi-camera
- Production company: Cinemat Inc

Original release
- Network: Telemundo
- Release: May 9, 2005 – 2007

Decisiones (Spanish pronunciation: [desiˈsjones], Decisions) is a Telemundo-produced Spanish-language television anthology of steamy melodramas about passion and sex in the modern world. The hour-long series features impassioned people thrust into amorous adventures and pushed to their breaking points. Unlike much Spanish-language dramatic fare, each show contains a complete story.

According to Telemundo, these fervid tales are "inspired by real-life cases of everyday heroes". The network bills the show as a mix of drama and reality. Telemundo also broadcast English subtitles of many episodes as closed captions on CC3.

== Overview ==
Decisiones' first aired on Telemundo from May 9 to August 8, 2005 with Candela Ferro hosting. It returned to the prime-time schedule from September 26, 2005 to April 13, 2007, when it made room for the serial Sin Vergüenza ("No Shame"). A third run began in daytime on August 22, 2007 with the title Decisiones de mujeres (Decisions of Women) hosted by Rashel Diaz.

On September 4, 2007, a 50-episode season of Decisiones began production in Puerto Rico by a division of Telemundo, Telemundo of Puerto Rico Studios. The season debuted on November 12, 2007, hosted by Cynthia Olavarria. As of April, 2008, over 500 episodes of this series had been produced.

Spanish TV buffs sometimes derisively refer to this show as "Sexiciones," due to what they consider crass, excessive eroticism.

It is currently in reruns on Universo (TV channel) in the U.S.
