= Pasión de Gavilanes season 2 =

Pasión de Gavilanes
- Season 2
- Starring: Mario Cimarro; Danna García; Juan Alfonso Baptista; Paola Rey; Natasha Klauss; Zharick León
- No. of episodes: 71

Release
- Original network: Telemundo
- Original release: 14 February – 31 May 2022

The second and final season of the Colombian telenovela Pasión de Gavilanes takes place 20 years after the events of the first season, that aired in 2003. The season is produced by Telemundo Global Studios and CMO Producciones.

The season was announced on May 12, 2021, at Telemundo's upfront for the 2021-2022 television season. The season stars an ensemble cast featuring Danna García, Mario Cimarro, Juan Alfonso Baptista, Natasha Klauss, Paola Rey, and Zharick León, with Michel Brown in a guest role.

The season premiered on 14 February 2022 on Telemundo. It concluded on 31 May 2022.

== Plot ==
Twenty years after the events of the previous season, the Reyes-Elizondo family are forced to face new challenges that threaten their family. The murder of professor Genaro Carreño, shakes the family as evidence points to the sons of Juan and Norma as the culprits. Tensions continue to grow with the arrival of Samuel Caballero (Sergio Goyri), a powerful and cruel man who will not hesitate to do whatever it takes to get back his daughter and his wife, Rosario Montes (Zharick León), whose return to San Marcos has caught everyone's attention.

== Cast ==
=== Main ===
- Mario Cimarro as Juan Reyes Guerrero
- Danna García as Norma Elizondo Acevedo
- Juan Alfonso Baptista as Óscar Reyes Guerrero
- Paola Rey as Jimena Elizondo Acevedo
- Natasha Klauss as Sara "Sarita" Elizondo Acevedo
- Zharick León as Rosario Montes
- Bernardo Flores as Juan David Reyes
- Camila Rojas as Muriel Caballero
- Juan Manuel Restrepo as León Reyes
- Sebastián Osorio as Erick Reyes
- Yare Santana as Gaby Reyes
- Jerónimo Cantillo as Andrés Reyes
- Ángel de Miguel as Albín Duarte
- Alejandro López as Demetrio Jurado
- Germán Quintero as Martín Acevedo
- Kristina Lilley as Gabriela Acevedo de Elizondo
- Boris Schoemann as Pablo Gunter
- Katherine Porto as Romina Clemente

=== Recurring ===
- Carmenza González as Quintina Canosa
- Tatiana Jáuregui as Dominga
- Constanza Hernández as Panchita López
- Jacobo Montalvo as Duván Clemente
- Jonathan Bedoya as Nino Barcha
- Sebastián Vega
- Valeria Caicedo as Sibila
- Álvaro García

=== Guest stars ===
- Michel Brown as Franco Reyes Guerrero
- Sergio Goyri as Samuel Caballero

== Episodes ==
| No. overall | No. in season | Title | Original release date | U.S. viewers (millions) |
|---|---|---|---|---|
| 189 | 1 | "Más allá de una amenaza" | 14 February 2022 | 1.03 |
| 190 | 2 | "Tras el enemigo" | 15 February 2022 | 0.92 |
| 191 | 3 | "Amor en peligro" | 16 February 2022 | 0.84 |
| 192 | 4 | "Un deseo en juego" | 17 February 2022 | 0.91 |
| 193 | 5 | "Ultimátum" | 18 February 2022 | 1.00 |
| 194 | 6 | "Presentimiento" | 21 February 2022 | 0.87 |
| 195 | 7 | "La tormenta del pasado" | 22 February 2022 | 0.91 |
| 196 | 8 | "Víctima de la manipulación" | 23 February 2022 | 0.91 |
| 197 | 9 | "Pasión encendida" | 24 February 2022 | 0.83 |
| 198 | 10 | "Dónde está Adela" | 25 February 2022 | 0.81 |
| 199 | 11 | "Ataque a los Reyes" | 28 February 2022 | 0.87 |
| 200 | 12 | "Encuentro explosivo" | 2 March 2022 | 0.76 |
| 201 | 13 | "Culpables o inocentes" | 3 March 2022 | 0.77 |
| 202 | 14 | "El punto de la discordia" | 4 March 2022 | 0.75 |
| 203 | 15 | "Peligrosa curiosidad" | 7 March 2022 | 0.80 |
| 204 | 16 | "Un impacto del destino" | 8 March 2022 | 0.71 |
| 205 | 17 | "Emociones a flor de piel" | 9 March 2022 | 0.74 |
| 206 | 18 | "Crisis de nervios" | 10 March 2022 | 0.79 |
| 207 | 19 | "Expuestas al peligro" | 11 March 2022 | 0.79 |
| 208 | 20 | "Obsesionada" | 14 March 2022 | 0.72 |
| 209 | 21 | "Como la primera vez" | 15 March 2022 | 0.79 |
| 210 | 22 | "La zozobra" | 16 March 2022 | 0.77 |
| 211 | 23 | "Revancha inminente" | 17 March 2022 | 0.70 |
| 212 | 24 | "Al tope de la ansiedad" | 18 March 2022 | 0.81 |
| 213 | 25 | "Una prueba contundente" | 21 March 2022 | 0.79 |
| 214 | 26 | "Miedo a perderla" | 22 March 2022 | 0.64 |
| 215 | 27 | "Una verdadera loba" | 23 March 2022 | 0.77 |
| 216 | 28 | "Juan marca territorio" | 24 March 2022 | 0.79 |
| 217 | 29 | "Pánico en San Marcos" | 25 March 2022 | 0.70 |
| 218 | 30 | "Tensiones desatadas" | 28 March 2022 | 0.69 |
| 219 | 31 | "Loca por dominarla" | 29 March 2022 | 0.69 |
| 220 | 32 | "Atormentado" | 30 March 2022 | 0.69 |
| 221 | 33 | "Fiera herida" | 31 March 2022 | 0.80 |
| 222 | 34 | "Un abismo entre los dos" | 1 April 2022 | 0.84 |
| 223 | 35 | "Vulnerable" | 4 April 2022 | 0.69 |
| 224 | 36 | "Revelación fulminante" | 5 April 2022 | 0.63 |
| 225 | 37 | "Fuera de control" | 6 April 2022 | 0.68 |
| 226 | 38 | "Entre tú y yo" | 7 April 2022 | 0.67 |
| 227 | 39 | "Imparable" | 8 April 2022 | 0.65 |
| 228 | 40 | "La visita del demonio" | 11 April 2022 | 0.63 |
| 229 | 41 | "Temblando de ira" | 12 April 2022 | 0.71 |
| 230 | 42 | "Desconcertada" | 14 April 2022 | 0.60 |
| 231 | 43 | "Ofensiva mortal" | 15 April 2022 | 0.57 |
| 232 | 44 | "Engaño catastrófico" | 18 April 2022 | 0.71 |
| 233 | 45 | "Mortificados" | 19 April 2022 | 0.79 |
| 234 | 46 | "Tras el acosador" | 20 April 2022 | 0.87 |
| 235 | 47 | "Objetivo fatal" | 22 April 2022 | 0.73 |
| 236 | 48 | "En busca del atacante" | 25 April 2022 | 0.70 |
| 237 | 49 | "Acorralado por la mentira" | 26 April 2022 | 0.85 |
| 238 | 50 | "La venganza de Romina" | 27 April 2022 | 0.71 |
| 239 | 51 | "En busca de una reconciliación" | 28 April 2022 | 0.78 |
| 240 | 52 | "Víctima de un hostigamiento" | 29 April 2022 | 0.64 |
| 241 | 53 | "Ataque cruel" | 2 May 2022 | 0.74 |
| 242 | 54 | "Alma envenenada" | 3 May 2022 | 0.74 |
| 243 | 55 | "Irremplazable" | 4 May 2022 | 0.80 |
| 244 | 56 | "El secreto de Franco" | 5 May 2022 | 0.69 |
| 245 | 57 | "Al borde del suplicio" | 6 May 2022 | 0.66 |
| 246 | 58 | "Un arriesgado rescate" | 11 May 2022 | 0.72 |
| 247 | 59 | "Estremecida" | 13 May 2022 | 0.58 |
| 248 | 60 | "El destino de Rosario" | 16 May 2022 | 0.65 |
| 249 | 61 | "Un retorno conmovedor" | 17 May 2022 | 0.74 |
| 250 | 62 | "El precio de una ausencia" | 18 May 2022 | 0.68 |
| 251 | 63 | "Los temores de Franco" | 19 May 2022 | 0.81 |
| 252 | 64 | "Anhelado encuentro" | 20 May 2022 | 0.71 |
| 253 | 65 | "Emociones desbordadas" | 23 May 2022 | 0.81 |
| 254 | 66 | "Un intenso reencuentro" | 24 May 2022 | 0.78 |
| 255 | 67 | "Batalla indetenible" | 25 May 2022 | 0.80 |
| 256 | 68 | "Sensación inevitable" | 26 May 2022 | 0.77 |
| 257 | 69 | "La valentía de Norma" | 27 May 2022 | 0.65 |
| 258 | 70 | "Confesiones" | 30 May 2022 | 0.63 |
| 259 | 71 | "Un secreto de amor" | 31 May 2022 | 0.86 |

== Production ==
=== Development ===
On 12 May 2021, Telemundo announced that it would be reviving Pasión de Gavilanes for a second season. Filming of the season began on 18 October 2021, and concluded in March 2022.

=== Casting ===
The complete cast was confirmed on 18 October 2021, with Danna García, Mario Cimarro, Juan Alfonso Baptista, Natasha Klauss, Paola Rey, Zharick León, Kristina Lilley, Carmenza González, and Tatiana Jáuregui returning from the first season. Michel Brown initially declined to return for the second season, however, in November 2021, it was confirmed that he would be reprising his role of Franco Reyes.

=== Marketing ===
To promote the new season, Telemundo began to show re-runs of the first season weekday afternoons beginning on 9 August 2021. On 19 January 2022, Telemundo released the first official trailer for the season.
