= La Baby Sister =

- Genre: Telenovela; Comedy drama
- Written by: Ana María Londoño; Jörg Hiller; Camila Misas
- Directed by: Juan Pablo Posada; Andrés Marroquín
- Music by: "Dímelo" by Marc Anthony
- Opening theme: "Dímelo" by Marc Anthony
- Ending theme: "Dímelo" by Marc Anthony
- Country of origin: Colombia
- Original language: Spanish
- No. of episodes: 161

Production
- Producer: Dago García
- Production location: Colombia
- Production company: Caracol Televisión

Original release
- Network: Caracol Televisión
- Release: 25 September 2000 – 14 September 2001

La baby sister is a Colombian telenovela made by Teleset for the Canal Caracol in the year 2000. Its protagonists were played by Paola Rey and Víctor Mallarino and its antagonists by Marcela Gallego and Manuela González.

The recordings of the telenovela began on June 12, 2000 and ended on January 26, 2001, and it premiered on September 25, 2000.

== Plot summary ==
Daniel Luna and his wife Martha Parejo (played by Marcela Gallego) are a successful and semi-famous couple living among Bogota's upper crust society. They work in the same office, where Martha is a celebrity marriage counselor/television personality (much like Dr. Phil in America), and Daniel is a lawyer and professor specializing in divorce law. In the opening episode, Martha is about to release her newest book, which is an exaltation of her ostensibly perfect marriage. Martha's reputation as a counselor is built on honest and straightforward communication between couples. In one chapter of her book— a chapter highlighted by the book's publisher— Martha states that Daniel was often sexually inadequate, but that they have managed to overcome his inadequacies and build a successful marriage based on trust and honesty. However, both trust and honesty crumble for the celebrity couple when Daniel, who has not yet read Martha's newest book, discovers that the entire nation of Colombia believes he is sexually inadequate, which (the directors of the novela imply through various sex scenes) is not true.

Martha's book release has a pernicious effect on their marriage, which begins to crumble after Martha finds out that Daniel had a brief sexual encounter with one of his students, Veronica Davila (played by Manuela Gonzalez), who is infatuated with Daniel and who, as the viewers gradually find out, is insane.

During the same time period, the Lunas have hired Fabiana Rivera (played by Paola Rey), a beautiful twenty-one-year-old college student, to help them take care of their two children. Fabiana is from a lower-class family, and she is dazzled by the Luna's rich style of living and by the charm of her new boss, Daniel. As Martha and Daniel's relationship continues to deteriorate, the two decide to separate, and Daniel increasingly comes to rely on Fabiana to help him cope with raising his children while separating from his wife. Fabiana and Daniel fall in love, and after sharing various furtive kisses (accompanied by feelings of guilt and confusion), they culminate their romance sexually in a hotel.

Fabiana and Daniel make plans to run away together, but their plans are shattered when Martha, distraught because her separation from Daniel has become a national scandal fueled by the gossip driven media, accidentally overdoses on anti-depressants. Daniel mistakenly believes that his wife tried to commit suicide, and Martha does nothing to disabuse him of the belief in hopes that his feelings of guilt will help save their marriage.

The sexual consummation between Fabiana and Daniel, followed almost immediately by Martha's overdose, takes place during the first third of the novela's 160 episodes, and the rest of the narrative arch involves Daniel struggling between his love for Fabiana and the desire not to hurt his family, and Fabiana's doomed attempts to forget about Daniel. Fabiana continues to work in the Luna household for a time (where she continues to have brief romantic encounters with Daniel), but she leaves after Martha discovers that she and Daniel slept together. Fabiana and Daniel separate, and Fabiana briefly gets engaged to her childhood friend, Edwin Paipa (played by Luis Fernando Salis). But neither she nor Daniel can overcome their illicit love for one another. In the end, the two protagonists cast aside social restrictions against their relationship and the objections of their respective friends and families, and get married.

== Success and Availability of La Baby Sister ==
La Baby Sister aired successfully in several Latin American countries. It enjoyed a successful run in America as well, though it seems unlikely that Telemundo, or any other network, will air the series again. It is, however, available for sale on the internet in the form of unauthorized DVDs, an illicit market that gives many telenovelas a second life after their initial broadcasts. Many of the actors in the novella continued to work together on other projects following La Baby Sister, and the main star, Paola Rey, starred in three more telenovelas broadcasts on Telemundo, including La mujer en el espejo, Amores de mercado, and Pasión de Gavilanes.

== Cast ==
- Paola Rey ... Fabiana Rivera
- Víctor Mallarino ... Daniel Luna
- Marcela Gallego ... Marta Parejo
- Víctor Hugo Cabrera ... Reinaldo
- Nórida Rodríguez ... Leticia
- Patricia Grisales ... Roselia de Rivera
- Hugo Gómez ... Fidel Rivera
- Astrid Hernández ... Angie
- Sebastián Sánchez ... Giovanny Rivera
- Cecilia Navia ... Pili Guaquetá
- Manuela González ... Verónica Dávila
- Carolina Sarmiento .... Mireya
- Andrés Felipe Martínez ... Jorge Camargo
- Ernesto Benjumea ... Roberto Villa
- Alberto Saavedra ... Mr. Paipa
- Luis Fernando Salas ... Edwin Paipa
- María Margarita Giraldo ... Ofelia
- Manuel Busquets ... Manuel Parejo
- Isabel Campos ... Elena de Parejo
- Manuela Bolívar ... Valentina Luna
- Jeofrey Roffell ... Vicente Luna
- Ana María Abello ... Catalina 'Cata'
- Darío Acosta ... Kendall
- Félix Antequera ... Johnny
- Anderson Balsero ... Comanche
- Saín Castro ... Emiliano Rivera
- Maurizio Konde ... Driver
- Humberto Dorado ... Dr. Vargas
- Tita Duarte ... Mrs. Paipa
- Raúl Gutiérrez ... Dr. Acuña, abogado
- Mauricio Figueroa ... Omar 'The Enlightened'
- Diana Hare ... Inés
- Flavio León
- Ramiro Meneses ... José Gabriel
- Alejandra Miranda ... Isabel
- Angelly Moncayo ... Sofía Pelvis
- Edgardo Román ... Dr. Andrés Posada
- Juan David Sánchez ... Chachán Rivera
- Adriana Vera ... Dr. Luisa
- Adrian Sayari Sanchez Coccaro ... Watchman

== Technical sheet ==
- General Production: Juana Uribe
- Address: Andrés Marroquín / Juan Pablo Posada
- Original Idea: Juana Uribe
- Scripts: Ana María Londoño / Jörg Hiller / Camila Misas
- Executive Production: Andrés Posada
- Director of Photography: Javier Garzón / Rafael Puentes
- Art Direction: German Lizarralde / Diego Guarnizo / Felipe Sánchez
- Edition: Isabel Cristina Méndez / Marcela Vásquez / Rafael Pinaud
- Casting: Liliana García
- Original Music: Nicolas Uribe
