= María Dalmazzo =

Colombian actress

Maria Dalmazzo
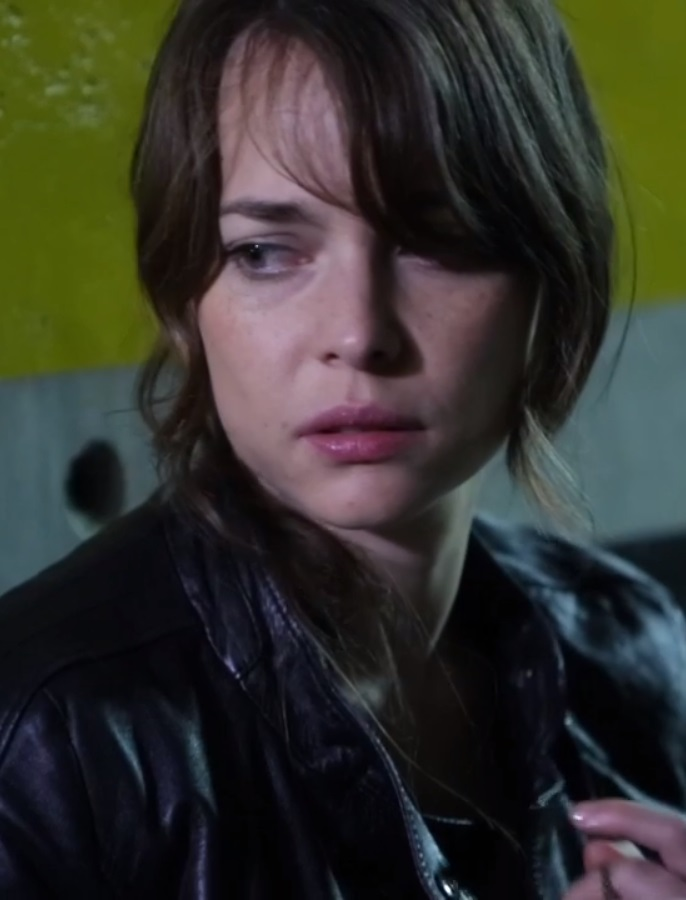
- Born: October 5, 1983 (age 42); Valparaiso, Chile
- Occupation: Actress
- Notable work: Apatía "Una Película de Carretera", Paulina, Diástole

Maria Dalmazzo (born October 5, 1983) is a Colombian actress.

== Early life and education ==
Maria Dalmazzo was born in Valparaíso, Chile, daughter of a Chilean/Italian father and a Colombian mother, the last of two siblings. When she was five years old, they moved to Pereira, Colombia, where she lived for several years at a zoo where her father was the resident head veterinarian. She studied there. When she turned 11, she decided to start studying Dramatic Arts in the after-class schedule. Simultaneously, she began working in advertising as a teen model. She also began to study musical theory and took up various instruments, such as guitar and violin. At 14, she took an interest in producing and writing plays for the school drama class, and three years later she worked in El Valle de las Sombras, a theatrical piece that would take her on a national tour.

== Career ==
Upon high school graduation, she studied environmental engineering. Shortly before finishing her undergraduate program she decided to leave not only school but also the city, and then she moved to Bogotá where, three days after her arrival, she started working in advertising, modelling and doing locutions. She worked in several ad campaigns for Colgate, Neutrogena, Johnson & Johnson, Lancôme, Sony, and more. She also made movie dubs. She worked with Disney Latin America doing Meet & Greets along all the southern continent, voiced over several documentaries and has been the voice for important products in Colombia.

== Films ==
- 2010: Apatía "Una Película de Carretera"
- 2010: Paulina
- 2009: Diástole
- 2008: A Solas

== Television ==
- 2012: Pobres Rico
- 2011: Kdabra2
- 2010: Kdabra
- 2010: La Magia de Sofia
- 2010: A Corazón Abierto
- 2008–2009: La Sub30
- 2006–2007: Historias de Hombres Sólo Para Mujeres
- 2004: La Mujer en el Espejo
- 2002: Juan Joyita
- 2000–2005: Así es la Vida
- 2000: Programa Coctel

== Theatre ==
- 2007: Lujuria
- 2003: El Sardinero
- 2000–2002: El Valle de las Sombras
