= Natasha Klauss =

Actress and businesswoman (born 1975)

- Klauss in 2024
- Born: Natasha Alexandra Rastapkevicius Arrondo; 25 June 1976 (age 50); Cali, Valle del Cauca, Colombia
- Occupations: Actress; businesswoman
- Years active: 1996-present
- Height: 1.60 m (5 ft 3 in)
- Children: 2
- Parent(s): Víctor Rastapkavičius and Susana Arrondo

Natasha Alexandra Rastapkavičius Arrondo (Russian: Наташа Александра Растапкавичюс Аррондо; born 25 June 1976), professionally known as Natasha Klauss, is a Colombian actress and businesswoman of Uruguayan and Lithuanian descent, best known for her roles in Telemundo telenovelas La Venganza, Pasión de Gavilanes, El Zorro, la espada y la rosa and La Tormenta.

== Early life ==
Natasha Klauss was born in Cali, Colombia and raised in Barranquilla, Atlántico, Colombia to a Uruguayan father of Lithuanian–Russian descent and a Uruguayan mother. She has an older sister, Tatiana. Klauss originally aspired to be a ballerina dancer after taking lessons, dreaming of performing in the Bolshoi Theatre. One year before her graduation, however, she injured her knee in a car accident, ending her career in dance. Natasha then decided to study acting instead of dancing.

== Career ==
Klauss began her acting career in television series and plays, portraying small roles mostly. In 2002 Klauss portrayed a lesbian Sandra Guzmán in the Telemundo telenovela La Venganza, co–starring Gabriela Španić and Catherine Siachoque; she won prestigious awards such as Premios Mara de Venezuela and TVyNovelas Award for Best Supporting Actress for her portrayal. Klauss then starred alongside Michel Brown, Danna García, Paola Rey, Mario Cimarro and Juan Alfonso Baptista in hit telenovela Pasión de Gavilanes, which brought her numerous awards — including ACE Award for Best Supporting Actress. In 2004 she once again starred with Paola Rey and Juan Alfonso Baptista in telenovela La Mujer en el Espejo.

In 2005, Klauss won a Premio TVyNovelas for Best Antagonist for her role in La Tormenta, with Natalia Streignard and Christian Meier, and began acting in 2005–07 series Decisiones. She appeared in 2007 telenovela Zorro: La Espada y la Rosa, starring Christian Meier and Marlene Favela, and produced by Telemundo and RTI. The following year Klauss appeared in series Novia para Dos.

== Personal life ==
In 2000, Klauss married the television producer, Víctor Gómez. In April 2000, she gave birth to the couple's first child, a girl, whom they called Isabel Gómez Rastapkevicius. The couple divorced in 2001. In 2003, she married her first cousin, Marcelo Greco. In April 2009, she gave birth to her second child and first child with Greco, whom they called Paloma Greco. They divorced in 2012. Since 2020, Klauss is in a relationship with Daniel Gómez. On 28 December 2020, Klauss announced on her Instagram account that she and Gómez are engaged. They got married on 17 June 2022.

== Filmography ==
=== Television ===
| Year | Title | Character | Notes |
|---|---|---|---|
| 1996 | Señora Bonita | Girl | Cameo |
| 1996 | Cazados | Laura Alicia Pérez | |
| 1997 | Prisioneros del Amor | Girl | Cameo |
| 1998 | Corazón Prohibido | Girl | Cameo |
| 2000 | La Caponera | Amparito | |
| 2000 | Entre Amores | Graciela | |
| 2002 | María Madrugada | Aida | |
| 2002-2003 | La Venganza | Sandra Guzmán | |
| 2003-2022 | Pasión de Gavilanes | Sara "Sarita" Elizondo Acevedo | |
| 2004-2005 | La mujer en el espejo | Luzmila Arrebatos | |
| 2005-2007 | Decisiones] | Liliana | |
| 2005 | La Tormenta | Isabela Montilla | |
| 2007 | Zorro: La Espada y la Rosa | Sor Ana Camila Suplicios | |
| 2008 | Novia para dos | Tania Toquica Murillo | |
| 2008 | Mujeres asesinas | Olga | Episode 11: "La portera" |
| 2009 | El último matrimonio feliz | Marcela de Pizarro | |
| 2009-2010 | Amor en custodia | Sandra Estrada | |
| 2010 | Tierra de cantores | Carmen Moscote | |
| 2011 | Los herederos Del Monte | Berta Soto | |
| 2011 | Confidencial | Ángela Guarín | Episode: "De vuelta a la vida" |
| 2011-2012 | Corazón de fuego | Alejandra Vivanco / Lucía Vasquez | |
| 2013 | El Control | Lucía | |
| 2013-2014 | Mentiras perfectas | Alicia María Rivera | |
| 2015 | Anónima | Adriana Vanegas | |
| 2016 | The White Slave | Ana de Granados | |
| 2017 | Alias J.J | Ana María Solozábal | |
| 2017-2018 | Hermanos y hermanas | Sara Soto Matiz | |
| 2018-2019 | La ley del corazón | Judge | Special Guest |
| 2019 | El Barón | Carla Sánchez | |
| 2019 | El Bronx | Sarah de Noriega | |
| 2019 | Bolívar | Emma | Special Guest |
| 2019 | La casa de colores | Angélica | |
| 2020 | Decisiones: Unos ganan, otros pierden | Marta Benítez | Episode 21: "Indigna justicia" |
| 2020 | Operación pacífico | Judge Amalia | |
| 2021 | Así es la vuelta | Adela | |
| 2024 | Rojo carmesí | Paulina | |

== Awards and nominations ==
| Year | Award | Category | For | Result |
|---|---|---|---|---|
| 2003 | Premio Mara de Venezuela | Best Supporting Actress | La Venganza | Won |
| 2004 | Premio TVyNovelas | Best Supporting Actress | La Venganza | Won |
| 2004 | Premio TVyNovelas | Best Supporting Actress | Pasión de Gavilanes | Nominated |
| 2004 | Premios ACE | Best Supporting Actress | Pasión de Gavilanes | Won |
| 2004 | Orquidea de Oro | Best Actress | Pasión de Gavilanes | Won |
| 2004 | Premios Dos de Oro | Best International Actress | Pasión de Gavilanes | Won |
| 2006 | Premio TVyNovelas | Best Antagonist | La Tormenta | Won |
| 2006 | Premio TVyNovelas | Best Supporting Actress | La mujer en el espejo | Nominated |
