= Mario Cimarro =

Cuban actor

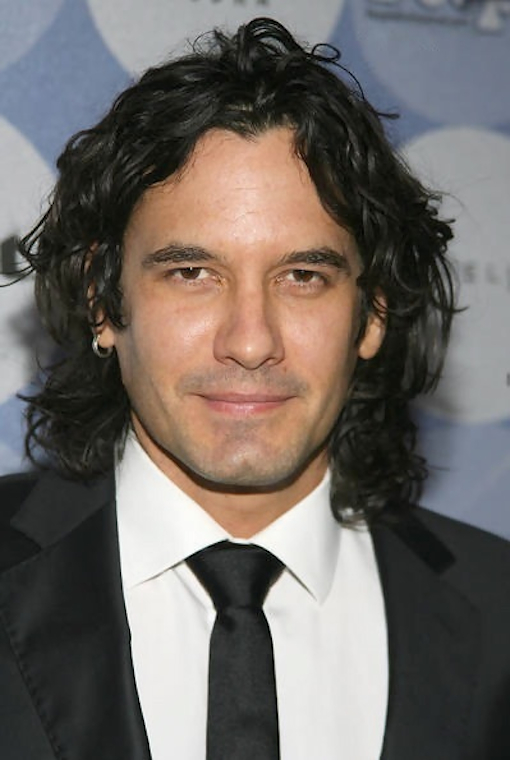
- Cimarro in 2012
- Born: Mario Antonio Cimarro Paz; June 1, 1971 (age 55); Havana, Cuba
- Occupation: Actor
- Years active: 1992-present

Mario Antonio Cimarro Paz (born June 1, 1971) is a Cuban actor. His television career began in the late 1990s and solidified in the early 2000s with leading roles in dramatic productions.

His portrayal of Juan Reyes in the Colombian telenovela Pasión de Gavilanes (2003) was a key moment in his career, earning him international recognition. Previously, he had a supporting role in La Usurpadora (1998) and starred in Gata Salvaje (2002).

Throughout his career, Cimarro has continued to appear in various productions, with Pasión de Gavilanes being one of his most notable works.

== Biography ==
Mario Antonio Cimarro Paz was born on June 1, 1971, in Havana, Cuba. He is the son of Antonio Luis Cimarro and María Caridad Paz. He has a sister, named María Antonia Cimarro Paz.

== Career ==
He made his big screen debut in 1995 in Acapulco, cuerpo y alma.

In 1996, he made the theatrical seasons of Romeo y Julieta.

From 2003 to 2004, he was the Main role of the Colombian television series Pasión de Gavilanes with Natasha Klauss, Michel Brown, Juan Alfonso Baptista, Danna García and Paola Rey.

From 2005 to 2006, he was the Main role of the television series El Cuerpo del Deseo with Lorena Rojas.

He had a recurring role on the USA Network's Necessary Roughness (2011–2013) and Jesus Cristo de Nazaret (2020).

In August 2019, he traveled to Paraguay to be part of the jury staff for the eighth season of the program Baila conmigo Paraguay.

In 2021, it is confirmed that the actor will give reprise his role of Juan Reyes Guerrero in the second season of Pasión de Gavilanes.

In 2023, Cimarro took part in Slovak rendition of Dancing with the Stars named Let's Dance with Vanda Poláková as his partner.

== Telenovelas ==
Year	Title	Character	Note
1995	Acapulco, cuerpo y alma	Ali	Guest star
1996	Sentimientos Ajenos	Ramiro	
1997	Gente bien	Gerardo Felipe	Main role
1997	Esmeralda	Hector	Guest star
1998	La usurpadora	Luciano Alcántara	
1998	La mujer de mi vida	Antonio Adolfo Thompson Reyes	Main role
2000	La casa en la playa	Roberto Villarreal	Co-Main role
2000	Amor latino	Ignacio "Nacho" Domeq	Main role
2001	Más que amor, frenesí	Santiago Guerrero	Main role
2002	Gata Salvaje	Luis Mario Arismendi	Main role
2003–2022	Pasión de gavilanes	Juan Reyes Guerrero	Main role
2005–06	El cuerpo del deseo	Salvador Cerinza / Pedro José Donoso	Main role
2008	La traición	Hugo de Medina / Alcides de Medina	Main role
2009–10	Mar de amor	Víctor Manuel Galíndez	Main role
2011	Los herederos del Monte	Juan del Monte	Main role
2016–17	Vuelve temprano	Inspector Antonio Avelica / "Lobo"	

== Filmography ==
- The Cuban Connection (1997) – Pablo
- Managua (1997) – Chico
- Rockaway (2007) – Juju
- Puras Joyitas (2007) – SN
- Mediterranean Blue (2012) – Andres
- The Black Russian (2012) – Dominic

== Discography ==
- Tu deseo (2008)

== See also ==
- List of Cubans
