= Infiltrados =

- Genre: Police procedural / Drama
- Written by: Juan Andrés Granados; Paola Cázares
- Directed by: William González; Andi Baiz; Jacobo Rispa; Pablo González
- Starring: Marcela Mar; Julián Arango; Ramiro Meneses; Adelaida Buscató; Juan Fernando Sánchez; Nikolás Rincón; Rashed Estefenn
- Theme music composer: Camilo Montilla
- Country of origin: Colombia
- Original language: Spanish
- No. of episodes: 40

Production
- Producer: Cristina Palacio Pombo
- Production location: Colombia
- Cinematography: Juan José Saravia, Juan Carlos Morelo, Óscar Lobo, Fernando Traslaviña
- Editor: Carlos Alejandro Ortega
- Camera setup: Multicamera
- Running time: 45 minutes
- Production company: BE-TV

Original release
- Network: Caracol TV
- Release: August 31 – October 24, 2011

Infiltrados is a 2011 Colombian police procedural drama produced by BE-TV and broadcast by Caracol TV.

== Plot ==
On his birthday, Colonel Espinosa (Luis Fernando Montoya), head of the (fictional) Joint Intelligence Group (Grupo de Inteligencia Conjunta, GIC) at the National Police of Colombia, is murdered by a gang stealing a supermarket. He is replaced by Major Mónica Umaña (Marcela Mar), who is soon to be promoted to lieutenant colonel. In the first episode, Umaña, with the team left by Espinosa, and Major Ramón García (Julián Arango), brought to the team by request of General José Fernández (Saín Castro) (and with whom she had an affair years before), must solve Espinosa's murder.

== Cast ==
- Marcela Mar as Major Mónica Umaña, head of the GIC
- Julián Arango as Major Ramón García, profiling and criminal psychology expert
- Ramiro Meneses as Captain Antonio Salgado, computing specialist
- Adelaida Buscató as Lieutenant Paulina Angarita, expert in gangs
- Juan Fernando Sánchez as Intendant Santiago Murillo, expert in acting and make-up
- Nikolás Rincón as Martín Villa, forensics doctor
- Rashed Estefenn as Attorney Eulises Martínez, designated prosecutor to the GIC
- Juan Carlos Messier as Major Germán Otero, Mónica's husband, suspended while being investigated for arms trade
- Saín Castro as General José Fernández
- Tania Falquez as Emilia, Ramón's wife (ep. 1)
- María Margarita Giraldo as Martín's mother (ep. 4)

=== Guest stars ===
- Talú Quintero (ep. 4)
- Alberto Valdiri (ep. 4)
- Flor Vargas (ep. 4)
- Jaime Barbini (ep. 4)
- Héctor de Malba (ep. 5)
- Grace Denoncourt (ep. 5)
- Sebastián Eslava (ep. 5)
- Ethy Grossman (ep. 5)
- José Luis Paniagua (ep. 6)
- Margarita Muñoz (ep. 6)
- Ricardo Vélez (ep. 7)
- Patricia Polanco (ep. 7)
- Martha Silva (ep. 7)
- Edgard Rojas (ep. 7)
- Valentina Rendón (ep. 8)
- Jorge López (ep. 8)
- Fernando Peñuela (ep. 8)
- Álvaro García (ep. 8)
- Tatiana Rentería (ep. 10)
- Fabio Rubiano (ep. 11)
- Marcela Posada (ep. 12)
- Vicky Rueda (ep. 12)
- Manuela González (ep. 13)
- Beatriz Helena Álvarez (ep. 13)
- Luis Fernando Salas (ep. 14)
- Mariluz Mariluz (ep. 14)
- Carlos Camacho (ep. 14)
- Hernando Forero (ep. 14)
- Marcelo Cezán (ep. 14)
- Luis Visbet (ep. 14)
- Cristian de Dios (ep. 15)
- Felipe Vallejo (ep. 15)
- Guillermo Gálvez (ep. 17)
- Fernando Arango (ep. 17)
- Walter Luengas (ep. 17)
- Norma Nivia (ep. 17)
- Luis Miguel Hurtado (ep. 18)
- Miguel Olarte (ep. 18)
- Juan Ángel (ep. 18)
- Waldo Urrego (ep. 19)
- Sandra Perdomo (ep. 19)
- Jorge Monterrosa (ep. 19)
- Daniel Medina (ep. 20)
- Germán Quintero (ep. 20)
- Lucho Velasco (ep. 21)
- Javier Sáenz (ep. 21)
- Lorena Álvarez (ep. 22)
- Ana María Abello

== Episodes ==
1. El asesinato de un Coronel desata una búsqueda implacable (2011-08-31)
2. Con pocas evidencias estos hombres llegan a la verdad (2011-09-01)
3. Una trágica emboscada abre las puertas a una nueva investigación (2011-09-02)
4. Las extrañas condiciones de una muerte prenden las alarmas (2011-09-05)
5. Los criminales tienen sus leyes y el GIC tiene sus métodos (2011-09-06)
6. Una difícil misión pone a prueba la valentía de estos hombres (2011-09-07)
7. No hay crimen que le quede grande a estos policías (2011-09-08)
8. El mayor Ramón García no descansará hasta encontrar a los Guzmán (2011-09-09)
9. Los agentes del GIC se enfrentan a un fuerte caso (2011-09-13)
10. Extraños casos de envenenamiento estremecen a una comunidad (2011-09-14)
11. El GIC se enfrenta a un aterrador homicidio (2011-09-15)
12. Un misterioso asesinato pone a prueba a un grupo de profesionales (2011-09-16)
13. La vida del fiscal Martínez está en peligro (2011-09-19)
14. El GIC demuestra que no hay crimen perfecto (2011-09-20)
15. Un miembro del equipo lo arriesga todo por cumplir con su deber (2011-09-21)
16. Un caso de secuestro extorsivo (2011-09-22)
17. Ningún asesinato queda impune gracias al trabajo del GIC (2011-09-23)
18. La coronel Umaña está en peligro (2011-09-26)
19. Murillo arriesga su vida para resolver un extraño caso (2011-09-27)
20. Otra difícil tarea para la directora del GIC (2011-09-28)
21. Ningún delincuente escapa a este grupo de profesionales (2011-09-29)
22. La líder del GIC paga caro por sus errores (2011-09-30)

== Background ==
Initially, Infiltrados was about a presidential candidate who favours drug legalisation during his campaign, and is murdered. His vice presidential formula is elected, which prompts a reaction from the United States government. Juan Pablo Posada was to take the lead role. For unknown reasons, BE-TV changed the plot and turned it into a police drama with stand-alone episodes. Producer Cristina Palacio explained in an interview that the series came from the "need" for the Colombian citizenry to "respect the institutions." (BE-TV had produced "narco novelas" El cartel 2: la guerra total and Las muñecas de la mafia). The National Police of Colombia co-operates with the production of the series; its director general Oscar Naranjo attended the premiere party.
