= Gata salvaje =

Venezuelan Telenovela

- Genre: Telenovela
- Created by: Alberto Gómez
- Written by: Alberto Gómez
- Screenplay by: Omaira Rivero
- Creative director: Raúl de la Nuez
- Starring: Marlene Favela; Mario Cimarro
- Opening theme: "Gata Salvaje" performed by Pablo Montero
- Countries of origin: Venezuela; United States
- Original language: Spanish
- No. of episodes: 252

Production
- Executive producer: Alfredo Schwarz
- Producer: Gemma Lombardi
- Production locations: Miami, Florida, United States
- Cinematography: Eduardo Dávila; Reinaldo Figueira
- Editors: Alfonso González; Lissot Sánches
- Running time: 45 min
- Production companies: FonoVideo Productions; Venevisión

Original release
- Network: Venevisión
- Release: May 16, 2002 – May 2, 2003

Gata salvaje (English: Wild Cat) is a telenovela which aired first on Venevisión in Venezuela on May 16, 2002. It was released some days later on the Spanish language US TV network Univision from mid-summer 2002 until May 2003. Later, it aired in Mexico on Canal de las Estrellas from January 2003 to December 2003.

This is one of two telenovelas starring Marlene Favela and Mario Cimarro as the main protagonists, the other being Los Herederos Del Monte from Telemundo.

Venezuelan actresses Carolina Tejera and Marjorie de Sousa, Mexican actor Ariel López Padilla, Colombian actress Aura Cristina Geithner, and Puerto Rican actress Mara Croatto also make up part of the cast.

== Plot ==
Rosaura Rios is a beautiful, kind young woman who lost her mother. She lives with her drunkard father Anselmo, her sisters Mayrita and Karina, her stepmother Maria Julia, and her brother Ivan. She has no choice but to work during day as a lunch girl picking up food from the workers in the Arismendi's land; and at night, as a bartender in a nightclub in order to be able to sustain her family who lives in a small house next to the fabulous ranch of the wealthy Arismendi family. They lost their house due to the hurricane in Tampa.

Luis Mario Arismendi is a handsome, educated young man who is the heir to his family fortune. He loses his wife, Camelia, in an accident at sea, and she is never recovered. This event keeps him in a sentimental limbo for quite some time. But before that, both of them were together enjoying their honeymoon while Patricio, Camelia's former lover, called to threaten her that if she refuses to leave Luis Mario, he would tell Luis Mario that he and Camelia are lovers; and he is the only one who gives Camelia the kind of life that she desires and wants. But Camelia decided to leave Luis Mario forever to escape with him.

Luis Mario decides to return from New York to take over the family business – the ranch – which is not in good financial standing. As he returns, the small plane in which he travels suffers an accident very close by to the ranch. Rosaura, who is in the area, reaches him and rescues him. Luis Mario instinctively kisses Rosaura and Rosaura is smitten.

Eduarda, Luis Mario's sister, is determined to see Luis Mario married to Eva Granados, a beautiful but impulsive and demanding rich girl that will guarantee that they will not be financially ruined; but Luis Mario, in order to go against his sister, marries Rosaura, who is deeply in love with him although he doesn't share the same feelings.

When they get married, Eva kisses him on the mouth. Rosaura reacts by scratching him on the face, thus getting nicknamed "Wild Cat". Eduarda and Eva plan to make Rosaura and Luis Mario's lives miserable. They form a plan and murder Rosaura's father by running him over. After trapping Rosaura in their games and turning Luis Mario against her, they finally manage to break their marriage, which is also due to Rosaura's jealousy as women, Valeria, one of Eva closest friends, flaunts herself and publicly kisses Luis Mario. He also thinks her too wild to tame and too childlike, which finally causes him to divorce her. Sometime later, Luis Mario decides to leave for New York, hoping to make money to save his family ranch. He departs from his family in the airport, knowing that Rosaura is not far way, hiding behind a wall. When he boards the plane, he leaves not knowing that Rosaura is pregnant with his child. Later during Rosaura's revenge, she tells him this and he's saddened that she hadn't told him. She replied by saying "Now it doesn't matter (anymore)." It's not until later during the show that Rosaura revealed to Luis Mario that Eva was responsible murdering their unborn child by shooting her while she was riding on a horse.

Now Rosaura alone, penniless and sad begins a new life. But her luck is about to change when she finds out that she is the only descendant of Dona Cruz Olivares, a powerful and wealthy old lady who wants to find her granddaughter before she passes away. Her stepmother and half-sister try to rob her of this but Claudia, Dona Cruz's only daughter, who employs Rosaura and her brother Ivan, becomes suspicious. When Claudia meets Rosaura, she immediately likes her. One night, Claudia is searching through Rosaura's belongings and finds a hidden note, confirming that it is Rosaura the daughter of her deceased sister and deceased father Anselmo. Claudia decides to reveal the truth to Rosaura and unmask her stepmother and half sister. Rosaura becomes a sophisticated lady that will use her fortune to ruin all of those who harmed her in the past, and surely enough she does, including Luis Mario.

Her revenge begins on a night when Rosaura and Claudia attend a gallery show and sees Luis Mario, his believed-to-be dead wife, Camelia, Eva, and Eduarda. When Rosaura and Luis Mario make eye contact, Luis Mario walks up to her. He is impressed by her transformation. Rosaura tells Luis Mario: "I'm going to destroy your family Luis Mario. I'm going to destroy you." Luis Mario leaves in doubt but later he reveals to his best friend Gabriel, that he had taken her seriously and he was unsure of what to expect.

Luis Mario tries to reconquer her love but he gives up and lets Rosaura know that she is a different person. He asks her where is the feisty, innocent woman he fell in love with. She replied by saying that it was he who made her this way. Luis Mario ignores this and repeats she is a changed woman that wears too much makeup, overdresses instead of the woman who wore hair-ties and dressed like an ordinary everyday girl. Rosaura, the "Wild Cat", realizes that her transformation has turned her into a bitter and heartless woman, and she comes to understand that the love she feels for Luis Mario is unbreakable, and that aside from all the things she did to the Arismendi family, she passionately loves him. Finally, after another long period of going through troubles and fighting their enemies, they will both be able to regain the happiness that long time ago escaped them.

In the mid-spring to early summer of 2011, Telefutura gained the rights to the soap opera. It was aired Monday-Friday at 10:00am.

== Cast ==
Actor	Character	Description
Marlene Favela	Rosaura Ríos	Main character, daughter of Anselmo, half-sister of Iván and Mayrita, stepsister of Karina, stepdaughter of María Julia, granddaughter of Doña Cruz, niece of Claudia, ex-wife of Patricio, mother of Gabrielita, in love with Luis Mario, Luis Mario's wife
Mario Cimarro	Luis Mario Arismendí	Lead male character, adoptive brother of Eduarda and Jimena, adoptive cousin of Luisana, ex-husband of Camelia and Eva, son of Mercedes, half brother of Patricio, father of Gabrielita, cousin of Adriana, in love with Rosaura and marries her twice
Carolina Tejera	Eva Granados	Main female villain, daughter of Rafael, sister of Silvia, half-sister of Karina, cousin of Maximiliano, mother of Luisito (the father is Gabriel), ex-accomplice of Eduarda, Luis Mario's ex-wife and in love with him (dies from the Everglades killed by the crocodiles)
Marjorie de Sousa	Camelia Valente	Main female villain, first wife of Luis Mario, Patricio's ex-lover and wife. The only villain to escape mostly unpunished.
Mara Croatto	Eduarda Arismendí	Main female villain, Luis Mario is her adoptive brother, sister of Jimena, cousin of Luisana, Patricio's ex-wife (dies from her injuries after getting run over by a car)
Ariel López Padilla	Patricio Rivera	Main male villain, later turns good, son of Mercedes, half brother of Luis Mario, ex-lover and husband of Camelia, ex-husband of Eduarda and Rosaura with whom he is in love, cousin of Adriana (ends up in hospital with severe injuries after trying to commit suicide and eventually dies after repenting)
Adamari López	Karina Granados	Villain, later turns good, daughter of María Julia and Rafael, stepdaughter of Anselmo, stepsister of Rosaura, half-sister of Iván and Mayrita, half-sister of Eva and Silvia, in love with Rodrigo, then with Maximiliano, ends up with Rodrigo
Aura Cristina Geithner	Maribella Tovar	Villain, later turns good, sister of Jacqueline, ex-wife of Silvano, in love with Luis Mario (killed by Eva by throwing her to the stairs because she told Rosaura that Eva and Eduarda killed Rosaura's dad.)
Osvaldo Ríos	Silvano Santana Castro	Ex-husband of Maribella, in love with Rosaura, in the end realizes that he had been in love with Jacqueline all along
Ana Karina Casanova	Luisana Montero	Cousin of Eduarda and Jimena, Luis Mario is her adoptive cousin, has a relationship with Bruno and a fling with Silvano, ends up with Guillermo
Silvana Arias	Jimena Arismendí	Luis Mario is her adoptive brother, sister of Eduarda, cousin of Luisana, in love with Iván, has a fling with Guillermo
Frances Ondiviela	María Julia	Villain, later turns good, mother of Karina, Iván and Mayrita, stepmother of Rosaura, wife of Anselmo, in love with Rafael
Sergio Catalán	Gabriel Valencia	Best friend of Luis Mario, father of Luisito (the mother is Eva), in love with Eva, then with Minerva
Ismael La Rosa	Iván Ríos	Villain, later turns good, son of Anselmo and María Julia, half-brother of Rosaura and Karina, brother Of Mayrita, in love with Jimena
Juan A. Baptista	Bruno Villalta	Nephew of Caridad, in love with Rosaura, then with Luisana, ends up with Estrella Marina
Virna Flores	Minerva Palacios	Villain, later turns good, Cousin of Julio, Patricio's former lover, in love with Gabriel, then with Maximiliano, whom she marries, remarries to Gabriel, stepmother Of Luisito
Marisela Buitrago	Claudia Olivares	Daughter of Doña Cruz, aunt of Rosaura, in love with Rafael to whom she marries
Jéssica Cerezo	Silvia Granados	Villain, later turns good, daughter of Rafael, sister of Eva, half-sister of Karina, cousin of Maximiliano, ex-wife of Fernando, in love with Kike whom she marries in the end
Liliana Rodríguez	Panchita López	Villain, comic relief character, later turns good, servant at the Arismendi mansion, ex-accomplice of Camelia, Eva and Eduarda, in love with Larry
Norma Zuñiga	Caridad Montes	Aunt of Bruno, servant at the Arismendi mansion
Charlie Massó	Rodrigo	Singer, former stripper, friend of Ivan, in love with Karina
Rodrigo Vidal	Guillermo Valencia	Brother of Gabriel, in love with Luisana, has a brief fling with Jimena
Yoly Domínguez	Valeria Montemar	Villain, later turns good, friend of Eva and Silvia, sister of Laurita, in love with Rodrigo
Hada Béjar	Doña Cruz Olivares	Grandmother of Rosaura, mother of Claudia
César Román	Imanol Lander	Friend of Iván, in love with Adriana
Sandro Finoglio	Maximiliano Robles	Nephew of Rafael, cousin of Eva and Silvia, in love with Rosaura, then with Minerva whom he marries (drowned)
Fernando Carrera	Rafael Granados	Father of Eva, Silvia and Karina, uncle of Maximiliano, in love with Rosaura, then with Claudia whom he marries (accidentally poisoned and killed by Eduarda)
Sandra Itzel	Mayrita Ríos	Daughter of Anselmo and María Julia, sister of Iván, half-sister of Rosaura and Karina, friend of Leobardo
Viviana Gibelli	Jaqueline Tovar	Sister of Maribella, in love with Silvano
Isabel Moreno	Mercedes Salazar	Mother of Luis Mario and Patricio, aunt of Adriana, teacher of Mayrita and Leobardo
Ana Lucía Domínguez	Adriana Linares	Cousin of Luis Mario and Patricio, niece of Mercedes, in love with Iván
Julio Capote	Samuel Tejar	Butler at the Olivares mansion
Luisa Castro	Griselda Ortíz	Villain, servant at the Olivares mansion, accomplice of Camelia and Patricio (died of a heart attack)
Carlos Mesber	Carlos	Villain, worker at the Arismendi mansion, ex-accomplice of Eva, Eduarda and Camelia (goes to jail)
Julio Alcázar	Anselmo Ríos	Alcoholic father of Rosaura, Iván and Mayrita, stepfather of Karina, María Julia's husband (killed by Eduarda and Eva by running him over)
Christina Dieckmann	Estrella Marina Gutiérrez	Daughter of Patricio, Luis Mario's niece, granddaughter of Mercedes, in love with Bruno
Diana Quijano	Sonia	Villain, later turns good, mother of Leobardo, helps to give birth the baby of Rosaura and steal it
Konstantinos Vrotsos	Leobardo	Son of Sonia, grandson of Fidelia, Friend of Mayrita
Mauro Boccia	Kike	In love with Silvia
Fernando Lozano	Larry Bueno	In love with Panchita
Carlos Cuervo	Professor Fernando Islas	Ex-husband and teacher of Silvia, in love with Luisana
Angie Russian	Laurita Montemar	Sister of Valeria, a classmate of Rodrigo, Sylvia and Jimena
Pilar Hurtado	Martha Acuña	Maid at the Granados house
Dayana Garroz	Wendy Torres	A classmate of Rodrigo, Sylvia and Jimena
José Val	Abel Tapía	A classmate of Rodrigo, Sylvia and Jimena
Nélida Ponce	Fidelia	Sonia's mother, Leobardo's grandmother
Renato Lamborchini	Segundo Extra	?
Ricardo Garcia	Dr. Montoro	Villainous doctor who put Camelia in the insane asylum
Ximena Duque	Student	student in Jimena's class
