= Lala's Spa =

Colombian telenovela

- Genre: Telenovela
- Written by: Juan Manuel Cáceres; Héctor Moncada
- Theme music composer: Ignacio Canut Guillén and Carlos García Berlanga
- Opening theme: "A quién le importa" by La Ramona
- Country of origin: Colombia
- Original language: Spanish
- No. of seasons: 1
- No. of episodes: 80

Production
- Production location: Bogotá, Colombia
- Production company: RCN Televisión

Original release
- Network: Canal RCN
- Release: 6 April – 2 August 2021

Lala's Spa is a Colombian telenovela that premiered on Canal RCN on 6 April 2021, and ended on 2 August 2021. It is the first telenovela starring a transgender actress. The plot revolves around Lala Jiménez, a young and beautiful woman who has returned from Paris to Colombia to help her mother with her debts, but on her return falls in love with Francisco, a businessman who by circumstances of life is involved in a legal problems.

According to Kantar Ibope Media, the telenovela averaged a total of 6.79 rating points during its premiere.

== Cast ==
=== Main ===
- Isabella Santiago as Lala Jiménez
- Ricardo Mejía as Francisco Ponce de León
- Luly Bossa as Doña Nelcy
- Mauricio Vélez as Javier Villegas «El Zar del Lulo»
- Cony Camelo as Cristina Castillo
- Carlos Hurtado as Felipe Gallego
- Zulma Rey as Ingrid Tatiana Chávez
- Diana Belmonte as Mayerly «Mayo» Escocia
- Ernesto Ballén as Kevin Pinto
- Víctor David Tarazona as Juan Camilo Platz
- Álvaro Córdova as Plinio McArthur
- Michelle Rouillard as Carla Mendoza
- Paola Moreno as Raquel "Raquelita" Jaramillo
- Fernando Arévalo as Don Salomón
- Aco Pérez as Juan Carlos Troncoso «Juancho»

=== Recurring ===
- Danielle Arciniegas as Genoveva Rubio
- Kristina Lilley as Lucía Ponce de León
- Coraima Torres as María Claudia
- Tatiana Ariza as Valentina Rincón
- Alejandro Gutiérrez as Fiscal Alberto Rodríguez Malo
- Jairo Soto as Don Olegario
- Pacho Rueda as Tribú
- Carlos Carvajal as Martín Ponce de León
- Pedro Suárez as Moncada
- Diego León Ospina as Ceferino
- Javier Gnecco Jr as Fernando Rubio
- Ángel de Miguel as Manolo Borbón
- Daniel Rocha as Barry Lafuente
- Paula Barreto as Brenda Hoyos Llano

== Episodes ==
No.	Title	Original release date	Colombia viewers (Rating points)
1	"Lala sorprende con su regreso a Colombia"	6 April 2021	6.8
2	"Lala se entera de la verdad sobre Francisco"	7 April 2021	6.9
3	"Lala habla con Francisco sobre sus intenciones"	8 April 2021	6.5
4	"Mayo llega al barrio de Lala y Kevin la recibe"	9 April 2021	6.0
5	"Francisco se entera de la verdad sobre Lala"	12 April 2021	6.3
6	"Francisco se da cuenta de que JuanC le tendió una trampa"	13 April 2021	5.7
7	"Kevin se ve envuelto en problemas"	14 April 2021	6.1
8	"Francisco logra escapar de la polícia"	15 April 2021	6.1
9	"Ingrid y Francisco le piden ayuda a Lala"	16 April 2021	6.6
10	"Lala se entera de que Francisco se besó con Carla"	19 April 2021	6.2
11	"Lala confronta a Francisco y le hace un fuerte reclamo"	20 April 2021	5.8
12	"Francisco le hace una interesante propuesta a Lala"	21 April 2021	4.8
13	"A Lala le vuelve el alma al cuerpo"	22 April 2021	5.7
14	"Francisco sufre un accidente"	23 April 2021	6.2
15	"JuanC le da información a la Fiscalía sobre el paradero Francisco"	26 April 2021	5.8
16	"La Fiscalía llega al spa de Lala"	27 April 2021	5.2
17	"Lala le reclama a Francisco por tener varias mujeres"	28 April 2021	5.5
18	"Francisco le da una dolorosa noticia a Lala"	29 April 2021	5.4
19	"Francisco le rompe el corazón a Lala"	30 April 2021	6.2
20	"Lala es acusada de un supuesto robo"	3 May 2021	5.9
21	"Francisco se da cuenta de que JuanC lo está traicionando"	4 May 2021	5.6
22	"Francisco comienza a trabajar en el spa de Lala"	5 May 2021	5.9
23	"Genoveva se entera de la situación por la que está pasando Francisco"	6 May 2021	6.2
24	"Raquelita descubre la verdad sobre Francisco"	7 May 2021	5.9
25	"Lala está a punto de renunciar al spa"	10 May 2021	5.8
26	"Lala atraviesa por un mal momento"	11 May 2021	6.0
27	"Lala vive una gran desilusión"	12 May 2021	6.1
28	"La vida de Lala da un giro inesperado"	13 May 2021	5.9
29	"El romántico acercamiento entre Lala y Francisco"	14 May 2021	6.4
30	"Lala y Francisco salen a bailar"	18 May 2021	5.9
31	"Francisco y Lala escapan de la Policía"	19 May 2021	5.5
32	"Francisco se reencuentra con Genoveva"	20 May 2021	5.6
33	"Francisco se rehúsa a sentir cosas por Lala"	21 May 2021	6.3
34	"Francisco se reúne con Fernando"	24 May 2021	6.1
35	"JuanC trata de convencer a Ingrid para que invierta en la bolsa"	25 May 2021	5.6
36	"Lala, Francisco e Ingrid organizan un plan en contra de Rubio"	26 May 2021	6.7
37	"Lala vive un incómodo momento"	27 May 2021	6.6
38	"Lala se reúne con JuanC"	28 May 2021	6.2
39	"JuanC queda flechado con Lala y le hace una invitación especial"	31 May 2021	6.3
40	"Lala y Francisco se unen para hacerle una jugada a JuanC"	1 June 2021	6.5
41	"La libertad de Francisco corre peligro"	2 June 2021	6.2
42	"Lala vuelve a meter las manos al fuego por Francisco"	3 June 2021	4.9
43	"Francisco recibe amenazas"	4 June 2021	5.1
44	"Lala vive un amargo momento"	8 June 2021	5.9
45	"Lala y Francisco se enteran del plan de Salomón y JuanC"	9 June 2021	5.4
46	"Lala a punto de descubrir la verdad sobre Francisco"	10 June 2021	6.8
47	"Lala enfrenta a Francisco y le hace fuertes confesiones"	11 June 2021	6.2
48	"Gallego captura a Francisco"	15 June 2021	6.1
49	"Un viejo amor vuelve a la vida de Lala"	16 June 2021	5.2
50	"La indiferencia de Lala afecta a Francisco"	17 June 2021	6.0
51	"Francisco se lleva una desilusión al ver a Lala con otro hombre"	18 June 2021	5.8
52	"La emotiva despedida de Mayo y Kevin"	21 June 2021	6.5
53	"Lala celebra un nuevo logro en su vida"	22 June 2021	6.4
54	"Francisco sorprende a Lala con su visita inesperada"	23 June 2021	7.0
55	"Nelcy se entera de la verdadera identidad de Francisco"	24 June 2021	5.7
56	"Francisco le da la cara a Nelcy"	25 June 2021	5.4
57	"Lala recibe una inesperada visita"	28 June 2021	6.0
58	"Francisco comienza una nueva vida junto a Kevin y Mayo"	29 June 2021	5.6
59	"Villegas encuentra a Francisco"	30 June 2021	5.6
60	"Francisco se desahoga con Lala"	1 July 2021	5.8
61	"Francisco le hace una dura confesión a Ingrid"	2 July 2021	5.9
62	"Se evidencia un romántico acercamiento entre Nelcy y Villegas"	6 July 2021	6.3
63	"Villegas besa a Nelcy"	7 July 2021	6.1
64	"Ingrid se sale con la suya y beneficiará a Francisco"	8 July 2021	6.0
65	"Ingrid cambia sus cartas y se convierte en la rival de Francisco"	9 July 2021	5.9
66	"Villegas rapta a Francisco"	12 July 2021	6.7
67	"Lala encuentra a Francisco en un estado preocupante"	13 July 2021	6.3
68	"Gallego le devuelve las esperanzas a Francisco"	14 July 2021	5.7
69	"Kevin le pide matrimonio a Mayo"	15 July 2021	5.8
70	"Ingrid chantajea a JuanC y logra su cometido"	16 July 2021	5.9
71	"Lala sufre un accidente de tránsito"	19 July 2021	6.0
72	"A la vida de Lala vuelve una persona importante"	21 July 2021	6.1
73	"Mayo y Kevin dan el sí en el altar"	22 July 2021	7.1
74	"Capturan a Francisco"	23 July 2021	7.4
75	"Francisco es trasladado a la cárcel"	26 July 2021	6.1
76	"Francisco le declara sus sentimientos a Lala"	27 July 2021	6.5
77	"Lala se entera de que Manolo denunció a Francisco"	28 July 2021	6.4
78	"El juicio de Francisco"	29 July 2021	6.5
79	"Juan C testifica a favor de Francisco"	30 July 2021	6.8
80	"Francisco y Lala le dan una oportunidad al amor"	2 August 2021	7.9

=== Los BFF (2021) ===
On 8 April 2021, RCN Televisión announced the premiere of a web series in parallel to Lala's Spa entitled Los BFF. The series premiered on 15 April 2021 through Canal RCN, and the channel's official YouTube account. The plot revolves around the adventures and anecdotes of Francisco (Ricardo Mejía) and Juan C. Platz (Víctor David Tarazona).

No.	Title	Original release date
1	"El ascensor"	15 April 2021
2	"Situaciones random para gomelos"	22 April 2021
3	"El gym – Part 1"	29 April 2021
4	"Test para mejores amigos"	6 May 2021
5	"Jueves de TBT"	13 May 2021
6	"Diccionario ñero"	20 May 2021
7	"El gym – Part 2"	27 May 2021
8	"¿Quién es el más?"	3 June 2021
9	"En el party"	10 June 2021
10	"Había una vez"	17 June 2021
11	"Llamada de domingo"	24 June 2021
12	"La entrevista"	1 July 2021
