= El Barón =

- Genre: Drama
- Created by: Jörg Hiller
- Written by: Jörg Hiller; Johanna Gutiérrez; Carolina Barrera; Patricia Hernández
- Directed by: Danny Gavidia; Rodrigo Triana
- Starring: Francisco Angelini; María Elisa Camargo
- Theme music composer: Orlando Pérez Rosso & Daniel Jiménez Afandador
- Opening theme: "Fragile We Are" by Ben Foerg
- Country of origin: United States
- Original language: Spanish
- No. of seasons: 1
- No. of episodes: 59

Production
- Executive producers: Ximena Cantuarias; Silvia Duran; Marcos Santana
- Camera setup: Multi-camera
- Production companies: Sony Pictures Television; Telemundo Global Studios

Original release
- Network: Telemundo
- Release: 30 January – 25 April 2019

El Barón is an American telenovela produced by Sony Pictures Television and Telemundo Global Studios for Telemundo that premiered on 30 January 2019 and ended on 25 April 2019. It stars Francisco Angelini as the titular character. El Barón tells the story of Ignacio Montero, a young Mexican rebel, dreamer and visionary who changed the world of drug trafficking.

== Cast ==
- Francisco Angelini as Ignacio "Nacho" Montero / El Barón
- María Elisa Camargo as Isabel García
- Jorge Luis Moreno as Joe Fernández
- Variel Sánchez as Ramiro Villa "El Paisa
- Mauricio Mejía as Pablo Escobar
- Gabriel Tarantini as Justin Thompson
- Tania Valencia as Judy Caicedo
- Lorena Garcia
- Julián Diaz as Mister Drake
- Kornel Doman as David Liebermann
- Andrés Echevarría as Paul Thompson
- Juana Arboleda as Griselda Blanco "La Madrina
- Natasha Klauss as Carla
- Carlos Camacho as Angel Zamora
- Kristina Lilley as Ana Farley
- Michelle Rouillard as Marcela
- Julio Bracho as Géronimo Montero
- Carolina Gómez as María Clara
- Pedro Suárez as Alberto
- Juan Pablo Llano as Mauricio Jaramillo
- Juan Calero
- David Ojalvo as Logan
- Tim Janssen as Kyle Brown
- James Lawrence as Lewis

== Reception ==
The series premiered with a total of 1.03 million viewers. The first twenty episodes aired weekdays at 10pm/9c. Due to low ratings, on 4 March 2019 the series moved to the 1am/12c timeslot and episodes are uploaded on the Telemundo app and Telemundo On Demand.

== Episodes ==
No.	Title	Original release date	US viewers (millions)
1	"Nacho se inicia como narco"	30 January 2019	1.03
A rebellious and daring young man, Ignacio Montero smuggles cigarettes and soon discovers that he can dedicate himself to the sale and distribution of marijuana. He meets Pablo Escobar in Medellín.
2	"Nacho conoce a sus aliados"	31 January 2019	0.96
A pilot who transports the drug, a good contact in Canada and a provider as solid as Pablo Escobar, make up a perfect triangle for Nacho's business to start successfully.
3	"Isabel se va con Nacho"	1 February 2019	0.94
Fed up with Kyle's abuse, Isabel runs into Nacho's arms and they both leave Canada to go to New York. They do not measure the consequences of a war, which goes beyond infidelity.
4	"Nacho en el blanco con Kyle"	6 February 2019	0.81
Kyle looks for Nacho to kill him, but when the DEA intervenes in a Manhattan disco, fate plays against him. He is willing to talk, but in exchange for some benefit.
5	"El ascenso"	7 February 2019	0.87
The drug must be transported by air and learning to pilot small planes, is a priority for Nacho. Meanwhile, Isabel is pleased with so much money, that she can buy the house that she likes the most.
6	"La pelea por la cocaina"	8 February 2019	0.88
Griselda Blanco, aka La Madrina, leader of the Medellin cartel and a pioneer of organized crime in Miami, wants Nacho to work for her. But he has other plans.
7	"La astucia"	11 February 2019	0.81
While Isabel uses her skills to distract La Madrina, Nacho relies on the work of his infiltrators, without noticing that an unforeseen event will lead to an all-out war.
8	"Socios desleales"	13 February 2019	0.75
With such a profitable business, Nacho and Isabel acquire luxury properties. La Madrina suspects that they are playing dirty, not dividing everything they earn. Marc is kidnaped.
9	"La visita relámpago"	14 February 2019	0.82
The surprise arrival of La Madrina activates the alarms; but Isabel, pressed by the circumstances, diverts her attention so that Nacho can gain time.
10	"La infidelidad a flor de piel"	15 February 2019	0.85
Marcela leaves a message to Nacho. The message is heard by Isabel and arouses her curiosity to meet her. She confronts Nacho and asks uncomfortable questions.
11	"La quieren muerta"	18 February 2019	0.83
Mejía's son wants revenge and Escobar asks Nacho to help him kill La Madrina. Griselda sees Sonny as the heir of her emporium.
12	"La rival"	19 February 2019	0.87
Marcela, disgusted with Nacho, has a threesome; while Isabel thinks she has everything under control. Under the pressure of Escobar, Nacho undertakes a dangerous mission, to remove Mejía from the hospital.
13	"La trampa"	20 February 2019	0.83
It's Sonny's birthday. La Madrina invites Isabel to the celebration, she does not know what plan they have prepared for her.
14	"La tortura"	21 February 2019	0.75
After Sonny's kidnapping, La Madrina orders to punish to Judy so that she confesses where they took him. Nacho arrives in Medellin and Escobar demands that he see him.
15	"El sueño cumplido de Isabel"	22 February 2019	0.82
The largest and most exquisite nightclub in Miami opens its doors and happiness is so great that Isabel and Nacho sleep together to celebrate. La Madrina and Jorge Ochoa are special guests.
16	"Dueños de la noche"	25 February 2019	0.80
Nacho and Isabel flash style and glamor, but cocaine is the magnet in La Juerga to attract powerful drug traffickers, corrupt police officers, those who are not and even infiltrated the federal police.
17	"La jugada maestra"	26 February 2019	0.91
The corrupt police want to show their loyalty to Nacho to enter the drug business, so they follow his order to attack La Madrina. The scandal between Nacho and Isabel is unleashed.
18	"El ataque de celos"	27 February 2019	0.85
Isabel, alone and depressed, invites her ex, Kyle to La Juerga. When Nacho sees them dancing together he goes crazy and pulls out a gun. A snitch tells La Madrina where her son is.
19	"La Madrina marca su territorio"	28 February 2019	0.96
Sonny witnesses a fierce attack. The hunch of El Paisa turns out to be right when he discovers that Judy is locked up.
20	"Nacho es El Barón"	1 March 2019	N/A
La Madrina declares war on Nacho, but she can not imagine who he went to, to get her out of the way. Escobar baptizes him as El Barón and Carlos Lehder as El Príncipe del Caribe.
21	"Camino a la perdición"	4 March 2019	N/A
Alcohol and drugs make Nacho drift away who he most wants in life, his wife, Isabel. The federals arrive at Norman Key, Bahamas. La Madrina attacks La Juerga.
22	"Unidos por la tragedia"	5 March 2019	N/A
The pain of the loss of a friend causes Isabel to cry inconsolably in Nacho's arms. After the attacks of La Madrina they can not return to Miami.
23	"La fuga"	6 March 2019	N/A
Isabel's uncle provides accommodation for her, Nacho and his friends at his hotel in Cancun, but demands that they leave as soon as possible, when he sees Drake wounded by a bullet.
24	"Nacho pierde la cabeza"	7 March 2019	N/A
Determined to become a murderer, Nacho wants to avenge the death of his friend and bury his painful memories. He confronts his father at gunpoint.
25	"La venganza de Nacho"	8 March 2019	N/A
After finding out where Cabrera is, Nacho and El Paisa intercept him to kill him. Joe Fernandez, hidden, takes the federals by surprise. El Coronel denounces that he was kidnapped.
26	"Nacho es un soplón"	11 March 2019	N/A
Pablo Escobar threatens Nacho and asks for explanations about how the DEA came to Norman's Cay. Cabrera's becomes an ace for El Barón.
27	"El Barón de la cocaína"	12 March 2019	N/A
Nacho demands a percentage in exchange for raising production in the laboratory to one and a half tons of cocaine per month. Escobar displaces Alacrán and El Barón takes over the reins.
28	"Isabel paga las consecuencias"	13 March 2019	N/A
Nacho improves the laboratory to raise cocaine production, but the enemy is close and puts Isabel's life in danger. Judy joins Pacho Herrera, leader of the Cali Cartel.
29	"Más que el poder de la cocaína"	14 March 2019	N/A
The control of the institutions allows to manage the laws and with that power, Nacho and Escobar plan to promote, even more, the business of cocaine.
30	"El diablo tienta a Nacho"	15 March 2019	N/A
A high level meeting in Armenia leads Nacho to the German Inn, where Cecilia appears and he falls for her. The narcos approve the idea of entering the circle of politics.
31	"Nacho saca ventaja"	18 March 2019	N/A
To import acetone, Nacho needs a company that represents him and a recognized businessman that does not raise suspicions. And he gets it, Justin fulfills his role.
32	"El secuestro"	19 March 2019	N/A
The Alacrán demands money in exchange for the life of Colonel Gerónimo Montero. Nacho does not want to pay a penny for his father's ransom. Judy recruits women for Pacho Herrera.
33	"El plan de Nacho"	20 March 2019	N/A
Although he knows that it is not a better strategy, Nacho looks for Father Miguel to give him clues about the kidnappers. Isabel begs him to convince Nacho and pay for the ransom.
34	"El canje"	21 March 2019	N/A
Although it is a contradiction for him, Nacho agrees to pay for the rescue of his father.
35	"El premio mayor"	22 March 2019	N/A
When Thompson arrives at Escobar's lair, Nacho lies to the Capo, saves the life of the agent and in return, puts two conditions. Jaramillo is already a Nacho's partner. El Alacrán goes for Lehder.
36	"Duro golpe de la guerrilla"	25 March 2019	N/A
El Alacrán attacks the Alemana inn and Joe Fernández is in the middle of the shooting. Nacho gives the bad news of his father's death to Clara and she points him out as the person responsible for his death.
37	"Sangre con sangre se paga"	26 March 2019	N/A
Lidia Ochoa, cousin of the Ochoa brothers, is a guerrilla hostage and the wound caused by the shock worsens. Cecilia takes advantage of Isabel's absence to conquer Nacho.
38	"Surge el MAS"	27 March 2019	N/A
After the crime of Lidia, Escobar proposes to create a group outside the law, to hunt and kill the kidnappers, called MAS. Nacho and Cecilia kiss.
39	"La confesión"	28 March 2019	N/A
Isabel, full of doubts, confesses with Father Miguel. Thompson pressures to find Justin and although his son arrives safe and sound, his delivery is complicated.
40	"El bálsamo"	29 March 2019	N/A
Feeling betrayed by his wife and having a bad time with Father Miguel, Nacho seeks relief with Cecilia. Isabel ties the ends and concludes that El Barón is with her.
41	"Cambio de prioridades"	1 April 2019	N/A
The plan for the guerrilla to take the bait is underway, but Nacho must now think about how dangerous it is to remain in the jungle. He lies to Isabel again when she interrogates him.
42	"Los reyes de la acetona"	2 April 2019	N/A
Nacho closes the deal with Jaramillo to import acetone to Colombia, but the calculation of the benefits did not include the loss of human lives.
43	"Herida"	3 April 2019	N/A
Nacho places Isabel in a safe place and ends his relationship with Cecilia, but she manages to become irresistible. The summit of narcos raises the temperature between cartels.
44	"El peor enemigo"	4 April 2019	N/A
The Minister of Justice, Rodrigo Lara Bonilla, dies at the hands of two assassins, for being a threat to the cartel.
45	"Juego sucio"	5 April 2019	N/A
Cecilia is determined to stay with Nacho. Since he will not leave Isabel, she uses her tricks to provoke the breakup. Joe and Drake discover Judy spying in the cellar.
46	"Lío de faldas"	8 April 2019	N/A
Nacho admits the truth and tells Isabel that he loves her. When Isabel hears that she was a mistake, she provokes and ignites the discussion even more. Isabel makes a radical decision.
47	"Escondite bajo la sotana"	9 April 2019	N/A
Nacho and his henchmen flee through the woods. Because of Isabel's condition they decide to get help from Father Miguel. The National Police explode the laboratory.
48	"Paraíso de narcos"	10 April 2019	N/A
Nacho proposes to leave Colombia and go to Panama to hide from the Americans, but someone must take charge of the business.
49	"El precio de la traición"	11 April 2019	N/A
Santacruz negotiates with Nacho. He proposes to pay 20 million dollars in exchange for getting the Medellín Cartel out of the way. Cecilia bribes a sergeant. Escobar and his henchmen enjoy Panama.
50	"La reconquista"	12 April 2019	N/A
Joe and Isabel already have tickets to go to New York, meanwhile Nacho is given advice by Judy, to recover his wife. Cecilia makes an anonymous call to the police.
51	"La escapada a Nueva York"	15 April 2019	N/A
Isabel goes to the airport with Joe to New York, but something unexpected complicates everything in mid-flight. Drake and Judy suspect of Fernandez and share it with Nacho.
52	"Duelo de narcos"	16 April 2019	N/A
Ledher faces Nacho after leaving Panama. Montero swears loyalty to him and warns him that the Cali cartel wants him dead.
53	"Todo por amor"	17 April 2019	N/A
Nacho goes to the airport to go to New York to find Isabel, but there an agent arrests him. Ledher negotiates with Thompson, he demands immunity for him and for Montero.
54	"Emboscada"	18 April 2019	N/A
Thompson arrives at the hotel where the drug lords stay in Panama, but President Noriega and his army confront him. Albertico is hidden in a garbage barrel.
55	"El sapo"	19 April 2019	N/A
Escobar wants to know who gave them away and Thompson, arrested and isolated in a bunker, will serve as bait. Kyle takes Isabel and her son.
56	"Chivo expiatorio"	22 April 2019	N/A
Ledher points to Judy and Escobar captures her alive to confess. Nacho finds out about Lehder's move and alerts Paisa. Isabel pleads for the life of her son.
57	"Dulce venganza"	23 April 2019	N/A
La Madrina holds Isabel hostage and is her best weapon to catch Nacho and get even with him.
58	"Al borde de la muerte"	24 April 2019	N/A
La Madrina threatens Nacho and Isabel. Montero challenges Griselda Blanco. Escobar declares war on the Colombian government.
59	"Punto de quiebre"	25 April 2019	N/A
Nacho, Isabel and his people attack an ambulance and enter the hospital to recover his son. The rescue of Thompson unleashes an intense shooting.
