= La venganza de Analía =

Colombian drama television series

- Genre: Drama
- Created by: Clara María Ochoa; Ana Piñeres
- Written by: Claudia Sánchez; Said Chamie
- Directed by: Camilo Vega; Lucho Sierra
- Starring: Carolina Gómez
- Composer: Juan Gabriel Turbay
- Country of origin: Colombia
- Original language: Spanish
- No. of seasons: 2
- No. of episodes: 120

Production
- Executive producer: Ana Piñeres
- Producer: Clara María Ochoa
- Editors: Diego Narciso; Marlon Cortés; Alejandro Arias
- Production company: CMO Producciones

Original release
- Network: Caracol Televisión
- Release: 15 April 2020 – 12 September 2025

La venganza de Analía (English: Ana's Revenge) is a Colombian drama television series created by Clara María Ochoa and Ana Piñeres for Caracol Televisión. The series premiered on 15 April 2020. It stars Carolina Gómez as the title character.

On 24 August 2023, the series was renewed for a second season that premiered on 21 May 2025.

== Premise ==
Analía (Carolina Gómez) is a beautiful woman who decides to exact revenge against her mother's killer, Guillermo León Mejía (Marlon Moreno), who is a Presidential candidate. She travels abroad and prepares to become the most important political advisor in the country. When she feels ready, she returns and becomes Mejía's right hand and strategist. Her plan consists in gaining his trust, placing him first in the polls, only to then destroy him by shedding light on his past and his corruption and illegal actions. Her goal is for him to lose the presidency and even his freedom. In her road to vengeance, Analía faces many truths that will put her decision to a test. Among those, the possibility that by destroying the man she hates she might need to also destroy the only man she has ever loved, Pablo de la Torre (George Slebi).

== Cast ==
=== Main ===
- Carolina Gómez as Analía Guerrero
- Marlon Moreno as Guillermo León Mejía
- George Slebi as Pablo de la Torre
- Geraldine Zivic as Rosario Castiblanco de Mejía
- María Cecilia Botero as Eugenia Castiblanco de De la Torre
- Andrea Gómez as Dora Serna "Dorita"
- Juliana Galvis as Carolina Valencia
- Kristina Lilley as Andrea Correa / Susana Guerrero
- Edwin Maya as Juan Mario Mejía Castiblanco
- Viviana Santos as Sofía Mejía Castiblanco
- Alejandro Gutiérrez as Santiago Castiblanco
- Michelle Manterola as Isabella Aponte
- Juan Alfonso Baptista as Mark Salinas
- Carolina Cuervo as Liliana Camargo
- Matías Maldonado as Andrei Robiras "Toto"
- Mauricio Figueroa as Manuel José de la Torre
- John Ceballos as Edgar Aponte
- Diego Sarmiento as Ramiro Cuéllar
- Vladimir Bernal as Mayor Vélez
- Juan Manuel Oróstegui as Jairo "el Ingeniero"
- Ricardo Mejía as David de la Torre
- María Elvira Arango as Sacha
- Julieta Villar as Helena de la Torre Valencia
- Orlando Valenzuela as Ramiro Pérez
- Manuel Sarmiento as Salvador Suárez
- Ana Wills as Alejandra Mejía Castiblanco
- María Camila Giraldo as Lupita
- Édgar Vittorino as Estefano Ibague
- Edinson Gil as Lebrón Días
- Víctor Hugo Trespalacios as Don Rosendo
- Paola Turbay as Paulina Peña (season 2)

=== Recurring ===
- Brian Moreno as Child Guillermo León Mejía "Memo"
- Rebeca Milanés as Darelis Junca
- María Fernanda Duque as Child Ana Lucia Junca "Rana"
- Jacobo Díez as Child Pablo de la Torre
- Gerónimo Barón as Child David de la Torre
- Carlos Camacho as Young Manuel José de la Torre
- Adelaida Buscató as Young Eugenia de la Torre
- Mariana Fernández as Young Rosario Castiblanco
- Marisol Correa as Young Andrea Correa
- Juan David González as Young Santiago Castiblanco
- Ariana Ovalle as Child Dora Serna "Dorita"
- Jeshua Rico as Child Andrei Robiras "Toto"
- Alejandra Villamizar as Young Fabiola Contreras
- Diego Mateus as el Teniente Agustín Bahamón
- Javier Gnecco Jr. as Darío Cabo
- Gerardo Calero as Mariano
- Felipe Estupiñán as Laso
- Julián Mora as "Tarántula"
- Obeida Benavides as Doña Nidia
- Lillyana Guihurt as Gisela Castiblanco

== Episodes ==
Season	Episodes	Originally released	
Season	Episodes	First released	Last released
1	53	15 April 2020	3 July 2020
2	67	21 May 2025	12 September 2025

=== Season 1 (2020) ===
No. overall	No. in season	Title	Original release date	Colombia viewers (Rating points)
1	1	"La carrera política de Guillermo León Mejía estará en riesgo por un oscuro secreto"	15 April 2020	11.4
2	2	"Desamparada, la vida de Ana Lucía corre peligro en manos de Guillermo León Mejía"	16 April 2020	13.6
3	3	"Ana Lucía encuentra en Andrea su única esperanza"	17 April 2020	14.0
4	4	"Analía regresa a Colombia para cumplirle la promesa a su madre"	20 April 2020	14.1
5	5	"Analía y Pablo De la Torre tienen un inesperado encuentro"	21 April 2020	12.4
6	6	"Guillermo León Mejía comienza su campaña a la presidencia de la mano de Analía"	22 April 2020	13.2
7	7	"Analía avanza en su plan de dividir a la familia de Mejía"	23 April 2020	12.7
8	8	"Un nuevo escándalo con su hijo empaña la campaña de Mejía"	24 April 2020	12.6
9	9	"Guillermo León Mejía ejecuta una nueva estrategia para controlar a su hijo"	27 April 2020	12.5
10	10	"Analía logra desestabilizar el matrimonio de Guillermo León Mejía"	28 April 2020	12.8
11	11	"Guillermo León Mejía podría perder el apoyo económico de los De la Torre"	29 April 2020	12.6
12	12	"El secuestro de Sofía tiene en tensión a toda la familia de Mejía"	30 April 2020	12.4
13	13	"Con ayuda de ‘Toto’, Analía logra dar con el paradero de Sofía Mejía"	4 May 2020	13.0
14	14	"La familia de Guillermo León Mejía son ahora su peor enemigo"	5 May 2020	13.9
15	15	"Manuel De la Torre les pide a sus hijos hacerse cargo del negocio familiar"	6 May 2020	13.1
16	16	"Liliana Camargo acepta ser parte de la campaña de León Mejía"	7 May 2020	13.0
17	17	"Analía descubre información crucial sobre su madre"	8 May 2020	11.9
18	18	"Analía modifica sus planes para no levantar sospechas"	11 May 2020	12.8
19	19	"Pablo De la Torre se reúne con el papá de Helena"	12 May 2020	11.5
20	20	"Rosario le ofrece a Mark darle información valiosa de su esposo"	13 May 2020	11.8
21	21	"Guillermo León Mejía visita a Manuel De la Torre y lo amenaza"	14 May 2020	11.5
22	22	"Guillermo León Mejía quiere sacarle provecho al divorcio de Pablo"	15 May 2020	10.5
23	23	"Pablo De la Torre enfrenta a Guillermo León Mejía antes del debate"	18 May 2020	12.2
24	24	"Mark juega sucio y logra desestabilizar a Guillermo León Mejía en el debate"	19 May 2020	11.6
25	25	"Analía busca la forma de volver a posicionar a Mejía en las encuestas"	20 May 2020	12.9
26	26	"A cambio de su divorcio, Rosario decide ayudar a Mejía con su hija"	21 May 2020	12.1
27	27	"Carolina le confiesa a Pablo quién estuvo detrás del escándalo de su divorcio"	22 May 2020	11.9
28	28	"¡Confirmado! Pablo De la Torre será el vicepresidente de Pérez"	26 May 2020	11.6
29	29	"Una dura pérdida enluta la vida de Pablo De la Torre"	27 May 2020	12.3
30	30	"Sofía y Juan Mario se proponen investigar el oscuro pasado de su padre"	28 May 2020	12.9
31	31	"Entre lágrimas, Analía le promete a su madre que Mejía pagará por su muerte"	29 May 2020	11.9
32	32	"Benji accede a información para investigar mejor a Sofía y a la familia Mejía"	1 June 2020	12.4
33	33	"Guillermo León Mejía le hace fuertes amenazas a Pablo De la Torre"	2 June 2020	12.5
34	34	"Santiago estuvo a punto de descubrir a Dorita con las manos en la masa"	3 June 2020	11.7
35	35	"Guillermo León Mejía y Pablo De la Torre tienen un fuerte enfrentamiento por Analía"	4 June 2020	12.2
36	36	"Juan Mario le pone vigilancia a la tumba de Darelis, ¿descubrirá a Analía?"	5 June 2020	11.9
37	37	"Mejía reta a Pérez para debatir ideas en la plaza pública"	8 June 2020	12.8
38	38	"Carolina sigue con sus planes de enfermar intencionalmente a su hija"	9 June 2020	13.1
39	39	"Analía tiene terribles pesadillas con Guillermo León Mejía"	10 June 2020	12.9
40	40	"Benji le toma comprometedoras fotos a Rosario con Mark para Analía"	11 June 2020	12.3
41	41	"Rosario le pide a Analía que no involucre más a Juan Mario"	12 June 2020	12.0
42	42	"Mejía cita a una rueda de prensa para dejar claro que no tiene miedo tras el atentado"	16 June 2020	13.5
43	43	"Guillermo le ofrece su ayuda a Carolina para vengarse de Pablo De la Torre"	17 June 2020	13.5
44	44	"Mejía expone los problemas familiares de Pablo De la Torre en el debate"	18 June 2020	12.9
45	45	"Analía visita a Santiago en la cárcel para pedirle pruebas en contra de Guillermo"	19 June 2020	12.6
46	46	"Analía descubre el macabro plan de Mejía pero no logra detenerlo"	23 June 2020	13.7
47	47	"Tras la muerte de Pérez, el partido le propone a Pablo continuar con la candidatura"	24 June 2020	14.1
48	48	"Andrea regresa a Colombia para apoyar a Analía en su plan"	25 June 2020	13.8
49	49	"Mark le revela información a Mejía para sabotear la campaña de Pablo"	26 June 2020	13.4
50	50	"Santiago amenaza a Mejía y logra recuperar su libertad"	30 June 2020	13.4
51	51	"Analía comienza a mover sus últimas cartas para hundir a Mejía"	1 July 2020	14.5
52	52	"Para salvar su vida, Analía deberá rendirse ante Mejía"	2 July 2020	15.2
53	53	"Analía logra su objetivo y el imperio de Guillermo León Mejía se desmorona"	3 July 2020	15.7

=== Season 2 (2025) ===
No. overall	No. in season	Title	Original release date	Colombia viewers (Rating points)
54	1	"Analía descubre que su peor pesadilla ha regresado"	21 May 2025	7.0
55	2	"Guillermo encuentra la forma de meterse en la cabeza de Carolina"	22 May 2025	6.6
56	3	"Santiago es dado de baja tras ayudar a Guillermo"	23 May 2025	4.8
57	4	"Guillermo en Libertad, Analía perseguida y Dorita en peligro"	26 May 2025	5.9
58	5	"Mejía provoca a Analía y le ataca a una ficha clave"	27 May 2025	6.0
59	6	"Mejía empieza amorío con Carolina, mientras Analía reacciona por su trampa"	28 May 2025	5.9
60	7	"Analía, en peligro y Pablo se queda sin fichas clave en la campaña"	29 May 2025	5.7
61	8	"Rosales intenta sacar de sus casillas a Pablo en el debate"	30 May 2025	4.9
62	9	"Otoniel muere en medio del debate de Pablo y Rosales"	3 June 2025	5.1
63	10	"Mejía busca ser la fórmula vicepresidencial de Rosales"	4 June 2025	5.8
64	11	"Mejía acepta ser la fórmula vicepresidencial de Rosales"	5 June 2025	4.4
65	12	"Paulina acaba con la vida de Elvira Ortega, esposa de Mariano"	6 June 2025	5.1
66	13	"Guillermo le da un golpe bajo a Analía en plena entrevista"	9 June 2025	5.5
67	14	"Guillermo ejecuta un plan para desarmar a Analía"	11 June 2025	5.5
68	15	"Guillermo es víctima de un atentado en su contra"	12 June 2025	6.5
69	16	"Analía es encarcelada por el atentado contra Mejía"	13 June 2025	6.2
70	17	"Las elecciones presidenciales se dan en medio de fraude y trampa"	16 June 2025	5.8
71	18	"Mejía le pide a Paulina detener los planes de atentar contra Analía, pero ella no hace caso"	17 June 2025	7.0
72	19	"Analía queda libre y busca a Paulina en la clínica"	18 June 2025	6.6
73	20	"Mejía se desespera porque Analía tiene retenida a Paulina"	19 June 2025	6.7
74	21	"Paulina se convierte el hazmerreír del país tras su liberación"	20 June 2025	6.5
75	22	"Cristina acaba con su vida tras una particular visita"	24 June 2025	6.2
76	23	"Analía se entera de que está embarazada"	26 June 2025	6.6
77	24	"Analía promete ocultarle su embarazo a Pablo"	27 June 2025	6.6
78	25	"El plan de Mejía para atentar contra la vida de Analía y Rosales"	1 July 2025	7.1
79	26	"Atentan contra Rosales y Analía"	2 July 2025	7.5
80	27	"Analía es perseguida por el asistente de Gerardo Bernal"	3 July 2025	6.8
81	28	"Mejía visita a Analía para confirmar la supuesta enfermedad"	4 July 2025	6.8
82	29	"Mejía adelanta su boda, pero Paulina lo traiciona"	7 July 2025	6.5
83	30	"Mejía se casa con Carolina, pero ella tiene una jugada maestra"	8 July 2025	7.4
84	31	"Mejía lleva al límite a Carolina y Analía avanza contra Bernal"	9 July 2025	6.8
85	32	"Mejía le tiende otra trampa a Rosales, pero él se le adelanta"	10 July 2025	7.1
86	33	"Mejía tiene todo listo para dar de baja a Rosales"	11 July 2025	7.1
87	34	"Rosales es dado de baja y Analía toma una decisión radical"	14 July 2025	7.0
88	35	"Mejía busca a Analía para culparla por la muerte de Rosales"	17 July 2025	7.3
89	36	"Analía intenta esconderse de Mejía y de los paramilitares"	18 July 2025	6.2
90	37	"Analía logra escapar de los paramilitares con ayuda de Sebastián"	21 July 2025	6.6
91	38	"Sebastián pone en riesgo su vida por proteger a Analía"	22 July 2025	6.1
92	39	"Mejía bombardea la zona donde está Analía para acabar con su vida"	23 July 2025	7.4
93	40	"Analía expone a Mejía y él crea un plan para mejorar su imagen"	24 July 2025	6.5
94	41	"Nace la hija de Analía con la ayuda de su familia"	29 July 2025	7.4
95	42	"Paulina atenta contra la vida de Pablo De la Torre"	30 July 2025	6.8
96	43	"Analía se entrega a la Fiscalía por la muerte de Rosales"	31 July 2025	7.4
97	44	"Analía empieza a trabajar con la Fiscalía"	1 August 2025	6.1
98	45	"Analía intenta evitar que Paulina exhume el cuerpo de Mariano"	4 August 2025	6.8
99	46	"Analía le presenta su hija a Pablo y él reacciona"	6 August 2025	6.1
100	47	"Paulina da el primer paso en su plan de acabar con Carolina"	8 August 2025	5.7
101	48	"Pablo reaparece ante las cámaras y confirma su estado de salud"	11 August 2025	6.5
102	49	"La vida de Carolina está en riesgo: Peña intenta darla de baja"	12 August 2025	6.8
103	50	"Mejía es envenenado y Paulina queda expuesta"	13 August 2025	7.8
104	51	"Paulina es encarcelada: Mejía tiene un plan para sacarla"	14 August 2025	7.2
105	52	"Mejía descubre el plan en su contra de Sofía y Analía"	15 August 2025	7.1
106	53	"Analía toma radical decisión para proteger a su hija"	19 August 2025	6.2
107	54	"Mejía sigue con su plan para atentar contra la vida de Carolina"	20 August 2025	6.7
108	55	"Mejía está detrás de Analía al sospechar que tiene una hija"	21 August 2025	6.3
109	56	"Toto es arrestado y Paulina atenta contra Fabiola y Dorita"	22 August 2025	6.6
110	57	"Carolina le revela a todos su enfermedad y Pablo intenta ayudarla"	25 August 2025	6.5
111	58	"Pablo sufre dolorosa pérdida y se enfrenta con Mejía"	26 August 2025	6.9
112	59	"Fiscalía abre una investigación por la muerte de Carolina"	28 August 2025	7.5
113	60	"Analía se desestabiliza al ver que Paulina se llevó su hija"	29 August 2025	7.0
114	61	"Analía se ve obligada a colaborarle a Mejía para acabar con Pablo"	1 September 2025	7.2
115	62	"Analía ve cómo Paulina atenta contra Pablo"	3 September 2025	7.4
116	63	"Resumen de momentos clave para la recta final"	5 September 2025	6.4
117	64	"Javier le propone a Paulina traicionar a Mejía"	8 September 2025	7.0
118	65	"Guillermo intenta recuperar el control sobre Paulina"	10 September 2025	7.0
119	66	"Paulina se entera que Pablo no está muerto"	11 September 2025	8.4
120	67	"Guillermo acaba con su vida tras recibir orden de captura"	12 September 2025	7.3

== Release ==
La venganza de Analía premiered on Caracol Televisión on 15 April 2020. Internationally, the show began streaming on Netflix on 26 August 2020, under the title Her Mother's Killer.

== Reception ==
The premiere episode recorded a 11.4 rating, positioning itself as the most viewed program alongside the series El General Naranjo. Since its premiere, many viewers have compared the series to Telemundo's telenovela El Rostro de Analía, but Caracol did not confirm that this series is a remake.

=== Ratings ===
Season	Timeslot (COT)	Episodes	First aired		Last aired		Avg. viewers (in points)
Season	Timeslot (COT)	Episodes	Date	Viewers (in points)	Date	Viewers (in points)	Avg. viewers (in points)
1	Mon–Fri 8:30 p.m.	53	15 April 2020	11.4	3 July 2020	15.7	12.8
2	Mon–Fri 9:30 p.m.	67	21 May 2025	7.0	12 September 2025	7.3	6.6

=== Awards and nominations ===
Year	Award	Category	Nominated	Result	Ref
2020	Produ Awards	Best Superseries	La venganza de Analía	Nominated	
2020	Produ Awards	Best Showrunner	Juana Uribe	Nominated	
2020	Produ Awards	Best Writers	Claudia Sánchez y Said Chamié	Nominated	
2021	India Catalina Awards	Best Telenovela, Series or Miniseries	Said Chamie y Claudia Sánchez	Nominated	
2021	India Catalina Awards	Best Lead Actress	Carolina Gómez	Won	
2021	India Catalina Awards	Best Supporting Actor	Edwin Maya	Nominated	
2021	India Catalina Awards	Best Antagonist Actress	Juliana Galvis	Nominated	
2021	India Catalina Awards	Best Antagonist Actor	Marlon Moreno	Won	
2021	India Catalina Awards	Best Child Talent	María Fernanda Duque	Nominated	
2021	India Catalina Awards	Best Director	Camilo Vega y Lucho Sierra	Won	
2021	India Catalina Awards	Best Screenplay	Said Chamie y Claudia Sánchez	Nominated	
2021	India Catalina Awards	Best Art Direction	Ana Paula Zamudio	Nominated	
2021	India Catalina Awards	Best Cinematography	Lukas Cristo	Nominated	
2021	India Catalina Awards	Best Editor	Marlon Cortés and Alejandro Arias	Nominated	
2021	India Catalina Awards	Favorite Production of the Public	La venganza de Analía	Nominated	
2021	India Catalina Awards	Favorite Talent of the Public	Marlon Moreno	Nominated	
