= Gente bien (TV series) =

- Genre: Telenovela; Romance; Drama
- Created by: Lucy Orozco; Antonio Serrano
- Written by: Lucy Orozco; Humberto Robles; Antonio Noyola
- Directed by: Francisco Franco; Alfredo Gurrola
- Starring: Patricia Manterola; Mario Cimarro; Helena Rojo; César Évora; Isela Vega
- Opening theme: Gente bien by Jorge Avendaño
- Ending theme: Si tú quisieras by Patricia Manterola
- Country of origin: Mexico
- Original language: Spanish
- No. of episodes: 80

Production
- Executive producer: Lucy Orozco
- Producers: Humberto Robles; Juan Manuel Orozco
- Production locations: Filming; Televisa San Ángel; Mexico City, Mexico
- Cinematography: Carlos Sánchez Zúñiga; Isabel Basurto; Leopoldo Terrazas
- Running time: 41-44 minutes
- Production company: Televisa

Original release
- Network: Canal de las Estrellas
- Release: April 28 – August 15, 1997

Gente bien (English: Well-off People) is a Mexican telenovela produced by Lucy Orozco for Televisa in 1997.

On Monday, April 28, 1997, Canal de las Estrellas started broadcasting Gente bien weekdays at 7:00 p.m., replacing Mi querida Isabel. The last episode was broadcast on Friday, August 15, 1997 with Amada enemiga replacing it the following Monday.

Patricia Manterola and Mario Cimarro starred as protagonists, while the leading actors César Évora and Julián Pastor starred as antagonists. The leading actresses María Rivas, Isela Vega, Helena Rojo and Ana Martín starred as stellar performances.

== Synopsis ==
María is a hard-working and honest young woman who provides her services at a pharmaceutical company called Balmori Laboratories. Unfortunately, she is forced to quit her job because her boss, Adolfo Klein, attempted to rape her.

After the incident, María gets a job at the prestigious factory of Jaime Dumas, a businessman connected to the mafia. He is Adolfo's relative and partner. When Jaime's father died he left his entire inheritance to his wife Sara and she left Jaime in charge to take care of the factory, since he is the eldest son.

Alicia, Jaime's sister, is Adolfo's wife. Rebeca is Jaime's wife, and when she finds out that Adolfo tried to rape María, a terrible scandal is created around the family.

Jaime meets María and tries to seduce her. Luckily, María meets Gerardo, an environmentalist who is investigating, gathering evidence, and fighting against Jaime Dumas and his factory, since it distributes prohibited substances and illegal pesticides. María and Gerardo fall in love, but many circumstances separate them.

== Cast ==
- Patricia Manterola as María Figueroa
- Mario Cimarro as Gerardo Felipe
- Helena Rojo as Rebecca Balmori de Dumas
- César Évora as Jaime Dumas
- Isela Vega as Mercedes Figueroa
- Ana Martín as Alicia Dumas de Klein
- María Rivas as Doña Sara Viuda de Dumas "Mamá Sara"
- Julián Pastor as Dr. Adolfo Klein
- Patricia Bernal as Angélica Medina
- Daniel Gauvry as Rafael Lazcano
- Alec Von Bargen as Mauricio Dumas
- Ariadne Welter as Consuelo
- Marta Aura as Márgara
- Bárbara Eibenshutz as Liz Dumas
- Jorge Capin as Wolf
- Leif Janivitz as Benjamín Klein
- Masha Kostiurina as Sabina Klein
- Gabriela Murray as Yolanda
- Felipe Nájera as Diego
- Genoveva Pérez as Amaranta
- Alicia del Lago as Conchita
- Claudette Maillé as Ximena
- Ariane Pellicer as Celia
- Rubén Rojo Aura as Jaimito Dumas
- Bruno Schwebel as Father Bernardo
- Jorge Zárate as Esteban
- José Luis Avendaño as Baltazar
- Raquel Garza as Martita
- Marcela Morett as Reina
- Vicky Rodel as Vicky
- Paloma Woolrich as Irma
- Salma Hayek as Teresa
- Rafael Mercadante
- Héctor Sáez
- Quintín Bulnes
- Yaoli Bello
- Ernesto Bog
- Wenceslao Rangel
- Polo Salazar
- Eduardo Liñán
- Ramón Abascal
