= La casa en la playa =

Mexican telenovela

- Genre: Telenovela
- Starring: Cynthia Klitbo; Sergio Goyri; Marga López; Blanca Guerra; José Carlos Ruiz; Mariana Levy; David Ostrosky; Mario Cimarro; Yadhira Carrillo; Sebastián Ligarde; Ignacio López Tarso
- Opening theme: "Dónde está la vida" by Francisco Céspedes
- Country of origin: Mexico
- Original language: Spanish
- No. of episodes: 65

Production
- Executive producers: Yuri Breña; Pinkye Morris

Original release
- Network: Canal de las Estrellas
- Release: April 10 – July 7, 2000

La casa en la playa (The Beach House) is a Mexican telenovela produced in 2000.

It stars Cynthia Klitbo, Sergio Goyri, Marga López, Blanca Guerra, José Carlos Ruiz, Mariana Levy, David Ostrosky, Mario Cimarro, Yadhira Carrillo, Sebastián Ligarde and Ignacio López Tarso.

== Cast ==
=== Main ===
- Cynthia Klitbo as Paulina Villarreal Viuda de Rojo
- Sergio Goyri as Juan Carlos Cabrera
- Marga López as Serena Rivas
- Blanca Guerra as Marina de Villarreal
- José Carlos Ruiz as Severo Rincón
- Mariana Levy as Elisa White de Villarreal
- David Ostrosky as César Villarreal
- Mario Cimarro as Roberto Villarreal
- Yadhira Carrillo as Georgina Salas
- Sebastián Ligarde as Salvador Villarreal
- Ignacio López Tarso as Ángel Villarreal

=== Recurring ===
- Polo Ortín as Lawyer Zamora
- Gerardo Albarrán as Marco Antonio Villasaña
- Katie Barberi as Florencia Uribe
- Héctor Cruz as Juan José "Juanjo" Gómez
- Radamés de Jesús as Tencho
- César Castro as Dr. Álvaro Serrano
- Valentino Lanús as Miguel Ángel Villarreal
- Paula Sánchez as Pía Villarreal de Estrada
- Ernesto Rivas as Hugo Estrada
- Luis Reynoso as Lieutenant Larios
- Carlos Speitzer as Paolo Rojo Villarreal
- Marisol del Olmo as Mireya Rodríguez
- Anthony Álvarez as Demián Garza
- Hilda Aguirre as Casandra del Junco
- Mario Iván Martínez as Harry Furman
- Mónica Miguel as María Estrada

== Awards and nominations ==
Year	Award	Category	Nominee	Result
2001
2001	Latin ACE Awards			
2001	Latin ACE Awards	International Male Figure of the Year	Sergio Goyri	Won
2001	Latin ACE Awards	Best Actress	Cynthia Klitbo	Won
2001	Latin ACE Awards	Best Co-lead Actress	Blanca Guerra	Won
2001	Latin ACE Awards	Best Supporting Actor	Ernesto Rivas	Won
2001	Latin ACE Awards	Best Character Actress	Marga López	Won
2001	Latin ACE Awards	Best Character Actor	José Carlos Ruiz	Won
2001	Latin ACE Awards	Best Direction	Enrique Gómez-Vadillo	Won
