= Ana María Abello =

Colombian actress

Ana María Abello (Bogotá, 4 October 1979) is a Colombian actress, recognized mainly for having played Fabiana in the Colombian television series, the popular: Padres e hijos, where her television debut was, on that series in 1998, in the Padres e hijos. Since then, she has participated in well-known television series in her native country such as La Baby Sister, María Madrugada, Francisco el Matemático and La magia de Sofía.

== Television ==
- Padres e hijos (1998) — Fabiana
- La Baby Sister (2000) — Catalina
- María Madrugada (2002) — Judy
- El precio del silencio (2002) — Catalina
- La venganza (2002 TV series) (2002) — Adoración
- Francisco el Matemático (2004) — Mariana
- La sucursal del cielo (2007) — Judy
- La Magia de Sofia (2010) — Leonor
- Infiltrados (2011)
- ¿Quién mató a Patricia Soler? (2015) —

== Films ==
In Marilyn y un Par de Ases (2000) as Connie.
