= Kristina Lilley =

American-Colombian actress

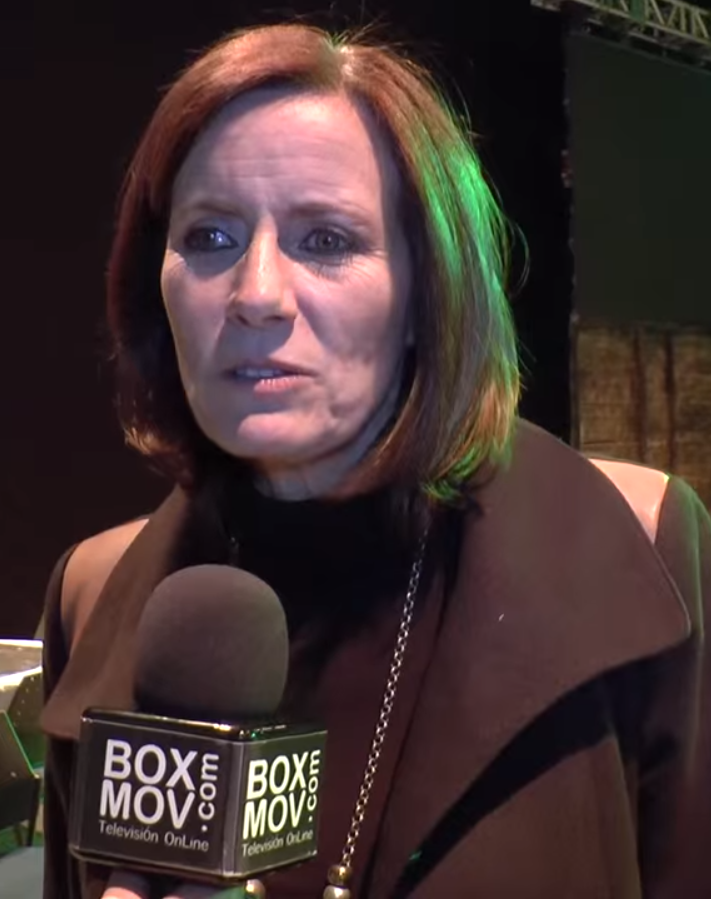
- Lilley in 2015
- Born: 31 August 1963 (age 62); New York City, U.S.
- Citizenship: United States; Colombia
- Occupation: Actress
- Years active: 1976–present
- Height: 1.70 m (5 ft 7 in)
- Spouse: Óscar Suárez (?-2004)
- Partner: Mauricio Lombana (2009)
- Children: 2

Kristina Lilley (Spanish pronunciation: [kɾisˈtina ˈlili]; born 31 August 1963) is an American and Colombian actress.

== Biography ==
Kristina Lilley was born in New York City. She is the daughter of John Lilley, an American diplomat and Norwegian mother, Ellen Christensen, who was born in Bergen. Her family moved to Colombia when she was three years old.

She studied biology at the Pontifical Xavierian University before becoming an actress. She speaks both Spanish, and English with a New York accent fluently.

In 2022, she reprised her role as Gabriela Acevedo de Elizondo, in the second season of Pasión de Gavilanes.

== Movies ==
Year	Movie	Character	Director
2004	Rosario Tijeras	Emilio's mom	Emilio Maillé
2007	Amores ilícitos		
2009	The Whole Truth	Detective Winslow	
2010	Plata o plomo	Beatriz	
2012	El paseo 2	Isabel	Harold Trompetero
2016	Cinco		Riccardo Gabrielli R.
2017	Orbiter 9	Katherine	Hatem Khraiche
2017	The Belko Experiment	Sarah Mariana	Greg McLean
2017	Regreso a casa	Barbara Clarke	
2018	¿Cómo te llamas?	Celia	Ruth Caudeli
2019	Perseguida	Francisca Suárez	Yesid Leone Moreno

== Television ==
Year	Title	Character	Channel
1976	Amigas		
1976-1978	The Wilson Family		Inravisión
1988	Jeremias mujeres mías		
1989	Azúcar	Alejandrina Vallecilla	Canal A
1990	Laura por favor	Laura's mom	Canal A
1991	La casa de las dos palmas	Matilde Herreros	Canal A
1992	Sangre de lobos	Carolina Millán	Canal A
1993	Señora Isabel	Rosario Domínguez	Canal 1
1993	Pasiones secretas	Delfina Fonseca de Estévez	Canal 1
1994	Almas de Piedra	Laura de Guzmán	Canal 1
1994	Amanda, tortas y suspiros	Leticia Córdoba	Canal 1
1995	La otra mitad del sol	Soledad	Canal A
1995	El manantial	María Julia Arciniegas	Canal A
1996	Copas amargas	Marcela Londoño	Canal A
1996	Las ejecutivas	Mónica Uribe	Caracol Televisión
1998	Dios se lo pague	Ofelia Spencer de Richardson	Caracol Televisión
1998	La dama del pantano	Katia	Caracol Televisión
2003–2022	Pasión de Gavilanes	Gabriela Acevedo	Telemundo / Caracol Televisión
2004-2005	La mujer en el espejo	Regina Soler	Telemundo / Caracol Televisión
2005-2006	La tormenta	Edelmira Carranza de Guerrero	Telemundo
2005-2007	Decisiones	Linda / Gineth	Telemundo
2006	Alma Pirata	Miriam	Telefe
2007	Dame Chocolate	Grace Remington	Telemundo
2009	El penúltimo beso	Victoria	RCN Televisión
2010	Chepe Fortuna	Malvina Samper Vda. de Cabrales	RCN Televisión
2010	Decisiones extremas		Telemundo
2011	La Traicionera	Ana María "Annie" de Sanint	RCN Televisión
2011-2015	Mujeres al límite	Eugenia / Lina / Patricia Salgado	Caracol Televisión
2012	Mujeres asesinas	Nina	RCN Televisión
2013-2015	Cumbia Ninja	Aurelia	Fox
2014	La viuda negra		UniMás
2015	¿Quién mató a Patricia Soler?	Alba Sinisterra	Mundo Fox
2015	Esmeraldas	Adult Esmeralda Ortega	Caracol Televisión
2015	Celia	Judge	Telemundo
2015	La pelu	Pato	Citytv
2015-2016	Dulce amor	Elena Vargas Vda. de Toledo / Elena Vargas de Fernández	Caracol Televisión
2016-2019	Heart's Decree	María Eugenia Domínguez	RCN Televisión
2017	Venganza	Rosaura Castillo	RCN Televisión
2017	El Comandante	Megan Bradley	RCN Televisión
2017	Polvo carnavalero	Ester	Caracol Televisión
2017	Infieles		Canal 1
2018	La mamá del 10	Eugenia Velasco	Caracol Televisión
2019	El Barón	Ana Farley	Telemundo
2019	Más allá del tiempo	Benedikta Zur Nieden de Echavarría	Teleantioquia
2019-2020	El General Naranjo	Marina de Luque	Star Premium
2020	La Nocturna	Julia Vda. de Velandia	Caracol Televisión
2020	Decisiones: Unos ganan, otros pierden	Nicole	Telemundo
2020	La venganza de Analía	Andrea Correa / Susana Guerrero	Caracol Televisión
2021	Nurses	Sofía de Mackenzie	Canal RCN
2021	Lala's Spa	Lucía Ponce de León	Canal RCN

== Personal life ==
She married Óscar Suárez at a young age, divorcing in 2003 after having two daughters. In 2009, she was in a relationship with Colombian philosopher, Mauricio Lombana.
