= Pasión de Gavilanes =

Television series

- Created by: Julio Jimenez
- Developed by: Telemundo Studios; RTI Colombia
- Directed by: Rodrigo Triana; Sergio Osorio; Camilo Vega
- Starring: Danna García; Mario Cimarro; Paola Rey; Jorge Cao; Alfonso Baptista; Michel Brown; Gloria Gómez; Kristina Lilley; Natasha Klauss; Ana Lucía Domínguez; Zharick León; Juan Sebastián Aragón; Juan Pablo Shuk
- Theme music composer: Nicolás Uribe
- Opening theme: "Fiera inquieta" (Note: Performed by Ángela María Forero in the first season, and Olga Castillo "Guita" in the second season.)
- Composer: Nicolás Uribe
- Country of origin: Colombia
- Original language: Spanish
- No. of seasons: 2
- No. of episodes: 259

Production
- Executive producers: Hugo León Ferrer; Marcos Santana; Karen Barroeta; Harold Sánchez; Clara María Ochoa; Ana Piñeres
- Production locations: Boyacá, Colombia
- Running time: 42-45 minutes

Original release
- Network: Telemundo; Caracol Televisión
- Release: 21 October 2003 – 31 May 2022

Related
- Las aguas mansas (1994); Fuego en la sangre (2008); Gavilanes (2010); Tierra de reyes (2014); Pasión de Amor (2015)

Pasión de Gavilanes (international title: Hidden Passion) is a Colombian telenovela written by Julio Jiménez. It is produced by RTI Colombia in conjunction with the Telemundo network and with the participation of Caracol TV company. The telenovela is based on the 1994 telenovela Las aguas mansas, also written by Jiménez and produced by RTI. It premiered on Telemundo on 21 October 2003, while in Colombia it premiered on Caracol TV.

On 12 May 2021, Telemundo announced a second season through its upfront for the 2021–2022 television season, taking place 20 years after the events of the original series. Production of the season began on 18 October 2021. The season premiered on 14 February 2022, and ended on 31 May 2022.

== Plot ==
=== Series overview ===
Series	Episodes	Originally released	
Series	Episodes	First released	Last released
1	188	21 October 2003	14 September 2004
2	71	14 February 2022	31 May 2022

=== Season 1 ===
Bernardo Elizondo owns a ranch where he lives with his wife, Doña Gabriela; his daughters, Norma, Jimena, and Sara; Norma's husband, Fernando Escandón; and his father-in-law, Don Martín Acevedo, a retired and paralyzed military officer.

Norma and Fernando's marriage was arranged by Doña Gabriela to hide the fact that Norma had been a victim of rape. However, the marriage is in name only and has not been consummated due to Norma's trauma. Furthermore, Gabriela is in love with Fernando, which is why she forces her daughter to marry him to keep him close.

Although Bernardo is in love with Libia Reyes, a humble young woman, he knows he cannot marry her because Gabriela, a despotic and old-fashioned woman, would never grant him a divorce. Despite this, Bernardo is determined to break away from everything to live his love with Libia and decides to formally introduce himself to the young woman's brothers: Juan, Óscar, and Franco Reyes. Although they initially disapprove of the relationship, they eventually accept it, considering that their sister's happiness depends on it.

Bernardo dies in a horseback riding accident. At the same time, Libia discovers she is pregnant and, upon learning of Bernardo's death, decides to go to the Elizondo house to claim the money that is rightfully hers. However, she is frightened and unsure whether she should go. When she finally arrives at the ranch, Doña Gabriela humiliates and scorns her family. Desperate, Libia flees and ends up committing suicide by jumping off a bridge.

When the Reyes brothers learn what happened, they vow to avenge their sister's death. To do so, they go to the Elizondo ranch, posing as construction workers hired by Doña Gabriela to build a cabin intended for Norma and Fernando. This plan is made possible with the help of Eva Rodríguez, the Elizondos' housekeeper, who also seeks revenge against Gabriela, as she was forced to give up her only daughter, Ruth, for lacking the means to support her.

Upon meeting the Elizondo sisters, Óscar Reyes tries to convince his brothers to abandon their plans for revenge and instead seduce the sisters to "pay them back in kind." However, his true intention is to obtain the Elizondos' money to improve his financial situation. His brother Juan disagrees with this plan but changes his mind after meeting Norma, as the two feel an immediate attraction.

This attraction makes Juan completely forget his plans for revenge, although the relationship between him and Norma will face numerous obstacles that they must overcome together.

=== Season 2 ===
Twenty years after the events of the original series, the Reyes Elizondo family is living in San Marcos and has become prominent in the local community. Their lives are disrupted when Erick and León Reyes, the twin sons of Juan and Norma, are accused of murder. The investigation and its consequences affect Juan and Norma, Oscar & Jimena and Franco & Sara, as well as the couples' now-adult children, whose own relationships and conflicts become central to the story.

== Cast ==
=== Main cast ===
- Danna García as Norma Elizondo Acevedo de Reyes; Bernardo and Gabriela's eldest daughter, Sara and Jimena’s older sister, Juan's wife, Juan David, Leon and Erick's mother
- Mario Cimarro as Juan "Juancho" Reyes Guerrero, Oscar, Franco's and Libia's older brother, Ruth's maternal cousin, Norma's second husband and Juan David, Leon and Erick's father
- Paola Rey as Jimena Elizondo Acevedo de Reyes; Bernardo and Gabriela's youngest daughter, Norma and Sara's younger sister, Oscar's wife and Duván's stepmother
- Alfonso Baptista as Óscar Reyes Guerrero; Juan's younger brother, Franco and Libia's older brother, Ruth's maternal cousin, Jimena's husband and Duván's father
- Natasha Klauss as Sara "Sarita" Elizondo Acevedo de Reyes, Bernardo and Gabriela's second daughter, Norma and Jimena's sister, Franco's wife and Andres and Gaby's mother
- Michel Brown as Franco Reyes Guerrero; Juan and Oscar's younger brother, Libia's older brother, Ruth's maternal cousin, Rosario's ex-lover, Eduvina's ex-husband, Sara's husband and Andres and Gaby's father
- Jorge Cao (season 1) and Germán Quintero (season 2) as Martín Acevedo; Gabriela's father, Norma, Jimena and Sara's grandfather, and Juan David's great-grandfather
- Kristina Lilley as Gabriela Acevedo de Elizondo/Gabriela Acevedo Escándon; Martin's daughter, Bernardo's widow, Norma, Jimena and Sara's mother, and Fernando's former second wife, Juan David, Leon, Erick, Gaby and Andres Reyes grandmother, Oscar's, Franco's and Juan's mother-in-law
- Ana Lucía Domínguez as Libia Reyes Guerrero / Ruth Uribe Santos / Ruth Guerrero Rodríguez (season 1; the same actress who played two different characters). Libia is Juan, Oscar, and Franco's younger sister, and Bernardo's former lover, aunt of Juan David, Leon, Erick, Andres and Gaby. Ruth is Eva's long-lost biological daughter and the Reyes siblings' maternal cousin as her dad is Aníbal Guerrero (The Reyes sibling's mom's brother)
- Gloria Gómez as Eva Rodríguez (season 1); Housekeeper of Elizondo household, Norma, Jimena and Sara's nanny/mother-figure and Ruth's biological mother
- Zharick León as Rosario Montes; Franco's former lover, Armando's widow, Samuel's wife and Muriel's mother
- Juan Sebastián Aragón as Armando Navarro (season 1); Rosario's husband; a powerful henchman who takes avenge against Juan, Oscar and Franco
- Juan Pablo Shuk as Fernando Escandón (season 1); Norma and Gabriela's ex-husband; Armando's criminal mastermind
- Lorena Meritano as Dínora Rosales (season 1); was in love with Juan
- Bernardo Flores as Juan David Reyes (season 2), Juan and Norma's eldest son
- Camila Rojas as Muriel Caballero Montes (season 2), Rosario and Samuel's only daughter, Juan David's wife, Norma and Juan's daughter-in-law
- Juan Manuel Restrepo as León Reyes (season 2), Erick's twin and Juan David's younger brother. Juan and Norma's son
- Sebastián Osorio as Erick Reyes (season 2), León's twin and Juan David's younger brother. Juan and Norma's son
- Yare Santana as Gabriela "Gaby" Reyes (season 2), Sara and Franco's daughter, Andrés Reyes's sister
- Jerónimo Cantillo as Andrés Reyes (season 2), Sara and Franco's son, Gaby's brother
- Ángel de Miguel as Albin Duarte (season 2)
- Alejandro López as Demetrio Jurado (season 2)
- Boris Schoemann as Pablo Gunter (season 2), Rosario's employee
- Katherine Porto as Romina Clemente (season 2), had an affair with Oscar

=== Recurring cast ===
- Germán Rojas as Bernardo Elizondo (season 1); Gabriela's ex-husband, Libia's former lover, Norma, Jimena and Sara's father, Juan David, Leon, Erick, Andres and Gaby's maternal grandfather
- Talú Quintero as Eduvina Trueba (season 1); Franco's ex wife
- Valeria García as Juan David Reyes Elizondo (season 1); Norma and Juan's son
- Lady Noriega as María Josefa "Pepita" Ronderos
- Consuelo Luzardo as Melissa Santos (season 1)
- Julio del Mar as Leonidas Coronado (season 1)
- Andrés Felipe Martínez as Malcolm Ríos (season 1); works for Fernando
- Clemencia Guillén as Carmela Gordillo (season 1); works for Fernando
- Sebastián Boscán as Leandro Santos (season 1); Ruth's adoptive cousin, Benito's brother and Jimena's gay friend
- Andrea Villareal as Panchita López (season 1)
- Alberto Marulanda as Miguel Barragán (season 1)
- Carlos Alberto Sánchez as Manolo Barragán (season 1)
- Inés Prieto as Hortencia Garrido de Barragán (season 1)
- Sigifredo Vega as Filemón Barragán (season 1)
- Carmenza González as Quintina Canosa
- Pedro Roda as Olegario (season 1)
- Fernando Corredor as Calixto Uribe (season 1); Ruth's adoptive father
- Maria Margarita Giraldo as Raquel Santos de Uribe (season 1); Ruth's adoptive mother
- Giovanni Suarez Forero as Benito Santos (season 1), Ruth's adoptive cousin
- Vilma Vera as Magnolia Bracho (season 1)
- Samuel Hernández as Zacarías Rosales (season 1)
- Jacqueline Henríquez as Úrsula de Rosales (season 1)
- Leonelia González as Belinda Rosales (season 1)
- Ricardo Herrera as Antonio Coronado (season 1), Ruth's boyfriend
- Jaime Gutiérrez as Jaime Bustillo (season 1)
- Pilar Álvarez as Violeta Villas (season 1)
- Víctor Rodríguez as Memo Duque (season 1)
- Tatiana Jauregui as Dominga, Elizondo's maid
- Alexander Palacio as Rubinsky (season 1)
- Herbert King as Herzog (season 1)
- Margarita Durán as Ceci (season 1)
- Liliana Calderón as Nidia (season 1)
- Margarita Amado as Rosita (season 1)
- Guillermo Villa as the father Epifanio (season 1)
- Ana Soler as Emilce (season 1)
- Helga Díaz as Betina (season 1)
- Carlos Duplat as Agapito Cortéz (season 1)
- Constanza Hernández as Panchita López (season 2); Rosario's employee
- Jacobo Montalvo as Duván Clemente (season 2); Oscar and Romina's son, Jimena's stepson
- Jonathan Bedoya as Nino Barcha (season 2); Gaby's late boyfriend
- Sebastián Vega (season 2)
- Valeria Caicedo as Sibila (season 2); Erick's fiance
- Álvaro García (season 2)

=== Guest stars ===
- Sergio Goyri as Samuel Caballero (season 2); Rosario's husband, Muriel's father, Juan David's father-in-law

== Awards and nominations ==
Year	Award	Category	Nominated	Result	Ref
2004	TVyNovelas Awards	Best Telenovela	Pasión de Gavilanes	Won	
2004	TVyNovelas Awards	Best Antagonist Actress	Lorena Meritano	Won	
2004	TVyNovelas Awards	Best Supporting Actress	Natasha Klauss	Nominated	
2004	TVyNovelas Awards	Best Supporting Actor	Jorge Cao	Won	
2004	TVyNovelas Awards	Best Screenplay	Julio Jiménez	Won	
2004	TVyNovelas Awards	Best Directing	Rodrigo Triana and Mauricio Cruz	Won	
2004	India Catalina Awards	Best Telenovela	Pasión de Gavilanes	Won	
2004	India Catalina Awards	Best Supporting Actress	Zharick León	Won	
2022	Produ Awards	Best Short Telenovela	Pasión de Gavilanes	Nominated	
2022	Produ Awards	Best Music Theme - Superseries or Telenovela	"Fiera inquieta" by Olga Castillo "Guita"	Nominated	
2022	Produ Awards	Best Lead Actress - Superseries or Telenovela	Danna García	Nominated	
2022	Produ Awards	Best Lead Actor - Superseries or Telenovela	Michel Brown	Nominated	
2022	Produ Awards	Best Directing - Superseries or Telenovela	Rodrigo Triana, Sergio Osorio, and Camilo Vega	Nominated	
2022	Produ Awards	Best Fiction Production - Superseries or Telenovela	Karen Barroeta, Marcos Santana, Harold Sánchez, Clara María Ochoa, and Ana Piñeres	Nominated	
2022	Produ Awards	Best Screenplay - Superseries or Telenovela	Julio Jiménez and Iván Martínez	Nominated	

== Adaptions ==
=== Philippine adaptation ===
In the 2nd quarter of 2015, ABS-CBN announced RTI Producciones (in partnership with Caracol Televisión) and Telemundo have given to permit to do a Pinoy version of the series known as Pasión de Amor starring Jake Cuenca, Arci Muñoz, Ejay Falcon, Ellen Adarna, Joseph Marco and Coleen Garcia. Pasión de Amor premiered on June 1, 2015 and ended on February 26, 2016 with a total of 194 episodes in 3 seasons.
