= La Magia de Sofia =

2010 Colombian children telenovela

La magia de Sofía or Sofía's magic or Sofia's World of Magic is a Colombian children's telenovela, produced by Colombiana de Televisión for Caracol Television in 2010. Starring Nicolás Nocetti, Isabela Córdoba and the girl Sara Pinzón as Sofía.

Also, Dora Cadavid's son, Moisés Cadavid worked with Caracol in producing the show.

La Magia de Sofía is told through Sofia's eyes and is about a girl who will have to face the unknown from the curiosity of someone who does not understand adult life yet.

It depicts a young girl's inspired attempt to understand the adults around her, the world they live in and their inexplicable talent to choose complication over simplicity, a simplicity she knows well from the stories her grandfather always read to her.

== Synopsis ==
Sofia is a young girl who attempts to understand the complexities of adult life and the challenges faced by those around her. Seeking answers, she reflects on stories told by her grandfather and father, drawing connections between their experiences and situations in her own life. Through her imagination, Sofia envisions alternative outcomes and happy endings to the difficulties encountered by adults. The telenovela features a cast that includes established actors such as Nicolas Nocetti, Isabela Córdoba, Federico Amando and Ana Victoria Beltran, alongside emerging performers Sara Pinzón, Daniel Medina, Margarita Duran, Santiago Cepeda and Tatiana Santos.

== Cast ==
- Sara Pinzón: Sofía Protagonist (Gabeto's daughter)
- Nicolás Nocetti: Gabeto Protagonist (Father of Sofía and in love with María Clara)
- Isabela Córdoba: María Clara Protagonist (In Love with Gabeto, Cousin of Ernesto and Sebastián)
- Guest starring, Ana María Abello as Leonor

== Internationally ==
United States: Media World Venezuela: Televen United Mexican States: Quiero TV, Televisa.
