= La mujer en el espejo =

- Developed by: Telemundo Studios
- Written by: Consuelo Garrido
- Directed by: Rodolfo Hoyos; Ricardo Suárez
- Starring: Paola Rey; Juan Alfonso Baptista; Gabriela Vergara; Natasha Klauss; Paulo César Quevedo; Rossana Fernández Maldonado; Andrés Felipe Martínez; Kristina Lilley; Gloria Gómez; Javier Gómez
- Theme music composer: Edgar Amaya; Mariana Suarez
- Opening theme: La mujer en el espejo by Mariana Suárez and Edgar Amaya
- Country of origin: Colombia
- Original language: Spanish
- No. of episodes: 151

Production
- Producer: Hugo León Ferrer
- Production location: Bogotá
- Editor: Juan Manuel Andrade
- Camera setup: Multi-camera
- Running time: 42-45 minutes
- Production company: RTI Producciones

Original release
- Network: Telemundo (USA); Caracol Television (Colombia)
- Release: December 7, 2004 – July 18, 2005

Related
- Prisionera; El Cuerpo del Deseo

La Mujer en el Espejo (The Woman in the Mirror) is a Colombian soap opera (telenovela) by RTI Television for Telemundo in 2004. It is a re-adaptation of the homonymous Colombian soap opera “Woman in the Mirror” produced by RTI Productions in 1997.

Starring Paola Rey and Juan Alfonso Baptista, and with the participation of Gabriela Vergara. It also features performances by Natasha Klauss, Kristina Lilley, and Javier Gómez.

== Plot ==
=== Primary plot: Juliana and Marcos ===
Juliana Soler is a young woman. Her mother, Regina Soler, was a renowned model who is obsessed with physical beauty and has always led her daughter to believe that she is ugly, so Juliana does not give importance to her physical appearance. Despite her teasing, Juliana loves her mother above all else.

Mercedes, Juliana's aunt, has always loved and supported her as she is and has comforted her before the insults and criticism of her mother. Juliana has learned to prepare with her a variety of concoctions and potions with herbs. Mercedes keeps a great secret: a magic mirror prepared by herself especially for Juliana's future. After the death of her aunt, Juliana decides (without knowing that the mirror had hidden magic) to keep and take care of her aunt's mirror, always keeping it covered, since her aunt always said to her: nobody could be seen in it.

Thanks to the magic mirror, Juliana becomes the beautiful Maritza Ferrer, a chemical engineer capable of achieving everything she sets out to do with a smile. However, that dream will only last during the day, because at nightfall Juliana will be the same as ever.

As Maritza, Juliana meets Marcos Mutti, Gabriel Mutti's adoptive son, owner of the largest cosmetic brand in the country. The young man becomes the great love of Maritza and Juliana's confidant without knowing that it is the same woman.

Her best friend, a dancer at the dance academy, Luzmila is the first to discover her secret and helps cover up her identity in order to support and uplift her friend's confidence.

Juliana, like Maritza, becomes pregnant with Marcos' child, and they decide to get married, but Bárbara (Gabriel's wife) together with Alberto and Romero (their accomplices) devises a plan to blame Maritza for all the frauds they have committed in their company and send her to jail. On the day after Maritza and Marcos' marriage, police officers appeared looking for Maritza with an arrest warrant. The dance teacher, Paco Tapia, (Juliana's godfather and connoisseur of the secret of the mirror), advises her to flee; but the police start a chase. On the way, they meet a thief who, after having robbed a gas station, takes them hostage to escape without realizing that the police were already chasing them. She shoots Master Tapia and leaves her on the road, leaving only Maritza.

Maritza manages to save herself by falling outside while he was rolling. A herbalist finds her and tries to steal some boots that she wore when she believed she was dead, but discovers that she is still alive and decides to heal her so that Maritza's family would reward her for saving her (not knowing that she was actually a fugitive from the law).

Maritza (Juliana) loses the child in her womb due to the accident. When it gets dark, she turns into Juliana and the herbalist is scared and abandons her, believing she was the devil.

Juan Tobías Fonseca finds Juliana and takes her to a clinic in a nearby town, where he finds out that she was pregnant and that she has lost the child she was expecting. He also learns the secret, because he sees how Juliana becomes Maritza at daylight.

On the other hand, Juliana does not know that she is the only biological daughter of Gabriel Mutti, because years ago, Gabriel and Regina had a beautiful adventure of which Juliana was the fruit. However, Regina, at first out of pride and then, also ashamed of the appearance of her daughter, never told Gabriel, because she does not want the great love of her life to discover that they have such an ugly daughter.

Throughout the love story between Marcos and Maritza, great trials, fears, insecurities, rivals, greed, and silence will be interposed. Desperate, Barbara realizes that Juan Tobías had told Maritza what happened between them and for fear of revenge, she sends Pedro Barajas (Luzmila's ex and father to her sons) to kill Maritza.

Barbara eventually goes to the academy to kill Maritza herself, and she enters Aunt Mercedes' laboratory, she hides in the closet. After crying, Maritza who was with Luzmila becomes Juliana, thus leading Barbara to discover the secret/

After what happened, Barbara goes crazy and goes into Regina's house and with threats asks her to explain what she saw. As Regina did not know the secret, Barbara mistreated and beat her. Paco goes to Regina's house with Don Néstor (Juan Tobías' father) they open the door and discover Barbara who finally manages to escape and after arriving at Alberto's house she meets Gabriel; who had just come from talking to Lieutenant Andrade, who was already aware of Barbara's past and because of this they have a strong discussion.

The next day, Maritza has to go to read Juan Tobías's will when he arrives at the office of Mr. Casillas (who had been assassinated by Bárbara). Barbara appears with a can of gasoline and, after having tied Maritza, burns the office. The murderer with the black gloves (Cristina) locks the door and Barbara, unable to leave, becomes nervous, slips and burns completely. After a time in the hospital, Bárbara escapes with the help of Romero to the old cellar of the Empresas Mutti, where she sees herself in a mirror: her face was totally disfigured, and her hair had been burned. She had physically become what she was inside: a monster. Seeing her completely disfigured face, Barbara breaks the mirror and takes a glass to cut her wrists and commit suicide, because she prefers to die than to live like this. But, she remembers the mirror and decides to steal it and becomes Maritza Ferrer to recover the Mutti companies and obtain Juan Tobías' inheritance.

Juliana decides, after many things have happened, to tell Marcos the secret of the mirror.

Later, Marcos and company find out who Maritza truly was, and that he truly fell in love with Juliana. He then asks her to marry him.

6 months later, Juliana and Marcos are preparing for their wedding and Barbara decides to return after undergoing 4 surgeries abroad to stop being Maritza Ferrer. Before returning, he calls Romero and sends him to kill Juliana, but he fails and shoots Marcos. After the shot, Marcos is sterile and cannot have children, so he decides to break up with Juliana so that she can have what she wants most. Juan Tobías returns and decides to speak to Juliana, who believes that it was he who made Marcos change his mind. Barbara goes to the hospital and with Vanessa's identity, she cheats Luzmila and Juliana, and they take her to the neighborhood without knowing who she really is.

At Marcos and Juliana's wedding, Barbara threatens to shoot them both but is killed by Romero via poison, (who later commits suicide).

The show ends 3 years later, wherein they are the parents of a boy and a girl (Juliana was pregnant before the shooting and did not know it) and they live happily.

== Cast ==
- Paola Rey as Juliana Soler / Maritza Ferrer / Baritza de Mutti : Gabriel and Regina's daughter, Marcos' wife. Paola Rey also portrays Baritza which was Barbara using the Maritza persona and assuming to be her through the magic mirror.
- Juan Alfonso Baptista as Marcos Mutti; Gabriel's adopted son and Juliana's husband
- Gabriela Vergara as Barbara Montesinos de Mutti; Gabriel's ex-wife and primary antagonist
- Natasha Klauss as Luzmila Arrebatos; Juliana's best friend and Charlie's eventual love interest and later fiancée and stepmother to his son
- Paulo César Quevedo as Alberto Gutiérrez; Barbara's lover, secondary antagonist
- Rossana Fernández Maldonado as Xiomara Fuentes; Marcos' ex-girlfriend, secondary antagonist
- Andrés Felipe Martínez as Paco Tapia; Dance teacher and Juliana's godfather
- Kristina Lilley as Regina Soler; Juliana's mother
- Gloria Gómez as Mercedes Soler; Juliana's aunt
- Javier Gómez as Gabriel Mutti; Juliana's father
- Raul Gutierrez as Romero; Barbara's right-hand, secondary antagonist
- Sebastian Boscán as Pedro Baraja; Luzmila's ex-boyfriend and father to her children
- Pedro Moreno as Nino Arrebatos; A fellow dancer at the academy
- Alfredo Ahnert as Charlie; Marcos' best friend and Luzmila's eventual love interest and later fiancé and stepfather to her sons
- Natalia Bedoya as Ginger; Luzmila's dance rival and Nino's dance partner
- Xilena Aycardi as Vanessa/Barbara Montesinos (after surgery)
- Marcelo Buquet as Juan Tabias (Juliana Soler ex husband).
