= Paola Rey =

Colombian actress and model (born 1979)

- Rey in 2024
- Born: Paola Andrea Rey Arciniegas; December 19, 1979 (age 46); San Gil, Santander, Colombia
- Occupations: Actress; Model
- Years active: 1996-present
- Height: 1.63 m (5 ft 4 in)
- Spouse: Juan Carlos Vargas (m. 2010)
- Children: 2
- Website: www.paolareyactriz.com

Paola Andrea Rey Arciniegas (born December 19, 1979, in San Gil, Santander, Colombia) is a Colombian actress and model.

== Biography ==
Paola Andrea Rey Arciniegas was born on December 19, 1979, in San Gil, Santander, Colombia. She is the daughter of José Domingo Rey and Cecilia Arciniegas. Paola has two siblings – a sister, Alexandra Rey Arciniegas and a brother, José Alberto Rey Arciniegas. Initially, she was interested in pursuing Industrial engineering. However, she let go of her pursuit after being cast in a telenovela in 1996, with no previous acting experience.

== Personal life ==
On June 5, 2010, she married the Colombian actor Juan Carlos Vargas. In July 2013, she gave birth to the couple's first child - a boy, named Oliver Vargas Rey. In May 2018, she gave birth to a second son, called Leo Vargas Rey.

Rey is close friends with the Venezuelan actor, Juan Alfonso Baptista.

== Career ==
She has worked in a number of Colombian telenovelas, including La Baby Sister, Pasión de Gavilanes, and La mujer en el espejo.

She has appeared in several films, including Como el gato y el raton, which won awards in several international festivals, and The Private Archives of Pablo Escobar.

She also works as a model, appearing on the cover of the Fall 2005 edition of "Fuego", and has been the face of Neutrogena.

== Filmography ==
=== Television ===
Year	Title	Character	Channel	Notes
1996-1998	Fuego verde	Graciela	Canal 1 / Canal A	
1998	Sin límites	Camila		
1998-1999	Corazón prohibido	Paola Andrea	Canal A	185 episodes
1999-2000	¿Por qué diablos?	Jazmín "Jaz" Cordero	Canal 1	126 episodes
2000-2001	La Baby Sister	Fabiana Estrella Rivera Chitiva	Telemundo	160 episodes
2003–2022	Pasión de Gavilanes	Jimena Elizondo Acevedo	Telemundo / Caracol Televisión	
2004-2005	La mujer en el espejo	Juliana Soler / Maritza Ferrer / Bárbara Montesinos	Telemundo / Caracol Televisión	155 episodes
2006-2007	Amores de mercado	Lucía Savater Martínez de Leyra	Telemundo	123 episodes
2006-2007	Decisiones		Telemundo / Caracol Televisión	
2007-2008	Montecristo	Teresa Lezama / Venus Sáenz Cervantes / Cecilia Cervantes de Sáenz	Caracol Televisión	150 episodes
2009-2010	Las detectivas y el Víctor	María Isabel "Chabela" Rodríguez Gutiérrez	RCN Televisión	145 episodes
2012-2013	Pobres Rico	Mariela Siachoque	RCN Televisión	120 episodes
2015-2016	Sala de urgencias	Carolina Hernández	RCN Televisión	131 episodes
2019	The Mafia Dolls	Brenda Navarrete	Caracol Televisión / Netflix	118 episodes

=== Movies ===
Year	Movie	Character	Director
2002	Como el gato y el ratón	Giovanna Cristancho	Rodrigo Triana
2014	Espejos	Inga	César Manzano
2017	La Man Cave	Pao	Riccardo Gabrielli R.
2019	Sofía	Sofía	Famor Botero
