= Juan Alfonso Baptista =

Venezuelan-Colombian actor and model

- Born: Juan Alfonso Baptista Díaz; September 9, 1976 (age 49); Caracas, Venezuela
- Other names: Juan Alfonso Baptista 'Gato', Alfonso Baptista, Juan A. Baptista, El Gato
- Occupations: Actor, model
- Height: 1.80 m (5 ft 11 in)

Juan Alfonso Baptista Díaz (born 9 September 1976) is a Venezuelan-Colombian actor and model best known for his roles in Gata Salvaje, Pasión de Gavilanes and La Mujer En El Espejo.

== Biography ==
Juan Alfonso Baptista attended elementary school at Colegio Santo Tomás de Villanueva and his high school at Instituto Escuela Chaves. His interest in acting came after soccer. He was a member of the Venezuelan National Selection of Soccer when he was 13 years of age (minor leagues). In his acting career, he is best known for starring in telenovelas, including the worldwide success, Pasión de gavilanes.

He holds a bachelor's degree in odontology from Universidad Santa María and a degree in advertising from Instituto Nuevas Profesiones. He has worked as a photographer in New York for the Diane Von Fürstenberg fashion company. In 2007, he moved to L.A. and signed a contract with St. Steven.

== Filmography ==
=== Film roles ===
Year	Title	Role	Notes
2011	Sexo, mentiras y muertos	Gerardo	
2011	La cara oculta	Ramírez	
2011	The Snitch Cartel	Gustavo	Sequel to the telenovela
2016	Pablo	Daniel	
2017	De regreso al colegio	Braulio	

=== Television roles ===
Year	Title	Role	Notes
1997	A todo corazón	Elías "El Gato" Mujíca	
1999	Enamorada	Ricky Contreras	
2000	Hechizo de amor	René Castro	
2001	Como en el cine	Charlie	
2002–2003	Gata Salvaje	Bruno Villalta	
2003–present	Pasión de Gavilanes	Óscar Reyes	
2004-2005	La mujer en el espejo	Marcos Mutti	
2005	Aquí no hay quien viva	Juan Alfonso	Episode: "Érase una sequía"
2007	La marca del deseo	Luis Eduardo	
2008	Tiempo final	Unknown role	Episode: "Pito final"
2009	Sin tetas no hay paraíso	Guillermo Mejía	15 episodes
2009–2014	El Capo	Pitre	4 episodes
2011	Sacrificio de mujer	Luis Francisco Vilarte	
2011	La Teacher de Inglés	Luis Fernando Caicedo	
2011	A corazón abierto	Hugo	
2012	Lynch	Eduardo Muñoz	4 episodes
2013	Los Rey	Pedro Luis Malvido / Peluso	
2013	La Madame	Felipe Baena	Episode: "Sandra la virgen"
2013	Mentiras perfectas	Felipe	Episode: "Castigos perfectos"
2015	Celia	Ramón Cabrera	
2017	Pambelé	Ezequiel Mercado	
2017–2018	Sin senos sí hay paraíso	Martín Cruz	Main role (season 2); 35 episodes
2020	La venganza de Analía	Marc Salinas	English title: Her Mother's Killer
