= Tracy Howe =

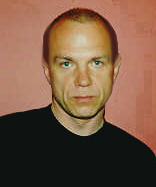
- Tracy Howe; From Rational Youth in 2013.

Background information
- Born: Tracy Marlowe Howe; February 16, 1952 (age 74)
- Origin: Toronto, Ontario, Canada
- Genres: Synthpop, electronica, punk rock
- Occupations: Singer, songwriter, musician
- Instruments: Vocals, keyboards, guitar, drums
- Years active: 1975–1986 1997-2002 2009-present
- Labels: YUL Records; Capitol Records; Energy Rekords; Vinyl On Demand; Artoffact Records; Donkeyland Records
- Website: rationalyouth.bandcamp.com

Tracy Howe (born 16 February 1952) is a Canadian musician, singer and songwriter with the band Rational Youth, and previously The Normals and Heaven Seventeen. Howe was a member of Rational Youth from 1981 to 1986 and 1997 to 2002 and 2009–2021.

== Early life ==
Tracy Howe was born in Toronto, Ontario, Canada. His father, John Howe, was a film producer and his mother, Mary Sheppard, was a stage actress. Soon after his birth in 1952, Tracy and his family moved to London, England. In 1956, when Tracy was 4 they moved to Ottawa, Canada. In 1957, the family moved to Ville St-Laurent, Quebec, and in 1959 moved again to Pointe-Claire, Quebec, where Tracy lived until he left home in 1970 at age 18.

Tracy has been playing music in bands since he was 15. Howe's professional music career began in 1975 as a singer and drummer for Montreal punk band The Normals. Howe was later a drummer and singer in Montreal band Heaven Seventeen (not to be confused with England's Heaven 17), considered to be one of the first punk bands to use synthesizers. One of Heaven Seventeen's keyboard players was Ivan Doroschuk, who later formed Men Without Hats. Howe also later joined Men Without Hats, as a guitarist, prior to forming Rational Youth with Bill Vorn.

== Rational Youth ==
Rational Youth was in existence from its formation in 1981 until 1986, with a hiatus between 1986 and 1997, and another in the early 2000s, and thence from 2014 until 2021. During this latter period the band toured in Europe, Latin America, and Canada, and released the album Future Past Tense in 2016. In 2021, on the 40th anniversary of its founding, Rational Youth released the EP Wavelength.

== Personal life ==
Tracy is married to Gaenor Howe, who is also a member of Rational Youth. They adopted a 17 year old girl named Jennifer Dawn Hamilton in 2005. During adoption, her name was changed to Polyhymnia Victoria Howe. They became estranged from their adopted daughter in early 2007.

== Discography ==
=== Album (with The Normals) ===
- Now Music Now (1975–1978) (2012)

=== Albums (with Rational Youth) ===
==== Studio albums ====
- Cold War Night Life (1982)
- Rational Youth (EP) (1983)
- Heredity (1985)
- To the Goddess Electricity (1999)
- Future Past Tense (2016)

==== Live album ====
- Live 1983 (2013)

==== Compilations ====
- Total Rational! (unauthorised Dutch compilation, 1994)
- All Our Saturdays (1981–1986) (compilation, 1999)
- Early Singles (CD box, 2000)
- The 20th Anniversary Collection (compilation, 2001)
- Magic Box (rarities and demos compilation, 2013)
- Recordings 1981-84 (5-LP vinyl box set, 2014)

=== Singles ===
- "I Want to See the Light/Coboloid Race" (12", 1981)
- "Cité Phosphore" (7", 1982)
- "City of Night" (12", 1982)
- "Saturdays in Silesia" (7"/12", 1982)
- "In Your Eyes" (7"/12", 1983)
- "Dancing on the Berlin Wall" (Dutch 12", 1984; unauthorised extended edit)
- "No More and No Less" (7"/12", 1985) - hit No. 87 on the RPM Canadian charts
- "Call Me" (7"/12", 1985) - hit No. 89 on the RPM Canadian charts
- "Bang On" (7"/12", 1985) - hit No. 91 in the RPM Canadian charts
- "Malade" (7", 1985)
- 3 Remixes For The New Cold War (EP, 1998)
- "Everything Is Vapour/Money And Blood" (CD single, 1999)
- "Dancing On The Berlin Wall" (CD single, 2010)
- "City Of Night"/"Cite Phosphore" (CD single, 2011)
- "Coboloid Race"/"I Want To See The Light" (30th Anniversary Edition) (CD single, 2011)
- Rational Youth & Psyche: "Thunderstruck" (7" single, 2014)
