= Early Singles (Rational Youth album) =

Box set by Rational Youth
- Released: 21 July 2000
- Recorded: 1981–1998
- Length: 80:49
- Label: October Records
- Producers: Rational Youth, Pyer Desrocher, Pat Deserio

Rational Youth chronology
To The Goddess Electricity (1999)	Early Singles (2000)	The 20th Anniversary Collection (2001)

Early Singles (which is the title listed on the record label's web site; also called Singles Box and Rational Youth) is a CD box with re-issues of Rational Youth's pre-Heredity singles and the eponymous EP. The box was released by Swedish label October Records in a limited edition of 600 copies.

The box contains the following CDs, in chronological order:

- "I Want To See The Light/Coboloid Race" (one bonus track)
- "Saturdays in Silesia" (one bonus track)
- "City Of Night"
- "In Your Eyes" (one bonus track)
- Rational Youth EP (one bonus track)

Professional ratings
Review scores
Source	Rating
AllMusic	4.5/5 stars

== Track listing ==
All tracks by Tracy Howe & Bill Vorn except where noted.

Rational Youth:

1. "In Your Eyes" (Howe, Kevin Komoda) – 2:53
2. "Just A Sound In The Night" – 3:48
3. "Latin Lovers (Howe, Komoda) – 3:54
4. "Holiday In Bangkok" (Howe) – 5:28
5. "The Man In Grey" (Howe) – 3:24
6. "Holiday In Bangkok (live in Helsingborg 1998)" – 5:09 [bonus track]

"I Want To See The Light/Coboloid Race":

1. "Coboloid Race" – 5:18
2. "I Want To See The Light" – 3:42
3. "Coboloid Race (Bill Vorn remix)" – 6:12 [bonus track]

"City Of Night":

1. "City Of Night (danse mix)" – 7:09
2. "Powerzone" – 3:38
3. "Cité Phosphore" – 4:00

"Saturdays in Silesia":

1. "Saturdays in Silesia (extended version)" – 7:14
2. "Pile Ou Face" – 2:37
3. "Saturdays in Silesia (Dee Long remix)" – 4:05 [bonus track]

"In Your Eyes":

1. "In Your Eyes (extended)" (Howe, Komoda) – 5:24
2. "Hot Streets" (Duran, Howe, Komoda) – 3:04 [English version of "Pile Ou Face"]
3. "I've Got A Sister In The Navy" (Howe) – 3:50 [previously unreleased version, bonus track]

== Personnel ==
- Tracy Howe – vocals, synthesizers
- Bill Vorn – synthesizers, vocoder, programming
- Mario Spezza – synthesizers
- Kevin Akira Komoda – keyboards
- Angel Calvo – drums, percussion
- Denis Duran – bass guitar
- Jean-Claude Cutz – synthesizer
- Dave Rout – synthesizer
