= Campuzano =

Campuzano is a surname. Notable people with the surname include:

- Ashley Campuzano (born 1992), American actress
- Carmen Campuzano (born 1970), Mexican actress and model
- Daniela Campuzano (born 1986), Mexican mountain biker
- Juan Carlos Campuzano (born 1949), American physicist
- Jorman Campuzano (born 1996), Colombian football player
- Nico Campuzano (born 1998), Spanish football player
- Rómulo Campuzano (born 1957), Mexican politician
- Rosa Campuzano (1796–1851), Ecuadorian activist
- Will Campuzano (born 1986), Mexican-American mixed martial artist

== See also ==
- Campusano
