= Total Rational! =

Compilation album by Rational Youth
- Released: 1994
- Recorded: 1981–82
- Genre: Synthpop
- Label: Rams Horn
- Producer: Pat Deserio

Rational Youth chronology
Malade (1985)	Total Rational! (1994)	All Our Saturdays (1981–1986) (1996)

Total Rational! is a Rational Youth compilation album, released (without authorisation from the band) by the Dutch label Rams Horn, who had previously released the Cold War Night Life album and some singles on license from YUL records.

Total Rational! contains the entire Cold War Night Life album, single tracks and extended mixes, including the unauthorised extended remix of "Dancing On The Berlin Wall"..

== Track listing ==
1. "Saturdays in Silesia" - 4:03
2. "Close to Nature" - 4:35
3. "Ring the Bells" - 5:10
4. "Power Zone" - 3:36
5. "Dancing on the Berlin Wall" - 4:33
6. "Beware the Fly" - 4:03
7. "City of Night" - 3:48
8. "Just a Sound in the Night" - 4:49
9. "Pile ou Face" - 5:37
10. "Le Meilleur des Mondes" - 2:54
11. "Cite Phosphore" - 4:00
12. "Saturdays in Silesia (extended version)" - 7:14
13. "Dancing on the Berlin Wall [Dutch 1984 extended edit]" - 5:43
14. "City of Night (danse mix)" - 7:08

== Personnel ==
- Tracy Howe - vocals, synthesizers
- Bill Vorn - synthesizers, programming, vocoder
- Kevin Komoda - synthesizers
