= Latin Lover =

Latin Lover(s) may refer to:

- Latin lover, a stereotypical stock character, part of the Hollywood star system

== Film, television and radio ==
- Latin Lovers (1953 film), an American musical comedy film
- Latin Lovers (1965 film), an Italian comedy film
- Latin Lover (film), a 2015 Italian comedy-drama film
- Latin Lover (TV series), a 2001–2002 telenovela
- The Latin Lover, a Vatican Radio show hosted by Reginald Foster

== Music ==
- Latin Lovers, a duo comprising DJ Chus and Beto Cerutti

=== Albums ===
- Latin Lover (album), by Gianna Nannini, or the title song, 1982
- Latin Lovers (2014 album), a Latin music compilation by various artists
- Latin Lovers, by Giovanni Marradi, 1999

=== Songs ===
- "Latin Lover", by Hello Sailor from Hello Sailor, 1977
- "Latin Lovers", by Lee Ritenour from Festival, 1988
- "Latin Lovers", by Monika Kruse, 2003
- "Latin Lovers", by Rational Youth from Rational Youth, 1983

== People ==
- Rudolph Valentino (1895–1926), Italian actor
- Latin Lover (wrestler) (Victor Ruiz) (born 1967), Mexican professional wrestler
