= Latin Lover (TV series) =

- Country of origin: Peru
- Original languages: Spanish; English (dubbed)
- No. of episodes: 62

Production
- Running time: 60 minutes

Original release
- Network: Playboy TV Latin America (regionwide, uncut version); Red Global (Peru, edited version)
- Release: 2001 – 2002

Latin Lover is a joint telenovela production between Venevisión (Venezuela), Iguana Producciones (Peru), and Playboy Entertainment Group (United States). It centers around the production of a fictional telenovela (a novela-within-the-novela, also translated as "Latin Lover"), and follows the lives (mainly the sex lives) of the actors and production staff involved in the show, as well as other tangential characters. The show features a large main cast of at least 23 credited performers. The series had two versions, an erotic version broadcast by Playboy TV and a second version adapted to over-the-air TV standards.

Each episode features a number of softcore pornographic and simulated sexy scenes, commonly including full frontal and rear nudity, though rarely showing either male or female genitalia.

As of July 6, 2008, Latin Lover is broadcast in Canada by Telelatino, dubbed into English. A new series called Latin Lover 2: Beauty & Ambition (Bellas y ambiciosas) premiered on Telelatino Network in Spring 2009. The new series is adapted from Malicia, from scripts produced by Iguana Producciones, Peruvian partner of the series, for Frecuencia Latina.

== Premise ==
The plot generally revolves around the character Rafael Carballo, the director of the "Latin Lover" novela. Rafael is portrayed as an attractive man whom women often find difficult to resist. He is often equally incapable of declining the sexual advances of the scheming, seductive women involved in the novela and the production company behind it. This often gets him into trouble; particularly with his longtime girlfriend Viviana - daughter of Mariana and Samuel Ventura Moreira. Samuel is the powerful owner of Canal Internacional, which produces the novela. Samuel also has an affair with Bárbara - a seductress who is secretly after Samuel's position, and devises many plots to further that goal.

A major story arc early in the series is Rafael's search for the actress that will star in the novela. Several actresses fight over the role, including Renata and Valeria. However, an unexpected candidate emerges in Claudia Fuentes, a waitress whose aunt prepares lunch at the novela's studio. Claudia does not even want the job; she is in love with Omar, a mechanic, but finds that he is too controlling for her.

After a video of Rafael sleeping with Renata is leaked to the press, Viviana leaves him, and he is forced to resign from the novela. Viviana decides to begin working for the station herself, in preparation for taking over from her father. Bárbara is also reinstated at Canal, and after offering the job to Silvana, who threatens to organize a strike if Rafael isn't reinstated, she decides to direct the novela herself. However, after Bárbara is caught sleeping with an actor on the set, Viviana puts her personal problems aside and suggests her father rehire Rafael.

Meanwhile, Samuel ends his affair with Bárbara after he meets Débora Bacigallupo - a young actress whose controlling mother forces her to seduce Samuel in order to gain a role in the novela. Samuel falls in love with her and pursues her affections; but she instead has feelings for Fabian, a stuntman-turned-actor. An unknown assailant begins stalking, kidnapping, and raping the novela's actresses.

== Cast ==
Actor	Role	Character Description
Riccardo Dalmacci	Samuel Ventura Moreira	Owner of Canal Internacional
Andrea Montenegro	Claudia Fuentes	Actress (plays Azucena) in Latin Lover novela
Juan Carlos Salazar	Rafael Carballo	Director of Latin Lover novela
Paola Martínez	Bárbara Mongrut	Head of production for Canal Internacional
Fernando Gaviria	Gabriel	Film set handyman
Natalia Villaveces	Débora Bacigalupo	Actress (plays Tanya) in Latin Lover novela
Mónica Domínguez	Jacqueline Robinson	Debora's mother
Milene Vásquez	Annie	Wardrobe coordinator for Latin Lover novela
Eleana Carrión	Elise	Makeup artist for Latin Lover novela
Cecilia Brozovich	Renata	Actress (plays Deliah) in Latin Lover novela
Rebecca Scribens	Silvana	Production staff of Latin Lover novela
Janet Murazzi		
Danitza García	Marta	Claudia's aunt
Enrique Villa	Aldo	Cameraman for Latin Lover novela
Jean Pierre Vismara	Omar	Mechanic and Claudia's on/off boyfriend
Martin Flor	Tony	Actor in Latin Lover novela
Omar Avila	Fabián	Stuntman/actor (plays Bernie) in Latin Lover novela
Jorge Guzmán		
Paola Marijuan	Cecilia	Reporter
Liliana Mas	Viviana	Daughter of Mariana and Samuel, girlfriend/fiancé of Rafael
Silvia Caballero	Valeria Ravilla	Actress (plays Laura) in Latin Lover novela
Malu Costa	Lalita	Actress in Latin Lover novela
Aaron Rowan		
Fernando Rolaries		
Fabiana Jenichen	Lucinda	Samuel's secretary
Characters for whom it is unknown which actor portrays them
	Mariana	Wife of Samuel and mother of Viviana
	David	An associate of Samuel at Canal Internacional
	Fiorella	Production staff of Latin Lover novela
	Sergio	Security/bodyguard

== Production ==
The project was derived from a commercial agreement signed in July 2000 between Playboy and Venevisión International for the distribution of Playboy brand content on Ibero-American open television channels, with cuts to adapt them to open TV standards, taking advantage of the potential of the schedules. nights of these television stations. This first attempt brought intrigue dramas, chosen by Luis Villanueva's criteria, which were set in exotic places. In January 2001, the two parties announced the production of Latin Lover, which would continue with the equal policy of releasing both versions (erotic version for Playboy and version for open TV) that was agreed upon the previous year. To promote the project, representatives of the brand (Playboy bunnies and channel executives) were at the 2001 NATPE at the Venevisión International stand, whose main scope was the expansion of the prime time concept that would bring benefits to advertisers and channels. In March, it was confirmed that Luis Llosa was appointed as director, with its production being completed in September.

The novel was filmed in Lima due to location rental costs. The production included English and American technicians as well as technical services from Iguana Producciones. There was also a strong presence of Peruvian actors. In addition, there was a scandal regarding the non-renewal of Playboy TV on Peruvian cable companies, which was going to expire in October 2001.

Latin Lover suffered from low audiometric ratings in its run on Red Global in 2002, as consequence Playboy announced that it was going to stop producing other soap operas in Peru as a consequence. The over-the-air TV version generated adverse criticism from the press, pointing out that the script had no continuity and was only limited to sex scenes. Before this scandal, it was speculated that Playboy was not going to make more productions in Peru, opting for Chile or Argentina for that purpose.

During its filming, one of the actresses, Silvia Caballero, denounced the illegal use of some images from the series in other programs, being a violation of the contract signed with Playboy which ruled that such scenes were exclusive to the premium channel. Other actresses also criticized the inappropriate use of the scenes.

The Portuguese network SIC broadcast the over-the-air TV version subtitled in Portuguese, translated it as Amante Latino and was broadcast on Fridays in the early hours of the morning, premiering on February 1, 2002. When it ended in April of that year, it was replaced by a new season of NYPD Blue.
