= Stephen Huss =

Stephen Huss is the name of:

- Stephen Huss (musician) (1967–2015), founder of the duo Psyche
- Stephen Huss (tennis) (born 1975), Australian professional tennis player
