= East Los High =

2010s American teen drama TV series

- Genre: Teen drama
- Created by: Carlos Portugal; Kathleen Bedoya
- Written by: Carlos Portugal
- Directed by: Carlos Portugal; Carlos Reza; Katie Elmore Mota; Efrain Cortes
- Starring: Vannessa Vasquez; Gabriel Chavarria; Danielle Vega; Alexandra Rodriguez; Carlito Olivero; J. D. Pardo
- Opening theme: "SO WHAT!" by Sanchia
- Composer: Juan Carlos Rodriguez
- Country of origin: United States
- Original languages: English; Spanish
- No. of seasons: 4
- No. of episodes: 61

Production
- Executive producers: Katie Elmore Mota; Carlos Portugal; Mauricio Mota; Kathleen Bedoya; Mark Warshaw
- Producers: Katie Elmore Mota; Kathy Le Backes; Mariela Ramos Oquendo; Robin Henry; Lauren Robinson; Laurence P Duke; Danielle Vega; Gabriel Chavarria
- Production location: East Los Angeles, California
- Editor: Donna Mathewson
- Running time: 22–24 minutes
- Production companies: Wise Entertainment; Population Media Center; Into Action Films; Hulu Originals

Original release
- Network: Hulu
- Release: June 3, 2013 – December 1, 2017

East Los High is a teen drama television series that revolves around the lives of a group of teens navigating their final years at a fictional high school in East LA. Created, written, and produced by Wise Entertainment, the series is Hulu's first and only series with an all Latino cast and crew and is predominantly filmed in East Los Angeles. The producers of the show work closely with numerous public health organizations to incorporate information within the storylines that encourage young Latinos to make healthy life choices.

On May 19, 2017, it was announced that East Los High would not be renewed for a fifth season. Hulu instead ordered an hour and half long series finale, which aired on December 1, 2017.

== Series synopsis ==
=== Season 1 ===
The series follows two teenage cousins, Jessie, a studious virgin, and Maya, a troubled runaway, who fall in love with Jacob, a popular football player. Maya and Jessie are forced to make real-life decisions as a result of this love triangle about social pressure, drugs, pregnancy, betrayal, and sex that will determine which of them will get the boy and have an impact on their lives for the rest of their lives. Ceci and Vanessa, two popular student and school bullies who make it their mission to intimidate any girls at East Los, but their choice in sexual partners cause them to face life-changing repercussions.

=== Season 2 ===
When Ceci and Jacob return to East Los High School as coaches, the drama continues. A new generation of students navigate relationships in the hallways of East Los High, leading to a turn of events during the school year.

=== Season 3 ===
The second semester of East Los High is in session, but the trouble continues to brew outside the halls of the inner city school as Camilla struggles with some inner demons as someone from her past returns to LA. Gina begins to grow closer with Eddie, a student with a difficult home life. While adding new members to "Bomb Squad," Ceci's troubles at home become more dangerous. Diego's betrayal continues to affect Tiffany. A once-in-a-lifetime opportunity tests the depth of Maya and Jacob's love. Both unfamiliar and new people show up and become involved in the game.

=== Season 4 ===
Summer has begun for East Los High. Competition on and off the dance floor increases as lies, secrets, betrayals, and sexting affect the students.

=== Season 5 ===
10 months after the eventful summer, another school year has come to an end for Ceci and the remaining seniors of the bomb squad. However, it might be their last time together as life changing opportunities are presented to them that could have them not only leaving high school, but East Los altogether.

== Cast and characters ==
=== Main ===
- Vannessa Vasquez as Camila Barrios
- Danielle Vega as Ceci Camayo
- Alexandra Rodriguez as Gina Barrios
- Gabriel Chavarria as Jacob Aguilar
- Carlito Olivero as Eddie Ramirez
- J. D. Pardo as Jesus
- Cinthya Carmona as Brandie
- Ade Chike Torbert as Caleb Summers
- Byron Martinez as Luis
- Ray Diaz as Nicolas Reyes
- Janine Larina as Jessie Martinez (season 1)
- Vivian Lamolli as Filiberta "Fili" Rodriguez
- Rick Mancia as Diego Campos (season 2)
- Gillbert Saldivar as Santi
- Oskar Rodrigues as Omar
- Alicia Sixtos as Maya Martinez (season 1; recurring season 2–4)
- Tracy Perez as Vanessa De La Cruz (season 1; recurring season 2–4)
- Andrea Sixtos as Jocelyn Reyes (season 2–3; recurring season 4)
- Ashley Campuzano as Tiffany Ramos (season 3; recurring season 4)

=== Recurring ===
- Ser Anzoategui as Daysi Cantu
- Noemi Gonzalez as Soli Gomez
- Hector David Jr. as Cristian Camacho
- Monica Guzman as Lupe Martinez
- Catalina Rodriguez as Paulina Martinez
- Jossara Jinaro as Reina Martinez
- Richard Azurdia as Ramon
- Jeremy Chavarria as Zac Bustamante
- Chachi Gonzales as Jasmine
- Robert Paul Taylor as Remy
- Catherine Lazo as Ms. Alvarez
- Miguel Najara as José Reyes
- Gabrielle Walsh as Sofia
- Jes Meza as Lorena Barrios Aguilar
- Ruben Garfias as Hernan Aguilar
- Jorge Diaz as Paulie
- Vivis Colombetti as Rosario Reyes

=== Guest stars ===
- Catalina Sandino Moreno as Carmen
- Christina Milian as Lillian
- Prince Royce as Vincent
- Stephen "tWitch" Boss as himself
- Vázquez Sounds as themselves
- Chuey Martinez as himself
- John DeLuca as Jeremy

== Episodes ==
=== Series overview ===
| Season | Episodes | Originally released | |
| Season | Episodes | First released | Last released |
|---|---|---|---|
| 1 | 24 | June 3, 2013 | July 3, 2013 |
| 2 | 12 | July 9, 2014 | |
| 3 | 12 | July 15, 2015 | |
| 4 | 12 | July 15, 2016 | |
| Series Finale | | December 1, 2017 | |

=== Season 1 (2013) ===
| No. overall | No. in season | Title | Directed by | Written by | Original release date |
|---|---|---|---|---|---|
| 1 | 1 | "This Year's Winter King & Queen" | Carlos Portugal | Carlos Portugal, Evangeline Ordaz, Cristobal Franco, Sasha Stroman Malaret, Mary Feuer, Zoila A. Galeano, Shelley Acosta Smith, & Joaquin F. Palma | June 3, 2013 |
Winter Formal King and Queen are revealed, after the Winter Formal couple finishes dancing, Soli makes Jessie asks Jacob to dance. They share a tender moment. While dancing, Jessie's phone is stolen by an unknown person. The mystery thief uses the phone to catch a viral video of Vanessa having sex in a parked car.
| 2 | 2 | "The Patron Saint of Lost Causes" | Carlos Portugal | Carlos Portugal, Evangeline Ordaz, Cristobal Franco, Sasha Stroman Malaret, Mary Feuer, Zoila A. Galeano, Shelley Acosta Smith, & Joaquin F. Palma | June 3, 2013 |
Now that she's dating Jacob, Jessie is tempted to give up her membership to the “Virgin's Club” while Maya runs into trouble when she starts dealing stolen drugs. Vanessa finds out who shot her sex tape
| 3 | 3 | "Welcome to the Bomb Squad" | Carlos Portugal | Carlos Portugal, Evangeline Ordaz, Cristobal Franco, Sasha Stroman Malaret, Mary Feuer, Zoila A. Galeano, Shelley Acosta Smith, & Joaquin F. Palma | June 4, 2013 |
After a drug-related shooting, Maya finds herself on the run again. At the dance team tryouts, it is “Jessie vs. Vanessa”. The identity of the person who shot Vanessa's sex tape is revealed
| 4 | 4 | "Meet the New Busboy" | Carlos Portugal | Carlos Portugal, Evangeline Ordaz, Cristobal Franco, Sasha Stroman Malaret, Mary Feuer, Zoila A. Galeano, Shelley Acosta Smith, & Joaquin F. Palma | June 5, 2013 |
Jessie's romance with Jacob heats up, testing her willpower. Maya tries to clean up her act but trouble still follows her at East Los High and on the street. Vanessa announces a mandatory “initiation” party at her house.
| 5 | 5 | "The Initiation" | Carlos Portugal | Carlos Portugal, Evangeline Ordaz, Cristobal Franco, Sasha Stroman Malaret, Mary Feuer, Zoila A. Galeano, Shelley Acosta Smith, & Joaquin F. Palma | June 6, 2013 |
Jessie unleashes her wild side when she meets Cristian, a hot dancer, at Vanessa's house party. Rejected by Jacob, Vanessa plots against him while Maya receives a call from the dead.
| 6 | 6 | "Bang the Virgin" | Carlos Portugal | Carlos Portugal, Evangeline Ordaz, Cristobal Franco, Sasha Stroman Malaret, Mary Feuer, Zoila A. Galeano, Shelley Acosta Smith, & Joaquin F. Palma | June 7, 2013 |
Jacob and Maya get to know each other while working at his father's taquería. Both Jessie and Ceci receive news that rock their worlds and Vanessa makes a risky decision in the name of revenge.
| 7 | 7 | "Did You Just Become My Boss" | Carlos Portugal | Carlos Portugal, Evangeline Ordaz, Cristobal Franco, Sasha Stroman Malaret, Mary Feuer, Zoila A. Galeano, Shelley Acosta Smith, & Joaquin F. Palma | June 10, 2013 |
Jessie's private dance lessons with Cristian are so sexy, she forgets about all her troubles at home. Maya's healthy Mexican dishes inspire Jacob to revamp his father's struggling taquería. The Martinez home gets a beautiful surprise visitor.
| 8 | 8 | "Maya's Secret Recipes" | Carlos Portugal | Carlos Portugal, Evangeline Ordaz, Cristobal Franco, Sasha Stroman Malaret, Mary Feuer, Zoila A. Galeano, Shelley Acosta Smith, & Joaquin F. Palma | June 11, 2013 |
Maya and Jacob bond over the makeover of the taquería but Maya doesn't realize that Ramon is closing in on her. Jessie gets more “privates” with Cristian while Ceci suspects she's being poisoned by Abe's evil mom.
| 9 | 9 | "Some Guys Will Screw Anything" | Carlos Portugal | Carlos Portugal, Evangeline Ordaz, Cristobal Franco, Sasha Stroman Malaret, Mary Feuer, Zoila A. Galeano, Shelley Acosta Smith, & Joaquin F. Palma | June 12, 2013 |
“Dance Five” comes to East Los High! As Jessie preps for the big audition, her bond with Cristian grows stronger – on and off the dance floor. Maya's fashion makeover steals Jacob's attention while Ceci gets a reality check on Abe and her future.
| 10 | 10 | "Why Did I Have To Get Pregnant?" | Carlos Portugal | Carlos Portugal, Evangeline Ordaz, Cristobal Franco, Sasha Stroman Malaret, Mary Feuer, Zoila A. Galeano, Shelley Acosta Smith, & Joaquin F. Palma | June 13, 2013 |
Maya fights off her attraction for Jacob. Vanessa pressures Cristian to seal the deal with Jessie, and Ceci is in turmoil over her pregnancy. Meanwhile, Maya's dangerous past finally catches up with her.
| 11 | 11 | "We Shouldn't Be Doing This" | Carlos Portugal | Carlos Portugal, Evangeline Ordaz, Cristobal Franco, Sasha Stroman Malaret, Mary Feuer, Zoila A. Galeano, Shelley Acosta Smith, & Joaquin F. Palma | June 14, 2013 |
During one unforgettable night of romance, seduction and betrayal, Maya and Jessie are tempted to surrender to their true passions. Ceci continues to weigh her options.
| 12 | 12 | "I'm Gonna Give Him What He Wants" | Carlos Portugal | Carlos Portugal, Evangeline Ordaz, Cristobal Franco, Sasha Stroman Malaret, Mary Feuer, Zoila A. Galeano, Shelley Acosta Smith, & Joaquin F. Palma | June 17, 2013 |
Jessie transforms into a sexy vixen to get what she wants. Maya decides whether she should follow her heart or do right by her family. Cristian blackmails Vanessa and Ceci is on the streets again.
| 13 | 13 | "One Month Later" | Carlos Portugal | Carlos Portugal, Evangeline Ordaz, Cristobal Franco, Sasha Stroman Malaret, Mary Feuer, Zoila A. Galeano, Shelley Acosta Smith, & Joaquin F. Palma | June 18, 2013 |
The Bomb Squad performs on “Dance Five”! Jacob and Maya's success with the taquería leaves them eager to explore one another. Jessie's mom discovers her daughter's secret.
| 14 | 14 | "Damn! Why Didn't We Wait?" | Carlos Portugal | Carlos Portugal, Evangeline Ordaz, Cristobal Franco, Sasha Stroman Malaret, Mary Feuer, Zoila A. Galeano, Shelley Acosta Smith, & Joaquin F. Palma | June 19, 2013 |
Jacob gets a big surprise. Jessie's ailing mom asks Jacob to make her a promise he can't break. Maya's torn between family and love.
| 15 | 15 | "I Don't Think I Can Do This" | Carlos Portugal | Carlos Portugal, Evangeline Ordaz, Cristobal Franco, Sasha Stroman Malaret, Mary Feuer, Zoila A. Galeano, Shelley Acosta Smith, & Joaquin F. Palma | June 20, 2013 |
A wedding announcement at East Los High opens the doors to gossip, excitement and high drama. Maya meets up with a former “customer” and goes back to her old ways.
| 16 | 16 | "She Dumped You. Move On!" | Carlos Portugal | Carlos Portugal, Evangeline Ordaz, Cristobal Franco, Sasha Stroman Malaret, Mary Feuer, Zoila A. Galeano, Shelley Acosta Smith, & Joaquin F. Palma | June 21, 2013 |
It is senior prom time at East Los High! Jacob struggles to forget Maya while she pushes her limits as a stripper on and off the stage in Hollywood. Ceci settles into the reality of having a baby.
| 17 | 17 | "I Think She's Dead" | Carlos Portugal | Carlos Portugal, Evangeline Ordaz, Cristobal Franco, Sasha Stroman Malaret, Mary Feuer, Zoila A. Galeano, Shelley Acosta Smith, & Joaquin F. Palma | June 24, 2013 |
Jacob discovers where Maya's working and cannot believe his eyes. He tries to bring her back to East LA but it might be too late for Maya. Jessie befriends Father Rodolfo, a handsome priest, who has a mysterious connection to her family's past.
| 18 | 18 | "The Heart Always Knows" | Carlos Portugal | Carlos Portugal, Evangeline Ordaz, Cristobal Franco, Sasha Stroman Malaret, Mary Feuer, Zoila A. Galeano, Shelley Acosta Smith, & Joaquin F. Palma | June 25, 2013 |
Too much drinking, drugging and stripping finally catch up with Maya. Ceci tries to let go of her baby daddy and Jessie is faced with a great loss.
| 19 | 19 | "She's My Mother" | Carlos Portugal | Carlos Portugal, Evangeline Ordaz, Cristobal Franco, Sasha Stroman Malaret, Mary Feuer, Zoila A. Galeano, Shelley Acosta Smith, & Joaquin F. Palma | June 26, 2013 |
A funeral in East LA brings with it much intrigue, an unexpected confession and a surprise visit from a sexy relative. Maya and Jacob meet again and Jessie asks Maya for a very big favor.
| 20 | 20 | "She Swallowed the Worm" | Carlos Portugal | Carlos Portugal, Evangeline Ordaz, Cristobal Franco, Sasha Stroman Malaret, Mary Feuer, Zoila A. Galeano, Shelley Acosta Smith, & Joaquin F. Palma | June 27, 2013 |
Maya finally finds out who her father is. Ceci goes into labor at Jessie's house and there is no help in sight.
| 21 | 21 | "In Blood or Money" | Carlos Portugal | Carlos Portugal, Evangeline Ordaz, Cristobal Franco, Sasha Stroman Malaret, Mary Feuer, Zoila A. Galeano, Shelley Acosta Smith, & Joaquin F. Palma | June 28, 2013 |
Maya goes in search of her father while Jessie makes plans for her future. Vanessa feels the heat at the Dance Five finals and has to face a difficult truth.
| 22 | 22 | "Your Time Is Up" | Carlos Portugal | Carlos Portugal, Evangeline Ordaz, Cristobal Franco, Sasha Stroman Malaret, Mary Feuer, Zoila A. Galeano, Shelley Acosta Smith, & Joaquin F. Palma | July 1, 2013 |
East Los High students get ready for a wedding they will never forget. Maya and Reina plan their next move but do not realize their lives are in danger.
| 23 | 23 | "Good Girls Don't" | Carlos Portugal | Carlos Portugal, Evangeline Ordaz, Cristobal Franco, Sasha Stroman Malaret, Mary Feuer, Zoila A. Galeano, Shelley Acosta Smith, & Joaquin F. Palma | July 2, 2013 |
It is the big wedding day and the bride and groom get ready to walk down the aisle. Meanwhile, Ramon is still on the hunt for Maya and closer than ever to getting his revenge.
| 24 | 24 | "Build a Future Worthy of You" | Carlos Portugal | Carlos Portugal, Evangeline Ordaz, Cristobal Franco, Sasha Stroman Malaret, Mary Feuer, Zoila A. Galeano, Shelley Acosta Smith, & Joaquin F. Palma | July 3, 2013 |
Jessie needs to make a life-changing decision. Will there be a happy ending? Who will make it to graduation? Also, see where the East Los crew lands, one year later.

=== Season 2 (2014) ===
| No. overall | No. in season | Title | Directed by | Written by | Original release date |
|---|---|---|---|---|---|
| 25 | 1 | "New Dance Coach in da House" | Carlos Portugal | Charo Toledo | July 9, 2014 |
It is the start of a new school year with a whole new group of students and tension begins flaring after a popular student goes missing.
| 26 | 2 | "Best Friends with Benefits" | Carlos Portugal | Robin Henry | July 9, 2014 |
Ceci returns to coach the Bomb Squad, but the team's behavior tempers her excitement.
| 27 | 3 | "Meet Starfighter" | Carlos Portugal | Cris Franco & Luisa Leschin | July 9, 2014 |
As Homecoming night approaches, Camila must decide between two invitations. Fed up with the Bomb Squad's bad attitude, Ceci finds a way to put them in their place.
| 28 | 4 | "The Queen of Ugly the King of Fools" | Carlos Portugal | Silvia Cardenas Olivas | July 9, 2014 |
Homecoming has arrived. Gina debates giving up her virginity, while Camila and Jocelyn are presented with tempting situations.
| 29 | 5 | "Lesbians Out Loud" | Carlos Portugal | Sasha Stroman | July 9, 2014 |
Gina's plan to give up her "V" card takes an unexpected turn. Nicolas goes to great lengths to impress Camila.
| 30 | 6 | "Luchadoras" | Carlos Portugal | Evelina Fernandez & Luisa Leschin | July 9, 2014 |
Camila reverts to her old habits. Ceci puts the Bomb Squad through some rigorous training, just as they prepare to face an unexpected enemy.
| 31 | 7 | "Love Spells Are the Hardest" | Carlos Portugal | Sasha Stroman | July 9, 2014 |
The Bomb Squad dance team has an epic battle at the MacArthur Park competition. Pedro's bouts of jealousy grow more dangerous.
| 32 | 8 | "I Ain't No Victim" | Carlos Portugal | Silvia Olivas | July 9, 2014 |
Camila and Nicolas hit the Vegas strip. Jocelyn's life is turned upside down when her secret goes public.
| 33 | 9 | "Beauty Queens Don't Wear Trash" | Carlos Portugal | Charo Toledo | July 9, 2014 |
Tiffany's actions threaten to expose her affair with Diego. Camila goes into the recording studio with Nicolas.
| 34 | 10 | "Just the Tip" | Carlos Portugal | Robin Henry | July 9, 2014 |
Nicolas and Camila throw a blow out party at his boss Remy's loft. Ceci plots a risky escape.
| 35 | 11 | "It Was an Accident" | Carlos Portugal | Luisa Leschin | July 9, 2014 |
When another student goes missing, Camila and the rest of East Los High fear the worst.
| 36 | 12 | "The Monster's Back" | Carlos Portugal | Evelina Fernandez & Cris Franco | July 9, 2014 |
Camila and Jocelyn continue their search. The Bomb Squad prepares to compete for regional championship.

=== Season 3 (2015) ===
| No. overall | No. in season | Title | Directed by | Written by | Original release date |
|---|---|---|---|---|---|
| 37 | 1 | "La Virgen de East Los High" | Carlos Portugal | Davah Avena | July 15, 2015 |
Ceci has decided if she will say, "I Do"; Camila is left reeling when "the monster" returns; Nic is blackmailed after witnessing Remi's murder.
| 38 | 2 | "The B... is Back" | Carlos Portugal | Vivien Mejia | July 15, 2015 |
Ceci and Camila are forced to confront their biggest fears; the Bomb Squad dancers are thrown when coach Ceci is replaced by her enemy; Maya returns from Santa Fe to rock Jacob's world.
| 39 | 3 | "The End of an Era" | Carlos Portugal | Nancy De Los Santos | July 15, 2015 |
Camila speaks her truth about the abuse she suffered; Ceci suffers the wrath of angry dancers; Gina crashes Tiffany's pool party; Jacob and Maya pack their bags for Santa Fe
| 40 | 4 | "Sisters before Misters" | Carlos Portugal | Maria Escobedo | July 15, 2015 |
The Bomb Squad holds boys-only auditions; Ceci moves in with Isela's wicked abuela, Fabiola; Nic asks Camila for a dangerous favor.
| 41 | 5 | "From Witch to B..." | Carlos Portugal | Evelina Fernandez & Omaira Galarza | July 15, 2015 |
Camila starts dealing drugs with a difficult partner named Jesús; sexual tension escalates on the dance floor with the boys now on the team; Ceci adjusts to life with her new roommate and frenemy, Vanessa.
| 42 | 6 | "Valentine's Day" | Carlos Portugal | Charo Toledo | July 15, 2015 |
The co-ed Bomb Squad makes its debut with a sexy salsa number at the Valentine's Day pep rally; Gina crushes on Tiffany's boyfriend; Fili resorts to desperate sexual measures to get Santi's attention.
| 43 | 7 | "Scar Wars" | Carlos Reza | Maria Escobedo | July 15, 2015 |
Camila and Jesus find themselves trapped in a restaurant with a bag full of drugs; Ceci struggles to make a decision that could change her and Isela's lives; Fili, Tiffany and Gina discuss how far they are willing to go for love.
| 44 | 8 | "I'm Not Eating Mexican" | Carlos Reza | Nancy De Los Santos | July 15, 2015 |
the heat is on when Camila and the rest of the Bomb Squad is given a chance to work in a hip-hop music video; the Bomb Squad boys are pulled over by cops; Jesus finds out he's a moving target.
| 45 | 9 | "Road Trip" | Carlos Reza | Evelina Fernandez | July 15, 2015 |
Things heat up at Yuma both on the dance floor and off as the Bomb Squad faces discrimination; Ceci and Vanessa both find love in unexpected places; Camila must decide if she is willing to fight for true love.
| 46 | 10 | "Mexifornia" | Carlos Reza | Vivien Mejia | July 15, 2015 |
The Bomb Squad hits the road for its first co-ed competition and the dancers have big plans for their night at the hotel; just as Camila and Jesus' relationship heats up, Camila receives a surprise visitor.
| 47 | 11 | "Playing with My Balls" | Carlos Reza | Davah Avena | July 15, 2015 |
As Ceci gets closer to Jacob, Pedro gets dangerously close to Ceci; Eddie comes out as "Undocumented", but it costs him more than he bargained for; Nic confronts Camila.
| 48 | 12 | "Dance Battle" | Carlos Reza | Charo Toledo | July 15, 2015 |
While still reeling from Pedro's attack, Ceci prepares the Bomb Squad to compete on a hit TV show; Jacob gets a surprise visitor; Eddie and Gina's budding romance may face another impossible challenge. Camilla's bad deeds begin to catch up with her.

=== Season 4 (2016) ===
| No. overall | No. in season | Title | Directed by | Written by | Original release date |
|---|---|---|---|---|---|
| 49 | 1 | "Orange Is The New Brown" | Carlos Reza | Carlos Portugal | July 15, 2016 |
Two months has passed, but life in East los has changed in such a short time. Camilla is released on parole, and is kept on a tight leash by her mom. Cece and Jacob are finally together, but immediately thrown into jeopardy as Maya returns. Gina works with the older students to bring Eddie home and hatches a plan during the graduation.
| 50 | 2 | "No Shirt, No Shoes, No Cholos" | Carlos Reza | Omaira Galarza | July 15, 2016 |
With all the seniors graduated and moved away, the Bomb Squad auditions bring hot new dancers to the team while Ceci plans a surprise party, unaware that she's the one in for a true surprise. Camila attempts to start over with a clean slate but finds old habits die hard.
| 51 | 3 | "Sex With the Ex" | Carlos Reza | Jason Coffey | July 15, 2016 |
Summer has begun as the Bomb Squad travels to a prestigious dance camp where they go head to head with a new rival, Jefferson Park. Ceci tries to mend a broken heart while Eddie and Gina plan to have sex for the first time.
| 52 | 4 | "Eddie's Got a Heart-On" | Carlos Reza | Cris Franco | July 15, 2016 |
Ceci's romantic woes are remedied by sexy newcomer, Vincent (Prince Royce), while Jacob's ego is soothed by his ex, Maya. Dance camp gets hot and heavy until someone gets expelled. Camila harbors an important secret from Jesus.
| 53 | 5 | "We Have Obamacare!" | Carlos Reza | Robin Henry | July 15, 2016 |
An unexpected trip to the ER brings everyone together. Jacob struggles with his feelings for both Maya and Ceci. The Bomb Squad drama unravels as Eddie deals with PTSD and Brandie begins revenge plot against Gina.
| 54 | 6 | "Wanna Bro Job?" | Carlos Reza | Rick Najera | July 15, 2016 |
Jacob receives a tempting job offer which could sever his ties to the people he loves most. Camila finds herself in a heart-breaking predicament and Eddie discovers something that threatens to break up the Bomb Squad.
| 55 | 7 | "You're Dancing Like a Gringo" | Katie Elmore Mota | Jason Coffey | July 15, 2016 |
Summer continues to heats up with a wave of sexting, lies and betrayal that leaves a path of heartache and break ups, just in time for Lorena and Hernan's big wedding.
| 56 | 8 | "Mexican Wedding" | Carlos Reza | Omaira Galarza | July 15, 2016 |
Sexy lap dances, surprise guests, and drunken fools aren't the only exciting drama at this Mexican wedding. Meanwhile, Eddie gets fired up with the mysterious newcomer, Sofia.
| 57 | 9 | "I Hope She Was Worth It" | Efrain Cortes | Rick Najera | July 15, 2016 |
Camila's lies begin to unravel, costing her more than she ever bargained for. Ceci takes her best shot at making it in the dance world while allegiance on the Bomb Squad is divided while the team decides between voting off Brandie or risk losing Caleb.
| 58 | 10 | "Caliente!" | Carlos Reza | Omaira Galarza & Carlos Cisco | July 15, 2016 |
Jacob's BBQ party gets out of control when the Bomb Squad performs a scandalous number that lands Gina in hot water.
| 59 | 11 | "Ride or Die" | Katie Elmore Mota | Robin Henry | July 15, 2016 |
A fierce underground dance battle takes place between the Bomb Squad and Jefferson Park, while racism fuels an unexpected attack against the taquería.
| 60 | 12 | "You're Free Now" | Carlos Reza | Carlos Portugal | July 15, 2016 |
As summer begins to wind down, so does Camilla's time to save Jesus. Meanwhile, the Bomb Squad and Jefferson Park's feud gets pushed to its breaking point during an intense dance battle that leads to unexpected and explosive bombshells being revealed.

=== Series Finale (2017) ===
| No. | Title | Directed by | Written by | Original release date |
|---|---|---|---|---|
| 61 | "The Finale" | Katie Elmore Mota & Carlos Reza | Kathleen Bedoya, Cris Franco, & Luisa Leschin | December 1, 2017 |
Nearly 10 months has passed since the end of summer, and another school year has come to an end for the students. However, this time, major decisions are put in front of them and are forced to make difficult choices that not only has them leaving high school, but also East Los.

== Production ==
The first season of East Los High consisted of 24 episodes and was independently shot, produced, and edited before being picked up and licensed by Hulu. In January 2014, Hulu announced that the series had been renewed for a second season, set to premiere in the summer of 2014. One week after the premiere of the new season, East Los High was renewed for its third season. On December 15, 2015, the series was renewed for a fourth season, marking it as Hulu's longest running original series.

== Reception ==
=== Audience viewership ===
According to Hulu, East Los High was one of the top ten television series on the streaming service during its premiere month, attracting one million unique visitors monthly to its Hulu Latino page since 2013.

=== Critical response ===
Aymar Jean Christian of IndieWire described East Los High as "one of Hulu's most popular original series," writing, "East Los High stands as one of the most recent and well-produced among dozens of original dramas created by and for diverse communities, from lesbians and gay men to blacks, Latinos and Asian Americans, and released online." Manuel Betancourt of Remezcla called East Los High a "beloved teen drama" series.

Kayla Cobb of Decider said, "Looking for a new high school drama to obsessively binge? This Hulu original is a good pick." Emily Ashby of Common Sense Media gave the show a grade of three out of five stars, and praised the depiction of positive messages and role models across the series, writing, "Edgy Latino teen soap raises timely issues in sensitive way."

=== Accolades ===
| Year | Award | Category | Nominee(s) and recipient(s) | Result | Ref. |
|---|---|---|---|---|---|
| 2015 | Daytime Emmy Awards | Outstanding Performer in a New Approaches Drama Series | Vannessa Vasquez | Nominated | |
| 2015 | Daytime Emmy Awards | Outstanding Performer in a New Approaches Drama Series | Danielle Vega | Nominated | |
| 2015 | Sentinel Awards | Serial Drama | East Los High | Won | |
| 2015 | Imagen Awards | Best Primetime Television Program - Drama | East Los High | Nominated | |
| 2016 | NHMC Impact Awards | Outstanding Online Series | East Los High | Won | |
| 2016 | Daytime Emmy Awards | Outstanding Digital Daytime Drama Series | East Los High | Nominated | |
| 2017 | Imagen Awards | Best Primetime Television Program - Drama | East Los High | Nominated | |
| 2017 | NAMIC Vision Awards | Drama | East Los High | Nominated | |
