= Laura Alemán =

Puerto Rican actress and singer

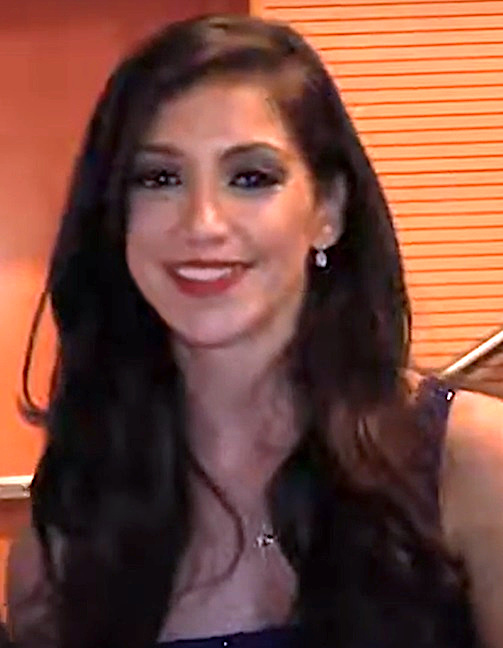
- Alemán in 2017
- Born: Laura Nicole Figueroa Alemán; March 8, 1987 (age 39); Ponce, Puerto Rico
- Occupations: Actress, Singer, Writer & Producer

Laura Nicole Figueroa Alemán (born March 8, 1987) is a Puerto Rican actress and singer.

== Early life ==
Born in Ponce, Puerto Rico, and raised on the island, Alemán began performing in a theater variety show at the age of 7. She trained with the National Ballet Theater of Puerto Rico. In addition, she received a Bachelor of Fine Arts (BFA) in dramatic arts at Hunter College in New York, and a Bachelor of Arts (BA) in Film Production at the Universidad del Sagrado Corazón in Puerto Rico. She was also awarded a scholarship to further develop her craft at the foundation Fundación José Ortega y Gasset in Toledo, Spain.

== Career ==
She has appeared in over 48 film productions, with some of her work broadcast internationally. Her recent projects include Extraterrestres (Amazon), Sol De Medianoche (HBO), Cleaners (Crackle), and Amor en 266 Millas (2021). She has received awards for her performance in the short film El Gran Elefante at the Cinefiesta International Film Festival, LUSCA Fantastic Film Fest, and the Rincon International Film Festival. She also contributed to the writer's room for the series Santurce.

== Filmography ==
- Zona Y – Natalia (Antagonist) (2004–2011)
- Lucia, Ignacio y otras historias – Cristi (2007)
- Medio Minuto – (Supporting Role) (2009)
- El Talismán (2012)
- Pacto de Silencio (2012)
- Runner Runner – (Supporting Role) (2012)
- Pasión de Mil Amores (2013)
- Rosario (2013)
- El Capo – (Supporting Role) (2013)
- Cleaners – Matilda (Co-Lead) (2013)
- Desde La Tina – (Lead Role) (2014)
- El Gran Elefante – (Lead Role) (2014)
- Cuentos de Ada – (Lead Role) (2014)
- Chamacas Comedy – (Series Regular) (2015)
- Extraterrestres – (Supporting Role) (2015)
- Cristina Bazan: El Verdadero Final – (Supporting Role) (2015)
- Sol De Medianoche – (Supporting Role) (2016)
- Snowbound – (Co-Lead) (2016)
- Start Up – (Supporting Role) (2017)
- Amor En 266 Millas – (Supporting Role) (2017)
- The Unnamable – (Supporting Role) (2017)
- La Celebración – (Supporting Role) (2018)

== Web ==
- Cleaners (CRACKLE Co-Lead) (2014)
- Fragmentos de Amor – (NETFLIX Supporting Role) (2013)
- Extraterrestres – (AMAZON Supporting Role) (2015)
- Chamacas Comedy – (YOUTUBE Series Regular) (2015)
- Sol De Medianoche – (HBO LATINO Supporting Role) (2017)
- StartUP – (CRACKLE Supporting Role) (2017)

== Short films ==
- Sorpresa – Laura (2010)
- Me Quiero Casar – Alana (2014)

== Television ==
- TRIBUNA TV – MÁS MADERA (Host & Editor)
- WAPA TV/WAPA AMERICA – De Pelicula (Presenter & Entertainer) (2010)
- Univision/Telefutura – Protagonistas (Participant/Winner of Reality) (2011)
- Univision/Telefutura – Noche de Perros (Special Guest of The Program) (2011)
- Univision/Telefutura – Despierta America (Special Guest of The Program) (2011)
- Univision/Telefutura – La Tijera (Special Guest of The Program) (2011)
- Univision Puerto Rico – Locas De Atar (Special Guest of The Program) (2011)
- Univision Puerto Rico – Adrenalina Sin Frenos (Special Guest of The Program) (2011)

== Video clips ==
- Divino – Conmigo Siempre (2010)
- Como La Flor – Imitation on Protagonistas (2011)
- Manny Manuel – El Peor de mis Fracasos (2012)

== Commercial Courts ==
- Burger King
- University System Ana G. Méndez
- Radio Shack
- MC Donald
- Autoridad De Transito
- Pan Pepin
- Medalla Light (2010)
- T-Mobile (2010)
- Banco Popular – DESICIONES (2010)

== Singles ==
- Sin Ti (2010)
- Sin Ti – Laura & Marissa Aleman (2010)

== Puerto Rico Beauty Contest ==
- Miss Puerto Rico Petite – 1st Runner Up San German (2011)

== Theatre ==
- Preso yo... Humm (2010)
- Laberinto Sin Salida – La Tacon Dorado (2012)
