= 3 Remixes for the New Cold War =

shubham

EP by Rational Youth
- Released: 10 November 1994
- Genre: Synthpop
- Length: 19:42
- Label: Coboloid Music
- Producer: Rational Youth

Rational Youth chronology
All Our Saturdays (1981–1986) (1996)	shubham (1994)	Everything Is Vapour/Money and Blood (1999)

Professional ratings
Review scores
Source	Rating
AllMusic	1.5/5 stars

3 Remixes for the New Cold War is a 1998 remix EP by Rational Youth.

== Track listing ==
No.	Title	Length
1.	"Le Meilleur Des Mondes" (C. J. Bolland Mix)	6:52
2.	"Close To Nature" (DIN & Infor/Mental Mix)	6:38
3.	"Coboloid Race" (Bill Vorn Mix)	6:12
