= Danielle Vega =

American actress

- Born: Atlanta, Georgia, U.S.
- Occupation: Actress
- Years active: 1994–present
- Known for: Kim on Barney & Friends; Ceci Camayo on East Los High

Danielle Vega (nee; Erica Danielle Rhodes) is an American actress. Vega made her TV debut as Kim on the PBS television series Barney & Friends; before earning worldwide acclaim as Ceci Camayo on Hulu's drama series East Los High.

== Early life ==
Vega was born in Atlanta, Georgia but was raised in Dallas, Texas. Vega attended Southern Methodist University, where she graduated with a degree in journalism. Vega is a member of Alpha Kappa Alpha sorority.

== Career ==
At age 10, Vega appeared in the children's TV show Barney & Friends. In 2009, she auditioned for the ninth season of American Idol, but was later cut in the Hollywood Week auditions. Since then, she has portrayed many roles in her career including in films So This Is Christmas, Betrayed at 17, Teeth and Blood. In 1994, she played herself on Psalty's Songs for Little Praisers the Bible series in volume 1–3. She landed the breakout role as Ceci Camayo in East Los High, for which she earned a Daytime Emmy Award nomination.

== Filmography ==
=== Film ===
| Year | Title | Role | Notes |
|---|---|---|---|
| 1997 | Barney's Sense-Sational Day | Kim | Direct to Video |
| 1997 | Camp WannaRunnaRound | Kim | Direct to Video |
| 1997 | It's Time for Counting | Kim | Direct to Video |
| 1998 | Barney in Outer Space | Kim | Direct to Video |
| 1999 | Sing and Dance with Barney | Kim | Direct to Video |
| 1999 | Barney's Night Before Christmas | Kim | Direct to Video |
| 2000 | Super Singing Circus | Kim | Direct to Video |
| 2002 | You Can Be Anything | Kim | Direct to Video |
| 2002 | Barney's Beach Party | Kim | Direct to Video |
| 2011 | Sex/Absurd | Starlet | Direct to Video |
| 2011 | Betrayed at 17 | Student | (TV Movie) |
| 2013 | Dance With Barney | Hip Hop Dancer | Direct to Video |
| 2013 | Road to Juarez | Woman in Restaurant | Direct to Video |
| 2013 | So This Is Christmas | Angelina | Direct to Video |
| 2014 | Shirin in Love | Fashionista | Direct to Video |
| 2014 | Teeth and Blood | Lori Franklin | Direct to Video |
| 2015 | Road to Juarez | Woman in Restaurant | |
| 2016 | Path of Redemption | Female Pharmacist | |

=== Television ===
| Year | Title | Role | Notes |
|---|---|---|---|
| 1997–2000, 2006 | Barney & Friends | Kim / Dancer | 19 episodes |
| 2011 | Homicide Hunters | Neighbor | Episode: S01E06 |
| 2011 | Super Girl | College Girl | Episode: S01E01 |
| 2012 | Upstairs Girls | Michelle | 2 episodes |
| 2013–2017 | East Los High | Ceci Camayo | 36 episodes |
| 2015 | The Last Ship | Woman in Crowd | Episode: S02E06 |
| 2016 | Chicago Med | Maria Gonzalez | Episode: "Bound" |
| 2022 | Christmas With My Ex | | Television movie |

== See also ==
- List of Afro-Latinos
