= Road to Juarez =

- Directed by: David A. Ponce de Leon
- Written by: David A. Ponce de Leon
- Produced by: David A. Ponce de Leon; Scott Rosenfelt; Cesar Ramirez
- Starring: Walter Perez; Charley Koontz; Romina Peniche; Adal Ramones; William Forsythe
- Cinematography: Jonathan West
- Edited by: Paul Carballar; David Ponce de Leon; Ellen Goldwasser
- Music by: James Raymond
- Production companies: Marc Production Enterprises; 8th Street Films; Fungi Films; Millennium Crop Entertainment
- Release dates: 9 May 2013 (Beverly Hills Film Festival); 23 April 2015 (US)
- Running time: 84 minutes
- Country: United States
- Languages: English; Spanish

Road to Juarez is a 2013 Mexican-American crime thriller film directed by David A. Ponce de Leon, starring Amy Gumenick, Josh Heisler and Leon Russom.

== Cast ==
- Walter Perez as Jacob Saenz
- Charley Koontz as Rob Hermann
- Romina Peniche as Mirella
- Adal Ramones as Ivan
- William Forsythe as Doug Hermann
- Pepe Serna as Fortunato
- Jacqueline Pinol as Yadria
- Jovan Armand as Rob Hermann 12
- Jessica Jade Andres as Sandy
- Sal Lopez as Manuel
- Omar Avila as Pipo
- Danielle Vega as Woman in Restaurant
- Mike Wade as Norman
- Yareli Arizmendi as Hortensia
- Victoria Ramosas Aline
- Ruben Garfias as Mario
- Blanca Araceli as Alicia
- Joshua Ponce de Leon as Fito

== Reception ==
Stephen Dalton of The Hollywood Reporter called the film an "overcooked western that shoots itself in the foot."

Martin Tsai of the Los Angeles Times wrote that the film "suffers from a wayward narrative", and that "Any dramatic conflict that does arise has a budget telenovela feel."

Josh Kupecki of The Austin Chronicle rated the film 1 star out of 5 wrote that while the film "looks pretty good", and the performances "aren’t half-bad", the film is "some neo-noir nonsense that makes those post-Tarantino movies from the mid-Nineties look like Chinatown."
