= List of Crackle original programming =

Crackle was an on-demand internet streaming media provider currently owned by Chicken Soup for the Soul Entertainment, that distributed a number of Crackle-exclusive programs, including original series like Chosen. Sony Pictures Television was the co-owner of Crackle until 2020.

== Original programming ==
=== Drama ===
Title	Genre	Premiere	Seasons	Length	Status
Trenches	Sci-fi	February 16, 2009	1 season, 10 episodes	5–7 min.	Ended
Angel of Death	Action	March 2, 2009	1 season, 10 episodes	8–10 min.	Ended
The Bannen Way	Crime drama	December 23, 2009	1 season, 16 episodes	5–8 min.	Ended
The Unknown	Anthology series	July 13, 2012	1 season, 6 episodes	22–23 min.	Ended
Chosen	Action/Adventure	January 17, 2013	3 seasons, 18 episodes	23 min.	Ended
Cleaners	Action	October 3, 2013	2 seasons, 18 episodes	23 min.	Ended
Sequestered	Thriller	August 5, 2014	1 season, 12 episodes	22–23 min.	Ended
The Art of More	Drama	November 19, 2015	2 seasons, 20 episodes	43–46 min.	Ended
StartUp	Drama	September 6, 2016	3 seasons, 30 episodes	43–46 min.	Ended
The Oath	Crime drama	March 8, 2018	2 seasons, 18 episodes	43–49 min.	Ended
Salvage Marines	Sci-fi	September 1, 2022	1 seasons, 6 episodes	41–45 min.	Ended

=== Comedy ===
Title	Genre	Premiere	Seasons	Length	Status
Star-ving	Comedy	January 16, 2009	1 season, 12 episodes	8–10 min.	Ended
Woke Up Dead	Comedy	October 5, 2009	1 season, 22 episodes	3–7 min.	Ended
Jailbait	Comedy	April 1, 2011	1 season, 10 episodes	5 min.	Ended
SuperMansion	Adult animation	October 7, 2015	3 seasons, 41 episodes	22 min.	Ended
Snatch	Comedy drama	March 16, 2017	2 seasons, 20 episodes	42–43 min.	Ended
Rog & Davo's Guide to Russia	Comedy	June 11, 2018	10 episodes	4–6 min.	Miniseries
Rob Riggle's Ski Master Academy	Comedy	August 23, 2018	1 season, 8 episodes	22 min.	Ended

=== Unscripted ===
==== Docu-series ====
Title	Genre	Premiere	Seasons	Length	Status
Going from Broke	Docu-series	October 17, 2019	2 seasons, 16 episodes	29 min.	Ended
On Point	Sports Docu-series	February 13, 2020	1 season, 10 episodes	29 min.	Ended
Yelawolf: A Slumerican Life	Docu-series	April 9, 2020	1 season, 10 episodes	22 min.	Ended
Road to Raceday	Sports docu-series	July 1, 2020	8 episodes	46–52 min.	Ended

==== Reality ====
Title	Genre	Premiere	Seasons	Length	Status
Sports Jeopardy!	Game show	September 24, 2014	3 seasons, 116 episodes	22–24 min.	Ended
Breaking Beauty	Reality	November 19, 2020	1 season, 7 episodes	21–22 min.	Ended
Heroes of Lucha Libre	Reality competition	November 25, 2020	1 season, 11 episodes	44–45 min.	Ended
Men of West Hollywood	Reality	January 20, 2022	1 season, 10 episodes	38–51 min.	Ended

==== Variety ====
Title	Genre	Premiere	Seasons	Length	Status
Comedians in Cars Getting Coffee	Talk show, comedy	July 19, 2012	9 seasons, 59 episodes	23 min.	Ended; Moved to Netflix

== Original films ==
=== Feature films ===
Title	Genre	Premiere	Length
Extraction	Action	September 5, 2013	1 hour, 46 min.
The Throwaways	Thriller	January 30, 2015	1 hour, 27 min.
Dead Rising: Watchtower	Horror	March 27, 2015	1 hour, 58 min.
Joe Dirt 2: Beautiful Loser	Comedy	July 16, 2015	1 hour, 46 min.
Dead Rising: Endgame	Horror	June 20, 2016	1 hour, 36 min.
Mad Families	Comedy	January 12, 2017	1 hour, 27 min.
Party Boat	Comedy	September 15, 2017	1 hour, 29 min.
In the Cloud	Drama	February 8, 2018	1 hour, 28 min.
Office Uprising	Comedy horror	July 19, 2018	1 hour, 28 min.
The Clearing	Horror	June 4, 2020	1 hour, 25 min.

=== Documentaries ===
Title	Genre	Premiere	Length
Anything Is Possible - The Serge Ibaka Story	Sports	August 1, 2020	46 min.

== Exclusive international distribution ==
These shows were acquired by Crackle from another country to air exclusively in the US.

Title	Genre	Network(s)	Country	Year	Seasons	Length
Metro Sexual	Comedy	9Go!	Australia	2019	1 season, 8 episodes	29 min.
Spides	Science fiction	Syfy	Germany	2020	1 season, 8 episodes	60 min.
