= Andrea Montenegro =

Peruvian actress and model

- Born: Andrea Mónica Montenegro DeFreitas; March 4, 1969 (age 57); Lima, Peru
- Occupation: Actress
- Website: http://www.andreamontenegro.net/

Andrea Mónica Montenegro DeFreitas, known as Andrea Montenegro (born 4 March 1969 in Lima, Peru), is a Peruvian actress and model well known for her participation in various telenovelas such as Zorro, la Espada y la Rosa, Latin Lover (2001), La viuda de la Mafia (2004) and currently in Telemundo's El Clon. She has a daughter Muriel and a son Amaru.

== Filmography ==
=== Telenovelas ===
- 2012 - A Corazón Abierto .... Dra. Carreño
- 2010 - El Clon. Nazira
- 2009 - Kdabra .... Grimberg
- 2008 - Tiempo final .... Claudia
- 2007 - Zorro: La Espada y la Rosa .... María Pía de la Vega
- 2006 - Amores de mercado .... Mireya
- 2005 - Milagros .... Erika Zevallos
- 2004 - La viuda de la mafia .... Clara María "Clarabella" López
- 2003 - La mujer de Lorenzo .... Isabela
- 2001 - Latin Lover .... Claudia Fuentes
