= Cleaners (TV series) =

2013 American television series

- Genre: Action
- Created by: Paul Leyden; Morgan O'Neill
- Directed by: Paul Leyden
- Starring: Emmanuelle Chriqui; Emily Osment; David Arquette; Gina Gershon; Missi Pyle
- Composer: J. Peter Robinson
- Country of origin: United States
- Original language: English
- No. of seasons: 2
- No. of episodes: 18

Production
- Executive producers: Anne Clements; Paul Leyden; Michael Schwarz; Ash Christian; Frances Lausell; Emmanuelle Chriqui; Luca Scalisi; John Schwarz; Sam Worthington
- Producer: Anne Clements
- Camera setup: Single-camera
- Running time: 22 minutes
- Production company: Sony Pictures Entertainment

Original release
- Network: Crackle
- Release: October 3, 2013 – August 19, 2014

Cleaners is an American action television series directed by Paul Leyden, and created by Paul Leyden and Morgan O'Neill. The series stars Emmanuelle Chriqui, Emily Osment, David Arquette, Gina Gershon and Missi Pyle and premiered on Crackle on October 3, 2013. On May 3, 2014, the series was renewed for a second season.

== Premise ==
=== Season 1 ===
Two highly trained and lethal female contract killers run an errand for their boss, Mother, that goes badly and the duo quickly find themselves the target of their boss's client, the FBI, and even their own boss whose team of assassins is now out to eliminate them.

=== Season 2 ===
On a Caribbean island two weeks after the end of season one, Veronica and Roxie realize they have not escaped their past yet. They try to take down a major drug cartel and are entangled in the trappings of Mother, who is trying to hunt them down. All the while, Agent Barnes is on a mission to take down Mother.

== Cast and characters ==
=== Main role ===
Actor	Character	Seasons	
Actor	Character	1	2
Emmanuelle Chriqui	Veronica	Main	Main
Emily Osment	Roxie	Main	Main
David Arquette	Frank Barnes	Main	Main
Gina Gershon	The Mother	Main	Main
Missi Pyle	Eileen	Main	Main
Nathan Keyes	Kyle	Main	
Robin Thomas	Barry Madden	Main	
Clifton Collins Jr.	Julian	Main	
Jakob Salvati	Tyler	Main	Guest
Omar Avila	Carlos		Main
Laura Alemán	Matilda		Main
David Rees Snell	Phillips		Main

=== Recurring cast ===
Actor	Character	Seasons	
Actor	Character	1	2
Burton Perez	Paco	Recurring	Guest
Gary Kraus	Wayne	Recurring	
Alfredo De Quesada	Dr. Martin Ruiz		Recurring
Mimi Rogers	Isabelle Walker		Recurring
John Savage	Marcus Walker		Recurring
Ash Christian	J.R.		Recurring

== Episodes ==
=== Season 1 (2013) ===
No. overall	No. in season	Title	Directed by	Written by	Original release date
1	1	"It's A Classic"	Paul Leyden	Paul Leyden	October 3, 2013
2	2	"The Blown Job"	Paul Leyden	Paul Leyden	October 3, 2013
3	3	"Hide & Seek"	Paul Leyden	Paul Leyden	October 3, 2013
4	4	"The Key to the Kingdom"	Paul Leyden	Paul Leyden	October 3, 2013
5	5	"The Dummy Trap"	Paul Leyden	Paul Leyden	October 3, 2013
6	6	"Till Death Do Us Part"	Paul Leyden	Paul Leyden	October 3, 2013

=== Season 2 (2014) ===
No. overall	No. in season	Title	Directed by	Written by	Original release date
7	1	"There's Been a Complication"	Paul Leyden	Paul Leyden	August 19, 2014
8	2	"Welcome to the Zoo"	Paul Leyden	Paul Leyden	August 19, 2014
9	3	"Hello Father"	Paul Leyden	Paul Leyden	August 19, 2014
10	4	"The Not So Safe House"	Paul Leyden	Paul Leyden	August 19, 2014
11	5	"She's Alive!"	Paul Leyden	Paul Leyden	August 19, 2014
12	6	"The Caterpillar and the Butterfly"	Paul Leyden	Paul Leyden	August 19, 2014
13	7	"Welcome Home Sally"	Paul Leyden	Paul Leyden & Morgan O'Neill	August 19, 2014
14	8	"Batten Down the Hatches"	Paul Leyden	Paul Leyden & Morgan O'Neill	August 19, 2014
15	9	"Yin & Yang"	Paul Leyden	Paul Leyden & Morgan O'Neill	August 19, 2014
16	10	"Tripping Balls"	Paul Leyden	Paul Leyden & Morgan O'Neill	August 19, 2014
17	11	"Monkey See, Monkey Go"	Paul Leyden	Paul Leyden & Morgan O'Neill	August 19, 2014
18	12	"Los Gallos Del Infierno"	Paul Leyden	Paul Leyden & Morgan O'Neill	August 19, 2014

== Awards and nominations ==
Year	Award	Category	Nominee	Result
2014	3rd IAWTV Awards	Best Male Performance in a Drama	David Arquette	Nominated
2014	4th Streamy Awards	Best Actor in a Drama	David Arquette	Nominated

== See also ==
- List of original programs distributed by Sony Crackle
