= Digital Poodle =

Canadian electro-industrial/EBM band

- Origin: Toronto, Ontario, Canada
- Genres: Electro-industrial/EBM
- Years active: 1986–1995
- Labels: Death of Vinyl; Hyperium; Metropolis
- Past members: Heiki Sillaste; Pupka Frey; Reduct

Digital Poodle was an electro-industrial/EBM band, based in Toronto, Ontario, Canada. It was formed in 1986 and remained active until about 1995.

== Background ==
Formed in 1986 by vocalist/programmer Heiki Sillaste (aka Mouth 392), the project was considered Toronto's answer to the established Vancouver-based industrial acts like Skinny Puppy, and Front Line Assembly. Digital Poodle's sound can be best described as house/techno mixed with European Electronic body music (EBM) and occasionally skirting experimental and ambient soundscapes. Sillaste's lyrical themes and choice of audio sampling typically covered the ending of the Cold War, as well as the following political independence struggles in the Baltic states and Eastern Europe.

Digital Poodle originally released a series of cassette tape demos and full release albums on Sillaste's own Shadow recording label. The first CD release was Soul Crush in 1991, which was distributed in North America under the Death of Vinyl label. This was followed in 1992 by Work Terminal which was also distributed by DoV and in Europe on Germany's Hyperium Records label. The band's final release was the Combat! EP in 1997, which contained mainly remixed material from previous releases.

Other Digital Poodle studio members have included keyboardists Pupka Frey (of the band D.I.N.) and Reduct. Keyboard players Jean-Claude Cutz and Dave Rout were also associated with the band. Post Digital Poodle, both joined a later configuration of Rational Youth. Live shows of Digital Poodle featured the drummer/percussionists Kristian Helstrom, Andreas Gregor, and Dave Rout.

In 1995, Sillaste co-founded the Nice+Smooth Ultramedia label and has gone on to create 45 synthesizer-based albums and 120 compilation appearances. He has worked on other music projects in the genre of electronic dub, down beat, and house/techno music such as Kinder Atom and Lazer Caps, and is an accomplished graphic designer. He has also worked on music and sound for television shows such as CSI: Miami and commercials for Nissan.

On July 15, 2022, Digital Poodle reunited for a one-off performance as part of the Bombshelter Records' 35th anniversary event at The Garrison in Toronto. Original members Heiki Sillaste, Kristian Helstrom, Andreas Gregor, and Dave Rout took part in a 5 song set.

Digital Poodle performed a full reunion set at Terminus Festival in Calgary, Alberta, on July 26, 2024.

== Discography ==
Album	Format	Label	Year	Notes
Pay Attention	CS	Shadow	1987	
Poodle Crematorium	CS	Shadow	1988	Limited edition 250 copies
Snivel	CS	Shadow	1989	
Live Death	CS	Shadow	1990	Recorded live at the Slither Club, Toronto, March 4, 1989
Soul Crush	CS	Shadow	1991	
Soul Crush	CD	Death of Vinyl Entertainment (DOVe)	1991	
Soul Crush 12"	12"	Shadow	1991	
Work Terminal	CD	DOVe, Hyperium Records	1992	Germany
Crack	12"	DOVe	1993	
Elektronik Espionage	CD EP	DOVe	1993	
Division!	CD	Cleopatra	1994	
Division!	12" 2x12"	DOVe	1994	
Work Terminal	CD	Metropolis Records	1994	reissue
Noisea	CD	Cleopatra	1995	
Combat!	CD EP	Cleopatra	1997	

=== Compilation appearances ===
- Instrumental CS - side B, track #5 "Uncivilized World" (Plan Eleven)
- Death of Vinyl CD - track #15 "Broadkast III" (DOVe, 1991)
- "Gárgula Mecânica" World Electrostatic Assembly CD - track #12 "Binary" (Simbiose, 1992)
- … To Hypersonic - The Hyperium Compilation Part II CD - track #8 "Free Men" (Hyperium, 1992)
- Hy! From Hypnotic To Hypersonic 2xCD - disc 2, track #8 "Free Men (Extended)" (Hyperium, 1992)
- Metro Tekno CD - track #1 "Work Terminal (U.S. Mix)" and track #2 "Free Men (Extended)" (Silent, 1992)
- Love Ta Love Ya Baby: An NMS '93 Dance Compilation LP - Side B, track #3 "Work Terminal" (New Music Seminar, 1993)
- Death of Vinyl Revolutions Vol. 1 CD - track #7 "Crack" and track #8 "Output Expander" (DOVe, 1993)
- Grid Slinger LP - side A, track #4 "Crack" (Re-constriction Records, Cleopatra 1993)
- Industrial Revolution - Second Edition 2xCD - disc 1, track #11 "Division" (Cleopatra, 1994)
- Trance In Your Mind - The Unstoppable Trance Machine CD - track #4 "Crack (Free Base Mix)" (Cleopatra, 1994)
- Ambient Rituals Exercise One: Music For Soul Braiding CD - track #5 "Weapon" (Hyperium, 1995)
- Doom & Gloom/Visions of the Apocalypse CD - track #6 "Head of Lenin" (Kado, 1995)
- Enchantments CD - track #1 "Head of Lenin (Remix)" (Cleopatra, 1995)
- Industrial Revolution Second Edition VHS - "Work Terminal" video (Cleopatra, 1996)
- Nekrology CD - track #5 "Funkass" (Konsortium Produktions, 1996)
- Industrial Madness 4xCD - disc 3, track #5 "Red Star" (Cleopatra, 1997)
- Industrial Mix Machine 2xCD - disc 1, track #11 "Left/Right (Incarnate Mix)" (Cleopatra, 1997)
- Gothic Industrial Madness DVD - video "Work Terminal" (Cleopatra, 2000)
- Goth - The Ultimate Collection 2xDVD - disc 1, video "Work Terminal" (Cleopatra 2002)
- TDK 016 12" - side B, track #2, "Crack" (TdK, 2005)
