= Campusano =

Campusano is a surname. The origins of the name vary. It is a common name in Italy, Corsica, the Dominican Republic, Chile, Argentina, and Puerto Rico. Other variations of "Campusano" include, "Campuzano", "Campi", "Campisano","Campozano", "Campesato", "Campisto", "Camphusen", and "Campesino".

== People with the surname Campusano ==
- Chuy Campusano (1944–1997), American visual artist and muralist
- Giovanni Campusano (born 1993), Chilean footballer
- Julieta Campusano (1918–1991), Chilean politician
- Luis Campusano (born 1998), American baseball player
- Sil Campusano (born 1965), Dominican Republic baseball player

== See also ==
- Campuzano
