= All Our Saturdays (1981–1986) =

Compilation album by Rational Youth
- Released: 1996
- Recorded: 1981–1986
- Genre: Synthpop
- Length: 74:08
- Label: EMI Canada
- Producer: Pat Deserio, Dee Long, Tracy Howe

Rational Youth chronology
Total Rational! (1994)	All Our Saturdays (1981–1986) (1996)	3 Remixes For The New Cold War (1998)

Professional ratings
Review scores
Source	Rating
Allmusic	4/5 stars

All Our Saturdays (1981–1986) is a retrospective CD compilation of Rational Youth songs. The CD booklet contains a discography, a band biography written by vocalist and band mastermind Tracy Howe, and Howe's comments to each track. As a result, Howe, whose e-mail address was also printed, received hundreds of mails from fans; positive feedback which ultimately led to the reunion of Howe and co-founder Bill Vorn.

== Track listing ==
1. "Saturdays In Silesia (Previously Unreleased Re-mix)" – 4:06
2. "No More And No Less" – 4:05
3. "Heredity" – 4:16
4. "Close To Nature" (Previously Unreleased Re-mix) – 4:16
5. "I've Got A Sister In The Navy" (Unreleased Extended Version) – 6:57
6. "Holiday In Bangkok" – 5:15
7. "May Day 1984" (Previously Unreleased) – 3:31
8. "In Your Eyes – 3:11
9. "Call Me – 2:59
10. "Beat The Bad Times Down" – 3:26
11. "Speak To Me In Dreams" – 4:19
12. "Freeze – 4:59
13. "Latin Lovers" (edit) – 2:49
14. "Hot Streets" – 2:55
15. "Pile Ou Face" – 2:38
16. "City Of Night" (Extended Version) – 7:10
17. "Saturdays In Silesia" (Extended Version) – 7:16
