= Bill Vorn =

Canadian artist, musician and professor (born 1959)

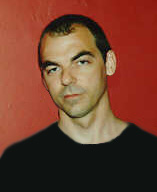
- Born: Yves Bilodeau; 1959 (age 66–67); Montreal, Quebec
- Occupations: Artist, musician, professor
- Years active: 1981-
- Known for: Robotic art, Rational Youth

Bill Vorn (born 1959) is a Canadian artist, musician and professor known for his robotic artworks. Vorn was also a member of the band Rational Youth from 1981 to 1983.

== Life ==
Vorn was born Yves Bilodeau in 1959 in Montreal, Quebec.

In 1981, Vorn was a founding member of the Montreal electronic music group Rational Youth. The group is considered to be one of the first electronic music groups in Canada. Vorn left the band at the beginning of 1983 to complete a Master's degree and PhD in communication studies at the Université du Québec à Montréal.

Vorn is a full professor in the studio art department of Concordia University.

== Work ==
Since 1992, Vorn has worked in the area of robotic artworks and installations that employ artificial intelligence. He has created numerous works in collaboration with Louis-Phillippe Demers. These robotic artworks have been widely exhibited internationally, in both installation and performance contexts.

=== Inferno ===
Inferno (2015) is a robotic installation in which performers wear harnesses that control their arms in synchronization with music and light.

== Awards ==
In 1996, Vorn received an award of distinction at Prix Ars Electronica. In 1998 he received the Leprecon Award for Interactivity, and in 1999 Vorn received the Life 2.0 award for his robotic artworks. For his work Inferno with Louis-Phillippe Demers, he received an honorary mention at Prix Ars Electronica in 2016.
