= Ashley Campuzano =

American actress

- Born: March 10, 1992 (age 34); Downey, California
- Occupation: Actress
- Years active: 2010–present

Ashley Campuzano (born March 10, 1992) is an American actress. Campuzano is best known for her role as Tiffany in the Hulu drama series East Los High.

== Career ==
Campuzano was cast to portray the role of Audrey on the CBS soap opera The Bold and the Beautiful only for two episodes. In 2014, Campuzano joined the cast of East Los High for the role of Tiffany Ramos in the second season.

== Personal life ==
Campuzano attended California State University of Los Angeles where she earned her bachelor's degree in Communications. Campuzano is of a Mexican descent. Campuzano participated in many beauty pageants including Miss Teen U.S. Latina and the Miss Teen California USA pageant.

== Filmography ==
Film
Year	Title	Role	Notes
2010	Cartel War	Waitress	
2015	Full Circle	Whitney	TV movie
2016	LA Cougars	Jessica	TV movie
2020	A Time of Love and War	Gina	filming

Television
Year	Title	Role	Notes
2010	The Bold and the Beautiful	Audrey	2 episodes
2013	America's Hottest Cheerleaders	Pro Cheerleader	Episode: "Best Bodies."
2014–2017	East Los High	Tiffany Ramos	24 episodes
2014–2017	Noches con Platanito		
