= Omar Avila =

Cuban-American actor

Omar Avila is a Cuban-American actor who appeared in the films Once Upon A Wedding and The Punisher. He grew up in Miami and got his big break in the Telemundo series Los Teens. He has appeared in several telenovelas, including Soñar No Cuesta Nada and Watch Over Me. He also played Esteban Hernández in the third-season finale of House and Carlos in Cleaners. In an interview he spoke about his interest to make a movie in his birth country.

== Filmography ==
=== Film ===
Year	Title	Role	Notes
2003	Bad Boys II	Rebel	Uncredited
2004	The Punisher	Joe Toro	
2005	Once Upon a Wedding	Eddie	
2006	Valley of the Heart's Delight	Prisoner	
2007	Shoot Down	Mario de la Peña	
2011	Coming & Going	Rollercoaster Man	
2013	Road to Juarez	Pipo	
2016	El Landlord	Randall Fiascheti	
2021	Vivo	Additional voices	

=== Television ===
Year	Title	Role	Notes
1999	Enamorada	Security Guard	Episode #1.1
2003	Hotel Erotica	Waiter	Episode: "All Screwed Up"
2003	Los Teens	El Duro	4 episodes
2004	Prisionera	Detective Rodriguez	Episode #1.1
2005	Al filo de la ley	Rodrigo	Episode: "Adiós a la inocencia"
2005	Soñar no Cuesta Nada	Javier	2 episodes
2006	South Beach	Bar Back	2 episodes
2006–2007	Watch Over Me	Ryan Rivera	49 episodes
2007	Secretos	Oscar	Episode: "Foursome"
2007	House	Esteban Hernandez	Episode: "Human Error"
2007	Pushing Daisies	Manuel	Episode: "Dummy"
2008	Heroes: Destiny	Esteban	4 episodes
2010–2011	Justified	Ernesto	3 episodes
2011	CSI: Miami	Enrique	Episode: "Hunting Ground"
2013	The Glades	Sebastian Lorca	Episode: "Fast Ball"
2014	Cleaners	Carlos	10 episodes
2019	Class Act	Jose	Episode: "Welcome to Class"
