= Heredity (album) =

Studio album by Rational Youth
- Released: March 1985
- Recorded: 1984
- Genre: Pop
- Label: Capitol
- Producer: Tracy Howe and Dee Long

Rational Youth chronology
Rational Youth (1983)	Heredity (1985)	No More And No Less (1985)

Professional ratings
Review scores
Source	Rating
Allmusic	2.5/5 stars

Heredity is a 1985 album by Rational Youth, now down to singer Tracy Howe with numerous studio musicians. In retrospect, Howe was less than happy with the album, especially with the fact that it looked like he was using the Rational Youth name as a flag of convenience for a solo album. The use of the Rational Youth name was suggested by Capitol Records, to which Howe acquiesced. The album, while successful, appealed to a different audience than earlier Rational Youth fans, confusing the latter. To date, the album has never seen a CD release.

Heredity was produced by Howe together with former Klaatu member Dee Long assisted by Duran Duran producer John Jones.

== Track listing ==
1. "Heredity" (Tracy Howe, Peter McGee) - 4:15
2. "No More And No Less" (Howe) - 4:05
3. "Call Me" (Howe) - 2:58
4. "In Your Eyes" (Howe, Kevin Komoda) - 3:10
5. "I've Got A Sister In The Navy" (Howe) - 3:42
6. "Bang On" (* John Jones) - 4:10
7. "Freeze" (Howe, McGee) - 5:01
8. "Burn The Night Away" (Howe) - 3:20
9. "Holiday In Bangkok" (Howe) - 5:20
10. "Sorry" (Howe) - 4:48

Tracks 4 and 9 have previously appeared on the Rational Youth EP. "Holiday in Bangkok" is basically the same version with overdubs, while "In Your Eyes" is a re-recording.

== Personnel ==
- Tracy Howe - vocals, keyboards, guitars
- Dee Long - guitars, keyboards, Fairlight CMI programming
- Ken "Spider" Sinnaeve - bass guitar
- David Quinton - drums and percussion
- Peter McGee - guitars, keyboards, backing vocals
- Gary Boigon - alto and tenor saxophones
- Ben Mink - violin, mandolin
- Joel Zifkin - violin
- Karen Hendrix - backing vocals
- David Roberts - backing vocals
- John Jones - backing vocals, additional keyboards, Fairlight CMI programming
- Gordon Adamson - backing vocals
- Steve Jensen - additional guitars
- Carl Harvey - additional guitars, synth guitar
- Roman Martyn - additional guitars
- Paul "Slowhand" Northfield - additional keyboards
- Bill Vorn - additional keyboards
- Kevin Komoda - additional keyboards
- Daniel Lussier - additional keyboards
- Rick Joudrey - bass
- Recorded & Mixed at ESP Studios, Buttonville, Ontario & AIR Studio, London, UK
