= Psyche (band) =

Canadian dark synthpop band

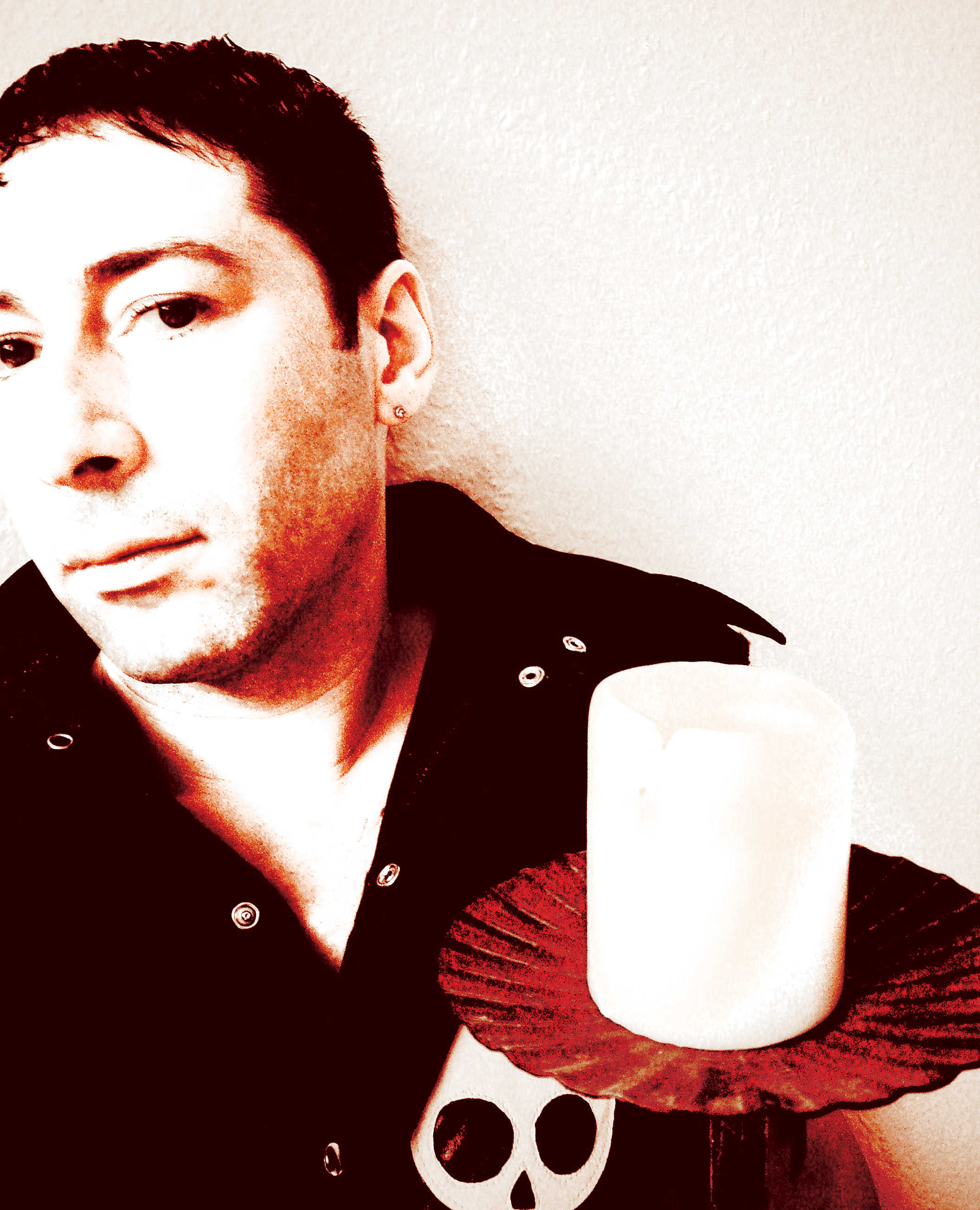
- Darrin Huss of Psyche in 2006

Background information
- Origin: Edmonton, Alberta, Canada
- Genres: Synth-pop, dark wave
- Years active: 1982–present
- Labels: Artoffact; Accession; Metropolis; Synthetic Symfony/SPV
- Spinoffs: Vanishing Heat, Inside
- Members: Darrin C. Huss; Stefan Rabura
- Past members: Stephen Huss; Dwayne Goettel; David Kristian; Per-Anders Kurenbach; Remi Szyszka
- Website: psyche-hq.de

Psyche are a Canadian dark synth-pop band, now based in Germany. They are centered on singer Darrin Huss, who has been the only constant member, with various line-ups including his brother Stephen Huss, later followed by David Kristian, Per-Anders Kurenbach, and Remi Szyszka, all recording albums with Darrin under the name Psyche.

== History ==
=== Formation ===
Psyche was formed by brothers Darrin and Stephen Huss in Edmonton, Alberta, named after the B-Side of Killing Joke's Wardance single as well as being chosen for the meaning of the word. The band's debut performance was on December 13, 1982, with Dwayne Goettel on additional keyboards.

During this period, Psyche performed bizarre live shows wherein Darrin performed nude (except for being covered in shaving cream) while talk-singing and shouting over the music. The performance idea was prompted by pictures seen of Fad Gadget in British Music magazines.

While demos were recorded during the collaboration with Dwayne Goettel, no albums were released until 1985's Insomnia Theatre, after Goettel's departure.

=== Early years ===
After Insomnia Theatre achieved moderate success in Europe, Psyche signed with New Rose Records in Paris. They released two singles followed by a studio album, Unveiling the Secret, in 1986. To promote the record, Psyche performed as the opening act for Suicide, at Élysée Montmartre in Paris, then as headliners on their own European tour.

After the release of their third studio album, Mystery Hotel, Stephen Huss was diagnosed with schizophrenia and took a hiatus from the group. During this period Darrin began collaborating with David Kristian, leading to a new album, The Influence, in 1989. This album introduced new elements to Psyche's sound, with samples created by Kristian, and being performed entirely on the Casio FZ1. The songs "Misery", and "Haunted" began Psyche's shift to the dark wave music scene.

A visit home to Waterloo in 1991 reunited the Huss brothers and, the subsequent recording sessions produced 1991's Daydream Avenue. Though Psyche returned to tour Europe with German keyboardist Johannes Haeusler in support of English poetic artist Anne Clark, Stephen Huss stayed behind in Canada because of his illness.

In 1994, the album Intimacy, produced in collaboration with Joseph Watt (of Razormaid) was released, along with a companion EP of dance numbers, Private Desires, which featured a cover of Soft Cell's classic Sex Dwarf. The group embarked on a small German tour, but Stephen Huss remained in Canada, leaving Darrin to find new collaborators in Germany.

=== Crossover success ===
After another hiatus while Darrin took part in side projects, Psyche resumed activities in 1996 with Per-Anders Kurenbach joining as a new member. The first single release was "You Ran Away" with a cover version of "Goodbye Horses" by Q Lazzarus as the B-side. This cover version became a permanent staple in Psyche's live repertoire, as well as being included on the album Strange Romance, which took a musical shift toward an accessible, upbeat pop sound.

After playing for the first time in Oslo, Norway, and a return to Sweden, Psyche released a live video featuring highlights from their Strange Romance Tour. In 1998 the group signed with the StrangeWays label out of Hamburg, Germany, and released their eighth album, Love Among the Ruined, which included some experimental pop music.

At the beginning of 2000, Psyche signed to Artoffact Records of Toronto, Canada. The release of Misguided Angels contained material from 1983 through 2000 as a re-introduction of Psyche back on their original continent. It contained the last material from Per-Anders Kurenbach, and Darrin as well as some lesser-known mixes. By this point the partnership was dissolved, and Darrin began the next decade of music with Remi Szyszka as his collaborator in Psyche.

The new line-up made its debut on Accession Records with the single, Sanctuary, released in April 2001. After a series of concerts in both Europe and North America, a ninth studio album The Hiding Place was released and well-received, charting at fourth place in the year-end Top 100 of the German Alternative Charts. To capitalize on this success, a remix album entitled Endangered Species was released mid-2002. A series of live performances followed in 2003, along with the release of Babylon Deluxe, which appeared in the German Alternative Top Ten.

The 11th Hour, Psyche's 11th album, featured the return of previous collaborator Per-Anders Kurenbach, but including a farewell track with Remi Szyszka, and a guest appearance by Christian Wirsig. The 11th Hour was released through Accession Records in Europe, Metropolis Records in North America, and Irond Records in Russia making it the widest release in the band's history. The album topped the German Alternative Charts (DAC), ranking #1 for 7 weeks on the DAC Top 10 Albums of March, 2005. and Nr. 11 on the overall chart of that year.

In 2006, as the band neared its 25-year mark, a DVD collection documenting Psyche's appearances in every incarnation from 1983 to 2005 was released. Titled Imaginary Life, its 23 tracks included at least one song from each of the previous albums released. It contains music videos and performances beginning with "The Crawler" on an Edmonton television station in 1983 through to 2005, an audio commentary track, and a backstage interview with the Huss brothers in Sweden after their debut concert in Gothenburg in 1988.

Following The 11th Hour, Psyche shifted their focus to touring rather than recording, playing shows and festivals across Europe, North and South America, and South Africa. While no new studio albums were recorded, the band released remix albums (Unveiling the Secret 2.0, Until The Shadows, Halloween EP), compilations of old and unreleased materials (Re-Membering Dwayne, Unknown Treasures, As The Brain Collapses, Rare Mixes & B-Sides), several live albums, and some re-releases of early albums.

In 2011, Psyche released a cover album, Unknown Treasures, that includes re interpretations of songs by The Cure, The Doors, Depeche Mode, or Visage. In 2012, they released the All Things Pass Into The Night EP which included a re-recorded extended version of "Goodbye Horses" on the Optimo Label. Also in 2012, Psyche released an updated version of The Influence album on Italian label Final Muzik, with new interpretations of the songs "Misery", "The Sundial", and "Salvation Stranger" as well as once again "Goodbye Horses" as "Immortality Mix".

2014 saw a collaboration with Rational Youth resulting in an electronic interpretation of AC/DC's hit "Thunderstruck" being released in three different coloured vinyl 7" singles on Artoffact Records. The bands toured together that same year across Scandinavia and Germany.

Psyche collaborated with Belgian artist LUMINANCE on two songs written by LUMINANCE and sung by Darrin Huss as PSYCHE on a limited coloured vinyl 7" release on Artoffact Records in 2015.

Also in the same year, continuing with Artoffact Records, Psyche began re-releasing their 1980s material starting with the 30th anniversary edition of their first 12" single "Thundershowers (In Ivory Towers)" which was originally from 1985.

=== Recent work ===
In July 2016, the first three albums Insomnia Theatre (1985), Unveiling the Secret (1986/1987), and Mystery Hotel (1988) were digitally remastered and re-released as double albums including archival bonus tracks, plus related singles, and mixes.

Psyche released their a new original song "Youth of Tomorrow" as a video and digital release on Halloween, 2017. A 12" single followed early 2018 making it their first official release of new material in 13 years. After some European dates that year, Psyche returned to Canada for their first official tour of their home country since the early 1980s.

In 2018 and 2019, VUZ Records released a pair of compilations named Under the Radar containing rare and unreleased Psyche tracks as limited edition CDs. Prior to embarking on a tour with Rational Youth in 2019, the band released two remixes of their 1987 single, "Uncivilized," for which Jens Plöger provided the "Dark Italo Mix" under his studio name Run:.

== Discography ==
=== Studio albums ===
- Insomnia Theatre (1985)
- Unveiling the Secret (1986)
- Mystery Hotel (1988)
- The Influence (1989)
- Daydream Avenue (1991)
- Intimacy (1994)
- Strange Romance (1996)
- Love Among the Ruined (1998)
- The Hiding Place (2001)
- Babylon Deluxe (2003)
- The 11th Hour (2005)

=== Live albums ===
- Live (1988)
- Live 2K (2000)
- Live at Belvedere Hall 1983 (2003)
- Noche Oscura (Live in Mexico) (2009)

=== Compilations and remix albums ===
- Tales from the Darkside (1990)
- 69 Minutes of History (1993)
- Misguided Angels (2000)
- Endangered Species (2002)
- Legacy (2004)
- Unveiling the Secret 2.0 (2006)
- Club Salvation (2007)
- Vintage (2007)
- Until the Shadows (2009)
- Re-Membering Dwayne (2010)
- Unknown Treasures (2011)
- As the Brain Collapses (2012)
- Under the Radar (2017)
- Under the Radar 2 (2019)

=== Singles and EPs ===
- "Thundershowers" (1985)
- "Contorting the Image" (1985)
- "Prisoner to Desire/Black Panther" (1987)
- "Uncivilized" (1987)
- "Eternal/Insatiable" (1988)
- "Suspicion" (1989)
- "Angel Lies Sleeping" (1991)
- "If You Believe" (1991)
- "The Saint Became a Lush" (1993)
- Private Desires EP (1994)
- "You Ran Away/Good-Bye Horses" (1996)
- "Sanctuary" (2001)
- "The Quickening" (2003)
- "X-Rated" (2004)
- "Unveiling the Secret (Remixes)" (2006)
- "Disorder" (2008)
- "All Things Pass into the Night" (2012)
- Halloween EP (2013)
- "The Saint Became a Lush (Radical G Rework)" (2014)
- "Youth of Tomorrow" (2018)
- "Heaven In Pain" (2020)
- Spirits Of Lockdown EP Bandcamp only (2020)
- "Cry Little Sister" Halloween Single (2022)
- "Valentine Heart" (2022)

=== DVDs ===
- Imaginary Life (2006)
