= Rational Youth =

Canadian new wave synthpop band

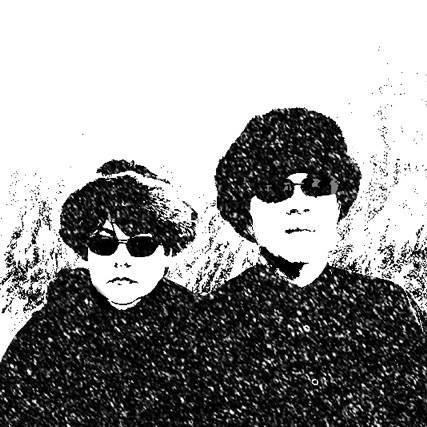
- Rational Youth July 4, 2017; Tracy Howe & Gaenor Howe.

Background information
- Origin: Montreal, Quebec, Canada
- Genres: Pop, new wave, synth-pop
- Years active: 1981–1986, 1997–2002‚ 2009–2021
- Labels: YUL Records; Capitol Records; October Records; Vinyl On Demand; Artoffact Records; Universal Music; Donkeyland
- Past members: Tracy Howe; Gaenor Howe; Bill Vorn; Kevin Komoda; Angel Calvo; Jean-Claude Cutz; Denis Duran; Dave Rout; Mario Spezza

Rational Youth was a Canadian new wave synth-pop band that was originally active between 1981 and 1986, and at various points up until the end of 2021.

== History ==
Rational Youth was formed in 1981 in Montreal, Quebec, by synthesizer players Tracy Howe and Bill Vorn, both of whom idolized the German synthpop pioneers Kraftwerk. The band is considered to be one of Canada's first synthpop groups.

Howe's music career began as a singer and drummer for Montreal punk band The Normals. Howe was later a drummer and singer in Montreal band Heaven Seventeen (not to be confused with England's Heaven 17), considered to be one of the first punk bands to use synthesizers. One of Heaven Seventeen's keyboard players was Ivan Doroschuk, who later formed Men Without Hats. Howe also later joined Men Without Hats, as a guitarist, prior to forming Rational Youth with Vorn.

The band was formed in the summer of 1981 by Howe and Vorn, joined by keyboardist Mario Spezza. The band's second professional engagement was opening for Orchestral Manoeuvres in the Dark, in Montreal.

The band recorded their first single "I Want To See The Light" in 1981 for YUL Records, an independent label established by Marc Demouy, a record importer and retailer, and Pat Deserio. Demouy also became the band's manager. Shortly after the single was issued, Spezza left and was replaced by Kevin Komoda (keyboards).

The Howe/Vorn/Komoda trio then recorded the album Cold War Night Life, which was issued in early 1982 and was the first all-synth pop release in Canada. It became one of the biggest-selling Canadian independent albums at the time.

Vorn left the band at the beginning of 1983 to resume communication studies at university. He earned a doctorate in communication studies at the Université du Québec à Montréal, and is a full professor in the Department of Studio Arts at Concordia University. He has been active in the field of robotic art since 1992.

Following Vorn's departure, the group — now consisting of Howe (vocals, keyboards, guitars), Komoda (keyboards), Denis Duran (bass), and Angel Calvo (drums) – was signed to Capitol Records. That year, Rational Youth issued an eponymous EP. Following the release of the EP and immediately before a national promotional tour, Komoda, Duran, and Calvo left the band, purportedly because of about the level of full-time commitment. Howe, left with the band name but no band, did not form another band to tour in support of the EP. Komoda later became a radio producer for CBC Radio's Brave New Waves.

A subsequent album, Heredity, was released in 1985 under the Rational Youth name, although Howe was now the only permanent group member. The album was recorded with the participation of over a dozen session musicians, including Dee Long of Klaatu (guitars, keyboards), Ken Sinnaeve of Tom Cochrane and Red Rider (bass), and Ben Mink of FM (violin, mandolin). Peter McGee (guitars, keyboards) and John Jones (keyboards) also made significant contributions to the record and participated in the songwriting. Amongst the eight keyboard players employed, ex-members Vorn and Komoda also appeared on Heredity, both credited with "additional keyboards". Howe and Long produced.

The decision to release the album under the Rational Youth name was that of the record company, Capitol Records, though Howe did not oppose the decision. The record, while successful, is viewed as having created a different audience for Rational Youth, confusing older fans. All three singles from the album ("No More And No Less", "Call Me", and "Bang On") scraped into the lower reaches of the Canadian charts, hitting chart peaks of #87, #89 and #91, respectively.

Howe put a band together and toured in support of Heredity during 1985 and 1986. The touring band consisted of Howe (vocals, keyboards), Rick Joudrey (bass), Owen Tennyson (drums), Kevin Breit (guitars), and Jim MacDonald (keyboards).

Shortly after filming a cameo in the film Crazy Moon (to which they contributed two songs), Howe placed the band on "indefinite hiatus" in February 1986. However, continued interest in the band, particularly in Europe, resulted in Cold War Night Life being reissued on compact disc in 1997. This in turn led to a 1997 reunion concert with Howe and Vorn in Lund, Sweden.

In 1999, Rational Youth, with a new lineup of original frontman Howe and new keyboard players Jean-Claude Cutz and Dave Rout, released its first album after fourteen years, To the Goddess Electricity. Cutz and Rout had been members of techno-industrial band Digital Poodle.

Rational Youth toured throughout Scandinavia over the next two years, playing its final concert on November 3, 2001, at the Tinitus Festival in Stockholm, Sweden.

Original members Tracy Howe and Bill Vorn came together again in 2009, at the initiative of Marc Demouy, recording a new version of their 1982 track "Dancing On The Berlin Wall" in honour of the twentieth anniversary of the fall of the Wall. In 2010, the recording was issued by YUL Records as a CD EP. In 2011, another CD EP was released, City Of Night /Cite Phosphore, consisting of re-recordings of an early single, as well as remixed versions of the original recording.

Later that year, Kevin Komoda rejoined, thus reuniting the Cold War Night Life Rational Youth trio. This trio issued yet another re-recorded single, the CD EP Coboloid Race/I Want To See The Light 30th Anniversary Edition. The release included newly re-recorded songs and newly discovered alternative mixes from the original 1981 sessions.

In 2013, the band issued a number of archival recordings, including live material recorded in Ottawa and Winnipeg in 1983. A rarities compilation called Magic Box was also released, which consisted of early 1980s Rational Youth demos and remixes, and solo recordings from Howe, Vorn and Komoda.

In 2014, the band did a few shows as a six piece, featuring Tracy Howe on vocals and synth, Kevin Komoda on synths, Brian Arsenault on synths, Scott Cameron on bass, Paul Grainville on drums, backing vocals, Gaenor Howe on electronic percussion, theremin, backing vocals. This lineup played in Montreal on January 10, Ottawa on January 18, and four shows in Scandinavia in April and May 2014, billed together with the band Psyche. In November 2014, Rational Youth paired with Psyche to record and issue a cover of AC/DC's "Thunderstruck", a collaborative single that credited both bands.

In May 2016, Rational Youth (now a two-piece with Tracy and Gaenor Howe) released the EP Future Past Tense through Artoffact Records.

In September 2016, the band appeared on the compilation, Heresy, released by Cold War Night Life. A play on the title of Heredity, Heresy also featured covers of Rational Youth tracks by eighteen artists from Canada, Norway, Britain, Sweden, and Germany. Contributions included recordings by former band members, Dave Rout and Kevin Komoda, as well as collaborators Psyche.

In 2019, Cold War Night Life was re-released in deluxe 2-LP and CD formats by Universal Music Canada.

In early 2020, Rational Youth undertook their final live performances, with Canadian shows alongside UK band China Crisis and a tour of Mexico, with a final performance in Mexico City on 7 March 2020, as the COVID-19 pandemic began to take hold, affecting many aspects of normal life, not the least of which were international travel and live music globally.

In 2021, to mark the 40th anniversary of Rational Youth's founding, the band released the EP Wavelength on their Donkeyland label. Three of the EPs four tracks were re-recordings of songs from their self-titled EP of 1983.

== Discography ==
=== Albums ===
==== Studio albums ====
- Cold War Night Life (1982)
- Rational Youth (EP) (1983)
- Heredity (1985)
- To the Goddess Electricity (1999)
- Future Past Tense (EP) (2016)
- Wavelength (EP) (2021)

==== Live albums ====
- Live 1983 (2013)

==== Compilations ====
- Total Rational! (unauthorised Dutch compilation, 1994)
- All Our Saturdays (1981-1986) (compilation, 1999)
- Early Singles (CD box, 2000)
- The 20th Anniversary Collection (compilation, 2001)
- Magic Box (rarities and demos compilation, 2013)
- Recordings 1981-84 (5-LP vinyl box set, 2014)

=== Singles ===
- "I Want to See the Light/Coboloid Race" (12", 1981)
- "Cité Phosphore" (7", 1982)
- "City of Night" (12", 1982)
- "Saturdays in Silesia" (7"/12", 1982)
- "In Your Eyes" (7"/12", 1983)
- "Dancing on the Berlin Wall" (Dutch 12", 1984; unauthorised extended edit)
- "No More and No Less" (7"/12", 1985) - No. 87 RPM
- "Call Me" (7"/12", 1985) - No. 89 RPM
- "Bang On" (7"/12", 1985) - No. 91 RPM
- "Malade" (7", 1985)
- 3 Remixes for the New Cold War (EP, 1998)
- "Everything Is Vapour/Money and Blood" (CD single, 1999)
- "Dancing on the Berlin Wall" (CD single, 2010)
- "City of Night"/"Cite Phosphore" (CD single, 2011)
- "Coboloid Race"/"I Want to See the Light" (30th Anniversary Edition) (CD single, 2011)
- "Thunderstruck" - Rational Youth & Psyche (7" single, 2014)
