= Stephen Huss (musician) =

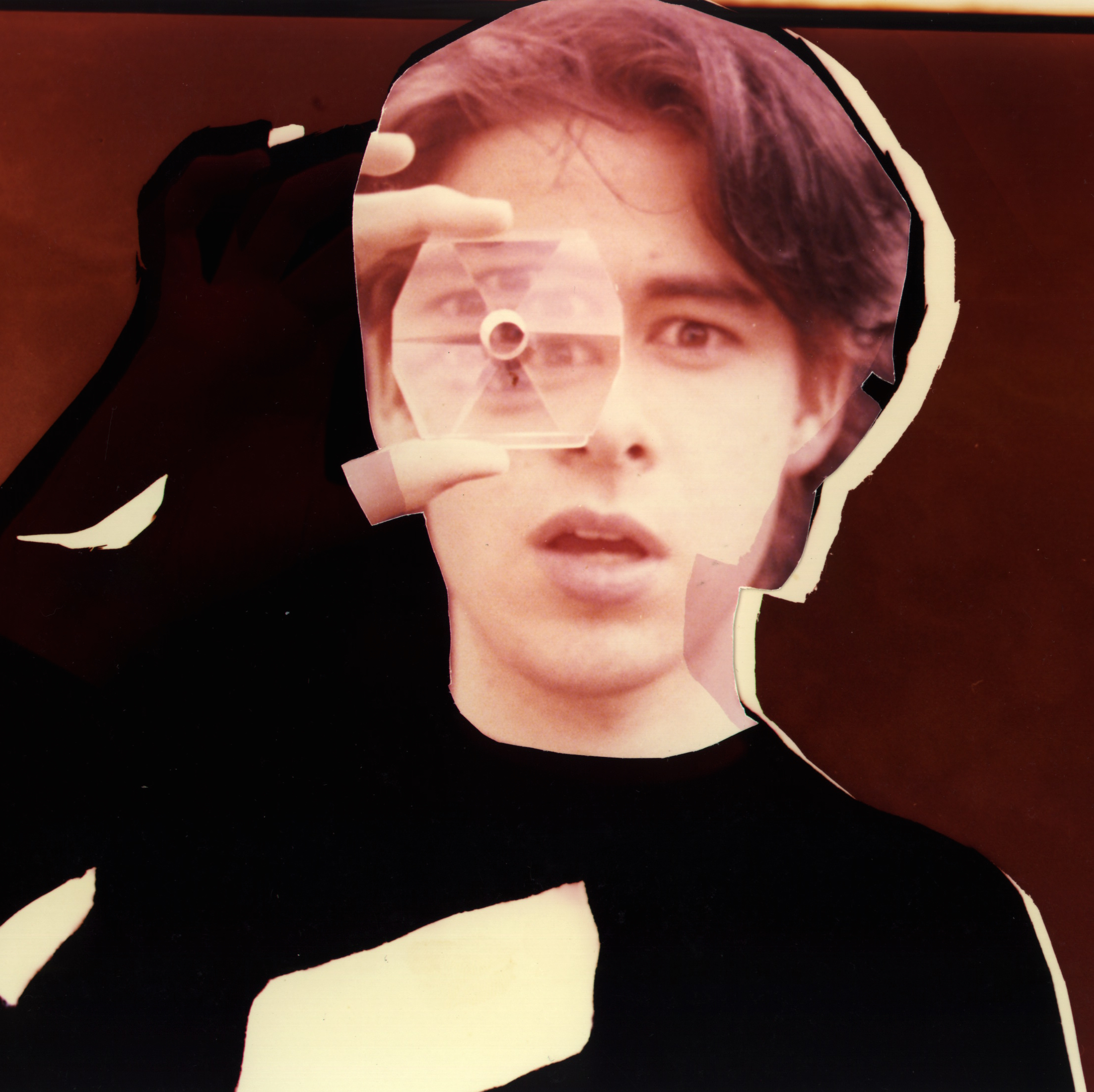

Background information
- Born: August 19, 1967
- Origin: Canada
- Died: August 2, 2015 (aged 47); Waterloo, Ontario
- Genres: Synthpop Electronic Music
- Occupation: Musician
- Instrument: Synthesizer
- Years active: 1980s–2015
- Formerly of: Psyche

Stephen Huss (August 19, 1967 – August 2, 2015) was a founding member of the Canadian dark synthpop band Psyche.

== Early life ==
Huss was born in Cooksville, Ontario, and grew up in Kitchener, Ontario. When he was a teenager his family moved to Edmonton, Alberta.

== Career ==
Huss, with his brother Darrin, formed the duo Psyche in 1981 in Edmonton. The brothers began performing locally with keyboardist Dwayne Goettel. Some of their early material was recorded, and later released as the album Re-Membering Dwayne.

After Goettel left the group, the brothers self-released an album 'Insomnia Theatre', in 1985; the album sold well in Europe.

Huss was unable to continue in live performance after 1989 due to his ongoing struggle with schizophrenia. While living in Waterloo, Ontario, he continued recording with the band into the early 1990s, after Darrin had relocated to Germany, but discontinued songwriting with the band after the release of "Intimacy" in 1994. He kept a relatively low profile since that time, but released three solo albums in the 2000s followed by a fourth, posthumously released by his brother on what would have been his 48th birthday.

== Solo discography ==
Huss has released six largely instrumental solo albums. The second album, Lost Oasis, features guest vocals on "Conjure" by his brother Darrin Huss. "Notes Of A Lifetime" also features a demo entitled "For Another Day" that was recorded by the two brothers in 1999 to develop future Psyche songs in the original lineup. "Life Force" was released to celebrate what would have been his 50th birthday. The music was recorded on CD and cassette between 2006 and 2011. Compiled, edited and mastered by his brother Darrin, it was released in August 2017 on several digital download sites. The compilation "Infinity Sign" continued the posthumous release cycle on August 19, 2018, with a collection of highlights. 2020 saw a return of new releases made available digitally from archival recordings with the album entitled Stranger Things. A vinyl release under the name Galaxy compiled 6 tracks for Artificial Dance Records out of the Netherlands and was also released at the end of 2020. On August 19, 2021, a newly discovered track entitled Chiller Wave was released on all streaming outlets. A video was created to promote this release. The "Unknown Voices" EP followed on August 26.

- Void Logic (2004)
- Lost Oasis (2006)
- Alien Tango (2009)
- Moonlife (2015)
- Notes Of A Lifetime (2016)
- Life Force (2017)
- Infinity Sign (2018)
- Stranger Things (2020)
- Galaxy (2020)
- Unknown Voices (2021)
