= Natalia Villaveces =

- Born: Natalia Villaveces; April 2, 1979 (age 47); Colombia
- Modeling information
- Height: 5 ft 3 in (1.60 m)
- Hair color: brown
- Eye color: brown

Natalia Villaveces (born April 2, 1979) is a Colombian actor, TV host, producer, and writer.

== Early career ==
For more than 8 years, Natalia was the general producer for "Nitido", an entertainment program airing nationally on Telemundo Network. She also was a correspondent for the network's flagship news magazine show "Al Rojo Vivo con Maria Celeste" and has co-hosted televised red carpet events for prestigious specials like the Latin Billboard Awards.

== Television ==
Natalia's television career started at a very young age in her native Colombia where she was cast on several popular TV shows such as "Imaginate" (Imagine) and Pequeños Gigantes (Little Giants). She also had smaller roles in soap operas such as "Betty La Fea" (Betty the Ugly One) and "La Baby Sister" (The Baby Sister). She set her sights on the U.S. Hispanic market and participated in the first ever Spanish-language reality show titled "Protagonistas de Novela" (Soap Opera Protagonists). Her involvement in the show caught the attention of Telemundo executives and she was given her first big break as co-host of the wildly popular "Cotorreando" (Gossiping), an entertainment show that provided audiences with the latest celebrity news and gossip. Shortly thereafter, she was given her own show, which she continues to work on today.

== Literary career and animal rights activism ==
In addition to her TV career, Natalia has also written numerous poems and a theatrical play for children titled "Amor y Porcelana" (Love and Porcelain). She volunteers with national and local animal rescue organizations and raising awareness for the plight of animals around the world. Natalia promoted vegetarianism in a PETA ad campaign.

== Works ==
In 2008, Natalia published a book entitled Pescando Estrellas. She is an active blogger who maintains blogs like Blog de Natalia Villaveces (2010–present) and Blog Yahoo Mujer Onda Verde (2011–present).

== Hosting and production ==
- Nitido (2004–present)
- Fiebre de Corona (2005)
- Musicalisimo (2009–Present)

== Reporter ==
- Al rojo vivo con María Celeste (2011)

As herself

- Billboard Extra (2011)
- Al rojo vivo con María Celeste (1 episode, 2007)
- 2011 Billboard Latin Music Awards (2009)
- 2005 Billboard Latin Music Awards (2005)
- 2004 Billboard Latin Music Awards (2004)
- 2003 Billboard Music Awards (2003)
- 2002 Billboard Music Awards (2002)
- Protagonistas de novela (1 episode, 2002)
