= Rómulo Campuzano =

Mexican politician

- Born: 8 January 1957 (age 69); Durango, Durango, Mexico
- Occupation: Politician
- Political party: PAN

Rómulo de Jesús Campuzano González (born 8 January 1957) is a Mexican politician affiliated with the National Action Party. As of 2014 he served as Senator of the LVIII and LIX Legislatures of the Mexican Congress representing Durango.

On July 31, 2018, he was one of the passengers aboard Aeromexico Flight 2431 that day when it crashed on takeoff from Durango International Airport on a flight bound for Mexico City; he sustained minor injuries as a result of the accident, in which all passengers and crew members survived.
