= To the Goddess Electricity =

Studio album by Rational Youth
- Released: October 4, 1999
- Recorded: 1998–99, Elerat and Athletic Studios, Toronto
- Genre: Synthpop
- Length: 42:36
- Label: October Records
- Producer: Rational Youth

Rational Youth chronology
Everything Is Vapour/Money and Blood (1990)	To the Goddess Electricity (1999)	Early Singles (box) (2000)

Professional ratings
Review scores
Source	Rating
AllMusic	4/5 stars
Release Music Magazine	7/10 stars

To the Goddess Electricity was Rational Youth's 1999 comeback album.

== Track listing ==
Original 1999 CD
No.	Title	Writer(s)	Length
1.	"Ludwigshafen"	Tracy Howe, Jean-Claude Cutz	4:34
2.	"Pink Pills, Orange Pills"	Howe, Cutz	4:52
3.	"Money And Blood"	Howe, Cutz, Dave Rout	5:04
4.	"Energie"	Howe, Cutz, Rout	3:36
5.	"Back From Madrapour"	Howe, Cutz	4:13
6.	"Talk To Me (I'm Only Human)"	Howe, Cutz	3:48
7.	"In My Imagination"	Howe, Cutz	3:36
8.	"To The Goddess Electricity"	Howe, Cutz	2:35
9.	"Everything Is Vapour"	Howe, Cutz, Rout	3:39
10.	"The Ghosts Of Montreal"	Howe, Rout	3:28
11.	"Open Your Heart"	Howe, Cutz, Rout	3:11

To the Goddess Electricity was reissued in 2014 in a heavily revised version. The track order was changed, several selections appeared in substantially different mixes and arrangements (marked †), and two bonus tracks were added (marked ‡).

Reissued 2014 CD and LP
No.	Title	Writer(s)	Length
1.	"Everything Is Vapour†"	Howe, Cutz, Rout	4:16
2.	"Pink Pills, Orange Pills†"	Howe, Cutz	4:30
3.	"Back From Madrapour"	Howe, Cutz	4:14
4.	"Ludwigshafen"	Howe, Cutz	4:33
5.	"In My Imagination"	Howe, Cutz	3:35
6.	"To The Goddess Electricity†"	Howe, Cutz	3:31
7.	"Money And Blood"	Howe, Cutz, Rout	5:05
8.	"The Ghosts Of Montreal"	Howe, Rout	3:27
9.	"Energie"	Howe, Cutz, Rout	3:33
10.	"Talk To Me (I'm Only Human)"	Howe, Cutz	3:47
11.	"Open Your Heart"	Howe, Cutz, Rout	3:08
12.	"You Saved Me (No More And No Less)‡"	Howe	4:01
13.	"Everything Is Vapour (Rain Version)‡"	Howe, Cutz, Rout	4:17

== Personnel ==
- Tracy Howe – vocals, synthesizers
- Jean-Claude Cutz – synthesizers
- Dave Rout – synthesizers
- Annabella – backing vocals
- Trish Fitzpatrick – backing vocals
