= Rational Youth (EP) =

EP by Rational Youth
- Released: August 1983
- Recorded: 1983
- Genre: Synthpop
- Length: 19 min 28 sec
- Label: Capitol
- Producer: Pat Deserio

Rational Youth chronology
In Your Eyes (1983)	Rational Youth (1983)	Heredity (1985)

Professional ratings
Review scores
Source	Rating
AllMusic	link

Rational Youth was the eponymous EP by Rational Youth, and the band's first release under their Capitol contract. It was released on CD in 2000 as part of the Early Singles box.

== Track listing ==
1. "In Your Eyes" - 2:53
2. "Just a Sound in the Night" - 3:48
3. "Latin Lovers" - 3:54
4. "Holiday in Bangkok" - 5:28
5. "The Man in Grey" - 3:24

== Personnel ==
- Tracy Howe - vocals, synthesizers
- Denis Duran - bass
- Kevin Akira Komoda - keyboards
- Angel Calvo - drums, percussion

Special Guests

- Roman Martyn - guitars
- Bill Vorn - synthesizer programming on "Holiday in Bangkok"
- Joel Zifkin - violin on "Holiday in Bangkok"
