= Everything Is Vapour/Money and Blood =

"Everything is Vapour/Money and Blood"

Single by Rational Youth

from the album To The Goddess Electricity
- Released: 7 June 1999
- Recorded: 1998–99
- Genre: Synthpop
- Length: 20:27
- Label: October Records
- Producer(s): Rational Youth

Professional ratings
Review scores
Source	Rating
AllMusic	2/5 stars

"Everything Is Vapour/Money and Blood" is a single by Canadian band Rational Youth, released in 1999. It was the only single from their 1999 album To the Goddess Electricity, and the first of entirely new material from the band since 1986.

== Track listing ==
1. "Everything Is Vapour" – 4:17
2. "Money and Blood Part 2" – 3:52
3. "Everything Is Vapour (Money and Blood Mix)" [remixed by DIN] – 6:03
4. "Everything Is Vapour (In the Moment Mix)" [remixed by Will Skol of Transformantra] – 6:16

== Personnel ==
- Tracy Howe - vocals, synthesizers
- Jean-Claude Cutz - synthesizers
- Dave Rout - synthesizers
