= The 20th Anniversary Collection =

Greatest hits album by Rational Youth
- Released: 2001
- Recorded: 1981–2001
- Genre: Synthpop
- Length: 57:53
- Label: MP3.com
- Producer: Rational Youth, Pyer Desrocher, Pat Deserio

Rational Youth chronology
The 20th Anniversary Collection (2001)	20th Anniversary Collection (2001)

The 20th Anniversary Collection is a 2001 compilation CD by the Canadian new wave synth-pop band Rational Youth, released (as suggested by the title) to commemorate its 20th anniversary. It was their final release, followed by the group's breakup in February 2002.

== Track listing ==
1. "Coboloid Race" (Tracy Howe, Bill Vorn) - 4:30
2. "Everything Is Vapour (Rain)" - (Howe, Jean-Claude Cutz) 4:20
3. "Saturdays in Silesia" (Howe, Vorn) - 4:06
4. "Pink Pills, Orange Pills" - 4:24
5. "Dancing on the Berlin Wall" (Howe, Vorn) - 4:34
6. "Hot Streets" (Howe, Kevin Komoda) - 3:05
7. "In Your Eyes" (Howe, Komoda) - 2:54
8. "The Man in Grey" (Howe) - 3:24
9. "Money and Blood, Pt. 2" - 3:52
10. "I Want to See the Light" (Howe, Vorn) - 3:44
11. "City of Night (Danse Mix)" (Howe, Vorn, Babette Duran) - 7:10
12. "Holiday in Bangkok (live in Helsingborg 1998)" (Howe) - 5:10
13. "Close to Nature (DIN & Infor/Mental remix)" (Howe, Vorn) - 6:40

== Personnel ==
- Tracy Howe - vocals, synthesizers
- Bill Vorn - synthesizers, vocoder, programming
- Kevin Komoda - synthesizer, keyboard
- Angel Calvo - drums, percussion
- Denis Duran - bass guitar
- Jean-Claude Cutz - synthesizer
- Dave Rout - synthesizer
