= Cold War Night Life =

Studio album by Rational Youth
- Released: March 1982
- Recorded: 1981–1982
- Genre: New wave; synth-pop
- Length: 47:54
- Label: YUL Records
- Producer: Pat Deserio

Rational Youth chronology
Cité Phosphore (1982)	Cold War Night Life (1982)	City of Night (1982)

Professional ratings
Review scores
Source	Rating
AllMusic	(4.5/5)

Cold War Night Life is the 1982 debut album by Rational Youth, containing their most well known song, "Saturdays in Silesia". Long out of print, it was re-released by EMI on CD in 1997 after an e-mail campaign by fans. It was subsequently re-released by Universal Music in 2019.

The online magazine and record label, Cold War Night Life, was named after the album. In 2017, it released a tribute album, Heresy, that featured a number of tracks from Cold War Night Life performed by electronic artists from Canada, Germany, Australia, Sweden, Norway and the UK.

In 2019, Cold War Night Life was re-released in deluxe 2-LP and CD formats by Universal Music Canada.

== Track listing ==
Original 1982 LP
No.	Title	Writer(s)	Length
1.	"Close to Nature"	Tracy Howe, Bill Vorn	4:41
2.	"Beware the Fly"	Howe, Vorn	4:04
3.	"Saturdays in Silesia"	Howe, Vorn	4:21
4.	"Just a Sound in the Night"	Howe, Vorn	5:08
5.	"Le Meilleur Des Mondes"	Howe, Vorn	3:14
6.	"Ring the Bells"	Howe, Vorn	5:14
7.	"City of Night"	Howe, Vorn, Babette Duran	4:03
8.	"Dancing on the Berlin Wall"	Howe, Vorn	4:34

=== Additional tracks ===
Bonus tracks on initial 1997 CD version
No.	Title	Writer(s)	Length
9.	"Power Zone"	Howe, Vorn	3:39
10.	"I Want to See the Light"	Howe, Vorn	3:42
11.	"Coboloid Race"	Howe, Vorn	5:19

Bonus tracks on 2019 CD/LP reissue
No.	Title	Writer(s)	Length
9.	"Power Zone"	Howe, Vorn	3:39
10.	"Coboloid Race"	Howe, Vorn	5:18
11.	"Cité Phosphore"	Howe, Vorn, Duran	4:01
12.	"Saturdays in Silesia (Extended Version)"	Howe, Vorn	7:17
13.	"City of Night (Danse Mix)"	Howe, Vorn, Duran	7:11
14.	"I Want to See the Light"	Howe, Vorn	3:42

== Personnel ==
- Tracy Howe - vocals, synthesizers
- Bill Vorn - synthesizers, vocoder, programming
- Kevin Komoda - synthesizers
- Mario Spezza - synthesizers on "I Want to See the Light" and "Coboloid Race"
