= Indhira Serrano =

Colombian actress and model (born 1976)

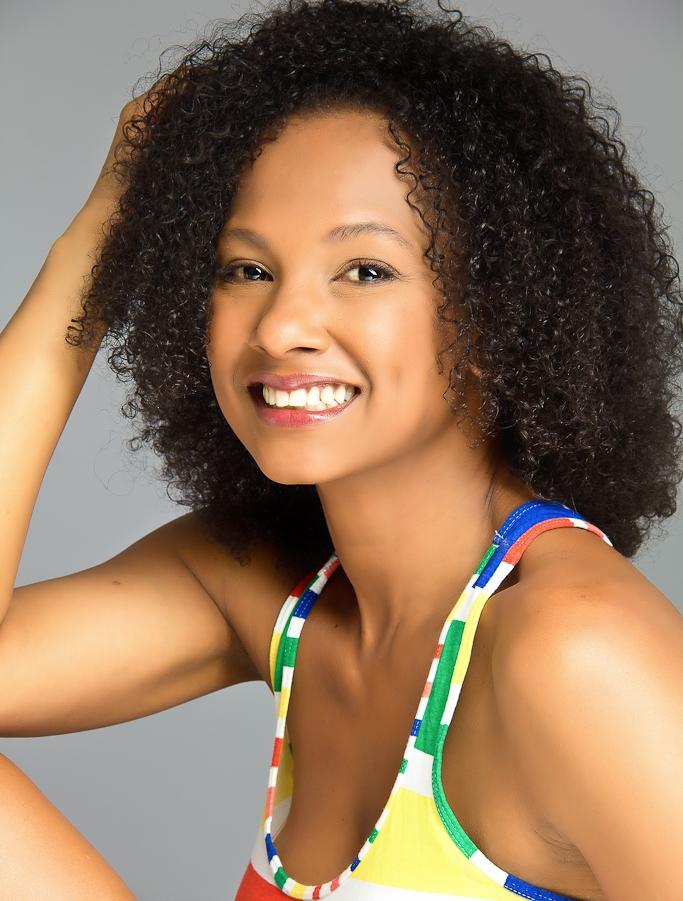
- Serrano in 2012
- Born: Indhira Rosa Serrano Redondo; 27 January 1976 (age 50); Barranquilla, Atlántico, Colombia
- Occupations: Actress, model
- Website: indhiraserrano.com

Indhira Rosa Serrano Redondo (born 27 January 1976)) is a Colombian actress and model.

She has appeared in several telenovelas on Telemundo, including La Traición and El clon.

== Selected filmography ==
=== Film ===
List of film appearances, with year, title, and role shown
Year	Title	Role	Notes
2007	Love in the Time of Cholera	Dr. Barbara Lynch	
2008	Paraíso Travel	Madame Taylor	

=== Television ===
List of television appearances, with year, title, and role shown
Year	Title	Role	Notes
2004	Todos quieren con Marilyn	Onix	1 episode
2006	La hija del mariachi	Carmen Román	1 episode
2007	Decisiones		
2008	La traición	Ursula	1 episode
2009	Niños Ricos, Pobres Padres	Monica's lover	1 episode
2009	Victorinos	Yesenia Cadavid	18 episodes
2010	El clon	Dora Encarnación Padilla	156 episodes
2011	Flor Salvaje	Olguita	1 episode
2011	A corazón abierto	Comisaria	
2011	Tres Milagros	Visitación "Madonna" de Cruz	1 episode
2011	La Traicionera	Cristina Torres	1 episode
2015	Celia	Myrelys Bocanegra	2 episodes
2017	El Comandante		6 episodes
2017	Pambelé	Ceferina Reyes	
2019	Always a Witch	Dr. Luisa	1 episode
