= Daniella Donado =

Colombian actress, presenter, and model

- Born: Barranquilla, Atlantico, Colombia
- Occupations: Presenter, actress and model
- Years active: 2007–present

Daniella Donado Visbal is a Colombian actress, television presenter, and model, known for her roles in Colombian television series.

== Career ==
Donado achieved notability in her native country by being crowned queen of the Barranquilla Carnival in 2007. Immediately afterward she began a career as an actress, appearing in television series such as Oye bonita, Tierra de cantores, La Madame, Los protegidos, Pambelé, and La selección. She also participated in the reality show Desafío 2014: Morocco, The Thousand and One Nights and worked as a presenter for the Telecaribe television channel. In 2015, she received a nomination for the Novelas Awards in the category of best supporting actress in a telenovela for her participation in A Dream Called Salsa. In 2020, she was linked to the Telecaribe Breicok channel project, a television series that began its transmission on the regional channel on May 4.

== Filmography ==
=== Television ===
- Breicok (2020) – Vanessa Arango
- Today is the Day (2017) – (Presenter)
- Pambelé (2017)
- A Dream Called Salsa (2014) – Natalia
- La Madame (2013)
- The Selection (2013) – Daniela Castro
- Land of Singers (2010)
- Hey Pretty (2008)
- The Protected (2008)

=== Reality ===
- Challenge 2014: Morocco, The Thousand and One Nights
