= Cuando quiero llorar no lloro (TV series) =

- Created by: Carlos Duplat Sanjuan; Luz Mariela Santofimio (Script); Miguel Otero Silva (original novel)
- Developed by: R.T.I.
- Directed by: Carlos Duplat Sanjuan
- Starring: Ramiro Meneses; Ricardo Gomez; David Guerrero; Maribel Abello; Edgardo Roman; Adelaida Otalora; Alexandra Restrepo
- Theme music composer: Cesar Zambrano
- Opening theme: Victorinos
- Country of origin: Colombia
- Original language: Spanish
- No. of episodes: 13

Production
- Producer: Carlos Duplat Sanjuan
- Production location: Bogotá
- Camera setup: Multi-camera
- Running time: 42 minutes

Original release
- Network: Cadena 2 (first 9 episodes); Cadena 1 (last 4 episodes)
- Release: April 28 – August 18, 1991

Related
- Castigo Divino; No Salgas esta noche; Victorinos; 3 Milagros

Cuando quiero llorar no lloro (also known as Los Victorinos) was a Spanish language TV series produced by Colombia's R.T.I. It debuted in April 1991 and concluded in August 1991. It was the subject of much controversy at the time was a huge success which inspired two remakes; Victorinos (2009) produced also by R.T.I for Telemundo and Tres Milagros (2011) produced by Teleset for RCN TV.

It is based on the 1970 novel of the same name by Miguel Otero Silva.

== Plot ==
In 1963, a renowned mentalist named Norman Reinhart (Omar Sanchez) visits Colombia where his mental powers are broadcast through the radio and television. Two upper-class women, Sara Koppel of Umaña (Maribel Abello) and her aunt Rosalia Koppel (Margalida Castro) attend the show. The mentalist announces that Sara is pregnant and her unborn child will be named Victorino. He will be born on the same date and hour with other two babies also called Victorino, with whom he will share a deadly curse: The day that Victorino finds another Victorino and another Victorino, Victorino dies. During the same session the seer also foresees that the President of United States of America John F. Kennedy would be killed.

Sara does not believe in the prophecy but then discovers she is pregnant and, on November 2 of 1963, she gives birth prematurely to her only son Victorino Umaña Koppel in an elegant clinic in Bogotá, after her husband Rodrigo is discovered travelling with a lover in a phony job travel. The child is baptized by his grandparents Juan (Carlos Duplat) and Julia. Sara is terrified upon realizing that she has given her son the name prophesied by Reinhart.

Meanwhile in a public hospital of the same city Victorino Perdomo Rangel is born of Romulo Perdomo (Edgardo Román), a humble barber and an ANAPO party member, and Amparo Rangel (Patricia Grisales), a housewife. The Perdomo family has two girls, Carola and Maria Eugenia, named after the wife and daughter of President Gustavo Rojas Pinilla, respectively. Coincidentally Amparo is one of the people present during the show where Reinhart uttered the prophecy.

Simultaneously Victorino Moya is born in a hovel in the hills around the city. Rubelia (Adelaida Otalora), his mother, is a maid employed by the Umaña-Koppel family. Ceferino (Alejandro Muñoz), Victorino's father, left his family to seek his fortune in the eastern plains and then Rubelia married Facundo (Álvaro Rodriguez), a worker who beats her when he's drunk and with whom she has two more children, Mireya and Guillermo.

Over the years, the three Victorinos live in a completely different reality, each with his own family.

The wealthy and handsome Victorino Umaña (David Guerrero) studies in the best schools and graduates from the best university, travelling the world, going from one party to another party and wasting money on luxuries together with his best friend Juan Andres Alzate 'Juancho' (Andrés Marulanda) and his cousin Ana Maria Londoño Koppel (Alexandra Restrepo). Although his mother Sara, has zealously guarded the prophecy of Reinhart, Victorino resorts to Edmundo (Waldo Urrego), a leading senator and his mother's boyfriend, to look for his two namesake, but unsuccessfully. A typical rich kid, Victorino gets into trouble and scandals, marries his cousin Ana Maria, who is unfaithful to him with his friend 'Juancho' Alzate and, through him, starts doing business with 'The Southerner', a drug trafficker who has a pilot named Daniel Schumacher, who becomes their intermediary.

Since his childhood, Victorino Perdomo (Ricardo Gómez) has great art activities, and is admitted into a seminary because his father does not have money to pay a private school. There he meets a seminary priest named Augustine Lajarreta (Luis Fernando Montoya) who becomes his mentor. After misunderstandings, scandals and a nonconformist attitude, he is expelled from the seminary while his father is sent to prison for political reasons. Years later, Victorino comes to the National University to study architecture. There he gets in touch with leftist ideals and meets Maria Helena aka 'Rosana' (Maria Fernanda Martínez), who talks him into joining a guerrilla group called 'Popular Defence'.

Victorino Moya (Ramiro Meneses) does not have the same opportunities as his namesakes. He leads a life of crime together with his best friend 'The Black' (Ulises Colmenares). Victorino cannot cope with the mistreatment and abuse that his stepfather Facundo inflicts on his mother and his sister Mireya, so he murders him with a stolen gun. As a teenager he joins the 'Carroloco' and 'The Black' gangs. As adults, Victorino and his friend join a criminal group led by 'The Goose', 'The Blind' (Jorge Herrera) and 'Rapidol' (Horacio Tavera), the latter being a neighbour and friend of theirs. After robbing a bank and having a party to celebrate the coup leaders, Victorino receives the order to kill 'The Black' as proof of loyalty, but Victorino refuses and, when soon after 'The Black' is killed, Victorino makes his bosses believe that he did away with him. After trying to kill Schumacher, Victorino is arrested. In jail he meets his father Ceferino who helps him survive and, then, to escape from jail. Due to a money problem, his bosses order him to assassinate Schumacher.

In 1983, when the three Victorinos become of age, the fatal encounter occurs. Victorino Umaña, accompanied by 'Juancho' and Schumacher, head to Korean Bank to negotiate with the manager a loan to cover the loss he suffered in a Mexican drug shipment. Coincidentally Victorino Perdomo arrives at the bank accompanied by his guerrilla comrades to rob the bank, while also Victorino Moya appears with the task of killing Schumacher. Once in the bank there is a shootout between the guerrillas and the guards of the bank, in which Victorino Perdomo, Schumacher and 'Juancho' and other bank customers die. Victorino Moya is mortally wounded and flees the scene but bleeds to death shortly before arriving home. Victorino Umana remains unharmed and is interrogated by the police, when he denies that Schumacher had met his now dead namesake (whom he knew and had tried to meet). When Victorino Umaña returns home. He tells Ana Maria that 'Juancho' died in the shootout and implores her in tears to flee since they are bankrupt and deeply indebted. She is furious and tells him that she loved 'Juancho', admitting that she had been unfaithful to her husband with him. She goes on saying that she has never loved him either, and they were together only because their families almost forced them to since they were kids, but his sole presence was causing her disgust. Eventually she leaves. Victorino bursts into tears and, disillusioned, takes a Walther PPK that Schumacher had given her and commits suicide by shooting himself in the mouth, in the precise moment when Ana Maria returns apparently regretting what she has said, but too late to prevent the tragedy.

The funerals of the three Victorinos take place in the Central Cemetery of Bogotá, without any of the families of the deceased aware of what has happened to the others. Victorino Umaña is buried in a luxurious mausoleum. Victorino Perdomo is buried in a vault with several hooded guerrillas shooting in salute. Victorino Moya is buried in the poorest section of the cemetery. At the end, the three mothers bump into one another at the entrance of the cemetery.

== Controversy ==
The series had high rates of rating though full of criticism from experts and viewers for its explicit scenes of sex and violence. After two months, with 9 episodes aired, the National Television Commission ordered its cancellation for 4 months beginning on April 30, 1991. After protests from viewers and fans of the series, allowed this continue on July 28 of the same year but on a schedule suitable for thematic more, as of 21:45 UTC-05 22:45. The last episode aired on August 18, 1991.

== Cast ==
- David Guerrero.... Victorino Umaña (Upper class)
- Ricardo Gómez.... Victorino Perdomo (Middle Class)
- Ramiro Meneses.... Victorino Moya (Low Class)
- Jorge Emilio Salazar (R.I.P.)....Rodrigo Umaña (father of rich Victorino)
- Maribel Abello.... Sara 'Sarita' Koppel (Mother of rich Victorino)
- Edgardo Román.... Romulo Perdomo (Father of middle class Victorino)
- Patricia Grisales.... Amparo Rangel (Mother of middle class Victorino)
- Carlos Duplat.... Juan Koppel (Victorino Umana's grandfather)
- Adelaida Otálora.... Rubelia Moya (Mother of poor Victorino)
- Alejandro Muñoz.... Ceferino (Father of poor Victorino)
- Álvaro Rodriguez.... Facundo (Stepfather of poor Victorino)
- Alexandra Restrepo.... Ana Maria Londono Koppel (cousin and wife of Victorino Umana)
- Andrés Marulanda.... Juan Andrés Alzate Santos 'Juancho' (Best friend of Victorino Umana)
- Ulises Colmenares.... El Negro (The Black) (Best friend of Victorino Moya)
- Horacio Tavera.... 'Rapidol' (friend of Victorino Moya)
- Maria Fernanda Martinez.... Maria Helena 'Rosana' (Girlfriend of Victorino Perdomo)
- Luis Fernando Montoya.... Priest Agustín Lajarreta (mentor of Victorino Perdomo)
- Jorge Herrera.... EL Ciego (The Blind) (Boss of Victorino Moya)
