= Juan David Agudelo =

Colombian actor, TV host and model

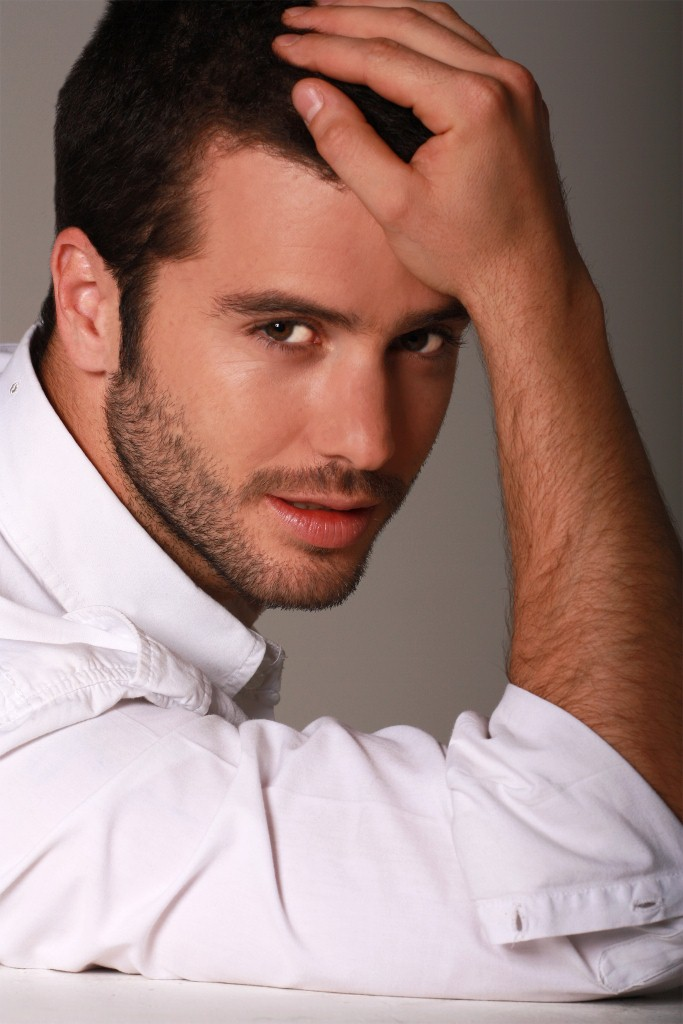
- Born: Juan David Agudelo; 11 January 1982 (age 44); Bogotá, Colombia
- Occupations: Actor, TV Host, Model

Juan David Agudelo (born 11 January 1982) is a Colombian actor, TV host and model.

== Career ==
Juan David started his acting career in 2008 in the Colombian TV Series "Padres e Hijos" produced by Colombiana de T.V.

In 2009 he gained international recognition for his work in the Soap Opera "Niños Ricos, pobres padres" co-produced by Telemundo and RTI.

In 2010 he worked in "El Clon" for Telemundo and participates in "La reina del Sur".

== Filmography ==
=== Television ===
- Primera dama (2011) – Diego Santander
- Terapia de pareja (2011) – Pablo (young)
- Tu voz estéreo (2011) (Episode "Gigolo a domicilio")
- Mujeres al límite (2010) – Novicio Santiago
- Decisiones (2010) (Episode "Yo la mato")
- El Clon (2010) – Fernando Escobar
- Karabudjan (2010) (Antena 3)
- Victorinos (2010) – Jonathan
- Niños Ricos, Pobres Padres (2009) – Juan Alarcón
- Café con aroma de mujer (2021) – Bernardo Vallejo

=== Movies ===
- Papa Rebelde – (2016) – Jorge Mario Bergoglio
- Límites – (2008) – Felipe
