= 5 viudas sueltas =

Colombian telenovela series

- Also known as: Five Widows Loose
- Genre: Telenovela
- Created by: Juana Uribe
- Written by: Mónica Palacio
- Directed by: Ricardo Coral; Luis Alberto Restrep
- Starring: Coraima Torres; Ernesto Benjumea; Heidy Bermúdez; Diego Cadavid; Angélica Blandón; Carlota Llano; César Mora
- Country of origin: Colombia
- Original language: Spanish
- No. of episodes: 149

Production
- Executive producer: Juan Andrés Flórez
- Producer: Manuel Peñalosa
- Production location: Bogotá
- Cinematography: Rafael Puentes; Freddy Castro Uribe
- Editor: Juan Pablo Serna
- Running time: 60 minutes
- Production companies: Caracol Televisión; Sony Pictures Television

Original release
- Network: Caracol Televisión
- Release: May 27, 2013 – January 10, 2014

5 viudas sueltas (English title: Five Widows Loose) is a Colombian telenovela produced and broadcast by Caracol Televisión, with co-production of Sony Pictures Television, starring Coraima Torres, Angélica Blandón, Heidy Bermúdez, Luly Bossa, Andrea Gómez, Diego Cadavid, Ricardo Leguizamo, Ernesto Benjumea and Rodolfo Valdez. It premiered on Caracol Televisión on May 27, 2013 and concluded on January 10, 2014.

== Cast ==
- Coraima Torres as Virginia Mazuera
- Heidy Bermúdez as Yidis León
- Angélica Blandón as Luisa Bustos
- Luly Bossa as Samantha Palacio
- Andrea Gómez as Marianela Campuzano
- Diego Cadavid as Robin Ruíz
- Ernesto Benjumea as Benjamin Ferreira
- Ricardo Leguízamo as Jacobo Arias
- Andoni Ferreño as Dr. Melguizo
- Rodolfo Valdéz as Marcelo Ríos
- Claudia Moreno as Leticia "Lety"
- César Mora as Luis
- Armando Gutiérrez as Lobo Guerrero
- Carlos Duplat as Pedro Juan Mazuera
- Noelle Schonwald as Patricia Nieto
- Adriana Silva as Carminia
- Patricia Polanco as Vilma
- Ana Medina as Zaira
- Víctor Gómez as the engineer
- Juan Carlos Messier as Ernesto
- Andrés Martínez as Gato
- Jorge López as Mauro
- Carlota Llano as Aminta
- Luz Stella Luengas as Betty
- Roberto Marín as Feliciano
- Ana Maria Jaraba as Elsa Bustos
- Juanita Arias as Mia
- Claudio Cataño as Walter
- Santiago Gómez as Jeronimo
- Katherine Miranda as Carlota
- Ramsés Ramos as Pirateque
- Javier Gardeazábal as Jairo
- Marcela Posada as Alejandra
- Isabella Pineda as Katherin
- Juan Manuel Acosta as Arturo
- Aura Helena Prada as Angela María
- Ricardo Velez as Juan
- Irene Arias as Susana
- Aco Perez as Guardia Castillo
- Fernando Lara as Investigator #1
- Fernando Arango as Investigator #2
- Lorena Mcallister as Maritza
- Catalina Acosta as Adriana
- Francisco Perez as Guardia Rodriguez
- Paola Montoya as Claudia
- Giselle Saouda as Angela
- Pedro Mogollón as the broken lawyer
- Jorge Bautista as Guardia Montoya
- Víctor Cifuentes as Zamudio
- Cesar Alvarez as Albeiro
- Fernando Villate as Maximo
- David Velez as Giovanny
- Ernesto Ballen as Prado
- Andres Martinez as Mauricio
- Martha Suarez as La Mona
- Carlos Vergara as El Zorro
- Rosalba Penagos as Carmen
- Julio Correal as Hernan
- Juan Morales as Anibal
- Juan Pablo Manzanera as Tomas
- Alex Gil as Wilmar
- Carlos Congote as Moreno
- Ilja Rosendahl as Banquero
- Silvio Plaza
- Margarita Reyes
