= The First Lady (Colombian TV series) =

Colombian telenovela

- Also known as: Deseos de mujer
- Genre: Telenovela
- Created by: Karen Rodríguez
- Story by: Sebastián Arrau
- Directed by: Andrés Marroquín; Germán Porras
- Starring: Christian Meier; Carina Cruz; Javier Jattin
- Theme music composer: Nicolás Tovar
- Opening theme: "Bella sin alma" by Nicolás Tovar
- Country of origin: Colombia
- Original language: Spanish
- No. of episodes: 156

Production
- Executive producer: Henry Toto Duquem
- Producers: Asier Aguilar; Amuchastegui
- Editor: Franko
- Camera setup: Multi-camera

Original release
- Network: Caracol Televisión
- Release: November 8, 2011 – July 6, 2012

Primera Dama (Spanish: Primera dama) or (Deseos de mujer) is a Colombian telenovela produced by Henry Toto Duquem for Caracol Televisión. It is an adaptation of the Chilean telenovela of the same name.

The series stars Christian Meier as Leonardo Santander, Carina Cruz as Paloma Zamudio and Javier Jattin as Mariano Zamora.

== Plot summary ==
Paloma is a humble young woman who has a dream that must be fulfilled no matter the consequences: becoming the First Lady of Colombia. But in order to achieve this, she must leave aside the love she feels for Mariano, win over the future president Leonardo Santander, and, most important, win the trust of his wife, who unknowingly will open the doors of her house to the woman who will end her marriage, completely destroying the life of her family and make her husband become President, so Paloma becomes the First Lady.

== Cast ==
=== Main ===
- Christian Meier as Leonardo Santander
- Carina Cruz as Paloma Zamudio de Santander
- Javier Jattin as Mariano Zamora

==== Secondary ====
- Kathy Sáenz as Ana Milena San Juan
- Paula Barreto as Luciana "Lucy" Cuadra
- Jacqueline Arenal as Estrella Soto
- María Luisa Flórez as Paula Méndez
- Juan David Agudelo as Diego Santander San Juan
- Natalia Jérez as Cristina Santander San Juan
- Caleb Casas as Aníbal Urrutia
- Greeicy Rendón as Daniela Astudillo
- Emerson Rodríguez as Amaury Bello
- Jairo Camargo as Adolfo Fernández
- Alejandra Ávila as Sandra Burr
- Mijail Mulkay as Federico "Fede" Astudillo
- José Luis García as Ángel Astudillo

== Rating ==
Season	Timeslot (ET/PT)	Episodes	First aired		Last aired	
Season	Timeslot (ET/PT)	Episodes	Date	Viewers (millions)	Date	Viewers (millions)
1	Mon–Fri 11:15pm	156	November 8, 2011	12.6	July 6, 2012	5.5
