= Angélica Blandón =

Colombian actor

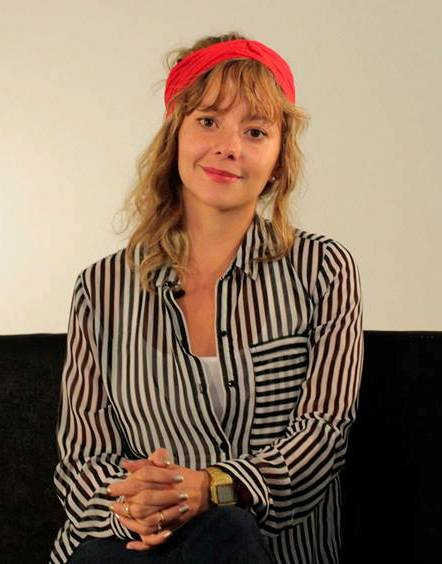
- Born: Angélica María Blandón Gallo c. 1983; Colombia
- Occupation: Actress
- Partners: Nicolás Ospina; Lukas Kristo

Angélica María Blandón Gallo (born c. 1983) is a Colombian actress. She is best known for her roles in the 2008 film Paraíso travel and telenovelas such as The Mafia Dolls and 3 milagros.

== Biography ==
Angélica Blandón was born in Colombia in the 1980s. (Note: Sources vary on her date and place of birth.) She took an interest in acting at a young age. She studied at the Efraín Arce Aragón Academy in Medellín for five years, at the Colombian Theater Corporation, and at the Superior Academy of Art in Bogotá. Later she would move with her family to New York.

Some time later she returned to Colombia and appeared in Los Monachos with María Angélica Mallarino, on the TV series Oki Doki, and the telenovela Tan cerca y tan lejos. Shortly afterward, she became part of the Rapsoda group of the Corporación Colombiana de Teatro, directed by Patricia Ariza. There she acted in the play Guadalupe años sin cuenta. She then appeared on the telenovela Vuelo 1503. In 2009, she played the protagonist Brenda on the telenovela The Mafia Dolls.

In theater, she has appeared in the plays Poses para dormir, El club del tropel, La bella durmiente, En el cielo también hay paisas, Los guardianes de la paz, Borges, and Cartera. On television she has appeared in No renuncies Salomé, Sin senos no hay paraíso, and El cartel de los sapos.

In 2007, she received the Best Actress award at the Bogotá Film Festival for the film Paraíso travel.

In 2011, she starred in 3 milagros on RCN Televisión, and 180 segundos, a film by RCN Cine.

In 2015, she played Claudia Viviana, a role inspired by Doris Adriana Niño, one of the main followers of the singer Diomedes Díaz, in the biographical telenovela Diomedes, el cacique de la junta.

== Personal life ==
Blandón married musician Nicolás Ospina, and they had a daughter together in 2007. In 2012, she began a new relationship with photographic director Lukas Kristo, and in 2020 she announced that she was pregnant with their first child.

She was the center of controversy in March 2021 when, in reaction to an incident in which a Bogotá police officer was killed, she posted to Instagram, "Well, good, it has been a long time since we received such news. A policeman, serving his uniform, usually tries to avoid arriving before the criminals have left." She later added, "My condolences to the family of this brave policeman. Bogotá, I hope that you will recover soon from this wave of insecurity that assails you in all possible ways."

== Filmography ==
=== Television ===
Year	Title	Character	Channel
1996	Oki Doki	Pato	RCN
1997-1999	Yo amo a Paquita Gallego	Fan of Alejandro Olmos	Canal A
2003-2004	No renuncies Salomé	Verónica	RCN
2005	Vuelo 1503	Claudia	Caracol Televisión
2008-2009	Sin senos no hay paraíso	Camila	Telemundo
2009-2010	The Mafia Dolls	Brenda	Caracol Televisión
2010	El cartel de los sapos 2: la guerra total	Johanna Lesmes	Caracol Televisión
2011	3 milagros	Milagros Rendón	RCN
2013	5 viudas sueltas	Luisa Bustos	Caracol Televisión
2014	El estilista	Martina Olmos	RCN
2015	Diomedes, el cacique de la junta	Claudia Viviana Mora	RCN
2017	Surviving Escobar: Alias JJ	Lorenza Penagos	Caracol Televisión
2018	Pasada de moda 2 - La edad versátil	Mariana	Caracol Play
2018	Sitiados	Corina	Fox Premium
2019	Reto 4 elementos	Herself	RCN
2020	Las ausentes	Isabel	Telecafé
2021	Interiores	Natalia	Canal Capital

=== Film ===
Year	Title	Character
2008	Paraíso travel	Reina
2009	Almas perdidas (short)	Connie
2012	180 segundos	Angie
2015	Las tetas de mi madre	Cristal
2016	Tiempo perdido	Laura
2016	Fragmentos de amor	Susana
2016	La despedida	Julia
2017	Monserrate, ¿cómo el cerro?	
