= Carina Cruz =

Colombian actress, model and designer

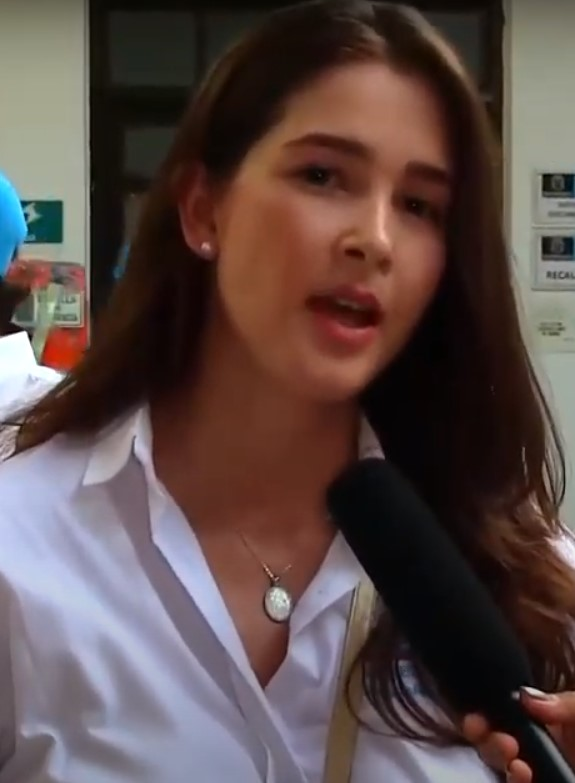
- Cruz in 2019
- Born: Carina Cruz Arenas; April 18, 1983 (age 43); Santiago de Cali, Colombia
- Occupations: Actress, model, designer

Carina Cruz Arenas (born 18 April 1983) is a Colombian actress, model and designer.

== Life and career ==
Carina Cruz was born in Cali, where she studied fashion design and started exporting casual clothing to Mexico and Ecuador.

She participated in the reality TV series Protagonistas de novela in its third season. After leaving the reality show she remained in Bogotá for three months. As she was not cast, she returned to Cali with her family.

She returned to Bogotá two years later, and was cast on Padres e Hijos then later got a role in the Por Amor.

She then traveled to Mexico and spent two years working at a modeling agency doing commercials and advertising campaigns. She auditioned for parts in telenovelas but wasn't cast.

Although still living in Mexico, she returned to Colombia to appear in Decisiones and Así es la vida. She returned to Bogotá and earned a role in El encantador by Caracol Television.

In 2009 she worked for Telemundo in Victorinos by Roberto Manrique.

In 2010 she was part of the main cast of Salvador de mujeres by Venevision International, starring Carlos Guillermo Haydon, Ruddy Rodriguez and Alejandra Sandoval. That same year she also worked in another telenovela Secretos de familia, playing the role of Catalina.

The following year (2011) she worked in Los Herederos del Monte produced by Telemundo. Later that year she was chosen to star in the Primera dama, where she shared credit with Peruvian Christian Meier and Colombian Javier Jattin.

== Filmography ==
| Year | Project | Role | Notes | Ref. |
|---|---|---|---|---|
| 2009 | Victorinos | Claudia García | TV series | |
| 2010 | El encantador | Eliana Giraldo | TV series | |
| 2010 | Salvador de mujeres | Lula Valdés | TV series | |
| 2010 | Secretos de familia | Catalina | TV series | |
| 2011 | Los herederos del Monte | Consuelo Millán | TV series | |
| 2011 | The First Lady | Paloma Zamudio | TV series | |
| 2013 | Tres Caínes | Carina | TV series | |
