= Pambelé =

Colombian biographical television series

- Genre: Biographical
- Created by: A.F. Cortés
- Based on: El oro y la oscuridad: la vida gloriosa y trágica de Kid Pambelé by Alberto Salcedo Ramos
- Written by: A.F. Cortés; Rosa Clemente; Claudia Sánchez; Jorge Ribbón; Raúl Prieto
- Directed by: Sergio Osorio; Juancho Cardona
- Starring: Jarlin Martínez; María Nela Sinisterra; Laura Vieira; Juan Alfonso Baptista; Iván López; Indhira Serrano; Pedro Palacios; Mauricio Castillo
- Music by: Osvaldo Montes
- Opening theme: "Kid Pambelé"
- Country of origin: Colombia
- Original language: Spanish
- No. of seasons: 1
- No. of episodes: 80

Production
- Executive producer: Claudia Valencia
- Producers: Neuplot; Andrés Libreros; Manolo Cardona; Juan Carlos Caicedo; Daniel Salcedo; A.F. Cortés
- Production locations: Caracas, Venezuela; Panama City
- Camera setup: Multi-camera
- Production company: 11-11 Films

Original release
- Network: RCN Televisión
- Release: July 10 - – November 3, 2017

Related
- El Comandante

Pambelé is a Colombian biographical television series created and developed by 11-11 Films, based on the book El oro y la oscuridad: la vida gloriosa y trágica de Kid Pambelé written by Alberto Salcedo Ramos. It stars Jarlin Martínez as the titular character, and it started airing on Colombian broadcast channel RCN Televisión on July 10, 2017, and concluded on November 3, 2017. The series follows the life and history of Colombian boxer Antonio Cervantes.

== Plot ==
Antonio Cervantes, better known as "The Kid Pambelé", was born on December 23, 1945, in San Basilio de Palenque, played on October 28, 1972, the world boxing title in the Welter Junior category against the champion and everyone's favorite, Alonzo Frizzo. At 27, Antonio was clear that it was his last chance to fight for a world title. Clinging to his convictions, he fought with all his might and connected an uppercut, knocking out Frizzo and giving Pambelé the title.

Antonio Cervantes, played by Jarlin Martínez is a black man, tall, thin, but with muscles marked by his constant training. As a child he had an immense burden on his shoulders and in his youth he was dazzled by his dreams of greatness. Being the eldest of his brothers, Antonio decided to take care of his family with the money that he obtained by selling cigarettes and shuffling shoes. However, at the expense of his mother's repeated scoldings, it was easier for him to get money in the street fights of the Malecón, where Clemente Roballo, the best of Colombia at the time, knows and discovers "The Kid Pambelé".

== Cast ==
- Jarlin Javier Martínez as Antonio Cervantes
- María Nela Sinisterra as Carolina Orozco Reyes
- Laura Vieira as Aurora Valencia
- Juan Alfonso Baptista as Ezequiel Mercado
- Iván López as Cristóbal Román
- Indhira Serrano as Ceferina Reyes
- Pedro Palacios as Pedro Falcon
- Vince Balanta as Chico Gonzales
- Mauricio Castillo - Milenio
- Mauricio Mejía - Cachao
- Omar Murillo - Clemente Roballo
- Juan Carlos Arango - Legata
- Jorge Monterrosa - Pete
- Karina Guerra - Noreya
- Luis Tamayo - Don Pancra
- Jaisson Jeack - Frizzo
- Iris Oyola - Yamile
- Roberto Fernandez Rizo - Diego Monagas
- Daniella Donado - Freda
- Javier De Zuani - Nicolas Roche
- Franártur Duque - Rafito Veleño
- Angely Gaviria - Julia Cervantes

== Reception ==
The series premiered as the least seen in Colombia in the evening with a total of 4.5 million viewers. The series did not manage to overcome its opponent El Chema, until it has been one the failures of RCN Televisión like the series El Comandante.
