= Diomedes, el cacique de la junta =

2015 Colombian telenovela

- Genre: Telenovela; Drama
- Written by: Fernan Rivera; Sandra Gaitan; Juan Carlos Troncoso; Pedro Hernandez
- Directed by: Herney Luna
- Starring: Orlando Liñan; Kimberly Reyes; Adriana Ricardo; Victor Hugo Trespalacios; Emilia Ceballos; Carlos Vergara; Alejandra Azcárate; Carmenza Gómez; Juan Bautista Escalona
- Opening theme: "Tu eres la reina" by Enaldo Barrera
- Country of origin: Colombia
- Original language: Spanish

Production
- Executive producer: Yalile Giordanelli
- Producer: Enrique Afanador
- Production locations: San Juan del Cesar; Bogotá; Barranquilla; Medellín; Bucaramanga; Santa Marta; Cabo de la Vela; Valledupar
- Running time: 60 minutes

Original release
- Network: RCN Televisión
- Release: 13 January – 29 October 2015

Related
- Un sueño llamado salsa; Celia

Diomedes, el cacique de la junta is a 2015 Colombian telenovela produced and broadcast by RCN Televisión. It is based on the life of Diomedes Díaz Maestre, its highest rating was 16.5 rating people and so far averaging 13.5 rating people in the 9:00PM schedule. Since its release, it becomes the country's most-watched telenovela this year.

== Cast ==
- Orlando Liñan as Diomedes Díaz Maestre (adult)
- Juan Bautista Escalona as Diomedes Díaz (child)
- Kimberly Reyes as Lucia Arjona (adult)
- Laura Rodríguez as Lucia Arjona (young)
- Adriana Ricardo as Elvira Maestre "Mama Vila"
- Carlos Vergara Montiel as Rafael María Díaz
- Emilia Ceballos as Rosa Elvira Diaz "Ocha"
- Salomé Camargo Fadul as Rosa Díaz Maestre "Ocha" (child)
- Yorneis Garcia as Rafita Diaz Maestre
- Carolina Duarte as Bertha Mejía
- Álvaro Araújo as Marcos
- Alejandra Azcárate as Yurleidiz (villain)
- Luis Carlos Fuquen as Chencho
- Victor Hugo Trespalacios as Mono Arjona (villain)
- Pillao Rodriguez as Jose Olarte
- Carmenza Gómez as Beatriz
- Emerson Rodríguez as Hernan Arjona
- Marciano Martínez as Papá Goyo Maestre
- Cristián Better as Martín Maestre
- Paula Castaño as Betsy Liliana
- Eileen Moreno as Consuelo Martínez
- Angélica Blandón as Claudia Viviana
- Priscila Mendoza as Vilma
- Enilda Rosa Vega Borja -Tita
- Margarita Reyes as Barbara (villain)
- Julio Pachón as Comandante Pinzón (villain)
- Éibar Gutiérrez as Juancho Rois
- Rafael Acosta as Joaco Guillén
- Alejandro Palacio as Don Alejo
- Mauricio Figueroa as Gabriel Muñoz
- Ramses Ramos as Mariano Saucedo
- Coco Zuleta as Emiliano Zuleta Díaz
- Juan José Granados as Nafer Durán
- Wilber Mendoza as Colacho Mendoza
- Rosendo Romero as Leandrito Sierra
- Orlando Acosta as Rafael Orozco Maestre
- Mabel Moreno as Lolo
- Aco Pérez as the white feather "el pluma blanca"
- Iroky Peréz as Jaime Peréz Porody
- Bibiana Corrales as Mariana Juliana
- Wilfrido Vargas as himself
- Jorge Barón as himself
- Juan Sebastián Calero as Gonzalo Rodríguez Gacha
- Shirley Gómez as María Paula
- Herbert King as Padre de María Paula
- Carlos Hurtado (actor) as Carlos Perdomo
- José Narváez as Sergio Molina
- Graciela Torres as "La negra candela"
- Jota Mario as himself
- Alejandra Miranda as Tía de Yurleidis
- Poncho Zuleta as himself
- Laura Osma as Mirna puente
