= 3 milagros =

Colombian telenovela

- Genre: Telenovela
- Based on: Cuando quiero llorar no lloro by Miguel Otero Silva
- Written by: Carlos Duplat; Luz Mariela Santofomio
- Directed by: Rodrigo Lalinde; Arturo Manuit; Israel Sánchez
- Creative directors: Alfonso Casilimas; Francisco Arbeláez
- Starring: Andrés Sandoval; Angélica Blandón; Johanna Bahamón; Farina Paucar Franco; Sandra Reyes; Juan Diego Sánchez; Julio Sánchez Cóccaro
- Opening theme: "Tres Milagros" by Jr. Ruiz
- Country of origin: Colombia
- Original language: Spanish
- No. of episodes: 57

Production
- Executive producer: Frank Scheuermann
- Producers: Maru Salazar; Ángela Pulido
- Editor: Elsa Vásquez
- Camera setup: Multi-camera

Original release
- Network: RCN Televisión
- Release: September 20, 2011 – January 19, 2012

Related
- Tres Milagros (Mexican TV series)

3 milagros is a Colombian drama telenovela premiered on Colombian broadcast channel RCN Televisión on September 20, 2011, and concluded on January 19, 2012, based on the book written by the Venezuelan author Miguel Otero Silva, entitled Cuando quiero llorar no lloro. The show is produced by Teleset and RCN Televisión and it stars Angélica Blandón, Johanna Bahamón, Farina Paucar Franco as the Milagro's sisters, along with Andrés Sandoval, Sandra Reyes, Juan Diego Sánchez, and Julio Sánchez Cóccaro.

== Cast ==
- Angélica Blandón as Milagros "Milala" Rendón
  - María José Vargas Agudelo as "Milala" Rendón (child)
- Johanna Bahamón as Milagros "Milu" Fontanarrosa
  - Ilenia Antonini as "Milú" Fontanarrosa (child)
- Farina Paucar Franco as Milagros "Nikita" Cruz
  - María José Rangel as "Nikita" Cruz (child)
- Andrés Sandoval as Fernando "Nando" Rendón
  - Juan Quintero as "Nando" Rendón (young)
  - Carlos Ochoa as "Nando" Rendón (child)
- Juan Diego Sánchez as Marcelo Botero
  - Jaime Andrés Pérez Osorio as Marcelo Botero (child)
- Julio Sánchez Cóccaro as Tomas Rendón
- Sandra Reyes as Aleyda de Rendón
- Luz Stella Luengas as Dioselina de Rendón
- Xiomara Xibillé as María Patricia Botero de Fontanarrosa
- Juan Carlos Messier as Ricardo Fontanarrosa
- Bianca Arango as Ivonne Botero
- María Angélica Mallarino as Inés de Botero
- Carlos Duplat as Álvaro Botero
- Indhira Serrano as Visitación "Madonna" de Cruz
- Alberto Cardeño as Guadalupe Cruz
- Margoth Velásquez as Mama Sunta
- Mauricio Bastidas as Pedro Venildo Cáceres "PVC"
  - Juan Manuel Julio as "PVC" (child)
- Ana Bolena Meza as Reina Cecilia Delgadillo
- Cristian Gómez as Charly
- José Manuel Henao as John Fredy Riasco, Alias "El Astro"
- Mari Pili Barreda as Melisa
- Juliana Betancourth as Leidy
- Luis Eduardo Motoa as Rafael Peláez
- Alejandro Gutiérrez as Juez Urrea
- Vida Torres as Cinthya
- Carlos Arbeláez as Guillermo
- Carolina Ramírez as Tatiana Cifuentes
- Julio César Meza as Maicol
- Cristian Mosquera as Maicol Jr
- Biassini Segura as Salvador Rendón
  - Luis Giraldo as Salvador Rendón (child)
- Carlos Fernándes as Teniente Aquiles Suárez
- Andres Felipe Torres as Byron
- Isa Mosquera as "La Negra"
- Diego Ramos as Valentino
- Jefferson Medina as "Rasquiña"
- Patricia Castañeda as Celina
- Miguel Ramos as Pancho Villa
- Javier Sáenz as Américo
- Ilja Rosendahl as Marco Bellini
- Antún Castro as "el Iluminado"
- Walter Díaz as Augusto Landazo
- Carolina Sepúlveda as Teniente Sachica
- Milena Granados as Jaqueline
- Fernando Arango as "el Cordobés"
- Brian Moreno as Elkin
- Daniel Serna as Sibachoque
- Liliana Vanegas as Cadete Alférez
- John Alex Castillo as Ramiro
- Carlos Serrato as Teniente Rojas
- Emilia Ceballos as Laura Sáenz
- Andrés Parra as Roberto Alias "el Socio"
- Ítalo Londero as Samy Cohen
- Christian de Dios as Tsunami
- Jennifer Arenas as Cadete Patricia
