= 2091 (TV series) =

Colombian science fiction series

- Genre: Science Fiction
- Created by: Andrés Gelós
- Directed by: Carolina Jiménez
- Starring: Angely Gaviria
- Country of origin: Colombia
- Original language: Spanish
- No. of seasons: 1
- No. of episodes: 12

Production
- Production locations: Bogotá, Neiva, Huila and Tatacoa Desert
- Editor: Jose Ezpinosa
- Production company: Fox Telecolombia

Original release
- Network: Fox Channel (Latin America)
- Release: October 18, 2016 – June 7, 2017

2091 is a Colombian television science fiction action series created by Andrés Gelós for Fox Latin America. The series premiered on October 18, 2016 and consists of 12 episodes. The series was recorded entirely in Colombia, in locations including the capital city Bogotá and the city of Neiva and the Tatacoa Desert in Huila Department.

The series was produced by Fox Telecolombia and was directed by Felipe Martínez Amador and Álvaro Curiel. Full 3D CGI animation was used to create special effects for the futuristic cities, spaceships and planets.

The plot takes place 75 years in the future, where humanity's behavior has exhausted the planet's resources, forcing its inhabitants to look for alternatives to ensure their survival.

== Synopsis ==
Seven New Manaus gamers are recruited by the Neodymium Corporation to carry out an extreme game on the terraformed moon of Callisto. On board the Colonus, which is a spaceship, a game console, mother and father at the same time, they compete with each other for glory and privilege in Destiny City. However, everything changes when Ferrán (Manolo Cardona), the oldest player, discovers the sinister truth hidden in the game.

== Cast ==
- Manolo Cardona as Ferrán
- Benjamín Vicuña as Lodi
- Angie Cepeda as Lila
- Ludovico Di Santo as Mefisto
- Luz Cipriota as Altea
- José Restrepo as Kim/Gaspar
- Jean Paul Leroux as Reznik
- Damián Alcázar as el Sr. Patrick Hull
- Christopher Von Uckermann as Inpar/Derik Hull
- Isabella García (actress) as Vera
- Cristina Rodlo as Enira/Lua
- Salvador del Solar as Gorlero
- Roberto San Martín as Kore
- Gonzalo Vivanco as Mr. Park
- Geraldine Zivic as la Doctora Yun
- Julio Bracho as Almorás / Dr. Astor Sharma
- Claudio Cataño as Lorent
- Jason Day as Lutar
- Tim Janssen as Pok
- Natalia Reyes as Roda
- Flora Martínez as Sonia (wife of Enrique Bogarin) / S.O.N.I.A (artificial intelligence)
- Angely Gaviria as Ina

== Episodes ==
No.	Title	Directed by	Written by	Original release date	Viewers (millions)
1	"The Real"	Felipe Martínez Amador	Andrés Gelós, Natacha Caravia, Martín Preusche, Luis E. Langlemey	October 18, 2016	—
In the city of New Manaus, seven gamers (Ferrán, Lila, Mefisto, Resnik, Altea, Kim and Lodi) are recruited by the Neodymium Corporation to play an extreme game on the terraformed moon of Callisto, in exchange for earning a privileged place in Destination City. But everything changes when Ferrán discovers that the game is a montage to force them to control and kill real people. Therefore, Colonus leaves the ship to try to save people who are still alive.
2	"Pawn to Queen"	Felipe Martínez Amador	Natacha Caravia, Martín Preusche, Luis E. Langlemey	October 25, 2016	—
While Ferrán disappears in Calisto, Lila insists on continuing to play and seals a strategic alliance with an unexpected rival. In the subsoil of the arena, a mystery is about to come to light to challenge the continuity of the game.
3	"Dejá Vu"	Felipe Martínez Amador	Andrés Gelós, Natacha Caravia, Martín Preusche, Luis E. Langlemey	November 1, 2016	—
Lila risks her army, willing to do anything, to find Ferran's whereabouts and receives unexpected help. Inpar continues to watch over the survivors of the arena and goes to the aid of a new warrior. Almorás achieves his first victory and is determined to challenge his god.
4	"Caballo de Troya"	Felipe Martínez Amador	Natacha Caravia, Martín Preusche, Luis E. Langlemey	November 8, 2016	—
Mephisto puts a new strategy into practice to win the game while Lila discovers the best kept secret of the Colonus ship. Inpar decides to make himself known to protect Enira's life and, unintentionally, ends up putting the safety of his people at risk. A new player is eliminated and checks the final destination of all game participants.
5	"Lose to Win"	-	-	November 15, 2016	—
Lila tries to discover who Inpar is but a surprise confrontation delays her plans. Mephisto gets new information to dominate the game as a new threat endangers the ship. On Earth, the Neodymium Corporation encounters the only truth capable of changing all its plans in Callisto.
6	"Time Out"	-	-	November 22, 2016	—
Lila allies with the least-respected player, but the past of the arena warriors puts her strategy at risk. Mephisto attacks Altea, challenging the limits of the game. The Neodymium Corporation is forced to take drastic measures to restore order in Callisto.
7	"The Bettor"	-	-	May 3, 2017	—
Enira manages to capture her enemy and prepares to fulfill the mission entrusted to her by her goddess. Lila anxiously awaits the restart of the game never imagining that she is about to lose the only thing that really matters to her. Mephisto challenges the Neodymium Corporation, regardless of the consequences.
8	"Welcome Home"	-	-	May 10, 2017	—
Mephisto turns to Lila to continue the game and will soon learn how far a mother's despair can go. Inpar, along with Enira, believes he is approaching the end of his adventure in Callisto. An old acquaintance from Sonia arrives at the Colonus ship.
9	"Damage Control"	-	-	May 17, 2017	—
On board the unknown ship, Inpar and Enira discover that a new threat looms over them. Lila is punished for breaking the rules of the game, while Altea learns that Mephisto remains a dangerous player. Meanwhile, Almorás, confused by his memories, wants to meet SONIA.
10	"Reset"	-	-	May 24, 2017	—
The game starts again inside the Colonus ship. Some unexpected help comes to the scavengers. In the ship, Moros Gorlero meets Inpar and Enira and takes them hostage. Ferrán is forced to play to save the Lila's players, who were being slaughtered by Altea's team. Almorás remembers that, in the past, it was Dr. Sharma who recognized SONIA and assigned Ferrán to save her.
11	"The Missing Piece"	-	-	May 31, 2017	—
12	"Anomaly"	-	-	June 7, 2017	—

== Production ==
=== Development ===
The series was created by Andrés Gelós, who also created Kdabra and Cumbia Ninja. Edgar Spielmann, COO of FOX Networks Group Latin America, stated that "The completion of Cumbia Ninja last year provided us with the experience and direction necessary to develop a project of this magnitude. 2091 is definitely our most ambitious production in terms of post production, where between 70% and 80% of each episode is mixed with visual effects and the total post-production process of the series extends up to a year."

=== Filming ===
The series began filming in April 2016 in Colombia, specifically in the cities of Bogota, the desert of Tatacoa and Neiva. The first season ended in July 2016.

== Marketing ==
On July 1, 2016, the Fox Latin America channel launched the first teaser of the series, which shows different newspaper headlines with dates between 2016 and 2091. Most of the headlines talk about the power that video games have taken with the passing of years.

The second teaser was released on August 13, 2016, showing the series logo alongside fragments of dystopian images and police. Ten days later the first promotional advance of the series was launched, in which the protagonists describe 2091 with different synonyms and made a countdown until the premiere.
