= Angely Gaviria =

Colombian actress

- Born: Angely Gaviria Zurita; August 9, 1996 (age 29); Cartagena, Colombia
- Occupation: Actress
- Years active: 2012–present
- Website: angelygaviria.com

Angely Gaviria is a Colombian actress who is currently starring in the Netflix series Always a Witch as Carmen Eguiluz. Her previous works include the series 2091 and Pambelé (about boxer Antonio Cervantes).

== Background ==
Gaviria grew up in La María neighborhood of Cartagena, Colombia with her parents and two younger brothers. She became interested in modeling at age 14 and won second place in the 'Miss Afro-Descendant' contest. At age 16 she won the "Señorita Afrodescendiente" contest.

She won a scholarship to study engineering at the University of Bogotá and moved there with her family.

Her acting career started with roles as an extra in La Selección and Niche for the Caracol Television Network. Her first acting role was as Ina in Fox's sci-fi series 2091. Her next role was as Julia Cervantes in Pambelé, a biopic about boxer Antonio Cervantes. She was in the second semester of engineering when 'Pambelé' completed. She switched to studying acting and ballet. In 2019 she landed the lead role of Carmen in the Netflix/Caracol series Always a Witch (a.k.a. 'Siempre Bruja').

== Reception ==
Reviewing her performance in Always a Witch, Vox wrote "Angely Gaviria is, by far, the main reason to watch Siempre Bruja. ... Her Carmen is vulnerable, optimistic, headstrong, and flawed." Writing about the show for Remezcla, Kristen Lopez said that Gaviria was "probably the one thing that keeps 'Siempre Bruja' afloat", Manuel Betancourt described her as "wonderful and expressive" and Kathia Woods said "One of the reasons we are rooting for Carmen is because of Angely’s performance".Danielli Marzouca wrote "The best part of the whole show is Angely Gaviria performance of Carmen."

== Filmography ==
| Year | Title | Role | Notes |
|---|---|---|---|
| 2016–2017 | 2091 | Ina | 8 episodes |
| 2017 | Pambelé | Julia | |
| 2019–2020 | Always a Witch | Carmen Eguiluz | Main role |
