= Los protegidos (Colombian TV series) =

- Created by: Juana Uribe
- Developed by: RCN Televisión
- Starring: Mark Tacher & Veronica Orozco
- Country of origin: Colombia
- Original language: Spanish
- No. of episodes: 110

Production
- Executive producer: Leonardo Baron
- Producer: Juan Pablo Posada
- Production locations: Bogotá, Colombia; Santa Marta, Colombia; Barranquilla, Colombia; Italy
- Camera setup: Multi-camera
- Running time: 45 minutes
- Production company: RCN Televisión

Original release
- Network: RCN
- Release: May 6, 2008 – January 29, 2009

Los Protegidos, The Protected or The Sheltered, is a Colombian telenovela aired from May 6, 2008, to January 29, 2009, on Colombian TV network RCN. This telenovela is produced by Teleset and it was created as a counterweight for Caracol Televisión's new production El cartel, but it was premiered before this last one in order to get a higher impact in the viewers.

== Story ==
The day that Santiago Puerta comes back from Italy, after getting a graduate degree in crime investigation, he is sure his future is brilliant, after getting his dream job in La Fiscalia, Investigation Bureau in Colombia. Finally he will be able to compensate his father, Bernardo Puerta (Carlos Barbosa), the huge effort he had put into funding his son's career as a lawyer and then as an expert in crime investigation.

In Italy, Santiago meets his better half, classmate and then his fiancée, Lina Santana, but when he comes back to Colombia he realizes that everything is not going to be as easy as he thought.

Santiago has to face Lina's father, Rogelio Santana, who is completely against the idea of his wedding with Lina. On the other hand, Santiago finds out that his father is not the same accountant, but the assistant of a dangerous man, nicknamed "El Kes", Luis Fernando Arango, who is the key man in a huge crime organization on the Colombian Caribbean.

Santiago convinces his father to betray "El Kes" so he can be back to legality, but things get complicated when Santiago's father begins a relationship with El Kes' all life lover "La Bandi" (Ana Bolena Meza), after she was badly injured by El Kes.

Now, Santiago's family with La Bandi's family has to disappear and become one family with another life completely different, to join a Witnesses Protection Program. But their hugest fear became true when El Kes escape and now he is looking for them to make them pay for betraying him.

Well Lina, who has a gift, being able to know things that are going to happen in the future, is sure she will find Santiago in Bogotá, so she moves there, but what she does not know is that El Kes is in Bogota, too, and he is sure that she is the ticket to find Santiago, and so Bernardo and La Bandi
