= Cuando quiero llorar no lloro =

1970 novel by Miguel Otero Silva

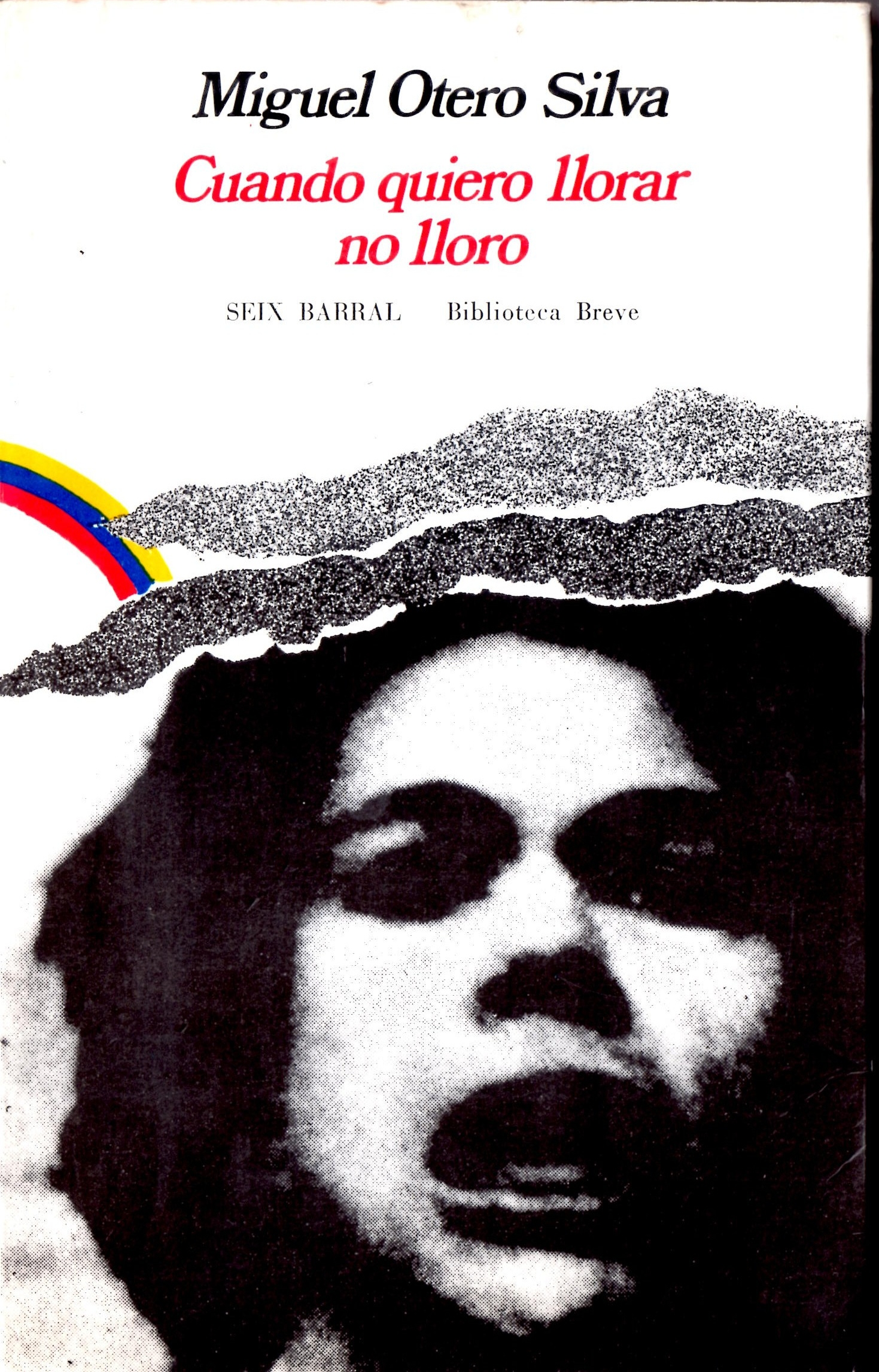
- Author: Miguel Otero Silva
- Language: Spanish
- Genre: Fiction
- Published: 1970 New Time
- Pages: 195
- ISBN: 980-388-000-4
- OCLC: 10056520
- Preceded by: The death of Honorius (1963)
- Followed by: Lope de Aguirre, prince of freedom | Lope de Aguirre ... (1979)

Cuando quiero llorar no lloro (Spanish: "When I want to cry, I don't") is the fifth novel by Venezuelan writer Miguel Otero Silva published on June 25, 1970. It is considered one of the most important pieces of Silva's works and of Venezuelan literature in general. The book is set in the historical events of Venezuela during the 1950s and 1960s, and exposes the socio-political conditions of the country during that time period. According to Silva's wife, the novel was written during a four-month-long retreat at the Villa Guillichini, a medieval castle the writer owned in Arezzo, Italy.

The novel was made into a film by Maurice Wallerstein in 1973, and produced as a miniseries in Colombia in 1991 under the name Cuando quiero llorar no lloro or Los Victorinos. In 2009 the miniseries was adapted to telenovela format under the title The Victorinos by the American channel Telemundo. At the time of its release on June 23, the telenovela captured the largest audience in the history of that channel. In 2011, the series was made into a telenovela again, but this time with three women, under the title 3 Milagros by the Colombian channel RCN.

== Title ==
The title is a reference to the poem Cancion de Otoño en Primavera (Song of Autumn in the Springtime) by the Nicaraguan poet Rubén Darío.

Youth, divine treasure,
Gone, never to come back!
When I want to cry, I don't ...
and sometimes I cry without a want ...

Another translation:

Youth, treasure only gods may keep,
Fleeting from me forever now!
I cannot, when I wish to, weep,
And sometimes I cry, I know not how…
