= Always a Witch =

Colombian drama-fantasy series

- Spanish: Siempre Bruja
- Genre: Fantasy; Romantic comedy
- Created by: Ana María Parra
- Based on: Yo, bruja by Isidora Chacón
- Written by: Ana María Parra; Jason Ning; Jenn Kao; Ildy Modrovich; Sheri Elwood; Alex Katsnelson; Chris Rafferty; Mike Costa
- Directed by: Liliana Bocanegra; Louis Milito; Matt Earl Beesley; Tim Matheson; Mateo Stivelberg
- Starring: Angely Gaviria; Lenard Vanderaa; Carlos Quintero; Sebastián Eslava; Cristina Warner; Sofía Araújo; Valeria Henríquez; Dylan Fuentes; Verónica Orozco; Luis Fernando Hoyos; Óscar Casas
- Country of origin: Colombia
- Original language: Spanish
- No. of seasons: 2
- No. of episodes: 18

Production
- Executive producers: Mateo Stivelberg; Liliana Bocanegra
- Producers: Dago García; Juliana Barrera
- Production locations: Bogotá; Cartagena, Colombia; Honda, Tolima
- Camera setup: Multiple-camera setup
- Running time: 32–43 minutes
- Production company: Caracol Televisión

Original release
- Network: Netflix
- Release: February 19, 2019 – February 28, 2020

Always a Witch (Spanish: Siempre Bruja) is a Colombian television series starring Angely Gaviria, Sofia Bernal Araujo, Dylan Fuentes, Valeria Henríquez, Carlos Quintero with Lenard Vanderaa. The plot revolves around Carmen Eguiluz (Angely Gaviria), a witch and slave from 1646, and is set both in the 17th-century and present-day Cartagena, Colombia. It was ordered direct-to-series, and the first full season premiered on Netflix streaming on February 19, 2019. It was renewed by Netflix for a second season, which aired worldwide on February 28, 2020. The show is dubbed in English for English speakers.

== Premise ==
In Always a Witch, Carmen Eguiluz (Angely Gaviria) is accused of witchcraft and is set to burn at the stake, according to the way of the Inquisition in 1646 colonial Colombia. While imprisoned and waiting for her execution, Carmen makes a deal with the wizard Aldemar, which makes her able to time-travel to 2019 in exchange for a favor. She won't be able to use magic there though, since it would make Lucien, a powerful but evil wizard, aware of her presence.

== Reception ==
The series has received mixed reviews from critics. While some praised the show for having a strong black female lead character, others have criticized the enslaved/enslaver romance, and the lead character's willingness to return to the 1600s, thus returning to being a slave, just to be with her enslaver's son.

== Cast ==
=== Main ===
- Angely Gaviria as Carmen Eguiluz, a powerful witch from the 1640s who is propelled forward in time to 2019.
- Dylan Fuentes as Johnny Ki, Carmen's best friend and confidante in 2019.
- Sofia Bernal Araujo as Alicia, Carmen's friend in 2019. In 2020, she begins delving into witchcraft herself.
- Valeria Henríquez as Mayte, León's girlfriend and one of Carmen's friends in 2019.
- Carlos Quintero as León, Mayte's boyfriend and one of Carmen's friends in 2019.
- Sebastián Eslava as Esteban, Carmen's, León's, Alicia's, Mayte's and Daniel's professor in 2019.
- Lenard Vanderaa as Cristobal De Aranoa, Carmen's lover in 1646.
- Luis Fernando Hoyos as Aldemar the Immortal, a powerful wizard held captive in 1646. (Season 1)
- Oscar Casas as Kobo, a pirate from the late 17th century who finds himself in 2020, and who has a mysterious connection to Alicia. (Season 2)

=== Recurring ===
- Cristina Warner as Isabel de Aranoa, Cristobal's mother in 1646.
- Edu Martín as Fernando De Aranoa, Cristobal's father in 1646. (Season 1)
- Juan Manuel Mendoza as Detective Pablo Corcel
- Verónica Orozco as Ninibé
- John Alex Castillo as Braulio
- Constanza Duque as Adelaida
- Mayra Luna as Hilda
- Norma Nivia as Ximena Gamez
- Dubán Andrés Prado as Daniel
- Matthew Moreno as Oscar
- Felix Mercado as Rogelio
- Indhira Serrano as Dr. Luisa

== Episodes ==
Series	Episodes	Originally released
1	10	19 February 2019
2	8	28 February 2020

=== Season 1 (2019) ===
No. overall	No. in season	Title	Directed by	Written by	Original release date
1	1	"A Leap in Time"	Liliana Bocanegra	Ana Maria Parra	February 19, 2019
In Cartagena, 1646, Carmen Eguiluz is accused of witchcraft during the Spanish Inquisition and sentenced to burn at the stake. However, prior to burning, she travels through time to the year 2019 where she is taken to a hospital. The hospital staff are concerned by the burns on her feet and contact the police. Detective Corcel arrives believing Carmen may be a victim of the Fire Killer, who has murdered several young women in Cartagena. She escapes before being questioned, and begins searching for someone named Ninibe. She evades the police by hiding in the former De Aranoa home, now a hostel, and meets Johnny Ki, the owner's grandson. She then goes to the University and finds Ninibe, a biology professor, and gives her a green stone. Ninibe promises to return Carmen to the past, but before she can, she is attacked by a shadowy being and vanishes. Carmen is captured by the police. In a flashback to 1646, Carmen is sold on the slave market. She is purchased by the family of Cristobal De Aranoa and the two fall in love. However, they are caught by Cristobal's mother, Isabel, who accuses Carmen of bewitching her son. Cristobal tries to defend her from the mob and is shot by his father. Carmen is thrown in prison where she meets a wizard, Aldemar the Immortal. He offers her a deal, he will save Cristobal if Carmen travels to the future to find a woman named Ninibe and break Aldemar's curse. He warns her that if she uses magic, she will summon the evil wizard Lucien.
2	2	"A University Witch"	Liliana Bocanegra	Ana Maria Parra	February 19, 2019
Carmen is interrogated by Corcel, and is eventually released. A university student, Alicia, is also questioned as she was seen arguing with Ninibe shortly before the latter's disappearance. At the hostel, Johnny Ki sees Carmen levitating in her sleep and takes a video. Carmen follows Alicia to the University, believing her to be the disciple mentioned by Ninibe. She joins the class, now taught by Esteban. She joins Alicia and Daniel at a welcome party for the biology students and discovers she can see memories by touching people's skin. She follows Alicia to Ninibe's home where Alicia is trying to download files from Ninibe's computer. However, they are interrupted by another woman and Carmen helps Alicia escape. Alicia reveals that she is being blackmailed by her ex-boyfriend, Angel, with an incriminating video and that she had gone to Ninibe for help. Carmen gives Alicia a potion to make her ex-boyfriend forget their relationship. However, the potion fails and Angel sends the video to Alicia's close friends. Carmen meanwhile has a vision of Ninibe in a forest, and discovers a burned skeleton. She writes a letter to Cristobal and tucks it in the gap above the window where they used to leave each other messages. Johnny Ki confronts Carmen about being a witch and says he needs her help.
3	3	"Ouija"	Louis Milito	Jason Ning & Jenn Kao	February 19, 2019
4	4	"Stolen Shadow, Witch Forgotten"	Matt Earl Beesley	Ildy Modrovich	February 19, 2019
5	5	"The Festival of Candela"	Tim Matheson	Sheri Elwood	February 19, 2019
6	6	"The Ritual of Forgetting"	Mateo Stivelberg	Jason Ning	February 19, 2019
7	7	"Lucien"	Mateo Stivelberg	Alex Katsnelson	February 19, 2019
8	8	"1646"	Mateo Stivelberg	Jenn Kao	February 19, 2019
9	9	"The Time Portal"	Mateo Stivelberg	Chris Rafferty	February 19, 2019
10	10	"The Final Trip"	Mateo Stivelberg	Alex Katsnelson & Mike Costa	February 19, 2019
Carmen and her friends decide they must stop Aldemar. Meanwhile, Aldemar returns to the Time Portal with Ninibe so he might travel and find other great witches and wizards and learn their secrets, however the green stone is gone and Ninibe begins to suspect she is being used. Aldemar attacks and bewitches Daniel who tells Carmen that Esteban escaped and she will never see him again. Mayte and Alicia infiltrate Ninibe's Women's Circle in hopes of finding clues to Aldemar's or Esteban's whereabouts. There, Alicia witnesses Ninibe threaten Sandra into returning the Book of Shadows. Ninibe then bewitches Mayte and Alicia. Carmen uses the Ouija board to contact Esteban but finds Aldemar instead. Aldemar claims that he will set Esteban free if Carmen delivers the green stone. Carmen concocts a plan to capture Aldemar unaware that several of her friends are now his unwilling agents. Aldemar confronts Sandra about the Book of Shadows, but when asked for more time he turns her to ash to Ninibe's horror. Meanwhile, Leon reveals the truth of Carmen's origins and Aldemar to Detective Corcel, and Aldemar meets with Carmen to retrieve the stone. There, Aldemar reveals that Esteban escaped by joining him and attacks Carmen when she refuses to do the same. However, when Aldemar attempts to burn her alive, Esteban turns against him and receives a mortal wound. Johnny Ki steals Aldemar's shadow, freeing Daniel, Alicia and Mayte from his spell, and he dissolves into ash. Carmen, whose powers have returned, heals Esteban, and Corcel, who witnessed the entire showdown, leaves to take Ninibe into custody. Ninibe, however, proves she is not the Fire Killer with a video of Aldemar killing Sandra and Corcel is forced to let her go. Carmen uses her powers to allow Johnny Ki to say goodbye to his parents, gently rebuffs Esteban, and prepares to return to the past. Before she can, Cristobal arrives through the Portal and Carmen realizes that Johnny Ki has gone back in time to try and save his parents, mistakenly going to the 17th century. It is revealed that Johnny Ki has been captured by pirates, who take him aboard a ship to an unknown location.

=== Season 2 (2020) ===
No. overall	No. in season	Title	Directed by	Written by	Original release date
11	1	"Someone Like Me"	Unknown	Unknown	February 28, 2020
Carmen and Alicia find Johnny Ki in the 17th century, cavorting in a band of pirates, but he begs them for more time in the past. Carmen gives him two days, and returns to the present. The group celebrates his impending return at their favorite bar, where Carmen's palm reading skills attract the attention of another group of students: Amanda, Miguel, and Tomas. Esteban warns Carmen to be careful about advertising her skills, but she admits that she wants to find another lineage witch to open a secret chapter of the Book of Shadows. When Leon complains of being overworked, Carmen makes him a potion to help, but Daniel steals it and starts distributing it. Johnny Ki returns to the present-- with Kobo, the leader of the pirate band, and does not tell Carmen.
12	2	"Leeches"	Unknown	Unknown	February 28, 2020
13	3	"Antares"	Unknown	Unknown	February 28, 2020
14	4	"Mr. Hyde"	Unknown	Unknown	February 28, 2020
15	5	"A Crack in Time"	Unknown	Unknown	February 28, 2020
16	6	"From Student to Master"	Unknown	Unknown	February 28, 2020
17	7	"One Last Wish"	Unknown	Unknown	February 28, 2020
18	8	"Impossible"	Unknown	Unknown	February 28, 2020

== Release ==
The first full season consisting of 10 episodes premiered on Netflix streaming on February 19, 2019. It was renewed by Netflix for a second season, which started airing worldwide on February 28, 2020.
