= Victorinos =

American telenovela

- Created by: Gustavo Bolívar
- Based on: Cuando quiero llorar no lloro by Miguel Otero Silva
- Directed by: Ramiro Meneses; Mario Mitriotti
- Creative director: Gabriel Monroy
- Starring: Mauricio Ochmann; Arap Bethke; Roberto Manrique; Silvia de Dios; Juan Carlos Salazar; Noelle Schönwald; Gustavo Angarita Jr.; Liliana González; Lucho Velazco; Norma Nivia; María Margarita Giraldo; Gary Forero; Juanita Humar; Isabel Cristina Estrada; Francisco Bolívar; César Mora; Estefanía Gómez
- Music by: Miguel de Narváez
- Country of origin: United States
- Original language: Spanish
- No. of seasons: 1
- No. of episodes: 153

Production
- Executive producer: Hugo León Ferrer
- Editor: Alba Merchan Hamann
- Camera setup: Multi-camera

Original release
- Network: Telemundo
- Release: 23 June 2009 – 5 February 2010

Related
- Sin senos no hay paraíso; ¿Dónde está Elisa?

Victorinos is a Spanish-language telenovela produced by the United States–based television network Telemundo. It debuted on June 23, 2009, replacing Sin Senos no hay Paraíso and concluded February 5, 2010.

The telenovela is a remake of the 1991 RTI Colombia weekly series Cuando Quiero Llorar No Lloro (best known in Colombia as Los Victorinos), which in turn is based loosely in the homonymous 1970 novel by Venezuelan writer Miguel Otero Silva. Ramiro Meneses, who is currently directing the Telemundo telenovela, starred as one of the Victorinos in the 1991 RTI series.

The serial ran from Monday to Friday to run for over 26 weeks. As with most of its other soap operas, the network broadcasts English subtitles as closed captions on CC3. This show was replaced by the original serial of the show, it had replaced. (Victorinos replaced Sin Senos no hay Paraíso and Victorinos was replaced by Sin Tetas No Hay Paraíso, which was the original version of 'Sin Senos" on Telemundo). Telemundo is currently re-airing the series at 12:30/11:30 PM slot

== Plot ==
The story begins with four men, all born the same day, each named Victorino. The first one (Victorino Mora), poor and less fortunate, was born into a loving family composed by his mother and stepfather and later on, 2 younger siblings. Not much longer however, his biological father killed the man he knew as his dad and doomed him to a life of crime filled with hate and vengeance.

The second one is born into a family of upper class (Victorino Gallardo). His father was a criminal and when he turned old enough, he followed into his father's steps.

The third one was born in a middle-class family and appreciated all the good things he had in his life (Victorino Manjarres). Since birth his father pushed him to be a general in the army, but could not and ended serving in the police department.

And, the fourth one (Victorino Perez), was born to a schemer (get rich fast, very rich, though as a result of undermining people) and his much younger buxom wife, he dies of a heart attack and she dies soon after giving birth to Victorino. The baby was later adopted into a middle-class family. His adoptive mother (Gloria) was a tool for a gay couple ( Franchesca and Julian Perez) who wanted to adopt him, but later on stayed and became part of the family.

The day of their birth, a prominent fortune-teller, (Norman Ragner), predicted their fate: The day when the three Victorino's meet, one of them will die. After revealing this prophecy Ragner suddenly dies of an apparent heart attack. The prophecy is not taken seriously at first until Victorino Gallardo's mother, discovers that there are two, and then later three Victorinos, causing her to find out everything about the prophecy. It's soon discovered that there's not THREE but FOUR Victorinos, as a result Mrs. Gallardo pushes the issue further and discovers that Ragner had an assistant (Phillip duMonde), who we find out later in the novela that his interest in the matter sparks from the death of his son, who was a victim of a prior prophecy, he remembers the Ragner saying that if four people of the same name have the same birth date meet, TWO of them will die.

A turning point in the story occurs when Mora is hired to work for Gallardo, his first job with the "Clan Gallardo" is to kill a famous political figure who is riding in Julian's (Victorino Perez's adoptive father) taxi, Mora succeeds in killing the politician, but was forced to have to kill Julian, so that there's no eyewitness. (Julian though seriously wounded, eventually fully recovers and recognized Mora as the killer, being that he knew Mora from when he was a schoolmate of Victorino Perez) at the same time Manjarres gets admitted to the police academy, with his first order of action to do away with the "Clan Gallardo".

As time progresses, many truths get realized by each other, (most notably, that Mora's first theft involved robbing Gallardo's house and falling in love Gallardo's sister Diana) alas causing rifts but some alliances toward each other (A notable example is when Manjarres and his fiancé/fellow cop Claudia are chasing Mora, who they by then know he attempted to kill Julian, and was at least an accomplice to the death of the politician) and Claudia gets stuck on some railroad tracks with an oncoming train, Mora stops his pursuit and decides to help save Claudia. Along the way all 4 Victorinos get to know at least 2 of the other Victorinos, whether as schoolmates (in the case of Mora and Perez), cop and inmate (in the case of Manjarres and Mora) as boss and henchman (in the case of Gallardo and Mora) and fugitive and cop (in the case of Gallardo and Manjarres).

Manjarres is ready to marry Claudia, but Gallardo angered by Manjarres' pursuit decides to kill him, instead killing Claudia and paralyzing Efrain (Manjarres' father), as a result Manjarres quits the police force and becomes a vigilante with a sole purpose to kill Gallardo to avenge the death of his future wife. Meanwhile, in addition to the charges Mora is charged with, he's charged with kidnapping Diana (the reality being Diana left on her own free will to be with Mora), only igniting Gallardo's anger toward Mora, who ever approved of his love to his sister. And, Perez knowing it was Mora who attempted to kill his father, also has a grudge on his former friend.

It is noted to say, that all through the show, there's been occasions where three Victorinos were at the same place, at the same time, and when this would happen, a sudden thunderstorm, with a gust of wind would occur.

Then, comes a day where by fate all four Victorinos are at the same place, when Mora and Gallardo are in jail, Manjarres being at the jail knowing Gallardo is now there and Perez, who was driving a woman to the jail (later revealed as a mother of an inmate who helps smuggle a bomb into a jail) at the same time, the bomb explodes causing a hole in the jail wall allowing the prisoners to escape. Gallardo escapes being chased by Mora, with Manjarres not far behind, Diana who was waiting outside the jail to visit Mora and to tell her brother he loved Mora sees this and calls for Mora, he turns around to see her and is shot in the back four times and is killed by Victorino Gallardo, and the second of the four Victorino's dies (Victorino Perez) as a result of just being down the street of the jail, having stayed around to see the commotion and is shot by one of Victorino Gallardo's main henchmen "El Carnicero" and later died in the hospital. It's here where it's discovered that "the 4th Victorino" (Victorino Perez) isn't named "Victorino" after all, as he was adopted and the adoption agency, misinterpreted his name as being "Victorino" when it was "Victor", (so in theory him being killed did not fulfill the prophecy of two Victorinos being killed). However, the viewer learns that another Victorino, one not seen or known about on the program died the same day as Victorino Mora named "Victorino Jimenez", as a result the prophecy was fulfilled and was not averted, as a result a new prophecy would begin. duMonde knowing that the attempt to avert the prophecy failed, begins to investigate clues on what the new prophecy could be, and discovers in Ragner's old papers, that after a prophecy involving four people is fulfilled, the new prophecy involves three people of the opposite sex (in this case women) falling in love with the two survivors of the last prophecy. duMonde realizes this and tries to avert this, but just three months after the deaths of the Victorinos the new prophecy begins when we become introduced to the Victorinas.

the first Victorina, (Victorina Salinas) is a psychologist and clairvoyant, who though is engaged to a pilot named Marcos, falls in love with Victorino Manjarres.

The second Victorina, (Victorina Fernandez) is a lifeguard at a five-star resort owned by a multi-millionaire (Mr. Crosweit), he would later fall in love with her, and have aspirations of promoting her to the position as the head supervisor of all the lifeguards of all his resorts. But, she meets Victorino Gallardo, who's at that resort hiding out after the deaths of the Victorinos, and persuades her to marry then kill Mr. Crosweit, and each split the inheritance half and half. She would later deceive Victorino but decides to go forward with the plan to marry and then kill him for the money.

The third Victorina, (Victorina Cruz), ran away from her hometown with her younger sister, to escape the murderer of her parents, whom wants her or her sister as his wife, she later gets mistaken as a criminal, meets a prisoner (Lucia), who suggests she should be a boxer, due to her fighting skills. She would coincidentally move in with Lina Maria, Karen and Amparo (Victorino Mora's family) who had a vacant room available.

At the end, this prophecy and seemingly any other possible prophecy becomes averted by the success of a ritual performed by Phillip duMonde (the professor who was the assistant to the fortune-teller mentioned earlier), Martina Manjarres (Victorino Manjarres' mother) and Victorina Salinas, where they successfully follow the scrolled instruction, and essentially turned away death. As a result, none of the Victorinas were killed for falling in love with a Victorino.

The 2nd Victorino (Victorino Gallardo) is killed by being shot four times in the torso by the 3rd Victorino (Victorino Manjarres), whom that same day was reinstated into the police, but, since this death was not as a result of a Victorina falling in love, this death does not count as a result of the prophecy. Manjarres then updates us a month after the killing.

Victorina Fernandez does not succeed with the attempt on Mr. Crosweit's life and her and Marcos (Victorina Salinas' ex-fiancé and later revealed as Mr. Crosweit's pilot) get arrested by the police, Victorina for the assassination attempt on Mr. Crosweit, and Marcos for attempting to help her leave the country.

The rest of the events, take place, months later as Victorina Cruz, in a sense coming full circle, meets the woman she met in the jail (Lucia) for the country's championship and defeats her and then later, wins the world title.

Victorina Salinas marries Victorino Manjarres on their 25th birthday (November 11, 2010), (as it's also revealed that all the Victorinos and Victorinas were born on the same exact day, November 11, 1985, as it was assumed that the Victorinos shared a birthday and the Victorinas shared a birthday, but not that both sets shared the same birthday) and Victorina ends up getting pregnant, expecting a boy.

And, in the end Victorino Manjarres gets promoted for his work with the destruction of Victorino Gallardo and his "Clan Gallardo" and is the new captain, with the possibility of being promoted to his ultimate goal, as stated in the early episodes of the serial, and fulfilling his father's dream of being a general.

== Ratings ==
Telemundo set a ratings record for the debut of its new telenovela, Victorinos. Based on final Nielsen ratings, the show, an original Telemundo production, which aired from 10 p.m. to 11 p.m., averaged 995,000 adult 18-49 viewers, making it the Spanish-language net’s highest-rated original 10 p.m. premiere in network history.

== Cast ==
Main Cast In Order of Appearance:

Actor/actress	Character
Mauricio Ochmann	Victorino Mora
Arap Bethke	Victorino Gallardo
Roberto Manrique	Victorino Manjarres
Silvia de Dios	Angela Riquelme de Gallardo
Juan Carlos Salazar	Alejandro Gallardo
Noelle Schönwald	Martina de Manjarrés
Gustavo Angarita Jr.	Efraín Manjarrés
Claudia Liliana González	Lina María Céspedes
Juanita Humar	Amparo
Norma Nivia	Cristina
Carina Cruz	Claudia García
Linda Baldrich	Karen Hernández
Mauricio Bastidas	Emerson Hernández
Julián Farietta	Camilo Hernández
Teresa Gutiérrez (actress)	Aurora
Ricardo Gomez Escobar	Georgie
Isabel Cristina Estrada	Gloria Pérez
Francisco Bolívar	Victorino Pérez
Sebastián Boscán	Francisco/Franchesca Pérez
Mijail Mulkay	Julian Pérez
Lucho Velasco	Victor Hugo Mora
Ximena Duque	Diana Gallardo
Jessica Sanjuán	Julieta Manjarrés
Maria Margarita Giraldo	Aurora
Gary Forero	Rafael Hernández
Julio Cesar Mora	....
Ilja Rosendahl	Boxing Trainer
Pedro Perez	Victorino Gallardo
Carolina Sepúlveda	Victorina Salinas
Sara Corrales	Victorina Fernandez
Jacqueline Marquez	Victorina Cruz
Eileen Abad	Lucía
Evelin Santos	Carolina
Ramiro Meneses	Tanatos
Oscar Borda	Pantera
Edgardo Román	Cervantes
Sasha Molina	....
Freddy Ordóñez	Antonio Robayo
Gustavo Corredor	Miguel Angel Crosweit
David Guerrero	Oscar

== Broadcasting ==
Country	TV network(s)	Series premiere	Series end
United States	Telemundo	June 23, 2009	February 5, 2010
Croatia	RTL Televizija	June 24, 2010	Canceled
Nicaragua	Canal 2	2010	February, 2011
Argentina	Canal 9	2009	2010
Venezuela	Televen	2010	2010
