= List of American telenovelas =

Telenovelas (meaning soap operas in Spanish) are a type of genre within tv shows, specifically Spanish-language television serial dramas, often with a focus on romantic relationships and dramatic storylines. The term "telenovela" is a combination of "tele" (from "televisión") and "novela" (meaning "novel" or "serial drama").

Telemundo was the first television channel broadcasting telenovelas, and Univision soon followed in the 1990s. Over the years, these two television networks have made co-productions with other countries including Venezuela, Mexico, Colombia and Chile. Telemundo and Univision are sister channels with Venevisión and Televen, Venezuelan channels that have broadcast and produced their telenovelas for many years. Caracol Televisión is another sister channel of Telemundo.

Below is a list of all the telenovelas produced by Telemundo and Univision:

== 1980s ==
| # | Year | Title | Created by | Network | Source |
|---|---|---|---|---|---|
| 01 | 1988 | Angélica, mi vida | Ángel del Cerro | Telemundo | |
| 02 | 1989 | El magnate | Manoel Carlos | Telemundo | |

== 1990s ==
| # | Year | Title | Created by | Network | Source |
|---|---|---|---|---|---|
| 03 | 1991 | Cadena braga | Manoel Carlos | Telemundo | |
| 04 | 1992 | Marielena | Ángel del Cerro | Telemundo | |
| 05 | 1993 | Tres destinos | Delia Fiallo | Telemundo | |
| 06 | 1993 | Guadalupe | Ángel del Cerro | Telemundo | |
| 07 | 1993 | El peñón del amaranto | Delia Fiallo | Telemundo | |
| 08 | 1994 | Señora tentación | Salvador Jarabo | Telemundo | |
| 09 | 1994 | Morelia | Delia Fiallo | Univision | |
| 10 | 1997 | Aguamarina | Leonardo Padrón | Telemundo | |
| 11 | 1997 | María Celina | Frank Bonilla | Univision | |
| 12 | 1998 | La mujer de mi vida | Mariela Romero | Univision | |
| 13 | 1999 | Me muero por ti | J. F. Cascales | Telemundo | |
| 14 | 1999 | Enamorada | Mariela Romero | Univision | |

== 2000s ==
| # | Year | Title | Created by | Network | Source |
|---|---|---|---|---|---|
| 15 | 2000 | La Revancha | Mariela Romero | Univision | |
| 16 | 2001 | Cara o cruz | Eliseo Alberto | Telemundo | |
| 17 | 2001 | Secreto de amor | Alberto Gómez | Univision | |
| 18 | 2001 | Amantes del desierto | Humberto "Kiko" Olivieri | Telemundo | |
| 19 | 2001 | Adrián está de visita | Julio Jiménez | Telemundo | |
| 20 | 2002 | Gata Salvaje | Alberto Gómez | Univision | |
| 21 | 2002 | Te amaré en silencio | Alberto Gómez | Univision | |
| 22 | 2002 | Daniela | Javier Patrón | Telemundo | |
| 23 | 2002 | Vale todo | Yves Dumont | Telemundo | |
| 24 | 2002 | La venganza | Humberto "Kiko" Olivieri | Telemundo | |
| 25 | 2003 | Rebeca | Alberto Gómez | Univision | |
| 26 | 2003 | Ángel Rebelde | Alberto Gómez | Univision | |
| 27 | 2003 | Sofía dame tiempo | Juan Andrés Granados | Telemundo | |
| 28 | 2003 | Ladrón de corazones | Walter Doehner | Telemundo | |
| 29 | 2003 | Amor descarado | Roberto Stopello | Telemundo | |
| 30 | 2003 | Ángel de la guarda, mi dulce compañía | Adriana Barreto | Telemundo | |
| 31 | 2003 | Pasión de gavilanes | Julio Jiménez | Telemundo | |
| 32 | 2003 | El alma herida | Luis Zelkowicz | Telemundo | |
| 33 | 2004 | Inocente de ti | Carlos Romero | Univision | |
| 34 | 2004 | Soñar no Cuesta Nada | Verónica Suárez | Univision | |
| 35 | 2004 | Prisionera | Humberto "Kiko" Olivieri | Telemundo | |
| 36 | 2004 | Gitanas | Sergio Bravo | Telemundo | |
| 37 | 2004 | Te voy a enseñar a querer | Carlos Fernández De Soto | Telemundo | |
| 38 | 2004 | ¡Anita, no te rajes! | Valentina Párraga | Telemundo | |
| 39 | 2004 | La mujer en el espejo | Ricardo Suárez | Telemundo | |
| 40 | 2005 | El amor no tiene precio | María Antonieta "Calú" Gutiérrez | Univision | |
| 41 | 2005 | Olvidarte Jamás | Verónica Suárez | Univision | |
| 42 | 2005 | La ley del silencio | Juana Uribe | Telemundo | |
| 43 | 2005 | Los plateados | Víctor Carrasco | Telemundo | |
| 44 | 2005 | Amarte así, Frijolito | Bethel Flores | Telemundo | |
| 45 | 2005 | El cuerpo del deseo | Julio Jiménez | Telemundo | |
| 46 | 2005 | La Tormenta | Humberto "Kico" Olivieri | Telemundo | |
| 47 | 2006 | Mi Vida Eres Tú | Verónica Suárez | Univision | |
| 48 | 2006 | Las dos caras de Ana | Pablo Serra | Univision | |
| 49 | 2006 | Acorralada | Alberto Gómez | Univision | |
| 50 | 2006 | Tierra de Pasiones | Eric Vonn | Telemundo | |
| 51 | 2006 | Dueña y señora | Balmore Moreno | Telemundo | |
| 52 | 2006 | Amores de Mercado | Rodolfo Hoyos | Telemundo | |
| 53 | 2006 | La viuda de Blanco | Julio Jiménez | Telemundo | |
| 54 | 2006 | Marina | Alberto Gómez | Telemundo | |
| 55 | 2007 | Bajo las riendas del amor | Katia Ramírez Estrada | Univision | |
| 56 | 2007 | Amor comprado | Verónica Suárez | Univision | |
| 57 | 2007 | El Zorro, la espada y la rosa | Humberto "Kico" Olivieri | Telemundo | |
| 58 | 2007 | Dame chocolate | Perla Farías | Telemundo | |
| 59 | 2007 | Sin vergüenza | Isamar Hernández | Telemundo | |
| 60 | 2007 | Madre Luna | Julio Jiménez | Telemundo | |
| 61 | 2007 | Pecados ajenos | Eric Vonn | Telemundo | |
| 62 | 2007 | Victoria | Jimena Romero | Telemundo | |
| 63 | 2008 | Valeria | Alberto Gómez | Univision | |
| 64 | 2008 | Alma Indomable | Alberto Gómez | Univision | |
| 65 | 2008 | La traición | José Fernando Pérez | Telemundo | |
| 66 | 2008 | Sin senos no hay paraíso | Caridad Bravo Adams | Telemundo | |
| 67 | 2008 | El Juramento | Isamar Hernández | Telemundo | |
| 68 | 2008 | Doña Bárbara | Rómulo Gallegos | Telemundo | |
| 69 | 2008 | El Rostro de Analía | Humberto "Kiko" Olivieri | Telemundo | |
| 70 | 2009 | Pecadora | Verónica Suárez | Univision | |
| 71 | 2009 | Más sabe el diablo | Jimena Romero | Telemundo | |
| 72 | 2009 | Victorinos | Gustavo Bolívar | Telemundo | |
| 73 | 2009 | Niños ricos, pobres padres | Darren Star | Telemundo | |
| 74 | 2009 | Bella calamidades | Julio Jiménez | Telemundo | |

== 2010s ==
| # | Year | Title | Created by | Network | Source |
|---|---|---|---|---|---|
| 75 | 2010 | Sacrificio de Mujer | Carlos Pérez Santos | Univision | |
| 76 | 2010 | Eva Luna | Alex Hadad | Univision | |
| 77 | 2010 | Perro amor | Juana Uribe | Telemundo | |
| 78 | 2010 | El Clon | Gloria Pérez | Telemundo | |
| 79 | 2010 | ¿Dónde está Elisa? | Perla Farías | Telemundo | |
| 80 | 2010 | El fantasma de Elena | Humberto "Kico" Olivieri | Telemundo | |
| 81 | 2010 | La diosa coronada | Juan Camilo Ferrand | Telemundo | |
| 82 | 2010 | Alguien te mira | Pablo Illanes | Telemundo | |
| 83 | 2010 | Aurora | Marcela Citterio | Telemundo | |
| 84 | 2010 | Ojo por ojo | Laura Restrepo | Telemundo | |
| 85 | 2011 | Corazón Apasionado | Alberto Gómez | Univision | |
| 86 | 2011 | Los herederos del Monte | Julio Jiménez | Telemundo | |
| 87 | 2011 | La Reina del Sur | Arturo Pérez-Reverte | Telemundo | |
| 88 | 2011 | La casa de al lado | José Ignacio Valenzuela | Telemundo | |
| 89 | 2011 | Amar de nuevo | Enrique Torres | Telemundo | |
| 90 | 2011 | Flor Salvaje | Perla Farías | Telemundo | |
| 91 | 2012 | El Talismán | Verónica Suárez | Univision | |
| 92 | 2012 | ¿Quién eres tú? | Jimena Romero | Univision | |
| 93 | 2012 | Rosario | Alex Hadad | Univision | |
| 94 | 2012 | Relaciones peligrosas | Roberto Stopello | Telemundo | |
| 95 | 2012 | Corazón valiente | Marcela Citterio | Telemundo | |
| 96 | 2012 | Rosa diamante | Enrique Óscar Torres | Telemundo | |
| 97 | 2012 | El rostro de la venganza | Sebastián Arrau | Telemundo | |
| 98 | 2013 | Los secretos de Lucía | Jörg Hiller | Univision | |
| 99 | 2013 | La Madame | Nubia Barreto | Univision | |
| 100 | 2013 | Cosita Linda | Nora Castillo | Univision | |
| 101 | 2013 | La Patrona | Valentina Párraga | Telemundo | |
| 102 | 2013 | Pasión prohibida | Juan Camilo Ferrand | Telemundo | |
| 103 | 2013 | El Señor de los Cielos (season 1) | Andrés López | Telemundo | |
| 104 | 2013 | Dama y obrero | José Ignacio Valenzuela | Telemundo | |
| 105 | 2013 | Marido en alquiler | Perla Farias | Telemundo | |
| 106 | 2013 | Santa Diabla | José Ignacio Valenzuela | Telemundo | |
| 107 | 2014 | La impostora | Sebastián Arrau | Telemundo | |
| 108 | 2014 | En otra piel | Laura Sosa | Telemundo | |
| 109 | 2014 | La viuda negra | Yesmer Uribe | Univision | |
| 110 | 2014 | Camelia la Texana | Diego Ramón Bravo | Telemundo | |
| 111 | 2014 | Reina de corazones | Marcela Citterio | Telemundo | |
| 112 | 2014 | El Señor de los Cielos (season 2) | Andrés López | Telemundo | |
| 113 | 2014 | Voltea pa' que te enamores | Monica Montañez | Univision | |
| 114 | 2014 | Señora Acero | Roberto Stopello | Telemundo | |
| 115 | 2014 | Los miserables | Victor Hugo | Telemundo | |
| 116 | 2014 | Villa paraíso | Alex Hadad | Telemundo | |
| 117 | 2014 | Tierra de reyes | Julio Jiméne | Telemundo | |
| 118 | 2014 | Demente criminal | Ibéyise Pacheco | UniMás | |
| 118 | 2015 | Dueños del paraíso | Pablo Illanes | Telemundo | |

== See also ==
- List of telenovelas of Telemundo
- List of telenovelas of Univision
