= List of Telemundo telenovelas and series =

Telemundo is an American television network owned by NBCUniversal and its first telenovela was created in 1988. Through the years Telemundo has been associated with several foreign chains such as Caracol Televisión some of their telenovelas higher production have been Corazón Valiente produced in 2012, the first soap opera that won the Premios Tu Mundo, was Mi Corazón Insiste en Lola Volcán.

The following is a chronological list of telenovelas and television series produced by Telemundo:

== 1988–99 ==
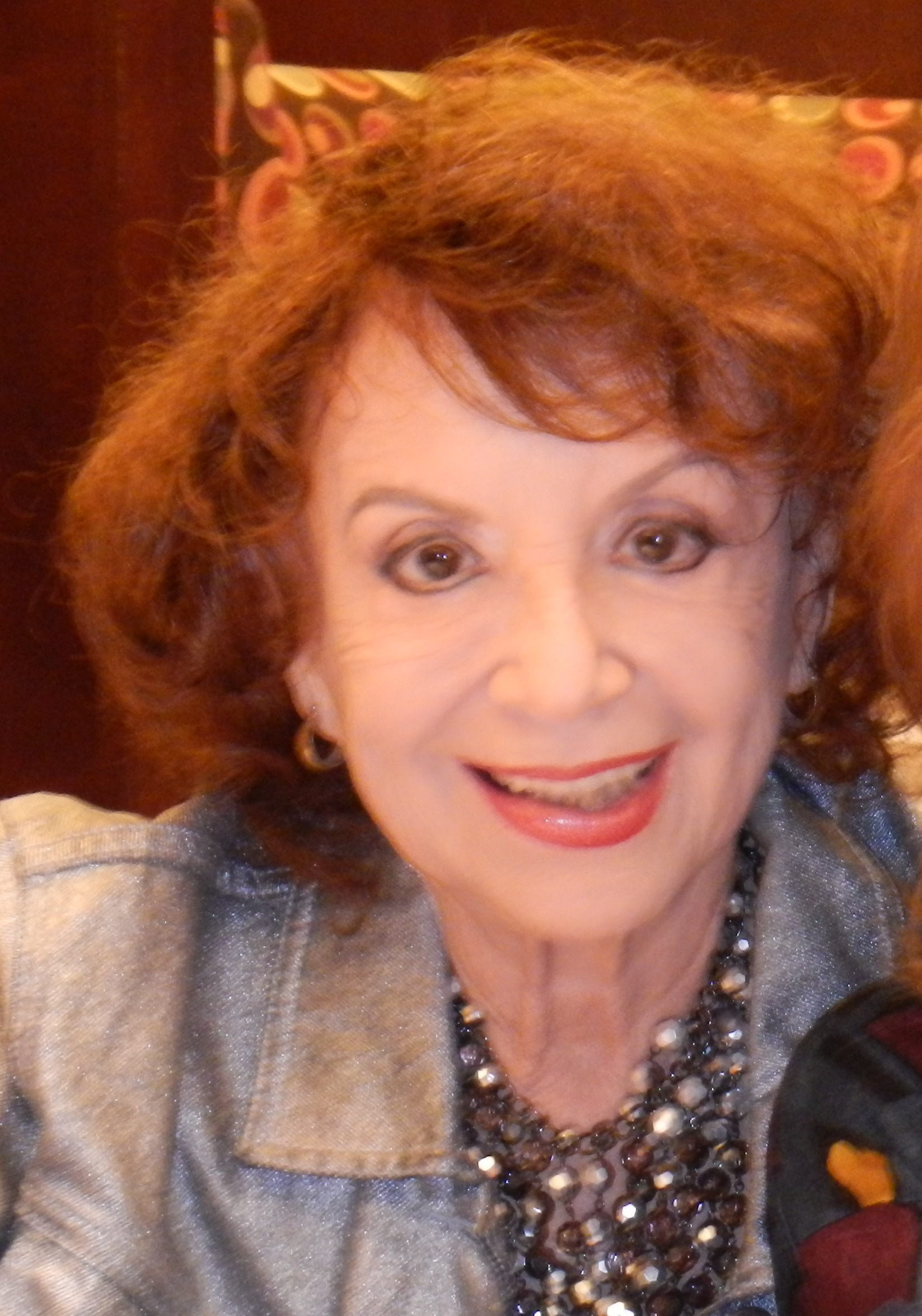
Delia Fiallo is the original author of Guadalupe and Marielena.

No.	Year	Title	Author	Director	Ref.
1	1988	Angélica, mi vida	Ángel del Cerro	Grazio D'Angelo	
2	1990	El magnate	Manoel Carlos	Rodolfo Hoppe	
3	1991	Cadena braga	Unknown writer	Alfonso Rodríguez	
4	1992	Marielena	Delia Fiallo	Rodolfo Hoppe	
5	1993	Tres destinos	Ángel del Cerro	Ibrahim Guerra	
6	1993	Guadalupe	Delia Fiallo	Grazio D'Angelo	
7	1993	El peñón del amaranto	Salvador Jarabo	Alfredo Saldaña	
8	1994	Señora tentación	Ángel del Cerro	Enrique Gómez Vadillo	
9	1997	Aguamarina	Leonardo Padrón	José Antonio Ferrara	
10	1999	Me muero por ti	J.F. Cascales	Pepe Sánchez	

== 2000s ==
Year	Title	Author	Ref.
2001	Cara o cruz	Eliseo Alberto and Luis Zelkowicz	
2001	Amantes del desierto	Julio Jiménez and Humberto "Kiko" Olivieri	
2001	Adrián está de visita	Julio Jiménez	
2002	Daniela	Javier Patrón	
2002	Vale todo	Yves Dumont	
2002	La venganza	Humberto "Kiko" Olivieri	
2003	Sofía dame tiempo	Juan Andrés Granados	
2003	Ladrón de corazones	Walter Doehner	
2003	Amor Descarado	Roberto Stopello	
2003	Ángel de la guarda, mi dulce compañía	Adriana Barreto	
2003	Pasión de Gavilanes	Julio Jiménez	
2003	El alma herida	Luis Zelkowicz	
2003	Los Teens	Juliana Agosto	
2004	Prisionera	Humberto "Kiko" Olivieri	
2004	Gitanas	n/a	
2004	Zapata: Amor en rebeldía	Leticia López Margalli	
2004	Te voy a enseñar a querer	Carlos Fernández De Soto	
2004	Anita no te rajes	Valentina Párraga	
2004	La mujer en el espejo	Ricardo Suárez	
2005	La ley del silencio	Juana Uribe	
2005	Los plateados	Víctor Carrasco	
2005	Amarte así, Frijolito	Enrique Torres	
2005	El Cuerpo del Deseo	Julio Jiménez	
2005	La Tormenta	Humberto "Kico" Olivieri	
2005	Corazón Partido	Pablo Illanes	
2006	Tierra de Pasiones	Eric Vonn	
2006	Dueña y señora	Balmore Moreno	
2006	Amores de mercado	Rodolfo Hoyos	
2006	La viuda de Blanco	Julio Jiménez	
2006	Marina	Alberto Gómez	
2007	El Zorro, la espada y la rosa	Humberto "Kico" Olivieri	
2007	Dame Chocolate	Perla Farías	
2007	Sin vergüenza	Isamar Hernández	
2007	Madre Luna	Julio Jiménez	
2007	Pecados ajenos	Eric Vonn	
2007	Victoria	Jimena Romero	
2008	La traición	José Fernando Pérez	
2008	Sin senos no hay paraíso	Gustavo Bolívar	
2008	El Juramento	Isamar Hernández	
2008	Doña Bárbara	Rómulo Gallegos and Valentina Párraga	
2008	El Rostro de Analía	Humberto "Kiko" Olivieri	
2009	Más sabe el diablo	Jimena Romero	
2009	Victorinos	Gustavo Bolívar	
2009	Niños Ricos, Pobres Padres	Darren Star	
2009	Bella calamidades	Julio Jiménez	

== 2010s ==
No.	Title	Season	Original release				Network	Ref.
No.	Title	Season	First aired	Viewers (millions)	Last aired	Viewers (millions)	Network	Ref.
2010
54	Perro amor	1 season, 129 episodes	11 January 2010	TBD	19 July 2010	TBD	Telemundo	
55	El clon	1 season, 183 episodes	15 February 2010	TBD	29 October 2010	TBD	Telemundo	
56	¿Dónde está Elisa?	1 season, 107 episodes	8 March 2010	TBD	10 August 2010	TBD	Telemundo	
57	El fantasma de Elena	1 season, 117 episodes	20 July 2010	TBD	7 January 2011	TBD	Telemundo	
58	La Diosa Coronada	1 season, 31 episodes	26 July 2010	TBD	7 September 2010	TBD	Telemundo	
59	Alguien te mira	1 season, 116 episodes	8 September 2010	TBD	25 February 2011	TBD	Telemundo	
60	Aurora	1 season, 135 episodes	1 November 2010	TBD	20 May 2011	TBD	Telemundo	
61	Eye for an Eye	1 season, 98 episodes	14 December 2010	TBD	3 May 2011	TBD	Telemundo	
2011
62	Los herederos del Monte	1 season, 128 episodes	10 January 2011	TBD	15 July 2011	TBD	Telemundo	
63	La Reina del Sur	3 seasons, 183 episodes	28 February 2011	Various (Note: For the rating of all seasons, see Ratings.)	16 January 2023	Various	Telemundo	
64	Mi corazón insiste en Lola Volcán	1 season, 133 episodes	23 May 2011	TBD	28 November 2011	TBD	Telemundo	
65	La casa de al lado	1 season, 165 episodes	31 May 2011	TBD	23 January 2012	TBD	Telemundo	
66	Amar de nuevo	1 season, 110 episodes	29 August 2011	TBD	24 February 2012	TBD	Telemundo	
67	Flor Salvaje	1 season, 150 episodes	2 August 2011	TBD	5 March 2012	TBD	Telemundo	
68	Una Maid en Manhattan	1 season, 168 episodes	29 November 2011	TBD	23 July 2012	TBD	Telemundo	
2012
69	Relaciones peligrosas	1 season, 108 episodes	24 January 2012	TBD	25 June 2012	TBD	Telemundo	
70	Corazón valiente	1 season, 206 episodes	6 March 2012	TBD	7 January 2013	TBD	Telemundo	
71	Rosa diamante	1 season, 129 episodes	10 July 2012	TBD	21 January 2013	TBD	Telemundo	
72	El rostro de la venganza	1 season, 173 episodes	30 July 2012	TBD	12 April 2013	TBD	Telemundo	
2013
73	La Patrona	1 season, 127 episodes	8 January 2013	TBD	9 July 2013	TBD	Telemundo	
74	Pasión prohibida	1 season, 107 episodes	22 January 2013	TBD	23 June 2013	TBD	Telemundo	
75	El Señor de los Cielos	10 seasons, 887 episodes	15 April 2013	Various (Note: For the rating of all seasons, see Ratings.)	12 November 2026	Various	Telemundo	
76	Dama y obrero	1 season, 115 episodes	24 June 2013	TBD	18 October 2013	TBD	Telemundo	
77	Marido en alquiler	1 season, 141 episodes	10 July 2013	TBD	13 January 2014	TBD	Telemundo	
78	Santa Diabla	1 season, 136 episodes	6 August 2013	TBD	24 February 2014	TBD	Telemundo	
2014
79	La impostora	1 season, 120 episodes	14 January 2014	TBD	3 July 2014	TBD	Telemundo	
80	En otra piel	1 season, 154 episodes	18 February 2014	TBD	29 September 2014	TBD	Telemundo	
81	Camelia la Texana	1 season, 60 episodes	25 February 2014	TBD	22 May 2014	TBD	Telemundo	
82	Reina de corazones	1 season, 140 episodes	28 April 2014	TBD	7 November 2014	TBD	Gala TV	
83	Señora Acero	5 season, 387 episodes	23 September 2014	Various (Note: For the rating of all seasons, see Ratings.)	29 January 2019	Various	Telemundo	
84	Los miserables	1 season, 119 episodes	30 September 2014	TBD	25 March 2015	TBD	Telemundo	
85	Villa Paraíso	1 season, 20 episodes	6 October 2014	TBD	31 October 2014	TBD	Telemundo	
86	Tierra de reyes	1 season, 160 episodes	2 December 2014	2.16	27 July 2015	2.39	Telemundo	
2015
87	Dueños del paraíso	1 season, 69 episodes	13 January 2015	TBD	20 April 2015	TBD	Telemundo	
88	Bajo el mismo cielo	1 season, 122 episodes	28 July 2015	1.71	25 January 2016	2.01	Telemundo	
89	Celia	1 season, 80 episodes	5 October 2015	TBD	8 February 2016	TBD	RCN Televisión	
90	¿Quién es quién?	1 season, 120 episodes	26 October 2015	TBD	8 April 2016	TBD	Gala TV	
2016
91	La querida del Centauro	2 seasons, 141 episodes	12 January 2016	1.85 (s. 1) 1.14 (s. 2)	24 July 2017	1.14 (s. 1) 1.46 (s. 2)	Telemundo	
92	Eva la trailera	1 season, 118 episodes	26 January 2016	TBD	15 July 2016	TBD	Telemundo	
93	Silvana sin lana	1 season, 121 episodes	19 July 2016	TBD	16 January 2017	TBD	Telemundo	
94	Sin senos sí hay paraíso	4 seasons, 240 episodes	19 July 2016	Various (Note: For the rating of all seasons, see Ratings.)	TBA	Various	Telemundo	
95	La Doña	2 season, 199 episodes	29 November 2016	1.85 (s. 1) 1.03 (s. 2)	27 April 2020	1.71 (s. 1) 1.19 (s. 2)	Telemundo	
2017
96	La Fan	1 season, 125 episodes (Note: Unlike its original broadcast, 125 episodes are available in the rest of the world.)	17 January 2017	1.46	3 April 2017	1.11	Telemundo	
97	Guerra de ídolos	1 season, 76 episodes	24 April 2017	1.03	23 August 2017	TBD (Note: Canceled its broadcast on television and moved to the official website of Telemundo and its App.)	Telemundo	
98	Mariposa de Barrio	1 season, 91 episodes	27 June 2017	1.63	6 November 2017	1.79	Telemundo	
99	Milagros de Navidad	1 season, 20 episodes	27 November 2017	1.07	22 December 2017	1.00	Telemundo	
100	Sangre de mi tierra	1 season, 59 episodes	29 November 2017	1.15	20 February 2018	1.46	Telemundo	
2018
101	José José, el príncipe de la canción	1 season, 60 episodes	15 January 2018	1.48	6 April 2018	0.89	Telemundo	
102	Al otro lado del muro	1 season, 78 episodes	21 February 2018	1.42	11 June 2018	1.48	Telemundo	
103	Enemigo íntimo	2 season, 113 episodes	21 February 2018	1.72 (s. 1) 0.96 (s. 2)	21 September 2020	1.63 (s. 1) 1.19 (s. 2)	Telemundo	
104	Mi familia perfecta	1 season, 69 episodes	9 April 2018	1.03	13 July 2018	0.96	Telemundo	
105	Luis Miguel: The Series	1 season, 13 episodes	22 April 2018	0.95 (s. 1)	Moved to Netflix for second season	0.74 (s. 1)	Telemundo	
106	Falsa identidad	2 seasons, 169 episodes	11 September 2018	1.58 (s. 1) 0.91 (s. 2)	25 January 2021	1.66 (s. 1)	Telemundo	
107	El secreto de Selena	1 season, 13 episodes	22 September 2018		16 December 2018		TNT	
108	The Inmate	1 season, 13 episodes	25 September 2018	1.54	11 October 2018	1.42	Telemundo	
109	Nicky Jam: El Ganador	1 season, 13 episodes	30 November 2018 (Available for worldwide, except for Telemundo)				Netflix	
2019
110	Playing with Fire	1 season, 10 episodes	22 January 2019	1.44	4 February 2019	1.24	Telemundo	
111	El Barón	1 season, 59 episodes	30 January 2019	1.03	25 April 2019	N/A (Note: Moved to the 1am/12c timeslot.)	Telemundo	
112	Betty en NY	1 season, 123 episodes	6 February 2019	1.37	12 August 2019	1.74	Telemundo	
113	Preso No. 1	1 season, 44 episodes	30 July 2019	1.33	27 September 2019	0.92	Telemundo	
114	El final del paraíso	1 season, 82 episodes	13 August 2019	1.30	10 December 2019	1.61	Telemundo	
115	You Cannot Hide	1 season, 10 episodes	30 September 2019	0.89	11 October 2019	0.82	Telemundo	
116	Decisiones: Unos ganan, otros pierden	1 season, 27 episodes	10 December 2019	0.91	17 January 2020	0.68	Telemundo	

== 2020s ==
No.	Title	Season	Original release				Network	Ref.
No.	Title	Season	First aired	Viewers (millions)	Last aired	Viewers (millions)	Network	Ref.
2020
117	Operación pacífico	1 season, 44 episodes	10 February 2020	0.91	17 April 2020	0.94	Telemundo	
118	100 días para enamorarnos	2 season, 92 episodes	28 April 2020	1.07 (s. 1)	Moved to Netflix for second season	0.96 (s. 1)	Telemundo	
2021
119	La suerte de Loli	1 season, 103 episodes	26 January 2021	1.50	21 June 2021	1.24	Telemundo	
120	Buscando a Frida	1 season, 84 episodes	26 January 2021	1.20	24 May 2021	1.48	Telemundo	
121	Malverde: El Santo Patrón	1 season, 80 episodes	28 September 2021	1.09	26 January 2022	1.06	Telemundo	
122	Parientes a la fuerza	1 season, 100 episodes	26 October 2021	0.99	21 March 2022	N/A	Telemundo	
2022
123	Diary of a Gigolo	1 season, 10 episodes	7 September 2022				Netflix	
124	'Til Jail Do Us Part	1 season, 8 episodes	15 September 2022				Peacock	
2023
125	Juego de mentiras	1 season, 76 episodes	7 March 2023	0.86	4 July 2023	N/A	Telemundo	
126	Vuelve a mí	1 season, 91 episodes	9 October 2023	0.74	16 February 2024	1.16	Telemundo	
127	El doctor del pueblo	1 season, 6 episodes	19 November 2023	0.43	TBA	TBD	Telemundo	
2024
128	El Conde: Amor y honor	1 season, 75 episodes	1 July 2024	N/A	21 October 2024	1.30	Telemundo	
129	La mujer de mi vida	1 season, 105 episodes	8 October 2024	N/A	19 December 2024	N/A	Nueve	
130	Sed de venganza	1 season, 83 episodes	15 October 2024	N/A	6 March 2025	N/A	Telemundo	
2025
131	La Jefa	1 season, 95 episodes	18 February 2025	N/A	11 July 2025	0.96	Telemundo	
132	Velvet: El nuevo imperio	1 season, 92 episodes	19 May 2025	1.29	24 September 2025	N/A	Telemundo	
133	Dinastía Casillas	1 season, 92 episodes	7 October 2025	1.32	16 February 2026	1.64	Telemundo	
2026
134	Lobo, morir matando	1 season 70 episodes	17 February 2026	N/A	9 June 2026	N/A	Telemundo	
Upcoming
TBD	Emergencias. Unidad de vida	TBD	TBA	TBD	TBA	TBA	Telemundo	
