= Kimberly Dos Ramos =

Venezuelan actress, entertainer and model

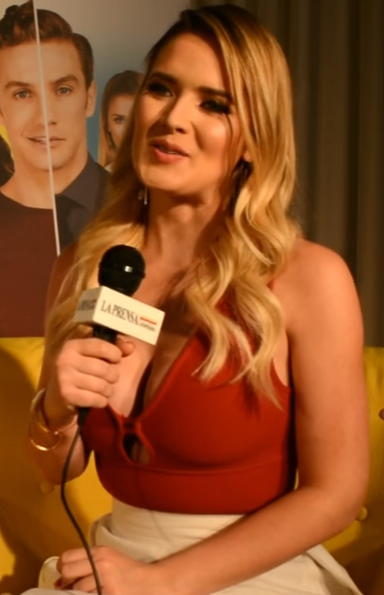
- Dos Ramos in an interview for ¿Quién es quién? in 2016
- Born: Kimberly Dos Ramos; April 15, 1992 (age 34); Caracas, Venezuela
- Occupations: Actress; model; dancer; television host

Kimberly Dos Ramos de Sousa (born April 15, 1992) is a Venezuelan actress. She is best known for her portrayal of Matilda Román in Nickelodeon's Grachi. She started her career in commercials and promotions for the Venezuelan television station Radio Caracas Television (RCTV). Dos Ramos played supporting roles in telenovelas produced by Venevisión and RCTV International, until she later gained recognition for her starring roles in successful telenovelas of Telemundo and Televisa.

== Early life ==
Dos Ramos was born in Venezuela to Portuguese parents on April 15, 1992. She has two brothers, Lance Dos Ramos, an actor and entertainer, and Lenny Dos Ramos, an actor. Dos Ramos became interested in acting at an early age. According to RCTV, Dos Ramos "interacted easily with the world of television," having already been exposed when her brothers went to auditions. As a child, Ramos appeared in various Venezuelan television programs, and at the age of four, she attended her first screen test.

== Career ==
=== Beginnings, acting and animation (2000–2009) ===
As a child actress, Dos Ramos appeared in the telenovelas Hechizo de amor, Más que amor, frenesí and Las González, all three created by Venevisión. In 2003, she marked her debut on RCTV in the telenovela La Cuaima in the supporting role of Bambi. In 2005, she was cast as Julieta in the telenovela Amor a palos. In 2008, she played the role of Eugenia in the RCTV telenovela La Trepadora, inspired by the 1925 novel of the same title by Rómulo Gallegos. During her career in RCTV, she shared credits with fellow actor Gabriel López.

In 2009, Dos Ramos worked as an animator for the RCTV comedy program Loco video loco.

=== Que el cielo me explique and Grachi (2010–2012) ===
Dos Ramos returned to acting in late 2009 to play the role of Karen in what would be the last production of RCTV International, Que el cielo me explique. Filming for the telenovela began in December 2009, but was broadcast the next year on the Televen channel due to the blockage of RCTV in Venezuela. Que el cielo me explique was met with positive reviews from the Venezuelan and foreign audience. After filming for Que el cielo me explique concluded, Dos Ramos had several units in different auditions for the cast of Grachi, a teen fantasy series for Nickelodeon Latin America. She landed the role of Matilda Román, the arch-rival of Grachi Alonso (Isabella Castillo).

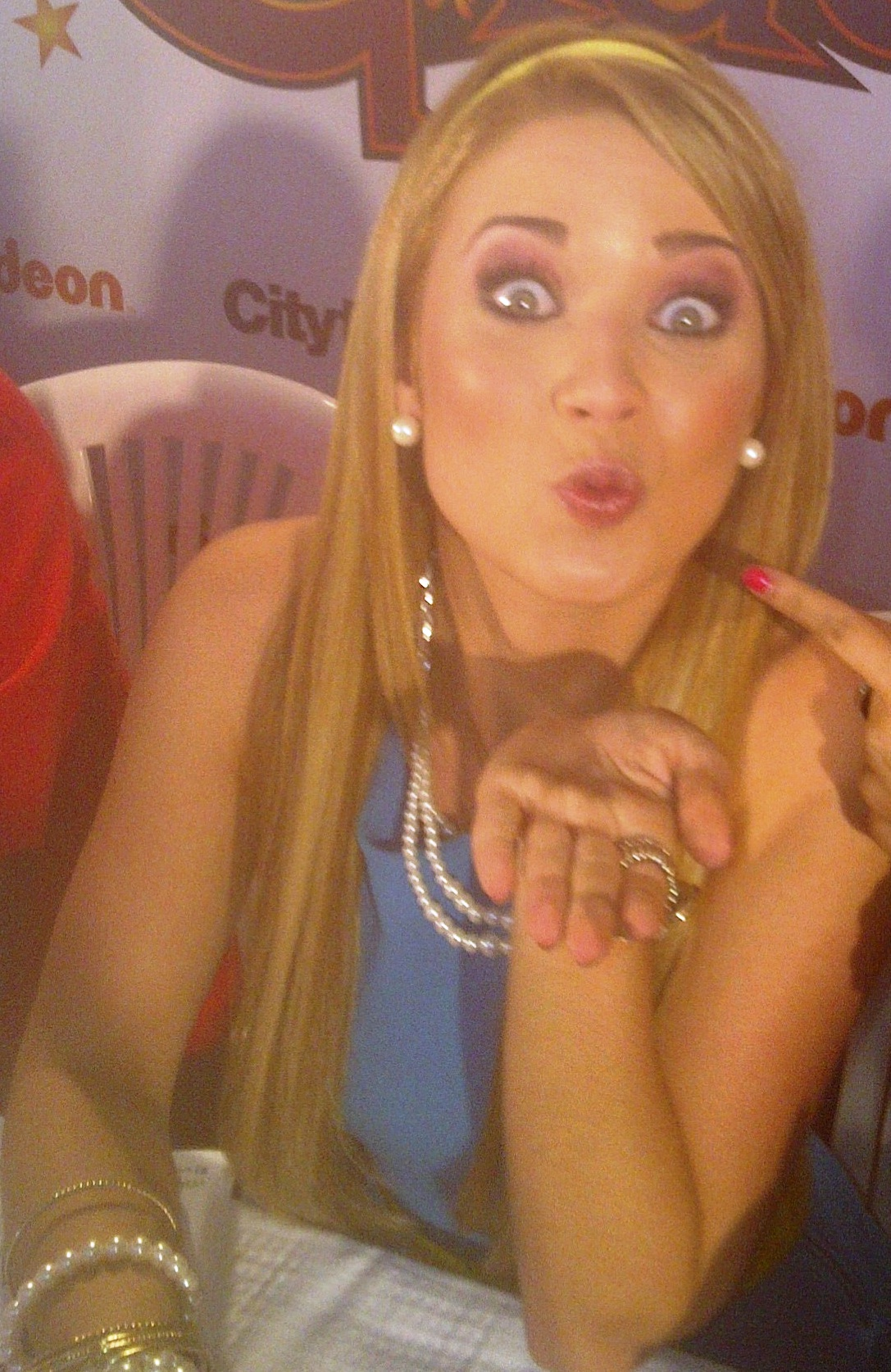
Dos Ramos in an autograph signing at Bogotá, Colombia.

In Grachi, Matilda is a wealthy, spoiled and capricious girl who uses her powers to do bad things, and she also likes to dance and sing. Dos Ramos shared credits with her brother Lance Dos Ramos, who played the character José Manuel "Chema" Esquivel. She also participated in castings for the American adaptation of Spanish telenovela Física o Química, but was not selected. As part of the Grachi cast, she took part in recording the series' soundtrack album titled La vida es maravillosamente mágica. The album debuted at number twenty in the ranking of best-selling albums in Mexico and at number four in Argentina, where it remained for thirteen weeks. She participated in several promotional tours throughout Latin America with the main cast. Dos Ramos also performed songs for the Grachi soundtrack album titled La vida es maravillosamente mágica, Volume 2. She was also part of the musical tour Grachi: El show en vivo that traveled in some Latin American countries. From February 10, 2012, Dos Ramos and the rest of Grachi cast started a live musical tour based on the series. The live show was a commercial success, and positively received by the audience and critics. The second season of Grachi premiered on February 27, 2012, on Nickelodeon Latin America. In mid-April 2012, Dos Ramos traveled to Rome, Italy with the cast of Grachi to promote the series' second season.

=== Artistic growth and Telemundo era (2012–2015) ===
Dos Ramos was going to reprise her role in the third season of Grachi as part of Nickelodeon Latin America's 2013 programming. On June 20, 2012, it was announced that Dos Ramos had been cast in the Telemundo telenovela El rostro de la venganza. She confirmed the news on her Twitter account and that she would not participate in the third season of Grachi.

El rostro de la venganza marked the debut of Dos Ramos in Telemundo. She played the supporting role of Katerina, the youngest daughter of the Alvarado family. Her acting performance in the telenovela was praised by the Latin American media. In 2013, Dos Ramos joined the cast of the family-themed telenovela Marido en alquiler with Sonya Smith, Juan Soler and Maritza Rodríguez. She shared credits with Gabriel Coronel.

Her major breakthrough role came when Dos Ramos starred in the hit Telemundo telenovela Tierra de reyes, based on the successful Pasión de Gavilanes, starring Aarón Díaz, Ana Lorena Sánchez, Gonzalo García Vivanco, Scarlet Gruber, Daniela Navarro, Christian de la Campa and Fabián Ríos. She portrayed the character of Irina, youngest of the three Del Junco sisters who deeply falls in love with Flavio (García Vivanco), one of the three Gallardo brothers. In this project, Dos Ramos worked again with Sonya Smith who played as her mother after "Marido en Alquiler", and reunite with Grachi lead star Isabella Castillo.

Later on, she was cast in ¿Quién es quién?, an adaptation of Amor Descarado, starring Eugenio Siller in a double role alongside Danna Paola and Jonathan Islas.

=== Televisa and Univision era (2016-2021) ===
Dos Ramos transferred to Televisa in 2016. In her first project with the network, she landed her breakthrough role portraying the antagonist Graciela in Vino el amor with Irina Baeva, Gabriel Soto, Cynthia Klitbo and Azela Robinson. She was reunited with Christian de la Campa who also plays an antagonist role in this telenovela.

In 2018, Dos Ramos was cast in the legal drama Por amar sin ley as Sofía, a lawyer who joins the Vega y Asociados law firm. She made her first appearance in the first season finale episode, serving as a series regular in the second season.

Dos Ramos portrayed a different version of Maribel de la Fuente in the 2020 reboot of Rubí, the latest remake of the 2004 hit Mexican telenovela of the same title.

In 2021, Dos Ramos starred as Isabela Gallardo in her most noted telenovela to date, the highly-successful La desalmada, featuring a large ensemble cast headed by Livia Brito, José Ron, Eduardo Santamarina, and many more. La desalmada marked the anticipated reunion between Dos Ramos and Gonzalo García Vivanco who previously paired together in Tierra de reyes.

=== Recent projects (2023-present) ===
In 2023, Dos Ramos returned to Telemundo for an antagonist role in the telenovela Vuelve a mí, starring William Levy and Samadhi Zendejas and working again with Christian de la Campa. She played as Liana Corrales, a strong and perfectionist woman with a dark past.

In October 2023, it was announced that Dos Ramos will play her very first lead role in Televisa for the 2024 telenovela Vivir de amor, starring alongside Gala Montes and Emmanuel Palomares.

== Public image and personal life ==
Dos Ramos received the title of "teen idol" for her performance as Matilda in Grachi. Her fans are called "Kimysta[s]".

She has expressed a desire to study business and to have a career working with numbers. According to Dos Ramos, her family is very important in her career because "without their support, I would not be here right now. My mom is always with me in all recordings, her companionship is fundamental".

Dos Ramos also admits to being a perfectionist. Her favourite food is pasta and she loves "all kinds of music".

She has received two nominations in consecutive years (2011 and 2012), and four in total, as "Despicable" in the Nickelodeon Latin America Kids Choice awards in Mexico and Argentina, as well as a nomination as "Gata do Ano" (girl of the year) in Brazil. Currently, she is studying Business Administration, and says she is single.

=== Influences ===
Dos Ramos' major influences in her career are actors Daniela Alvarado, Emma Rabbe, Diego Boneta, Johnny Depp, Natalie Portman, Thalia, Édgar Ramírez and Saúl Lisazo.

== Filmography ==
=== Film ===
Year	Title	Role	Notes
2015	Los Ocho	Diana	Short film

=== Television roles ===
Year	Title	Role	Notes
2000	Hechizo de amor	Martica Sánchez	Supporting role
2001	Más que amor, frenesí	Anastasia "Taty" Lara Fajardo	Supporting role
2002	Las González	Petunia Piña González	Supporting role
2003–2004	La Cuaima	Bambi Cáceres Rovaina	Supporting role
2005–2006	Amor a palos	Julieta Soriano Lam	Supporting role
2008	La Trepadora	Eugenia Alcoy del Casal	Supporting role
2011	Que el cielo me explique	Karen Montero	Supporting role
2011–2012	Grachi	Matilda Román	Main role (seasons 1–2)
2012–2013	El rostro de la venganza	Katerina Alvarado	Supporting role
2013–2014	Marido en alquiler	Patricia Ibarra Palmer	Main role
2014–2015	Tierra de reyes	Irina del Junco Belmonte	Lead role
2015–2016	¿Quién es quién?	Fernanda Manrique / Isabela Blanco	Lead role
2016–2017	Vino el amor	Graciela Palacios	Main role
2018–2019	Por amar sin ley	Sofía Alcócer	Special guest star (season 1); Main role (season 2)
2020	Rubí	Maribel de la Fuente	Main role
2021	La desalmada	Isabela Gallardo Torreblanca	Main role
2023–2024	Vuelve a mí	Liana Corrales	Main role
2024	Vivir de amor	Angelli del Olmo Sandoval	Lead role
2025	Me atrevo a amarte	Victoria Pérez-Soler Paz	Lead role
2026	Guardián de mi vida	Grecia Diamanto	Main role

== Discography ==
- Grachi: La vida es maravillosamente mágica, Volume 2 (2012)

== Awards and nominations ==
Year	Award	Category	Telenovela	Result
2011	Kids Choice Awards México	Favorite Villain	Grachi	Nominated
2011	Kids' Choice Awards Argentina	Favorite Villain	Grachi	Nominated
2012	Los Premios el Universo del Espectáculo	TV – Best Youth Performance	Que el cielo me explique	Nominated
2012	Kids Choice Awards México	Favorite Villain	Grachi	Nominated
2012	Kids' Choice Awards Argentina	Favorite Villain	Grachi	Nominated
2012	Meus Prêmios Nick Brasil	Girl of the Year	Grachi	Nominated
2012	Twitter Awards	Miss Tweet	Herself	Nominated
2013	Miami Life Awards	TV – Best Supporting Actress in a Telenovela	El rostro de la venganza	Won
2013	Premios Tu Mundo 2013	Best Supporting Actress	El rostro de la venganza	Nominated
2013	Premios People en Español	Best Supporting Actress	Marido en alquiler	Nominated
2015	Miami Life Awards	Best Young Actress in a Telenovela	Tierra de reyes	Won
2015	Premios Tu Mundo	I'm Sexy and I Know it	Tierra de reyes	Won
