= Santiago Apóstol (film) =

- Theatrical release poster
- Directed by: Alan Coton
- Written by: Sandra Becerril
- Produced by: Jose Manuel Brandariz
- Starring: Julián Gil
- Cinematography: Juan Carlos Lazo
- Edited by: Sebastián Elizondo
- Music by: Jaime Cardona
- Production company: Beverly Hills Entertainment
- Release date: 14 April 2017 (Spain)
- Country: Spain
- Language: Spanish

Santiago Apóstol is a 2017 Spain film directed by Alan Coton and it stars Julián Gil. The film is based on the life of Santiago Apóstol. It premiered on April 14, 2017 in Spain.

== Plot ==
The film is based on the life of the apostle Santiago, from his birth, his encounter with Jesus, his evangelization through Hispania, until his death in the year 44, and ends when his body arrives in Galicia.

== Cast ==
- Julián Gil as Santiago
- Jorge Aravena as Josías de Judá
- Alexis Ayala as Brujo Hermogenes
- Marcelo Córdoba as San Pedro
- Christian de la Campa as Torcuato Cansato
- Marco de Paula as Atanasio
- Scarlet Gruber as Princess Viria
- Roberto Manrique as San Juan
- Ana Obregón as Reina Loba
- Scarlet Ortiz as María de Nazareth
- Alex Sirvent as Teodoro
- Aroldo Betancourt as Fileto
- Ana Lorena Sánchez as María Magdalena
- Salvador Zerboni as Judas
- José Narváez as Jesus
- Julio Pereira
