= 4th Your World Awards =

Annual US media awards show

2015 Premios Tu Mundo
- Date: August 20, 2015
- Location: American Airlines Arena in Miami, Florida
- Country: United States
- Hosted by: Raúl González; Angélica Vale

Television/radio coverage
- Network: Telemundo

2015 Your World Awards is the four annual award hosted by Telemundo, which awarded prizes to the beauty, sports, music and telenovela. It aired on August 20, 2015, at 7pm/6c.

== Winners and nominees ==
=== Telenovelas / Súper Series ===
Novela of the Year	Súper Serie of the Year
Tierra de reyes; Los miserables; Reina de corazones	El Señor de los Cielos 3; Dueños del Paraíso; Señora Acero
Favorite Lead Actress	Favorite Lead Actress of Súper Series
Scarlet Gruber for Tierra de reyes; Ana Lorena Sánchez for Tierra de reyes; Kimberly Dos Ramos for Tierra de reyes; Paola Núñez for Reina de corazones; Aracely Arámbula for Los miserables	Fernanda Castillo for El Señor de los Cielos; Blanca Soto for Señora Acero; Kate del Castillo for Dueños del paraíso; Carmen Villalobos for El Señor de los Cielos
Favorite Lead Actor	Favorite Lead Actor of Súper Series
Christian de la Campa for Tierra de reyes; Aarón Díaz for Tierra de reyes; Gonzalo García Vivanco for Tierra de reyes; Eugenio Siller for Reina de corazones; Erik Hayser for Los miserables	Rafael Amaya for El Señor de los Cielos; Andrés Palacios for Señora Acero; Jorge Zabaleta for Dueños del paraíso; José María Torre for Dueños del paraíso
The Best Bad Girl	The Best Bad Girl of Súper Series
Cynthia Olavarría for Tierra de reyes; Aylin Mujica for Los miserables; Catherine Siachoque for Reina de corazones; Sonya Smith for Tierra de reyes	Carmen Aub for El Señor de los Cielos; Luciana Silveyra for Señora Acero; Margarita Muñoz for Dueños del paraíso; Ximena Duque for Dueños del paraíso
The Best Bad Boy	The Best Bad Boy of Súper Series
Fabián Ríos for Tierra de reyes; Gabriel Porras for Los miserables; Juan Soler for Reina de corazones; Omar Germenos for Tierra de reyes	Mauricio Ochmann for El Señor de los Cielos; José Luis Reséndez for Señora Acero; Juan Pablo Llano for Dueños del paraíso; Miguel Varoni for Dueños del paraíso
Best Supporting Actress	Best Supporting Actress of Súper Series
Daniela Navarro for Tierra de reyes; Adriana Lavat for Tierra de reyes; María Luisa Flores for Reina de corazones; Alexandra de la Mora for Los miserables	Carmen Aub for El Señor de los Cielos; Ximena Duque for Dueños del paraíso; Litzy for Señora Acero; Géraldine Bazán for Dueños del paraíso
Best Supporting Actor	Best Supporting Actor of Súper Series
Fabián Ríos for Tierra de reyes; Sergio Mur for Reina de corazones; Diego Soldano for Los miserables; Javier Díaz Dueñas for Los miserables	Tommy Vázquez for El Señor de los Cielos; Arturo Barba for Señora Acero; Jorge Zárate for Señora Acero; Manuel Balbi for El Señor de los Cielos
First Actress	First Actor
Lisa Owen for El Señor de los Cielos; Adriana Barraza for Dueños del paraíso; Laura Flores for Reina de corazones; Rebecca Jones for Señora Acero	Joaquín Garrido for Tierra de reyes; Guillermo Quintanilla for Reina de corazones; Henry Zakka for Reina de corazones; Damián Alcázar for Señora Acero
The Perfect Couple	The Best Actor with Bad Luck
Scarlet Gruber & Christian de la Campa for Tierra de reyes; Ana Lorena Sánchez & Aarón Díaz for Tierra de reyes; Aracely Arámbula & Erik Hayser for Los miserables; Carmen Villalobos & Rafael Amaya for El Señor de los Cielos; Kate del Castillo & Tony Dalton for Dueños del paraíso; Kimberly Dos Ramos & Gonzalo García Vivanco for Tierra de reyes	Rafael Amaya as Aurelio Casillas; Kate del Castillo as Anastasia Cardona; Aracely Arámbula as Lucía "Lucha" Durán; Blanca Soto as Sara Aguilar Bermúdez

=== Music ===
Favorite Mexican Regional Artist	Favorite Pop Artist
Gerardo Ortíz; Banda Sinaloense MS de Sergio Lizárraga; Calibre 50; Julión Álvarez y Su Norteño Banda	Enrique Iglesias; Juanes; Natalia Jiménez; Prince Royce
Favorite Urban Artist	Favorite Tropical Artist
Daddy Yankee; J Balvin; Nicky Jam; Wisin	Romeo Santos; Juan Luis Guerra; Marc Anthony; Victor Manuelle
Party Starter Song	
"El perdón" – Nicky Jam & Enrique Iglesias; "Mi vicio más grande" - Banda El Recodo de Cruz Lizárraga; "Perdido en tus ojos" – Don Omar feat. Natti Natasha; "Pierdo la cabeza" – Zion & Lennox

=== Variety ===
I'm Sexy and I Know It	Favorite Program
Kimberly Dos Ramos for Tierra de reyes; Gonzalo García Vivanco for Tierra de reyes; Juan Pablo Llano for Dueños del paraíso; Gaby Espino	Un Nuevo Día; Al Rojo Vivo; Caso Cerrado; La voz kids
Favorite Entertainment Presenter	Favorite Special Presenter
Daniel Sarcos; Ana María Polo; Jorge Bernal; Rashel Díaz	Gaby Espino; Lucero; Pedro Fernández; Raúl González
Favorite Sports Moment	Fan Club of the Year
"Chelsea is crowned champion of English football"; "Antonio Margarito says he would fight against Canelo"; "Marvin "Papi Gallo" Jones lost phone"; "New England Patriots ganan Super Bowl 49"	DYArmy – Daddy Yankee; Beasters – Becky G; BeliFans – Belinda; Harmonizers – Fifth Harmony
Favorite Influencer	
Caeli – YouTube/Twitter; LeJuan James – Vine/Instagram; Sebastián Villalobos; Yuya - YouTube
