= Nuestra Belleza Yucatán 2011 =

Beauty contest in Yucatán

- Date: June 16, 2011
- Presenters: Laura Castro Gamboa, Gímel Soberanis Cantón
- Venue: Hacienda Chichí Suárez, Mérida, Yucatán
- Broadcaster: Televisa
- Entrants: 6
- Placements: 3
- Winner: Jéssica Duarte; Mérida

Nuestra Belleza Yucatán 2011, was a pageant held in the Hacienda Chichí Suárez in Mérida, Yucatán on June 16, 2011. At the conclusion of the final night of competition Jéssica Duarte of Mérida was crowned the winner. Duarte was crowned by outgoing Nuestra Belleza Yucatán titleholder María Fernanda López. Six contestants competed for the title.

== Results ==
=== Placements ===
Final results	Contestant
Nuestra Belleza Yucatán 2011	Jéssica Duarte
Suplente / 1st Runner-up	Alejandra Preciat
2nd Runner-up	Paloma González

== Judges ==
- Ofelia Correa - Regional Coordinator of Nuestra Belleza México
- Luis Moya - Dermatologist
- Abril Cervera Bates - Designer

== Background Music ==
- Aarón Díaz

== Contestants ==
Hometown	Contestant	Age
Mérida	Alejandra Preciat Martínez	21
Mérida	Evelyn Gutiérrez González	20
Mérida	Jéssica Margarita Duarte Hermida	21
Mérida	Jéssica Ortiz Palma	19
Mérida	Natalia Villanueva Denis	23
Mérida	Paloma González Hernández	21
