= List of Univision telenovelas =

Logo of Univision.

The following is the list of telenovelas produced by Univision.

== Telenovelas order home recordings ==
=== 1990s ===
#	Year	Telenovela	Writer	Producer	Ref.
01	1994	Morelia	Delia Fiallo	José Enrique Crousillat	
02	1997	María Celina	Frank Bonilla	Alfredo Schwarz	
03	1998	La mujer de mi vida	Mariela Romero	Alfredo Schwarz	
04	1999	Enamorada	Mariela Romero	Alfredo Schwarz	

=== 2000s ===
#	Year	Telenovela	Writer	Producer	Ref.
05	2000	La Revancha	Mariela Romero	Alfredo Schwarz	
06	2001	Secreto de amor	Alberto Gómez	Alfredo Schwarz	
07	2002	Gata Salvaje	Alberto Gómez	Alfredo Schwarz	
08	2002	Te amaré en silencio	Enrique Torres	Ricardo Freixa	
09	2003	Rebeca	Alberto Gómez	Alfredo Schwarz	
10	2003	Ángel Rebelde	Alberto Gómez	Alfredo Schwarz	
11	2004	Inocente de ti	Carlos Romero	Nathalie Lartilleux; Alfredo Schwarz	
12	2004	Soñar no Cuesta Nada	Verónica Suárez	Peter Tinoco; Ana Teresa Arismendi	
13	2005	El amor no tiene precio	María Antonieta "Calú" Gutiérrez	Alfredo Schwarz	
14	2005	Olvidarte Jamás	Verónica Suárez	Peter Tinoco; Ana Teresa Arismendi	
15	2006	Mi vida eres tú	Verónica Suárez	Peter Tinoco; Ana Teresa Arismendi	
16	2006	Las Dos Caras de Ana	Pablo Serra; Érika Johnson	Lucero Suárez	
17	2006	Acorralada	Alberto Gómez	Peter Tinoco; Ana Teresa Arismendi	
18	2007	Bajo las riendas del amor	Katia Ramírez Estrada; Enna Márquez	Ignacio Sada Madero; Alfredo Schwarz	
19	2007	Amor comprado	Verónica Suárez	Peter Tinoco; Ana Teresa Arismendi	
20	2008	Valeria	Alberto Gómez	Peter Tinoco; Ana Teresa Arismendi	
21	2008	Alma indomable	Alberto Gómez	Peter Tinoco; Ana Teresa Arismendi	
22	2009	Pecadora	Verónica Suárez	Peter Tinoco; Ana Teresa Arismendi	

=== 2010s ===
#	Year	Telenovela	Writer	Producer	Ref.
23	2010	Sacrificio de mujer	Carlos Pérez Santos	Peter Tinoco; Ana Teresa Arismendi	
24	2010	Eva Luna	Alex Hadad	Peter Tinoco; Carlos Sotomayor	
25	2011	Corazón apasionado	Alberto Gómez	Peter Tinoco	
26	2012	El Talismán	Verónica Suárez	Peter Tinoco; Carlos Sotomayor	
27	2012	¿Quién eres tú?	Jimena Romero; Lina Uribe	Hugo León Ferrer	
28	2012	Rosario	Alex Hadad	Peter Tinoco; Carlos Sotomayor	
29	2013	Los secretos de Lucía	Jörg Hiller	Manuel Fraíz-Grijalba; Carlos Lamus Alcalá	
30	2013	La Madame	Nubia Barreto	Hugo León Ferrer	
31	2013	Cosita linda	Nora Castillo	Peter Tinoco; Carlos Sotomayor	
32	2014	La viuda negra	Yesmer Uribe	Hugo León Ferrer	
33	2014	Voltea pa' que te enamores	Nora Castillo	Carlos Sotomayor; Carlos Lamus Alcalá	
34	2014	Demente criminal	Andrés López López	Carlos Sotomayor; Carlos Lamus Alcalá	
35	2014	Tiro de gracia	Jörg Hiller	Manuel Peñaloza	
36	2014	El Chivo	Humberto "Kiko" Olivieri	Hugo León Ferrer	
37	2014	Señorita Pólvora	Andrés Montoya; Ana María Londoño	Gabriela Valentán	
38	2015	La esquina del diablo	Covadonga Espeso; Jordi Arencón	Hugo León Ferrer	
39	2015	Ruta 35	Andrés López López	Cristina Palacio	
40	2015	El Dandy	Rodrigo Ordoñez; Larissa Andrade	Gabriela Valentán	
41	2016	Blue Demon	Carlos Algara; Alejandro Martínez	Ximena Cantuarias	
42	2017	La piloto	Jörg Hiller	Patricio Wills	
43	2017	Falsos falsificados			
44	2017	Las Buchonas	Andrés López López	Patricio Wills	
45	2018	Descontrol	Carlos Wasserman; Juan Carlos Aparicio Schlesinger; Diego Chalela Arango; Carlos Moreli; Luis Miguel Rivas Granada; Daniela Richer Figueroa	Perla Martínez Legorreta	
46	2018	La bella y las bestias	Juan Camilo Ferrand	Patricio Wills	
47	2018	Amar a muerte	Leonardo Padrón	Carlos Bardasano	
