= La mujer de mi vida =

La mujer de mi vida may refer to:

- La mujer de mi vida (Venezuelan TV series), a 1998 Venezuelan telenovela by Venevision
- La mujer de mi vida (American TV series), an upcoming American telenovela by Telemundo
