= Aarón Díaz =

Mexican actor, singer and model (1972)

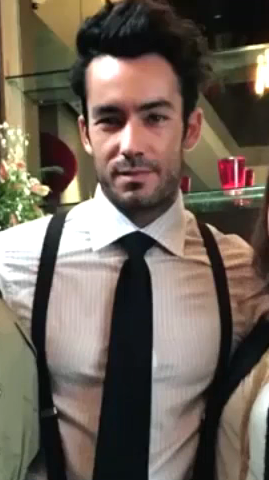
- Díaz in 2015
- Born: Aarón Díaz Spencer; March 7, 1982 (age 44); Puerto Vallarta, Jalisco, Mexico
- Citizenship: Mexico; United States
- Spouses: Kate del Castillo (m. 2009; div. 2011) Lola Ponce (m. 2015)
- Children: 2

Aarón Díaz Spencer (born March 7, 1982) is a Mexican actor, singer, and model. He is known for playing in series aired on ABC.

== Early life ==
Aarón Díaz Spencer was born in Puerto Vallarta, Jalisco, Mexico to an Irish-American mother (surname Spencer) and a Mexican father (surname Díaz).

== Career ==
He made his acting debut in the popular teen drama Clase 406, playing the role of Kike González. In 2004, he followed Clase 406 with another teen drama titled Corazones al límite co-starring with Sherlyn and Sara Maldonado. He later played the role of the older Andrés Romero in the telenovela Barrera de amor starring Yadhira Carrillo.

In 2008, he debuted as a designer and entrepreneur with the clothing brand Perra.

In November 2011, Díaz made his debut on American television with the ABC series Pan Am.

For the first time in his career, Díaz starred in an antagonist role in the telenovela El Talismán.

In 2014, he played the role of Arturo Gallardo, one of the main roles, in the Telemundo telenovela Tierra de Reyes, based on the Colombian telenovela Pasión de Gavilanes, working with Ana Lorena Sánchez, who starred as his love interest, as well as Gonzalo García Vivanco, Kimberly Dos Ramos, Scarlet Gruber and Christian de la Campa, having worked with the latter in Santa Diabla.

In 2016, Díaz was cast in the ABC thriller series Quantico in the recurring role of CIA recruit, León Velez.

== Personal life ==
In 2007, he began dating actress Kate del Castillo, and they were married on August 29, 2009 in Las Vegas, Nevada. A religious ceremony was later held in the Episcopal Church in San Miguel de Allende, Mexico on September 5 of the same year. He is now married to Lola Ponce.

== Filmography ==
=== Films ===
Year	Title	Role	Notes
2006	Amor xtremo	Sebastián	Film debut
2012	Marcelo	Marcelo	
2019	No Manches Frida 2	Mario	
2021	Habit	Priest	

=== Television ===
Year	Title	Role	Notes
2001	El juego de la vida		1 episode
2002–2003	Clase 406	Kike González	Lead role
2004	Corazones al límite	Braulio Vallardes Stone	Co-lead role
2005	Barrera de amor	Andrés Romero	Recurring role
2007	Plaza Sésamo	Doctor	"Visita al doctor" (Season 10, Episode 14)
2007–2008	Lola, érase una vez	Alexander Von Ferdinand	Lead role
2008	Terminales		2 episodes ("Sangre nueva" and "Espejismos")
2010	Dinoshark	Luis	Television film
2010–2011	Teresa	Mariano Sánchez Suárez	Lead role; 152 episodes
2011	Pan Am	Miguel	"Unscheduled Departure" (Season 1, Episode 8)
2012	El Talismán	Antonio Negrete	
2013	Rosario	Esteban Martínez	Co-lead role
2013–2014	Santa Diabla	Santiago Cano	Lead role
2014	Los miserables	César Mondragón Bianchi	16 episodes
2014–2015	Tierra de reyes	Arturo Gallardo	Lead role
2016–2017	Quantico	León Velez	Recurring role
2019	Betty en NY	Ricardo Calderón	Lead role
2022	Toda la sangre	Eugenio Casasola	Lead role

== Theater ==
- Vaselina - Danny.

== Discography ==
- Aarón Díaz (2011)
- Enamórate de mí (2009)

== Awards and nominations ==
Year	Association	Category	Nominated works	Result
2011	Premios People en Español	Best Male Lead in a Telenovela	Teresa	Nominated
2011	Premios People en Español	Best Couple (with Angelique Boyer)	Teresa	Nominated
2013	Premios People en Español	Best Male Lead in a Telenovela	Santa Diabla	Nominated
2013	Premios People en Español	Best Couple (with Gaby Espino)	Santa Diabla	Nominated
2014	Premios Tu Mundo	Favorite Lead Actor	Santa Diabla	Nominated
2014	Premios Tu Mundo	The Perfect Couple (with Gaby Espino)	Santa Diabla	Nominated
2014	Premios Tu Mundo	¡Qué Papacito!	Santa Diabla	Nominated
2015	Miami Life Awards	Best Male Lead in a Telenovela	Tierra de reyes	Nominated
2015	Premios Tu Mundo	Favorite Lead Actor	Tierra de reyes	Nominated
2015	Premios Tu Mundo	The Perfect Couple (with Ana Lorena Sánchez)	Tierra de reyes	Nominated
