= Pura pinta =

- Genre: Telenovela
- Created by: Daniel Ferrer Cubillán
- Starring: Óscar Cabrera; Abril Schreiber; Daniela Navarro; Sthuard Rodríguez; Emily Guánchez; Rigel Pesquera; Carolina Muizzi; Daniel Ferrer Cubillán; Zhandra De Abreu; Esperanza Magaz
- Theme music composer: Hany Kauam
- Opening theme: Si te da la gana performed by Hany Kauam
- No. of seasons: 1
- No. of episodes: 30

Production
- Production location: Caracas

Original release
- Network: RCTV
- Release: February 12 – August 17, 2007

Pura pinta (Only for Show) is a Venezuelan teen drama telenovela created by Daniel Ferrer Cubillán (who also acts) for Radio Caracas Televisión and distributed by RCTV International.

== Plot ==
The story begins when a group of young university students who come from different parts of the country, know each other in the most unusual and unexpected, because for a comical confusion, everyone will arrive in Caracas to a two-room apartment that will serve as a student residence.

== Cast ==
- Óscar Cabrera as Darío Marcano
- Abril Schreiber as Bella Scarton McGil
- Daniela Navarro as Bianca Rondón
- Sthuard Rodríguez as Rodrigo Arenas
- Emily Guánchez as Graciela Leal
- Rigel Pesquera as Omar Lozada
- Carolina Muizzi as Ana Verónica Ruiz
- Daniel Ferrer Cubillán as Mauricio Sangronis
- Zhandra De Abreu as Dubravska Golis
- Esperanza Magaz as Janitor
- Alejandro Mata as Carlos Herrera
- Vestalia Mejías as Anahís Barboza de Conde
- Juan Carlos Baena as Felipe Scarton
- Yajaira Orta as Marina Zubillaga
- Rosalinda Serfaty as Basilia Dávila
- Andreína Pérez as Yuricandela
- Pedro Pablo Alcántara as Franklin Batista
