= Jason Canela =

American actor of Cuban descent

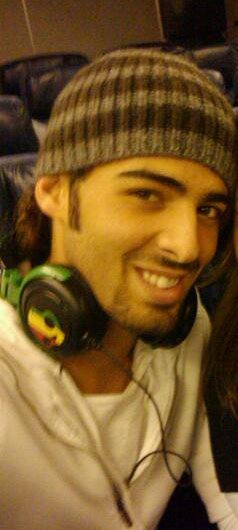
- Portrait of Jason Canela
- Born: April 25, 1992 (age 33); Miami, Florida, United States
- Occupation: Actor
- Years active: 2010–present

Jason Canela (born April 25, 1992) is an American actor of Cuban descent, best known for his roles in telenovelas. He has appeared in serials such as ¿Dónde Está Elisa? and Cosita Linda. Canela made his English-language television debut in 2016. He is the younger brother of actor-singer Jencarlos Canela.

In January 2018, Soap Opera Digest announced he had been cast in the role of Arturo Rosales on The Young and the Restless. Canela's time on the show in a contract role ended in 2020, but Canela made several brief appearances. In 2024, he appeared in several episodes of the Apple TV limited series Palm Royale.

== Early life and education ==
Canela was born in Miami, Florida, to Cuban parents Lisette and Heriberto Canela. He has three older siblings, including actor-singer Jencarlos Canela. Canela studied acting at The Lee Strasberg Theatre & Film Institute in New York City.

== Filmography ==
=== Television ===
Year	Title	Role	Notes
2010	¿Dónde Está Elisa?	Santiago Rincon	Supporting role
2011	SoBe Real	Pablo	Supporting role
2014	Cosita Linda	Cacho	Supporting role
2016	Pitch	Omar Robles	2 episodes
2018–20	The Young and the Restless	Arturo Rosales	Main role, 114 episodes
2021	The Rookie (TV series)	Cesar Madrigal	Guest role, 3 episodes
2024	Palm Royale	Eddie	Miniseries

=== Film ===
Year	Title	Role	Notes
2015	Camino	Sebastian	
2019	Always Be My Maybe	Waiter	

=== Theatre ===
Year	Title	Role	Notes
2022	On Your Feet!	Emilio Estefan	
