= Bertila Damas =

Cuban-born American actress

Bertila Damas is a Cuban-born American actress.

== Career ==
Damas began her career in Miami, where she worked in Spanish-language theater while in college. She was later accepted at the Circle in the Square Theater School in New York City. There, she met Terry Hayden, who got her interested in The Actors Studio, where she resided until Lee Strasberg's death. Afterward, she studied with Stella Adler.

Damas portrayed Clemencia in Electricidad at the Mark Taper Forum; and Marta in Eduardo Machado's Fabiola at Theatre for the New City in NYC. She is a Garland Awards recipient.

Damas's films include Nothing but Trouble, Mi Vida Loca, and Fires Within. Her TV credits include The John Larroquette Show, King of the Hill, NYPD Blue, Star Trek: Deep Space Nine, Star Trek: Voyager, and Grimm.

On international Spanish television, Damas is known for her role as the villainous Marta on Angelica, mi vida for Telemundo. She has been seen and heard in dozens of commercials and voiceovers in both Spanish and English.

Damas has served on the SAG board of directors (2010–2012) and on the SAG-AFTRA board (2012–2015). Since 2010, she has been the SAG–AFTRA national chair of the Ethnic Employment Opportunities Committee.

Damas had a recurring role as Camila Santiago on NBC sitcom Brooklyn Nine-Nine.

== Filmography ==
=== Film ===
Year	Title	Role	Notes
1991	Nothing but Trouble	Renalda Squiriniszu	
1991	Fires Within	Estella Sanchez	
1993	Mi Vida Loca	Rachel	
1998	True Friends	Maria	
2013	24 Seven	Lori	
2016	Dependent's Day	Mrs. Rivera	
2017	Lucky	Bibi	
2021	Bingo Hell	Yolanda	
2021	Here Kills the Bride	Brenda	

=== Television ===
Year	Title	Role	Notes
1988–1989	Angélica, mi vida	Marta Machado	140 episodes
1992	The Golden Palace	Beverly	2 episodes
1993	Reasonable Doubts	Donna Cooper	Episode: "Diminished Capacity"
1993	Dave's World	Rita	Episode: "Educating Rita"
1993	Breaking Pan with Sol	Sol	Television film
1994	The John Larroquette Show	Consuela	Episode: "Death and Dishonor"
1994	Star Trek: Deep Space Nine	Sakonna	2 episodes
1994	Thunder Alley	Delores / Parent #1	2 episodes
1994, 2000	NYPD Blue	Rosie / Dee Dee Santini	2 episodes
1995	Spring Fling!	Juanita	Television film
1995	Charlie Grace	Joann	Episode: "One Simple Little Favor"
1996	High Incident	Mrs. Ritchie Fernandez	3 episodes
1996	Women: Stories of Passion	Maggie	Episode: "La Limpia (The Cleansing)"
1996	Love and Marriage	Kristy	Episode: "Play Kristy for Me"
1997	Prison of Secrets	Carey's Teacher	Television film
1998–2008	King of the Hill	Maria Montalvo / Customer #2	Voice, 4 episodes
1998	Profiler	Mrs. O'Hara	Episode: "The Root of All Evil"
1998	Mr. Murder	Det. Beatrice Del Rio	Miniseries
1999	Star Trek: Voyager	Marika Willkarah	Episode: "Survival Instinct"
1999	ER	Dr. Debra Wexler	Episode: "Last Rites"
2000	The Huntress	Linda Van Slyke	Episode: "What Ralph Left Behind"
2001	Family Law	Dist. Att. Chloe Webb	Episode: "Sex, Lies, and Internet"
2003	The Division	Dr. Rebecca Santiago	2 episodes
2004	Crossing Jordan	Jordan	Episode: "Slam Dunk"
2005	Sleeper Cell	Brothel Manager	Episode: "Money"
2006	Bones	Judge Dolores Ramos	Episode: "The Girl in Suite 2103"
2006, 2007	The Nine	Anna Rios	2 episodes
2007	Dexter	Sota's Widow	Episode: "See-Through"
2010	CSI: Crime Scene Investigation	Mrs. Marta Santiago	Episode: "House of Hoarders"
2011	BYRDwatch	Reina Sanchez	5 episodes
2012–2013	Grimm	Pilar	4 episodes
2014	Murder in the First	Judge Sylvia Pace	Episode: "Pants on Fire"
2015	Red Band Society	Alma Quintana Leon	2 episodes
2015	NCIS: Los Angeles	Blanca Perez	Episode: "Driving Miss Diaz"
2016	If Loving You Is Wrong	Greselda	Episode: "The Will"
2017	Shameless	Judge Hara	Episode: "Occupy Fiona"
2017	La Quinceañera	Angelica	4 episodes
2017-2019	Brooklyn Nine-Nine	Camila Santiago	2 episodes
2018	Lethal Weapon	Martha Clarke	Episode: "Jesse's Girl"
2019	The Rookie	Maria Ochoa	Episode: "Plain Clothes Day"
2019	Pearson	Irma Castillo	2 episodes
2019	Lodge 49	Lenore	4 episodes
2019	NCIS	MCPO Renee Quichera	Episode: "Institutionalized"
2020	Roswell, New Mexico	Helena Ortecho	4 episodes
2021	The Burned Photo	Maxine	Episode: "The Orphan in the Trees"
2021	iMurder	Counselor Soto	4 episodes
