= El doctor del pueblo =

- Genre: Drama; Anthology
- Created by: José Pérez
- Theme music composer: Elik Álvarez; Juan Cammarano
- Country of origin: United States
- Original language: Spanish
- No. of seasons: 1
- No. of episodes: 20

Production
- Executive producers: Jose Vicente Sheuren; Georgina Terán; Maria Auxiliadora Barrios; Gabriela Valentan
- Producer: Nestor Duque
- Production company: Telemundo Global Studios

Original release
- Network: Telemundo
- Release: 19 November 2023 – present

El doctor del pueblo is an American anthology television series created by José Pérez, based on the life of Venezuelan physician José Gregorio Hernández. The series premiered on Telemundo on 19 November 2023.

== Premise ==
Each standalone episode is based on the life and miracles of Dr. José Gregorio Hernández, a physician who donated his time and resources to the treatment of low-income patients before being beatified by Pope Francis in 2021.

== Notable guest stars ==
- Gabriela Rivero
- Úrsula Pruneda
- Gabriel Porras
- Luz Ramos
- Erick Chapa
- Cecilia Toussaint

== Production ==
On 15 February 2022, the series was announced at Telemundo's virtual screening event with the working title El doctor de los milagros. In November 2022, Karen Barroeta, then executive of production and development at Telemundo Global Studios, announced that filming of the series had begun and that the official title would be El doctor del pueblo. On 6 November 2023, it was announced that the series would premiere on 19 November 2023, with a list of guest stars being published in a press release.

== Episodes ==
| No. | Title | Directed by | Written by | Original release date | Prod. code | U.S. viewers (millions) |
|---|---|---|---|---|---|---|
| 1 | "Un olvido irreparable" | Enrique Begné | Gennys Pérez | 19 November 2023 | 135 | 0.43 |
Gary is called in to work for an important business meeting and his wife, Oriana, asks him to drop off their two-year-old daughter Mía at daycare. However, Gary completely forgets about Mía and leaves her locked in his car and goes to work. Hours later, Oriana calls Gary to ask about Mía since she wasn't at daycare. Gary rushes to his car and finds his daughter on the verge of death from a heat stroke. At the hospital, Gary is arrested for child abuse and Oriana refuses to help him. The officer who arrested Gary introduces him to José Gregorio Hernández, whom he begged to save the life of a 13-year-old boy he had accidentally shot during a shootout. Gary is allowed to visit his daughter and he asks Oriana to pray for her recovery. Mía miraculously recovers and all charges against Gary are dropped, but he is ordered to attend therapy. Oriana forgives Gary and they reunite. Cast: Gonzalo Guzmán as Gary, Rocío de la Mañana as Oriana, Gabriela Rivero as Estela, Mahalat Sánchez as Guadalupe, Roberto Soto as the Inspector, Antonio López Torres as Ignacio, Mauricio Llera as Dr. Pinos, Gabriel Navarro as Anthony, Marco Núñez, Areliz Benel as the Psychologist
| 2 | "La abuela Eduarda" | Mauricio Cruz | Elizabeth Cruz V. | 26 November 2023 | 150 | 0.68 |
After the death of her grandfather, Carmela temporarily moves in with her grandmother Eduarda. Carmela meets Gustavo, a former basketball player who just moved to the neighborhood and volunteers to coach her. Lidia, a neighbor, asks Gustavo about his basketball career and his answers lead her to be suspicious. Gustavo feigns an injury while playing basketball and Carmela takes him home where he rapes her. Carmela arrives home crying and Eduarda thinks that she is mourning her grandfather's death. In the process of investigating Gustavo, Lidia and her husband discover that his real name is Rafael Aguirre, who has been wanted by the police for rape. After finding Carmela's jacket at the dump, Eduarda asks if anyone hurt her, and she confesses that Gustavo raped her. Eduarda grabs her husband's gun to shoot Gustavo but he takes it from her and aims it at her, Carmela intercedes and is shot. Gustavo is arrested and Carmela manages to recover. Eduarda and Carmela thank Lidia and her husband for their support. Cast: Clementina Guadarrama as Eduarda, Sasha González as Carmela, José Ramón Berganza as Gustavo, Gabriel Esparza as Lalo, Margarita Higuera as Lidia, Miguel Mena as Lidia's husband
| 3 | "Desaparecida" | Julia Rivero | Gustavo Bracco | 3 December 2023 | 102 | 0.63 |
Ingrid is a teenager who disappears after leaving school. The main suspect is her classmate Uriel, who has a crush on her and was the last person seen with her. Paty, Ingrid's friend, asks Uriel to meet her at the park but she never shows up and disappears as well. Officer Vega finds no evidence to accuse Uriel of kidnapping Ingrid and Paty and lets him go. Ingrid's father, Mario, is furious and decides to take justice into his own hands by beating Uriel, leaving him in critical condition. Ingrid shows up at the police station and confesses that she and Paty went into hiding to see how their parents would react and to see if they cared about them. After Ingrid and her mother's prayers to Dr. José Gregorio Hernández, Uriel recovers and Mario is released from jail. Cast: Úrsula Pruneda as Norma, Gabriel Porras as Mario, Frida Jiser as Ingrid, Hanssel Casillas as Uriel, Maryfer Santillán as Paty, Adriana Palmero as Officer Vega, Kaarlo Isaacs as Pulga, Constantini, Hatzin Navarrete
| 4 | "El peligro del silencio" | Mauricio Cruz | Violeta Fonseca | 10 December 2023 | 141 | 0.54 |
Cast: Lucía Toro, Roberto Aguilar, Leticia Pedrajo, Abril Mayett, Daniela Arce, Fredy Rizard, Alicia Lara, Lorena Rodríguez, Adriana Alonso Vargas, Evan Regueira
| 5 | "Competencia equivocada" | Javier Fox | Yamile Daza & Diego Osorio | 17 December 2023 | 121 | 0.53 |
Cast: Alexander Colmenares, Vladimir Rivera, Myriam Blanco, Alberto Acosta, Samantha Orozco, Rosendo Gázpel, Sajid Góngora, Mau Martínez, Cuitláhuac Santoyo
| 6 | "Perdón madre" | Enrique Begné | Erick Hernández | 7 January 2024 | 113 | 0.53 |
Cast: Mónica Jiménez, Nathan Bank, Camila Acosta, Fabian Pazzo, Ximena Glez, Rafael Álvarez, René Martínez, Miguel Soto, Emilio Gaitán
| 7 | "El extraño" | Jorge Ríos | Erick Hernández | 22 August 2026 | 117 | N/A |
Cast: Larissa Stephens as Delia, Cayetano Aramburo as Juan Pablo Herrera, Alondra Pavón as Delia's mother, Ramón Reche as Hernán, Efrain Félix as Mauro, Jimena de María as Ivonne, Christel Klitbo as Sonia Herrera, Gabriela Núñez as Dr. Cano, Luis Esteban Galicia
| 8 | "Caza al fresa" | Javier Fox | Gennys Pérez | 23 August 2026 | 119 | N/A |
Cast: Danna Ruíz as María José, Jay Samaniego as Fernando, Daniel Ábrego as Memo, Shira Barzilai as Romi, Nicole Reyes as Sandra, Maru Chirinos as Araceli, Pilar Padilla, Agustín Ocegueda, José Alberto Gallardo, María José Guerrero
| 9 | "Nosotros te cuidamos" | Mauricio Cruz | Daniel Alfonso Rojas | 29 August 2026 | 125 | N/A |
Cast: Teresa Rábago as Lisandra, Martín Saracho as Dante, Luiz Ricart as Isaías, Abril Mayett as Esther, Ángel David as Lisandro, Javier Centeno as Rubén, Yamile León as Dr. Rodríguez
| 10 | "Toxi-amor" | Jorge Ríos | Yamile Daza & Diego Osorio | 30 August 2026 | 128 | N/A |
Cast: Carolina del Toro as Bibiana, César Iván Díaz as Nicolás, Daniela Sanchez Reza, Emmanuel Varela, Sofía Frausto as Leonor, Marco Antonio Silva as Juvenal, Alberto Alejandro Zaldivar, Gilberto Esparza
| 11 | "La babysitter" | Javier Fox | Erick Hernández | 5 September 2026 | 123 | N/A |
Cast: Vanessa Bravo as Natasha, Sandra Celedón as Natasha's mother, Yulleni Vertti as Renata, Andrés Weiss as Emiliano, Patricio de Rodas as Salvador, Lucca Gaviria as Gael, Ana Paula D'León as Ximena, Georgina Rábago as Ximena's mother, Conny Cambambia as Marina, Luis Domingo González as Detective, Gilberto Dávalos as Dr. Jiménez
| 12 | "Un peligroso descuido" | Julia Rivero | Gustavo Bracco | 6 September 2026 | 126 | N/A |
Cast: Itari Marta as Diana, Patricia Rojas as Consuelo, Roberto Usanga as Jairo, Lorena Narcio as Catalina, Ari Shasho as Javier, Alex Briseño as Iker, Maite Piña as Laura, Natalia Esquivel, Manolo Garza, Antonio Pliego
| 13 | "La vida, un acto de fe" | Jorge Ríos | Yamile Daza & Diego Osorio | 12 September 2026 | 114 | N/A |
Cast: Fernanda Hernández as Natalia, Cinthya Hernández as Olga, Erwin Veytia as Guillermo, Josué Chena as Mateo, Lorena del Castillo as Lorena, Álvaro Sagone as Álvaro, Jerry Ramos, Esteban Ávila as Julio, Jimena Montes de Oca, Xicam
| 14 | "Sobredosis de luz" | Julia Rivero | Amaranta Olvera Camacho | 13 September 2026 | 130 | N/A |
Cast: Re Zetina as Romina, Alejandro Cuétara as Gerardo, Milleth Gómez as Margarita, Absel Ramsés as Jonás, Arianna Valh as Celeste, Benjamín del Toro, Maryfer Santillán, Claudia Trejo, Sabrina Tenopala, Pablo Vergara
| 15 | "Niñera electrónica" | Israel Pasco | Consuelo Garrido | 19 September 2026 | 127 | N/A |
Cast: Airam Camacho as Luci, Samantha Castillo as Jimena, Ana Karina Guevara as Marta, Liz Donnan as Pilar, Francisco Rocha as Toño, Miranda Rinaldi as Ivana
| 16 | "Pronóstico reservado" | Enrique Begné | Yamile Daza & Diego Osorio | 20 September 2026 | 111 | N/A |
Cast: Gizeht Galatea as Ileana, Kaarlo Isaacs as Martín, Danna Alcalá as Juliana, Amelia Latour Durán as Victoria, Sebastián Moncayo as Rodolfo, Emiliano Ortega Casillas as Emilio, Ari Gallegos as Professor, Leopoldo Bernal as Police officer, Diego Cossío Vega as Doctor, Héctor Berzunza as Jorge, Anibal Cammp, Rocío Vázquez
| 17 | "Hermanos de médula" | Mauricio Cruz | Daniel Alfonso Rojas | 27 September 2026 | 108 | TBD |
Cast: Marcelo Barceló as Gonzalo, Levi Vázquez as Antonio, Ana Silvia Garza as Antonio's grandmother, Laura de Ita as Gonzalo's mother, Alejandro Cuétara as Gonzalo's father, Saúl Hernández as Aníbal, Natt Quiroz as Ángela, Sheila Flores, Luis Loría as Dr. Fermín, Isaí Nolasco Muñiz
| 18 | "Mamá es siempre mamá" | Jorge Ríos | Gennys Pérez | 3 October 2026 | 106 | TBD |
Cast: Cecilia Toussaint as Valeria, Miguel Pizarro as Santiago, Frida Jiser as Mariana, Fernanda Echevarría del Rivero as Camila, Héctor Marino as Matías, Brenda Moreno as Adriana, Napoleón Glockner as Doctor, Berenice Camacho, Majo Carrillo
| 19 | "El diagnóstico invisible" | Jorge Ríos | Erick Hernández & Violeta Fonseca | 10 October 2026 | 129 | TBD |
Cast: Sofía Galad as Cami, Mauricio Galaz as Rolando, Abril Schreiber as Lara, Patricia Rojas as Berta, Maruza Cinta, Fernanda Echevarría del Rivero as Cami's teacher, Perla Encinas as Cami's mother, Alex Perazza as Doctor, Coral de la Vega, Patricia Madrid
| 20 | "El primer amor" | Mauricio Cruz | María Antonieta "Calú" Gutiérrez | 11 October 2026 | 137 | TBD |
Cast: Jacqueline Ivette as Majo, Nina Valdés as Isa, Sandra Benhumea as Pilar, Gabriel Ochoa as Joel, Jorge Briseño as Darío, Fernanda Hernández as Paola, Rafa Pineda as Dr. Fonseca, Ari Shasho as Tony, Luz Vallmen, Cynthia Luna

== Reception ==
=== Ratings ===
Viewership and ratings per season of El doctor del pueblo
| Season | Timeslot (ET) | Episodes | First aired | | Last aired | | Avg. viewers (millions) |
| Season | Timeslot (ET) | Episodes | Date | Viewers (millions) | Date | Viewers (millions) | Avg. viewers (millions) |
|---|---|---|---|---|---|---|---|
| 1 | Sunday 10:00 pm | 6 | 19 November 2023 | 0.43 | 7 January 2024 | 0.53 | 0.56 |

=== Awards and nominations ===
| Year | Award | Category | Nominated | Result | Ref |
|---|---|---|---|---|---|
| 2024 | Produ Awards | Best Anthology Series | El doctor del pueblo | Nominated | |
