= Toda la sangre =

Mexican TV series

- Genre: Crime-thriller; Drama
- Created by: Zasha Robles
- Based on: Toda la sangre by Bernardo Esquinca
- Written by: Rodrigo Ordónez; Santiago Rocagliolo; Natalia Mejia; Alejandro Gerber Bicecci
- Directed by: Luis Prieto; Hari Sama
- Starring: Aarón Díaz; Ana Brenda Contreras; Yoshira Escárrega; Clementina Guadarrama; Julio Casado; Odiseo Bichir; Antonio Trejo Sánchez
- Composers: Gerald Trottman; Michael Hodges
- Country of origin: Mexico
- Original language: Spanish
- No. of seasons: 1
- No. of episodes: 10

Production
- Executive producers: Coty Cagliolo; Manuel Marti; Zasha Robles
- Producers: Johanna Helman; Christian Vesper; Sophie Taylor-Gooby; Paola Ortiz; Rodrigo Ordoñez
- Editors: Lenz Claure; Karen Antunes
- Production companies: Spiral International; Fremantle México

Original release
- Network: Pantaya; Starzplay
- Release: 15 September – 10 November 2022

Toda la sangre is a Mexican crime-thriller streaming television series based on the book of the same name by Bernardo Esquinca. The series stars Aarón Díaz and Ana Brenda Contreras. The series premiered on 15 September 2022 on Pantaya in the United States and Starzplay in Latin America.

== Cast ==
=== Main ===
- Aarón Díaz as Eugenio Casasola
- Ana Brenda Contreras as Edith Mondragón
- Yoshira Escárrega as Elisa
- Clementina Guadarrama
- Julio Casado
- Odiseo Bichir
- Antonio Trejo Sánchez

=== Recurring ===
- Cinthia Vázquez

== Episodes ==
No.	Title	Original release date
1	"La espiga de fuego"	15 September 2022
2	"El ave y el espejo"	15 September 2022
3	"El incendio del templo"	22 September 2022
4	"El agua hierve en furia"	29 September 2022
5	"El ejército Azteca"	6 October 2022
6	"La opresora"	13 October 2022
7	"Tzompantli"	20 October 2022
8	"Un rayo sin trueno"	27 October 2022
9	"El códice"	3 November 2022
10	"El llanto de la madre"	10 November 2022

== Production ==
On 3 August 2020, Toda la sangre was announced as one of Starz's first international original series for its Starzplay streaming service. The series is co-produced with Pantaya, Spiral International and Fremantle. On 3 August 2021, Aarón Díaz and Ana Brenda Contreras were cast in main roles of the series. Filming of the series began on 12 August 2021, and lasted for twelve weeks. On 1 August 2022, it was announced that the series would premiere on 15 September 2022.

== Reception ==
=== Awards and nominations ===
Year	Award	Category	Nominated	Result	Ref
2023	Produ Awards	Best Crime Series	Toda la sangre	Nominated	
2023	Produ Awards	Best Lead Actress - Action, Crime, Horror, Thriller Series or Miniseries	Ana Brenda Contreras	Nominated	
2023	Produ Awards	Best Lead Actor - Action, Crime, Horror, Thriller Series or Miniseries	Aarón Díaz	Nominated	
2023	Produ Awards	Best Supporting Actor - Series or Miniseries	Julio Casado	Nominated	
2023	Produ Awards	Best Directing - Action, Crime, Horror, Thriller Series and Miniseries	Hari Sama	Nominated	
2023	Produ Awards	Best Directing - Action, Crime, Horror, Thriller Series and Miniseries	Luis Prieto	Nominated	
2023	Produ Awards	Best Fiction Producer - Series or Miniseries	Manuel Martí, Zasha Robles and Paco Cossio	Nominated	
2023	Produ Awards	Best Cinematography	Alfredo Altamirano	Nominated	
2023	Produ Awards	Best Creative Directing	Alejandro García	Nominated	
