= El magnate =

- Genre: Telenovela; Drama
- Written by: Manoel Carlos
- Directed by: Rodolfo Hoppe
- Starring: Ruddy Rodriguez; Andrés García; Salvador Pineda; Laura Fabián; Griselda Noguera
- Opening theme: "Tengo todo excepto a ti" by Luis Miguel
- Country of origin: United States
- Original language: Spanish
- No. of episodes: 136

Production
- Executive producer: José Enrique Crousillat
- Running time: 42-45 minutes

Original release
- Network: Telemundo
- Release: 1990

Related
- Angélica, mi vida; Cadena braga

El magnate lit. transl. The Magnate, is an American telenovela created and produced by Telemundo and Ángel del Cerro in 1990. The series was an adaptation of Novo Amor, a telenovela Carlos wrote for the now-defunct Rede Manchete network in 1986.

== Plot ==
The story centers around a love triangle formed by Rodrigo Valverde and Gonzalo Santillán, who fight to win Teresa's love.

Rodrigo is a power-hungry man who marries Aretusa, an elderly invalid and millionaire, out of interest, while Gonzálo is a divorced architect, who loves beautiful women and racing cars.

Both will have a change in their lives when Teresa, a film actress known under the name María Fernández, appears. She falls in love with Rodrigo, and encouraged by his representative, she tries to convince him to invest money in her new film.

However, in addition to being married to Aretusa, Rodrigo is the lover of Celeste, a rebellious and capricious girl. On the other hand, Gonzálo falls in love with Teresa, but this will lead him to do a lot of stupid things.

Power, ambition and hatred will play important roles within this love triangle, which must be surpassed to achieve true happiness.

== Cast ==
- Ruddy Rodríguez as Teresa / María Fernández
- Andrés García as Gonzalo Santillán
- Salvador Pineda as Rodrigo Valverde
- Laura Fabián as Celeste
- Griselda Nogueras as Aretusa
- Pilar Brescia Álvarez as Meche
- Osvaldo Calvo as Pedro
- Teresa María Rojas as Elena
- Zully Montero as Antonia
- Luis Montero as Agenor
- Manolo Villaverde as Pedro
- Carmen More as Francisca
- Vivian Ruiz as Carmen
- German Barrios as Ernesto
- Ricardo Pald as Julio
- Velia Martínez as Antonieta
- Marylin Romero as Inés
- Rosa Felipe as Magdalena
- Carlos Cano as Mayor
- Christina Page as Belisa
- Jorge Raúl Guerrero as Doctor
