= Tierra de reyes =

American telenovela

- Genre: Telenovela
- Created by: Rossana Negrín
- Based on: Pasión de Gavilanes by Julio Jiménez
- Written by: Basilio Álvarez; Illay Eskinazi; Yutzil Martínez
- Directed by: Luis Manzo; Ricardo Schwarz
- Creative director: Pedro De Larrechea
- Starring: Aarón Díaz; Ana Lorena Sánchez; Kimberly Dos Ramos; Gonzalo Garcia Vivanco; Scarlet Gruber; Christian de la Campa; Sonya Smith; Fabián Ríos; Daniela Navarro
- Theme music composer: Alexis Estiz; Alberto Slezynger; Vinicio Ludovic
- Opening theme: "Mi reina" by Ender Thomas
- Country of origin: United States
- Original language: Spanish
- No. of episodes: 160

Production
- Executive producers: Joshua Mintz; Carmen Cecilia Urbaneja; Jose Gerardo Guillén
- Producer: Aimee Godinez
- Cinematography: Joseph Martínez; Argemiro Saavedra
- Editor: Ellery Albarran
- Camera setup: Multi-camera
- Running time: 50 minutes
- Production company: Telemundo Studios

Original release
- Network: Telemundo
- Release: December 2, 2014 – July 27, 2015

Related
- Pasion de Gavilanes (2003); Fuego en la sangre (2008); Pasión de Amor (2015)

Tierra de reyes (English: Land of Honor) is an American telenovela premiered on Telemundo on December 2, 2014, and concluded on July 27, 2015. The telenovela is created by the Venezuelan author Rossana Negrín, based on the Colombian-American drama written by Julio Jiménez, entitled Pasión de Gavilanes. Produced by Telemundo Studios, and distributed by Telemundo Internacional.

It stars Aarón Díaz, Gonzalo García Vivanco and Christian de la Campa as the Rey Gallardo Leon brothers, and Ana Lorena Sánchez, Kimberly Dos Ramos and Scarlet Gruber as the Del Juncos sisters, along with Sonya Smith and Fabián Ríos as the main antagonists.

== Plot ==
Set in Houston, Texas, the story of the well-raised, humble and hardworking Gallardo brother's quest for vengeance against the wealthy and powerful Del Junco family. When the body of young, beautiful, and pregnant Alma Gallardo is found in the Houston River, her brother's Arturo, Samuel, and Flavio believe the family of her lover Ignacio Del Junco is to blame. Taking the last name "Rey" to disguise their identity, the brothers begin to work as construction workers at the sprawling Del Junco horse ranch to get closer to their enemy. With Ignacio already dead and learning how their beloved sister was mistreated by Ignacio's family, the brothers set out for revenge against Ignacio's widow, Cayetana, and her daughters Sofía, Irina, and Andrea. Their desire for vengeance and justice becomes more complicated when the Gallardo brothers and the Del Junco sisters begin to develop genuine feelings for each other. Complicating matters further, Sofía's husband is a scheming, opportunistic criminal who will stop at nothing to have the Del Junco fortune. Sofia and Irina leave their home to stay with Arturo and Flavio however the truth about the identity of the brothers becomes known to the Del Junco family and Cayetana develops hatred towards the Gallardo brothers while the sisters break up with the brothers and distance themselves from them. Matters worsen when Cayetana learns that Arturo is the one responsible for Sofia's pregnancy and becomes determined to see the brothers' downfall.

== Cast ==
=== Main ===
- Aarón Díaz as Arturo Rey Gallardo Leon; Sofía's second husband, Arturito's father, Flavio, Samuel and Alma's older brother and Verónica's older paternal half-brother.
- Ana Lorena Sánchez as Sofía del Junco de Gallardo; Arturo's wife, Arturito's mother, Cayetana's eldest daughter, Andrea and Irina's elder sister.
- Kimberly Dos Ramos as Irina del Junco de Gallardo; Flavio's wife, Cayetana's youngest daughter, Sofía and Andrea's younger sister.
- Gonzalo García Vivanco as Flavio Rey Gallardo Leon; Irina's husband, Arturo, Samuel and Alma's brother and Verónica's half-brother.
- Scarlet Gruber as Andrea del Junco de Gallardo; Samuel's second wife, Cayetana's second daughter, Sofía and Irina's sister.
- Christian de la Campa as Samuel Rey Gallardo Leon; Andrea's husband, Beatriz's widower, Patricia's ex-lover, Arturo, Flavio and Alma's brother and Verónica's half-brother.
- Sonya Smith as Cayetana Belmonte del Junco; Main Antagonist, later good; Sofía, Andrea and Irina's mother, Leonardo's former wife.
- Fabián Ríos as Leonardo Montalvo. The main villain; Sofía and Cayetana's ex-husband and a scheming, despicable opportunist.
- Daniela Navarro as Patricia Rubio de Matamoros; a famous night club singer and Samuel's former lover who betrayed him and married Ulises.
- Omar Germenos as Emilio Valverde; Villain; family friend of the Del Juncos, Isadora's adopted father, and a dangerous arms trafficker and mob boss.
- Adriana Lavat as Soledad Flores de Gallardo; The Del Junco sisters' nanny/mother figure, Verónica's biological mother and José Antonio Gallardo's second wife.
- Eduardo Victoria as Néstor Fernández, the police chief who is friendly with the Gallardos and handles most of the investigations, who also falls in love with Cayetana.
- Joaquín Garrido as Don Felipe Belmonte; Cayetana's wheelchair user father and a retired army general, who detests Montalvo from the start.
- Cynthia Olavarría as Isadora Valverde; Villain. Lawyer. Emilio's daughter, obsessed with Arturo. She later discovers that her mother is still alive and that Valverde is not her real father.
- Isabella Castillo as Alma "Reina" Gallardo / Verónica Saldívar Gallardo de Martínez; Alma is the Reyes' brothers dead sister and later Verónica appeared and is revealed to be the Reyes' brothers half-sister from their father's side which explains Alma and Verónica's resemblance.
- Diana Quijano as Beatriz Alcázar de la Fuente; Samuel's late wife and a kind-hearted, wealthy society lady.
- Ricardo Kleinbaum as Ulises Matamoros, villain, Patricia's husband who works for Emilio. He is jealous of Patricia's relationship with Samuel and makes a few attempts to have Samuel murdered. Un
- Dad Dáger as Miranda Luján Saldívar; Antagonist, later good; Verónica's adoptive mother and Cayetana's best friend
- Alberich Bormann as Darío Luján; Irina's best friend/ex-fiancée and Miranda's nephew.
- Roberto Plantier as Horacio Luján; Andrea's ex-boyfriend, Miranda's nephew.
- Gabriel Rossi as Pablo Martínez; the Del Juncos' trusted foreman and Verónica's husband.
- Gloria Mayo as Juana Ramírez.
- José Ramón Blanch as Roger Molina. Villain.
- Fabián Pizzorno as Octavio Saldívar; Miranda's husband, Verónica's adoptive father
- Jessica Cerezo as Briggite Losada.
- Sol Rodríguez as Lucía Crespo Ramírez, Juana's daughter, Tomas's sister.
- Kary Musa as Candela Ríos, Patricia's friend and valet, who often disapproved of her fling with Samuel. She later becomes a club singer in her own right and develops a friendship with Don Felipe, whom she says reminds her of her own father.
- Julio Ocampo as Tomás Crespo.
- Orlando Miguel as Jack Malkovich, Valverde's henchman. Villain.
- Fernando Pacanins as John Nicholson, Valverde's henchman. Villain.
- Virginia Loreto as Nieves; the Del Juncos' trusted maid.
- Giovanna del Portillo as Rocío Méndez; the Del Juncos' trusted maid, who loves Pablo and deeply resents Veronica's presence in his life. She later falls in love with Mauricio and gets engaged to him.
- Carmen Olivares as Matilde García, villain.
- Rodrigo Aragón as Mauricio Cabrera, Fernandez's second-in-command who later falls for Rocio and gets her pregnant. Later they both get engaged.
- Bárbara Garófalo as Linda Valverde; Emilio's niece.

=== Special guest stars ===
- Ana Sofía Durán as Child Irina.
- Joanna Hernández as Child Sofía.
- Macarena Oz as Child Andrea.
- Ricardo Chávez as Ignacio del Junco; Cayetana's husband, Alma Gallardo's lover, Sofia, Andrea and Irina's father.
- Guillermo Quintanilla as José Antonio Gallardo; Teresa's widower; Soledad's husband; Arturo, Samuel, Flavio, Alma and Veronica's father.
- Cecilia Melman as Teresa León de Gallardo; José Antonio's first wife, Arturo, Samuel, Flavio and Alma's mother.
- Viviana Ramos as Grace Varela, chief correspondent for Saldívar publications and Miranda's second-in-command.
- Marissa del Portillo as Julia Ortiz, Isadora's mother who, after rejecting Emilio Valverde, is committed to a mental institution by him after he kills her husband (Isadora's biological father).
- Damian Pastrana as Gustavo Mendez, Leonardo's trusted sidekick.

== Production ==
Production of the telenovela was announced in September 2014. Filming began in Miami and Houston on October 22. It is based on the Colombian telenovela Pasión de Gavilanes written by Julio Jiménez, adapted by Rossana Negrín.

== Ratings ==
Viewership and ratings per season of Tierra de reyes
Season	Timeslot (ET)	Episodes	First aired		Last aired		Avg. viewers (millions)
Season	Timeslot (ET)	Episodes	Date	Viewers (millions)	Date	Viewers (millions)	Avg. viewers (millions)
1	Mon–Fri 9pm/8c	160	December 2, 2014	2.16	July 27, 2015	2.39	TBD

== Awards and nominations ==
Year	Association	Category	Nominated	Result
2015	Miami Life Awards	Best Young Actress in a Telenovela	Kimberly Dos Ramos	Won
2015	Miami Life Awards	Best Young Actor in a Telenovela	Gabriel Rossi	Nominated
2015	Miami Life Awards	Best Female Villain in a Telenovela	Sonya Smith	Won
2015	Miami Life Awards	Best Male Villain in a Telenovela	Fabián Ríos	Nominated
2015	Miami Life Awards	Best Supporting Actress in a Telenovela	Adriana Lavat	Nominated
2015	Miami Life Awards	Best Supporting Actor in a Telenovela	Omar Germenos	Nominated
2015	Miami Life Awards	Best First Actress in a Telenovela	Diana Quijano	Nominated
2015	Miami Life Awards	Best First Actor in a Telenovela	Ricardo Kleimbaun	Nominated
2015	Miami Life Awards	Best Male Lead in a Telenovela	Aarón Díaz	Nominated
2015	Miami Life Awards	Best Telenovela	Tierra de reyes	Nominated
2015	Premios Tu Mundo	Novela of the Year	Tierra de reyes	Won
2015	Premios Tu Mundo	Favorite Lead Actor - Novela	Gonzalo García Vivanco	Nominated
2015	Premios Tu Mundo	Favorite Lead Actor - Novela	Christian de la Campa	Won
2015	Premios Tu Mundo	Favorite Lead Actor - Novela	Aarón Díaz	Nominated
2015	Premios Tu Mundo	Favorite Lead Actress - Novela	Scarlet Gruber	Won
2015	Premios Tu Mundo	Favorite Lead Actress - Novela	Kimberly Dos Ramos	Nominated
2015	Premios Tu Mundo	Favorite Lead Actress - Novela	Ana Lorena Sánchez	Nominated
2015	Premios Tu Mundo	The Best Bad Boy - Novela	Omar Germenos	Nominated
2015	Premios Tu Mundo	The Best Bad Boy - Novela	Fabián Ríos	Won
2015	Premios Tu Mundo	The Best Bad Girl - Novela	Sonya Smith	Nominated
2015	Premios Tu Mundo	The Best Bad Girl - Novela	Cynthia Olavarría	Won
2015	Premios Tu Mundo	Best Supporting Actress - Novela	Adriana Lavat	Nominated
2015	Premios Tu Mundo	Best Supporting Actress - Novela	Daniela Navarro	Won
2015	Premios Tu Mundo	Best Supporting Actor - Novela	Fabián Ríos	Won
2015	Premios Tu Mundo	The Perfect Couple - Novela	Ana Lorena Sánchez and Aarón Díaz	Nominated
2015	Premios Tu Mundo	The Perfect Couple - Novela	Kimberly Dos Ramos and Gonzalo García Vivanco	Nominated
2015	Premios Tu Mundo	The Perfect Couple - Novela	Scarlet Gruber and Christian de la Campa	Won
2015	Premios Tu Mundo	I'm Sexy and I Know it	Gonzalo García Vivanco	Nominated
2015	Premios Tu Mundo	I'm Sexy and I Know it	Kimberly Dos Ramos	Won

== See also ==
- List of telenovelas of Telemundo
- List of American telenovelas
- List of telenovelas filmed in the United States
