= Abril Schreiber =

Venezuelan actress (born 1987)

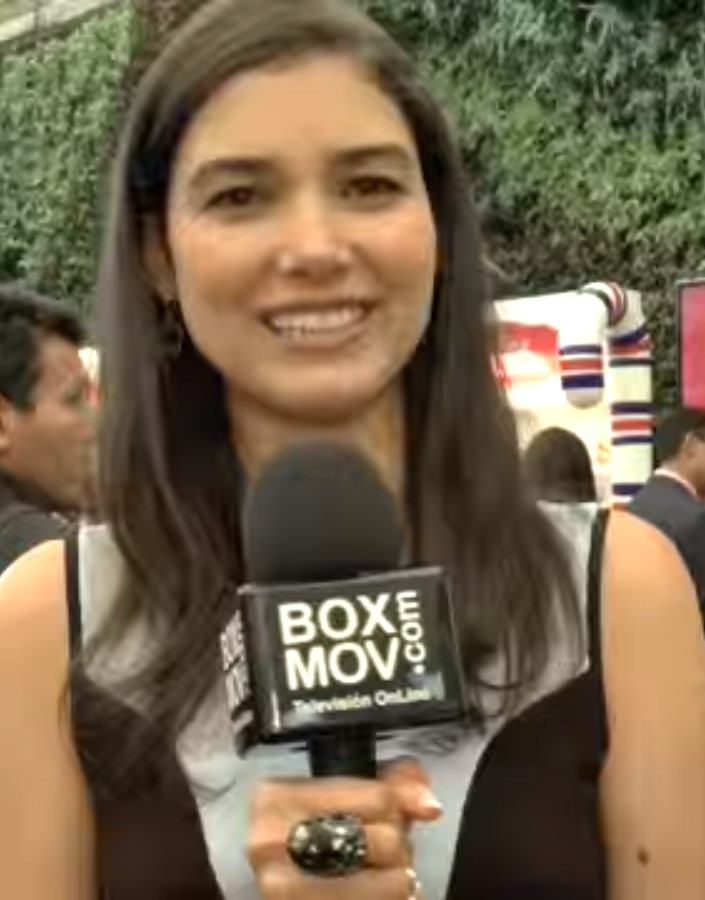
- Shown in 2015.
- Born: February 12, 1987 (age 39); Caracas, Venezuela
- Occupation: Actress
- Years active: 1998–present

Abril Schreiber (born February 12, 1987) is a Venezuelan actress. Born in Caracas, Venezuela. She made herself known on Venezuelan television in telenovelas such as Amor a palos, Toda una dama, and Tomasa Tequiero.

== Personal life ==
She lives in Bogotá, Colombia, where she has been known for several productions.

== Filmography ==
=== Film ===
Year	Title	Role	Notes
2002	Asesinato en lunes de carnaval	María Antonia	
2015	Habana Instant	Yamila	Also executive producer
2015	Usted no sabe quien soy yo?		
2016	Luisa	Marían	

=== Television ===
Year	Title	Role	Notes
2004	Negra consentida		Uncredited
2005	Mujer con pantalones		Uncredited
2005	Amor a palos	Greta Jhonson	
2007	Pura pinta	Bella Scarton McGil	
2007	Toda una dama	Alejandra Trujillo Laya	
2009	Tomasa Tequiero'	Miguelina Paredes Bustamante	
2014	Niche, Lo que diga el corazón	Marisol López	
2014	La ronca de oro	Young Virginia Tafur	
2014	Dulce amor	Juliana Toledo	
2016	Narcos	Marta Orejuela	Episode: "Los Pepes"
2017	El Chapo	Guadalupe	
2017	Sin senos sí hay paraíso	Claudia Romero	6 episodes
2018–present	Falsa Identidad	Gabriela	
