= Negra consentida (TV series) =

- Genre: Telenovela
- Created by: Valentina Párraga
- Written by: Henry Herrera
- Directed by: Olegario Barrera
- Starring: Ligia Petit; Pedro Rendón; Caridad Canelón; Eileen Abad; Jean Carlo Simancas
- Theme music composer: Miguel Cadenas
- Opening theme: "Blanca o Negra"
- Country of origin: Venezuela
- Original language: Spanish
- No. of episodes: 120

Production
- Executive producer: Arsenia Rodrigues
- Producer: Hernando Faría
- Production locations: Barlovento and Caracas, Venezuela
- Production company: RCTV

Original release
- Network: RCTV
- Release: September 15, 2004 – February 15, 2005

Related
- Estrambótica Anastasia; Ser bonita no basta

Negra consentida is a Venezuelan telenovela created by Valentina Párraga and produced by Radio Caracas Television in 2004. Ligia Petit and Pedro Rendón star as the protagonists.

== Plot ==
Barbarita is a young mestiza filled with beauty, a mixture of color and a passion for drums. However, she does not know her true origin as the daughter of a black woman from Barlovento, a small coastal town in Venezuela and a white Portuguese man. Barbarita is forced to flee from her hometown after being accused of a crime she didn't commit. To save herself, she poses as another woman and thus comes into the household of the Aristiguieta's, a family full of intrigue which is offended by Barbarita due to the color of her skin.

In the journey imposed by destiny, Barbarita meets with Miguel, a successful businessman who lives for work and whose maximum ambition is to govern the supermarket industry. He falls for Barnarita's charm and passion that resembles a hurricane. Problems arise when the husband of the woman Barbarita is impersonating discovers the lie. In addition, Barbarita will be the target of jealousy, envy and resentment caused by the unexpected inheritance that will receive from the Nascimento family, her true relatives. A great love story arises, between two worlds of different colors and flavors, which are intermixed in a rich aroma of coffee with milk.

== Cast ==
- Ligia Petit as Bárbara "Barbarita" Blanco Guaramato
- Pedro Rendón as Miguel Ángel Aristiguieta Marthan
- Caridad Canelón as Trinidad Guaramato de Blanco
- Eileen Abad as Isadora Russian
- Miriam Ochoa as Emma Marthan de Aristiguieta
- Jean Carlo Simancas as Caetano Nascimento
- Ámbar Díaz as Estela Aristiguieta Marthan
- Chantal Baudaux as Viviana Altúnez Meaño
- Alicia Plaza as Herminia Meaño de Nascimento
- Juan Carlos Tarazona as Rolando
- Wilmer Machado "Coquito" as Froilán Malpica
- María de Lourdes Devonish as Doña Bárbara Guaramato "La Abuela"
- Daniel Elbittar as Raimundo Aristiguieta Marthan
- Marcos Moreno as Juan de Dios Blanco
- Jenny Noguera as Antonia Blanco "Toña La Negra"
- María Cristina Lozada as Doña Bernarda Palacios de Aristiguieta
- Trina Medina as Felicidad Martínez
- Abelardo Behna as Wilfredo Meléndez
- Natalia Ramírez as Isabel Vélez
- Priscila Izquierdo as Valentina Aristiguieta Russian
- Numa Delgado as Aníbal Altúnez Meaño
- Brenda Hanst as Tibisay María Blanco Guaramato
- Pastor Oviedo as Clímaco Blanco Guaramato
- Glennys Colina as Celina
- Alexander Fernández as Gregory Blanco
- Luis Fernández as Rodolfo Aristiguieta
- César Román as Omar Abdul
- Daniela Navarro as Jessica
- Giancarlo Pasqualotto as Arturo Liscano
- Mónica Pasqualotto as Moraima Ferrer
- Flavio León as Jhon Jairo
- Carlos Olivier as Efrén Meléndez
- Abril Schreiber as Ella misma
- Joel Borges as Él mismo
- César Suárez as Sheik Shamir
