= Osvaldo Ríos =

Puerto Rican actor, model, singer, and guitarist

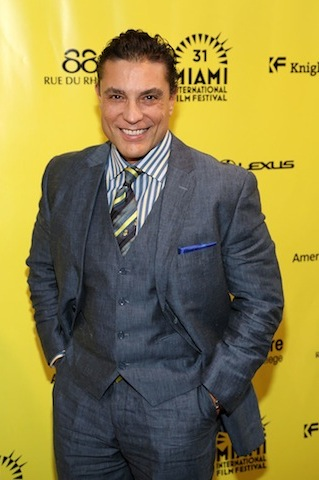
- Ríos at the 2014 Miami International Film Festival premiere of Elsa & Fred
- Born: October 25, 1960 (age 64); Carolina, Puerto Rico
- Occupation(s): Actor, singer
- Spouses: Sully Díaz (m. 1986; div. 1986) Carmen Dominicci (m. 1990; div. 1993)

Osvaldo Ríos Alonso (born October 25, 1960, in Carolina, Puerto Rico) is a Puerto Rican actor, model, singer, and guitarist, who is best known for his roles in telenovelas. He has appeared in several soap operas, including Abrazame muy Fuerte, Kassandra and the 1996 version of La Viuda de Blanco.

== Actor ==
Year	Title	Character	Note
2022	La casa de los famosos	Himself	Reality
2014	Elsa & Fred	Doctor	Film
2010–11	Triunfo del Amor	Osvaldo Sandoval	Adult protagonist
2009–10	Corazón salvaje	Juan de Dios San Roman	Special appearance
2008	El juramento	Santiago de Landeros	Protagonist
2007	Zorro: La Espada y la Rosa	Alejandro de la Vega	Co-protagonist
2006	Decisiones		TV series
2004	Ángel Rebelde	Alejandro Valderrama	Co-protagonist
2002	Gata Salvaje	Silvano Santana Castro	Supporting role
2000–01	Abrázame muy fuerte	Diego Hernandez	Special appearance
2000	Rauzán	Sebastian de Mendoza	Protagonist
1996–97	La Viuda de Blanco	Diego Blanco Albarracín	Protagonist
1993	Tres destinos	Juan Carlos	Protagonist
1992–93	Kassandra	Ignacio Contreras / Luis David Contreras	Protagonist / Antagonist

== Filmography ==
=== Films ===
Year	Title	Role	Notes
1990	En aquella playa	–	
2001	Los hijos de nadie	–	
2002	Plaza vacante	–	
2002	Más allá del límite	Andrés "El Indio" Solís	
2005	Miami Special Team	–	
2006	La carretera	–	
2013	Elsa & Fred	Doctor	
2014	Gloria	"El Tigre" Emilio Azcárraga	
