= Guadalupe (American TV series) =

Spanish-language American telenovela

- Genre: Telenovela
- Created by: Delia Fiallo
- Written by: Delia Fiallo; Tabare Pérez; Isamar Hernández
- Directed by: Grazio D'Angelo
- Starring: Adela Noriega; Eduardo Yáñez; Zully Montero
- Opening theme: "Guadalupe" by José y Durval
- Countries of origin: United States; Spain
- Original language: Spanish
- No. of episodes: 210

Production
- Producer: José Enrique Crousillat
- Production companies: Capitalvision International Corp.; Televisión Española

Original release
- Network: Telemundo
- Release: May 31, 1993 – June 17, 1994

Related
- Marielena; Señora tentación

Guadalupe is a Spanish-language telenovela produced by the United States–based television network, Telemundo, in conjunction with Capitalvision International Corp. and Televisión Española (TVE), from 1993, starring Adela Noriega, Eduardo Yáñez and Zully Montero. Soundtrack is Gerardina Trovato’s Non è un film.

== Summary ==
Ezequiel Zambrano is a powerful businessman from Miami who has a love affair with his maid and leaves her pregnant. In fear that her boss is going to force her to do an abortion, she runs away and when her child is born she names her Guadalupe. Guadalupe's mother dies when giving birth and the child is raised by another family, without knowing who her real father is. Guadalupe grows up into a beautiful young lady of good sentiments and high hopes: to find her real family and the man of her dreams.

The family of Alfredo, the Mendoza's, was killed when he was a little boy. Only his aunt Olivia and him survived the massacre. When they discover that the murders were ordered by the Zambrano family with the purpose of getting a hold of their family's fortune, they make an oath to destroy all the members of the Zambrano family. Twenty years later, Alfredo now a successful lawyer, under a false identity, manages to become the assistant of the cold and ambitious Luisa Zambrano, sister of Ezequiel Zambrano. Luisa is the person that actually ordered the murders of the family Mendoza and of her own brother, Ezequiel.

== Cast ==
- Adela Noriega as Guadalupe Zambrano Santos
- Eduardo Yáñez as Alfredo Robinson / Alfredo Mendoza
- Zully Montero as Luisa Zambrano de Maldonado, Marquesa de Covadonga
- Miryam Ochoa as Olivia Mendoza V. de Robinson
- Laura Termini as Marilyn
- Mara Croatto as Diana Maldonado Zambrano
- Gretell Celeiro as Daniela Maldonado Zambrano
- Larry Villanueva as Henry/Abel Maldonado Zambrano
- Braulio Castillo Jr. as Alejandro Infante
- Manolo Villaverde as Carlos Maldonado, Marques de Covadonga
- Jacobo Alzamora as Alfredo Robinson / Alfredo Mendoza de niño
- Salvador Pineda as Antonio Infante
- Miguel Gutiérrez as Ezequiel Zambrano
- Laura Fabián as Fabiana
- Nattacha Amador as Cira
- Yurianne Andrade as Lizzie
- Marcos Casanova as Isidoro
- Héctor Travieso as Sergio Cosculluela
- Frank Falcon as Chuchu
- Rosa Felipe as Delfina V.de Zambrano
- Maribel González as Cachita
- Alexa Kube as Perla Robinson Mendoza
- Paloma Longa as Violeta
- Isaura Mendoza as Katalina
- Carlos Ponce as Willy
- Jennifer Saldarriaga as Dorita
- Carlos Cuervo as Titon
- Mayte Vilán as Chena
- Marilyn Romero as Aurora
