= Julio Pereira =

Julio Pereira or Pereyra may refer to:

Pereira

- Julio Pereira Larraín (1907–1978), Chilean lawyer and Conservative politician
- Júlio Pereira (born 1953), Portuguese musician, worked with Kepa Junkera
- Julio Pereira (actor) (born 1969), Venezuelan actor, starred in Amor mío (Venezuelan TV series)
- Julio Cesar Pereira, Brazilian jiu-jitsu practitioner

Pereyra

- Julio Pereyra (1963–2016), Uruguayan basketball player
- Julio César Pereyra (born 1951), Argentine politician
- Julio Pereyra Sánchez, Uruguay, recipient of the 2023 United Nations Prize in the Field of Human Rights

== See also ==
- Pereira (surname)
- Pereyra (surname)
