= El peñón del amaranto =

- Genre: Telenovela; Drama
- Created by: Salvador Jarabo
- Directed by: Alfredo Saldaña
- Starring: Lisardo; Rossana San Juan; Raúl Román
- Opening theme: "Interminable Amor" by Yekina Pavón
- Countries of origin: United States; México
- Original language: Spanish
- No. of episodes: 95

Production
- Executive producer: Víctor Hugo O'Farrill
- Running time: 42-45 minutes
- Production company: TV Azteca

Original release
- Network: Telemundo; Canal Trece
- Release: October 18, 1993 – February 25, 1994

Related
- A flor de piel

El peñón del amaranto (English Title: The Amaranth Rock), is a Mexican telenovela produced by TV Azteca by former Televisa executive Victor Hugo O'Farrill and company O'Farrill & Associates in collaboration with Telemundo in 1993, broadcast at 21:30 hours being the first telenovela that company.

== Cast ==
- Marco Munoz - Damián
- Rossana San Juan - Victoria
- Raúl Román - Armando
- Graciela Döring - Josefa
- Carlos Cardán - Flaco
- Fernando Borges - Celso
- Edith Kleiman - Porfiria
- Nubia Martí - Micaela
- Marcela de Galina - Ángeles
- Claudio Obregón - Roque
- Carlos Andrade - Arturo
- Edmundo Arizpe - Ramsés
- Roberto Bonet - Joel
- Martha Aguirre - Sofía
- Javier Bayo - Remigio
- Martín Brek - Jarocho
- Jorge Brug - Rafael
- Verenice Callejo - Jovita
- Tomasa del Carmen - Dorita
- Lucía Castell - Mara
- Angelina Cruz - Tencha
- Adriana Fierro - Samantha
- José Luis Franco - Felipe
- Martha Itzel - Amaranta
- Roberto Mateos - Diego
- Alicia Brug - Superiora
- Lourdes Bustos - María
- Álvaro Carcaño - Nacho
