= Christian de la Campa =

Mexican actor and model

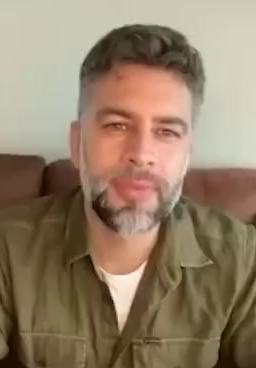
- De la Campa in 2023
- Born: Christian de la Campa; November 15, 1981 (age 45); Guadalajara, Jalisco, Mexico
- Occupations: Actor; Model
- Years active: 2011–present
- Height: 1.85 m (6 ft 1 in)

Christian de la Campa (born November 15, 1981) is a Mexican actor and model.

== Early life ==
De la Campa was born on November 15, 1981, in Guadalajara, Jalisco, Mexico. De la Campa got a call from Televisa and later decided to study acting at the Center for Arts Education "CEA" Televisa where he graduated in December 2010. That same year he participated in the theater play "La Vida No Vale Nada" created and directed by Luiz Mario Moncada.

== Career ==
He began his career modeling and participated in several model competitions. In 2010 he worked as a model for "Victoria's Secrets Fashion Show". In the same year he graduated as an actor at the Center for Arts Education "CEA". In 2011 he participated in Mr Model Mexico 2011.

He began his acting career in the Mexican television network Televisa, where he participated in two soap operas. In 2012 he joined Telemundo, and participate in soap operas such as Relaciones peligrosas, La Patrona and Santa Diabla. In 2014 he participated in the contest program of Telemundo, Top Chefs Estrellas.

At the end of 2014 was confirmed as the main protagonist of the telenovela Tierra de reyes, based on the colombian telenovela "Pasión de Gavilanes" getting the role of Samuel Gallardo, where he shared credits with Aarón Díaz (Who worked together in Santa Diabla) and Gonzalo García Vivanco (Who worked together in Relaciones Peligrosas and La Patrona) and also working with Scarlett Gruber as his love interest.

== Filmography ==
=== Film ===
Year	Title	Role	Notes
2017	Santiago Apóstol	Torcuato Cansato	

=== Television ===
Year	Title	Role	Notes
2011-2012	Una familia con suerte		Television debut
2011-2012	Amorcito corazón	Martin Corona	Recurring role
2012	Relaciones peligrosas	Joaquin "Joaco" Rivera	Recurring role
2013	La Patrona	Alberto Espino	Recurring role
2013-2014	Santa Diabla	Franco García Herrera / Sebastián Blanco / René Alonso	Recurring role
2014	Top Chefs Estrellas	Himself	Game show
2014-2015	Tierra de reyes	Samuel Gallardo	Lead role
2016-2017	Vino el amor	Juan Tellez	Main role
2017-2018	La hija pródiga	Salvador Mendoza	Lead role
2019	Un poquito tuyo	Álvaro	Recurring role
2020-2021	Vencer el desamor	Paulo Manrique	Supporting role
2021	Esta historia me suena	Claudio	Episode: "El Espejo"
2022	Corazón guerrero	Samuel Guerrero	Main role
2022-2023	Cabo	Maximiliano "Max" Rivas	Supporting role
2023	Vuelve a mí	Diego Carranza	Main role
2024	Vivir de amor	Ulises del Olmo	Guest role
2025	Me atrevo a amarte	Ángel Monteiro	

== Awards and nominations ==
Year	Awards	Category	Nominated works	Result	Ref.
2013	2nd Your World Awards	The Best Bad Boy	Santa Diabla	Nominated	
2015	Premios Tu Mundo	Favorite Lead Actor	Tierra de reyes	Won	
2015	Premios Tu Mundo	The Perfect Couple (with Scarlet Gruber)	Tierra de reyes	Won	
