= Tres destinos =

- Genre: Telenovela; Drama
- Created by: Ángel del Cerro
- Directed by: Ibrahim Guerra; Santiago Pumarola
- Opening theme: "Esta Clase de Amor" by Braulio
- Country of origin: United States
- Original language: Spanish

Original release
- Network: Telemundo
- Release: 1993

Tres destinos (transl. Three Destinations) is an American telenovela produced by Telemundo recorded in Puerto Rico, Mexico and Los Angeles by Telemundo for the U.S. Hispanic market in 1993. It was led by Alejandra Maldonado and Osvaldo Ríos with antagonistic action of Rodolfo de Anda. The telenovela also makes an appearance in the first season of the NBC sitcom Friends.

== Cast ==
- Alejandra Maldonado as Gabriela
- Osvaldo Ríos as Juan Carlos
- Rodolfo de Anda as Ramiro Garcés
- Edgardo Gazcón as Daniel Corona
- Lumi Cavazos as Cristina
- Caridad Ravelo as Marcela
- Irma Infante as Regina
- Lucy Boscana as Madre Asunción
- Mercedes Sicardo as Antonia
- Angela Meyer as Rita
- Angélica Soler as Brigitte
- Pedro Juan Figueroa as Lic. Rivera
- Samuel Molina as Tomás
- Rebeca Silva as Raquel
- Lino Ferrer as Aldemaro de la Rosa
