= Angélica, mi vida =

- Genre: Telenovela; Drama
- Written by: Ángel del Cerro
- Directed by: Grazio D'Angelo
- Starring: Laura Fabián; Carlos Montalvo; Alicia Montoya; Germán Barrios
- Opening theme: "Un tiempo para nosotros" by Braulio
- Country of origin: United States
- Original language: Spanish

Production
- Producers: Ángel del Cerro; José Enrique Crousillat
- Running time: 42-45 minutes

Original release
- Network: Telemundo
- Release: 1988 – 1989

Angélica, mi vida lit. transl. Angélica, My Life, is an American telenovela created and produced by Telemundo and Ángel del Cerro in 1988, in cooperation with Capitalvision International Corporation.

It was the first telenovela produced by Telemundo as a national network, bringing an end to roughly 30 years of production in Puerto Rico, where the network had its start. From now on, Telemundo's productions were made in the mainland United States, with an emphasis on Miami for filming and plot lines.

== Plot ==
The story revolves around three Latin families living in the United States, one Cuban, one Puerto Rican and the other Mexican. All three reflect the desire for success and improvement that prevails among Latino immigrants. The romantic interest runs between Angélica (Laura Fabián), a special education teacher, and Alfredo (Carlos Montalvo), who comes from a family that has a flourishing food business. But she will have to compete with two other women for the same man, who will use a network of intrigue to separate them, but what they do not suspect is that the romance may be in danger, because a dark secret can destroy the angelic love of this couple, condemning them to the possibility of a relationship with incestuous overtones because he could be their first cousin.

== Cast ==
- Laura Fabián as Angélica
- Carlos Montalvo as Alfredo
- Alicia Montoya as Inés
- Teresa Yenque as Amanda
- Kenya Hernández as Sonia
- James Víctor as Jaime
- Zaide Silvia Gutiérrez as Laura
- Jorge Villanueva as José Luis
- Ana M. Martínez Casado as Raquel
- Bertila Damas as Marta
- Jorge Luis Morejón as Raúl
- Marcos Beatancourt as César
- Germán Barrios as Pedro Juan
- Gloria Hayes as Julie
- Gerardo Lugo as Carlos
- Ivette Rodriguez as Lily
- Alejandro Joglar as Freddie
- Ava Alers as Delfina
- Tomás Goros as Ricardo
- Ricardo Pald as Paul
- Ilka Tanya Payán as Carmen Delia
- Jorge Luis Ramos as Alejandro
- Alba Raquel Barros as Sasha
- Rosa Blanca Menéndez as Edith
- Lucianne Silva as Susana
- Jaime Bello as Walter
- Lourdes Morán as María
- Osvaldo Ríos as Dan
- Carlos Llerandi as Padre Nolan
- Eusebia Beatancourt as Maggie
