= La mujer de mi vida (American TV series) =

American telenovela

- Genre: Telenovela
- Created by: Mario Schajris
- Developed by: Leticia Castro; Valentina Schajris
- Written by: Daniel Alfonso Rojas; Alberto Gonze
- Directed by: Sergio Busco; Eduardo Ripari; Ricardo Schwarz
- Starring: Iván Sánchez; Angélica Celaya; Mauricio Islas; Catherine Siachoque
- Theme music composer: Sofía Shizuko; Freddy Méndez; Irene López; Gabriel Nobrega; Jorge Romero
- Opening theme: "Collage" by Sofía Shizuko
- Composer: Joaquín Fernández
- Country of origin: United States
- Original language: Spanish
- No. of seasons: 1
- No. of episodes: 105

Production
- Executive producer: Miguel Varoni
- Producer: Elizabeth Suárez
- Production locations: Miami, Florida
- Editor: Ellery Albarran
- Production company: Telemundo Global Studios

Original release
- Network: Telemundo; Nueve
- Release: 8 October – 19 December 2024

La mujer de mi vida is an American telenovela created by Mario Schajris, with Miguel Varoni as executive producer. The first preview of the series was shown on Telemundo on 21 July 2022. It stars Angélica Celaya, Iván Sánchez, Catherine Siachoque and Mauricio Islas. The series premiered first in Mexico on Nueve on 8 October 2024.

== Plot ==
The series revolves around Ricardo Oribe (Iván Sánchez), a physically unattractive but successful businessman, dedicated to his family and in love with his beautiful wife Daniela (Angélica Celaya), a young aspiring actress. Ricardo's life takes a turn when his best friend Emilio (Mauricio Islas) betrays him and tries to kill him in order to take over his company and the family he never had. Despite being presumed dead by his family and friends, Ricardo is still alive, but suffering from amnesia. After a course of 15 years, Ricardo goes through several physical changes and recovers his memory.

Ready to recover everything that belongs to him, he assumes a new identity as Pablo Silva to avoid falling into the hands of the authorities for the bad move Emilio planned. Determined to win back the love of his life, he returns to reconnect with his wife, children and friends without being recognized. However, he must be careful because if he is found out, he could ruin his life and the lives of his loved ones.

== Cast ==
A confirmed cast list was released on 7 October 2021, on the NBCUniversal Media Village´s newsroom page.

=== Main ===
- Iván Sánchez as Ricardo Oribe / Pablo Silva
- Angélica Celaya as Daniela Millan
- Mauricio Islas as Emilio García Fuentes
- Catherine Siachoque as Marcela Jiménez Mello
- Patricia Reyes Spíndola as Antonia Oribe
- David Ostrosky
- Rodrigo Murray as Pedro Magnetti
- Norma Angélica as Nina López
- Vanessa Díaz as Juana Oribe Millan
- Jason Romo as Dante Oribe Millan
  - Cris Amado as child Dante
- Rosalinda Rodríguez as Sharon González
- Oswaldo Zárate as Juan Manuel Ávila
- Felipe Betancourt as Andrés Rósales

=== Recurring and guest stars ===
- Litzy as Carmen Alonso
- Norkys Batista as Evelyn del Río
- Pepe Gámez as Salvador "Chava" Ramírez
- Ana Lorena Sánchez as Ximena
- Josette Vidal as Nicole
- Simone Marval as Luciana Aguilera
- Vin Ramos as Ronnie Wilson
- Katia Bada as Caroline Domínguez

== Production ==
Production of the series began shooting on 17 September 2021. On 7 October 2021, the cast photo shoot and official press conference were held at the Telemundo Center studios. The production wrapped shooting on 15 January 2022 on location in Miami, Florida. The series was presented on 16 May 2022, as part of Telemundo's Up-front for the 2022-23 television season.
