= Corazón apasionado =

2012 Spanish American telenovela

- Genre: Telenovela
- Created by: Alberto Gómez
- Written by: Alberto Gómez; Coromoto Rivero
- Directed by: Carlos Pérez Santos; Tony Rodríguez; María Eugenia Perera; Tito Rojas
- Starring: Marlene Favela; Guy Ecker; Susana Dosamantes; José Guillermo Cortines
- Opening theme: "Corazón Apasionado" by Lucero
- Countries of origin: United States; Venezuela
- Original language: Spanish
- No. of episodes: 111

Production
- Executive producer: Peter Tinoco
- Producers: Dulce Terán; Arquímedes Rivero
- Running time: 45 mins
- Production company: Venevisión

Original release
- Network: Venevisión; Univision
- Release: February 13 – November 5, 2012

Related
- Eva Luna; El talismán

Corazón apasionado (English title: Passions of the Heart) is a telenovela created by Alberto Gómez and produced by Cisneros Media in 2011.

Marlene Favela and Guy Ecker star as the protagonists, while José Guillermo Cortines, Jessica Mas and Marcelo Buquet star as antagonists. Lorena Meritano, Luis José Santander, Dayana Garroz and Carlos Guillermo Haydon starred as co-protagonists.

== Broadcast history ==
From April 9 to June 14, 2012, Univision broadcast Corazón Apasionado weekday afternoons at 2pm central, replacing Ni contigo ni sin ti. From June 18 to July 27, 2012, Univision broadcast the telenovela weekday afternoons at 1pm central, replacing El Talismán.

Venevisión has aired the telenovela from February 13, 2012 to November 5, 2012.

== Plot ==
Patricia Campos (Marlene Favela), her two sisters, Virginia and Mariela, and her brother, David Campos, have grown up under the iron hand of their grandmother, Ursula (Susana Dosamantes), a wealthy landowner with a stern and domineering personality. Despite Ursula's disapproval, the teenage Patricia becomes romantically involved with Marcos (José Guillermo Cortines), a poor farm hand—but the relationship comes to a tragic end when he is mortally wounded. Years later, still marked by the loss of Marcos, Patricia has become a bitter woman whose heart is closed to love, and has drowned her sorrow by devoting all her time to managing the family ranch as strictly as her grandmother. Patricia's, her sister's and David's father is the evil man Bruno Montesinos (Marcelo Buquet). Virginia's father is Alejandro (Fernando Carrera).

The arrival of the handsome, charming, and self-assured foreman just hired at the ranch, Armando Marcano (Guy Ecker), drastically changes Patricia's life. Armando has a sister, Rebecca. While at first Patricia fights hard against the feelings he inspires in her, rejecting him, passion ends up taking over both of them and Patricia falls deeply in love. But once again, happiness will not be easy to achieve. Aside from facing her grandmother's opposition to her relationship with someone she considers beneath her, Patricia is up against a formidable rival: Her beautiful and wicked cousin Fedora (Jessica Mas), who wants Armando for herself. The situation becomes even more difficult when Marcos suddenly reappears, very much alive and now a rich, ruthless man who'll stop at nothing to get Patricia back.

Virginia is in love with professor Ricardo Rey (Luis José Santander) but he is married to drunkard Sonia and they have two children. Mariela is in love with Ramiro Meléndez (Carlos Augusto Maldonado). Sonia commits suicide. Bruno rapes Virginia. Patricia marries Alejandro but Marcos kills him; she is suspected of the murder. Marcos and Fedora team up against Patricia and Armando. Ursula has a friend whose niece is lawyer Leticia Bracamontes (Marjorie de Sousa). She decides to be Patricia's lawyer. David marries Rebecca and they have a daughter.

Ricardo Rey starts dating Graciela (Patty Álvarez), an ex-guardian at a prison from Mexico, doctor Alvaro's ex-fiancée. Fedora and Bruno kidnap Rebecca and her small daughter. Armando and David try to save them. Fedora hits Armando in the head; she advises him to go to the swamps area and cross the border. They leave David with his daughter and they take Rebecca and Armando as their hostages. Bruno is attacked. Fedora and Armando manage to escape. Marcos has illusions that he sees Satan and he almost kills his mother. He is committed at a mental hospital. The evil Teresa Rivas viuda de Gómez (Gabriela Rivero) ends up paralyzed and Virginia lets her stay in her house.

Marcos admits that it was he who killed Alejandro. Leticia reveals Ricardo that, in the past, she wanted to have Graciela sentenced to life imprisonment because while she was guardian at a prison from Mexico she received millions from a very strong person to kill an inmate; Graciela decided to burn down the prison not to leave traces and 300 women died. Graciela has an accident, ends up in hospital and forces Ricardo to marry her. Virginia is imprisoned and she finds out that she is pregnant with Bruno's baby.

Fedora cuts Patricia's face with a knife and, as a result, Patricia wants to break off with Armando. Fedora helps Bruno get out of the hospital. Leticia falls in love with Armando. Graciela wants to burn Virginia but both of them are trapped in a room by Teresa Rivas viuda de Gómez. Ricardo wants to save them but Teresa hits him in the head. Graciela dies impaled.

Both Fedora and Bruno are killed by Marcos. Armando and Patricia get married.

== Cast ==
- Marlene Favela as Patricia Campos-Miranda de Marcano
- Guy Ecker as Armando Marcano
- Susana Dosamantes as Doña Úrsula Campos-Miranda Villacastín
- Lorena Meritano as Virginia Gómez Campos-Miranda
- Luis Jose Santander as Ricardo Rey
- Jessica Mas as Fedora Campos-Miranda
- José Guillermo Cortines as Marcos Pérez / Martín Vegas
- Fernando Carrera as Alejandro Gómez
- Gabriela Rivero as Teresa Rivas viuda de Gómez
- Marcelo Buquet as Bruno Montesinos
- Carlos Guillermo Haydon as Diego Sánchez
- Daniela Navarro as Mariela "Marielita" Montesinos Campos-Miranda
- Natalia Ramirez as Sonia Alcázar de Rey
- Dayana Garroz as Emperatriz Ferrer Meléndez
- Carlos Augusto Maldonado as Ramiro Meléndez
- Raúl Izaguirre as Ignacio Meléndez
- Scarlet Gruber as Rebecca Marcano
- Héctor Soberón as Dr. Álvaro Martínez
- Beatriz Arroyo as Lorenza Sánchez Marcano
- José Miguel Gutiérrez as Father José
- Patricia de León as Carmen Rosa
- Lara Ricote as Mary Rey
- Kevin Aponte as Juan José Rey
- Christian Carabias as Johnny Gómez
- Carlos Perez as Perucho
- Beatriz Monroy as Ramona Pérez
- Eduardo Ibarrola as Melquiades López
- Patty Álvarez as Graciela
- Ahrid Hannaley as Regina
- Marjorie de Sousa as Leticia Bracamontes
