= Dueña y señora =

- Starring: Sara García
- Release date: 1948
- Country: Mexico
- Language: Spanish

Dueña y señora ("Owner and Lady") is a 1948 Mexican drama film written and directed by Tito Davison, and starring Sara García, Marga López, Domingo Soler, Alma Rosa Aguirre, Rosita Quintana and Lilia Prado.
