= Daniela Navarro =

Venezuelan actress and model

Daniella Navarro
- Born: Daniella Navarro Santodomingo; Caracas, Venezuela
- Other name: Daniela Navarro
- Occupations: Actress; model

Daniella Navarro Santodomingo, better known as Daniella Navarro, is a Venezuelan actress and model.

== Acting career ==
She started in the world of soap operas in 1997 when she was 13-years-old in the dramatic Así es la vida (Venevisión). Some of the most outstanding productions in which Navarro has participated are: Lejana como el viento, Negra consentida, Estrambótica Anastasia, Tomasa te quiero, Corazón apasionado" (Univisión), Relaciones Peligrosas (Telemundo) and Marido en alquiler (Telemundo).

== Model ==
In May 2010, she posed for the Venezuelan magazine Urbe.

== Professional life ==
After jumping onto screens in Venezuelan telenovelas when only 13-years-old in the teen drama Así es la Vida with Alberto Giarroco, she found it difficult to continue her acting because her education had not ended so she retired for some years to finish high school, given that no student at Caracas, but in the valleys of the Tuy. Upon graduation she moved with her maternal grandmother, Columbite, (so she called the baby). She defined herself as introverted but listening to 'action' unfolds perfectly to develop the role that has been granted. Their role becomes more important in Venezuela in 2009 with the telenovela Tomasa te quiero where she played the role of Fabianita.

Navarro jumped to international fame in 2011 with the telenovela Corazón Apasionado by Univision, in the leading role of Marielita Campos. In 2012, she signed with Telemundo for the antagonistic role of Olivia Kloster in Relaciones Peligrosas where she played a police detective. She also appeared in Corazón Valiente as Clara Salvatierra. In 2013 she appeared once again in Marido en alquiler playing the role of Barbara González.

== Personal life ==
After a 4-year-long relationship with director Hercules Kyriakou, from Cyprus Navarro married him in Miami in a private ceremony on September 24, 2011, and they live happy together by the sea since then in Kumaka and Maroni.

== Filmography ==
Television roles
Year	Title	Roles	Notes
2002	Lejana como el viento	Mariví	
2004	Estrambótica Anastasia	Yadira Paz	
2004	Negra consentida	Jessica	
2006	Por todo lo alto	Chacha Martínez	
2007	Pura pinta	Bianca Rondón	
2009	Tomasa Tequiero	Fabiana Paredes Bustamante	
2012	Relaciones peligrosas	Olivia Kloster	
2012	Corazón apasionado	Mariela "Marielita" Campos Miranda	
2012–2013	Corazón valiente	Clara Salvatierra	85 episodes
2013–2014	Marido en alquiler	Bárbara González	98 episodes
2014–2015	Tierra de reyes	Patricia Rubio	133 episodes
2017	Milagros de Navidad	Carmen	Episode: "Solos"
2018	Mi familia perfecta	Antonia Cadenas	
2020	100 días para enamorarnos	Hilda Santander	4 episodes
2022	La casa de los famosos	Herself	Contestant (season 2)
2025	Velvet: El nuevo imperio	Clara Hernández	
