= Cosita linda =

2014 Spanish telenovela

- Genre: Telenovela
- Created by: Nora Castillo
- Story by: Leonardo Padrón
- Directed by: María Eugenia Perera; Arquímedes Rivero; Otto Rodríguez; Carlos Santos
- Creative director: Raúl de la Nuez
- Starring: Christian Meier; Ana Lorena Sánchez; Pedro Moreno; Zuleyka Rivera; Carolina Tejera; Scarlet Gruber; Adrián Di Monte
- Opening theme: "Si te digo la verdad" performed by Gocho; "Cosita linda" performed by Manuel Ramos Quintana
- Countries of origin: Venezuela; United States
- Original language: Spanish
- No. of episodes: 146

Production
- Executive producers: Carlos Sotomayor; Peter Tinoco
- Producer: Cristina de la Parra
- Cinematography: Eduardo Dávila
- Editor: Orlando Manzo
- Camera setup: Multi-camera
- Production companies: Univision Studios; Venevisión International

Original release
- Network: Univisión; Venevisión
- Release: January 27 – September 22, 2014

Related
- Cosita rica

Cosita linda is a Spanish-language telenovela produced by Carlos Sotomayor and Peter Tinoco, and adapted by Nora Castillo for Venevisión and Univisión. It is distributed internationally by Venevisión International and Cisneros Media Distribution. It is a remake of the telenovela Cosita rica created in 2003 by Leonardo Padrón.

The series stars Christian Meier as Diego, Pedro Moreno as Olegario, Zuleyka Rivera as Viviana, Carolina Tejera as Tiffany, Ana Lorena Sánchez as Ana Lorena, Scarlet Gruber as Maria José and Mariana and Adrián Di Monte as Santiago.

== Plot ==
Luján families and Rincón live in different worlds; the Luján live a life of privilege, enjoying the benefits of their economic status; while the Rincón are a middle, simple working class. The fate join Diego Luján and Ana Rincón and their families in the process.

== Cast ==
=== Main ===
- Christian Meier as Diego Luján
- Ana Lorena Sánchez as Ana Lorena Rincón
- Pedro Moreno as Olegario Pérez
- Zuleyka Rivera as Viviana Robles
- Carolina Tejera as Tiffany Robles
- Scarlet Gruber as Maria José Luján / Mariana Vargas
- Adrián Di Monte as Santiago Rincón

=== Recurring ===
- Alma Delfina as Doña Santa
- Anna Silvetti as Consuelo Pérez
- Alfredo Huereca as Don Lupe Rincón
- Alberto Salaberry as Vicente Durán
- Cristina Bernal as Palmira Arroyo
- Mariet Rodríguez as Laura
- Ana Sobero as Prudencia Vargas
- Norma Zúñiga as Ramona
- Liliana Rodriguez as Camila "La Chata"
- Xavier Coronel as Raúl Yáñez
- Mijail Mulkay as Lisandro Gómez
- Franklin Virguez as Darío Núñez
- Sandra Itzel as Maya
- Emeraude Toubia as Dulce Rincón
- Patricio Gallardo as Nicolás
- Ana Belén Lander as Deborah "Debbie" Durán
- Gisella Aboumrad as Carmela
- Juan Carlos Flores as El Pelón
- Tali Duclaud as Romina
- Danilo Carrera as Federico "Fede" Madariaga
- Jason Canela as José Carlos Merina "El Cacho"

=== Guest stars ===
- Henry Zakka as Narciso Luján
- Eva Tamargo as Telma Luján
- Mauricio Mejía as Alejandro "Alex" Casteló
- Carlos Garín as Gastón de la Peña
