= Scarlet Gruber =

Venezuelan actress & dancer (born 1989)

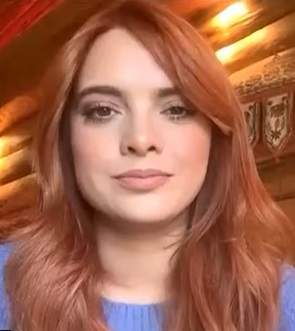
- Gruber interviewed by Dulce Osuna in 2019
- Born: Scarlet Alexandra Fernández Cristancho; February 10, 1989 (age 37); Caracas, Venezuela
- Occupations: Actress, dancer
- Years active: 2010-present

Scarlet Gruber (née Fernández, born on February 10, 1989) in Caracas, Venezuela, is a Venezuelan actress and dancer best known for her performances in telenovelas. She is the daughter of former actress Astrid Gruber and singer Gabriel Fernández.

== Filmography ==
=== Film ===
| Year | Title | Role | Notes |
|---|---|---|---|
| 2012 | With Elizabeth in Mount Dora | Elizabeth | |
| 2015 | Los Ocho | Tina | Short film |
| 2017 | Santiago Apóstol | Princess Viria | |

=== Television ===
| Year | Title | Role | Notes |
|---|---|---|---|
| 2010 | Aurora | Jenny | Guest role |
| 2012 | Corazón apasionado | Rebeca Marcano | Supporting role; 111 episodes |
| 2013 | Rosario | Cecilia Garza | Supporting role; 107 episodes |
| 2014 | Cosita linda | Maria José Luján and Mariana Vargas | Main role; 146 episodes |
| 2014–2015 | Tierra de reyes | Andrea del Junco Belmonte | Lead role; 160 episodes |
| 2016 | El Chema | Young Blanca | Episode: "Joven matón" |
| 2017 | El desconocido | Karla | |
| 2017 | Vikki RPM | Kira Rivera | Main role; 60 episodes |
| 2017–2018 | Sin tu mirada | Vanessa Villoslada | Main role; 112 episodes |
| 2019–2020 | Médicos, línea de vida | Tania Olivares | Main role; 87 episodes |
| 2020–2021 | Quererlo todo | Sandy Cabrera | Main role; 122 episodes |
| 2021–2022 | Si nos dejan | Julieta Lugo | Main role; 83 episodes |
| 2023 | Gloria Trevi: Ellas soy yo | Gloria Trevi | Lead role |
| 2024 | El precio de amarte | Amelia Ferreira Saldívar | Lead role |
| 2025 | Mujeres asesinas | Nayeli | Episode: "Nayeli" |
| 2025 | Doménica Montero | Kiara Salerno Rivas | Main role |
| 2027 | Todavía te amo | María Emilia Palacios | Lead role |

=== Music video ===
| Year | Song | Role |
|---|---|---|
| 2012 | "Yo no soy un monstruo" by Elvis Crespo and Los Ilegales | Popular Girl |

== Awards and nominations ==
| Year | Association | Category | Nominated works | Result |
|---|---|---|---|---|
| 2015 | Miami Life Awards | Best Young Actress in a Telenovela | Cosita linda | Nominated |
| 2015 | Premios Tu Mundo | Favorite Lead Actress | Tierra de reyes | Won |
| 2015 | Premios Tu Mundo | Best Couple (with Christian de la Campa) | Tierra de reyes | Won |
| 2018 | TVyNovelas Award | Best Young Lead Actress | Sin tu mirada | Nominated |
