= Señora tentación =

- Genre: Telenovela; Drama
- Created by: Ángel del Cerro; Gina Montaner
- Directed by: Enrique Gómez Vadillo
- Opening theme: "Señora tentación" by Lucía Méndez
- Country of origin: United States
- Original language: Spanish
- No. of episodes: 60

Production
- Producer: Cynthia Hudson Fernández

Original release
- Network: Telemundo

Señora tentación is an American telenovela produced by Telemundo. It starred Lucía Méndez, Danilo Santos and Miguel Ángel Rodríguez.

== Cast ==
- Lucía Méndez as Rosa Moreno
- Danilo Santos as Víctor Manuel
- Miguel Ángel Rodríguez as Ignacio Artigas
- Braulio Castillo Jr. as Alirio Moncada
- Zully Montero as Marlene
- Isela Vega as Tamara
- Manny Rodriguez as Ricardo Monteverde
- Lourdes Chacón as Alicia
- Miguel Ángel Suárez as Gerardo del Río
- Herrnán O'Neill as Rodrigo
- Pedro Juan Figueroa as Leonardo Bustillos
- Maricarmen Avilés as Jacqueline Bustillos
