= Cadena braga =

American telenovela

- Genre: Telenovela; Drama
- Directed by: Alfonso Rodríguez
- Country of origin: United States
- Original language: Spanish

Original release
- Network: Telemundo
- Release: 1991

Cadena braga is an American telenovela created and produced by Telemundo 1991.

== Cast ==
- Carmen Carrasco as Julia Hernández
- Carlos Vives as José Antonio Montellano
- Mara Croatto as Sabrinna Valberde
- Carlota Carretero as Eugenia de Montellano
- Adriana Cataño as Nisa
- Xavier Coronel as Rubén
- Richard Douglas as Kike
- Bernadita García Estmester as Lucida
- Karla Hatton as Adelaida
- Robert Marrero as Carlos
- Ricardo Montalbán as Marcel
- Víctor Pujols as Nataliel
- Héctor Álvarez as Alberto
