= Ana Lorena Sánchez =

Mexican-American actress

- Born: Ana Lorena Sánchez Mondragón; August 14, 1990 (age 36); Mexico City, Distrito Federal, Mexico
- Occupation: Actress
- Years active: 2012–present

Ana Lorena Sánchez Mondragón (born August 14, 1990, in Mexico City, Distrito Federal, Mexico), is a Mexican-American actress best known for her lead roles in the telenovelas Cosita linda and Tierra de reyes.

== Biography ==
Sánchez was born in Mexico City and raised in McAllen, Texas.

Sánchez began acting in her high school's one-act play as an extra. She started dancing at the age of 6. Sánchez decided to apply for college and major in Psychology and Communications, however, she knew acting was what she wanted to pursue, studying Meisner technique in Miami and getting three leading roles in the US market. She resides in Los Angeles

== Career ==
Sánchez made her acting debut on the Telemundo telenovela Relaciones peligrosas in the role of Elizabeth. Later on, she landed her first lead role as Ana Lorena in Cosita linda.

In 2014, Sánchez was cast in her breakthrough role as Sofía del Junco in the popular Telemundo telenovela Tierra de Reyes.

== Filmography ==
Television roles
Year	Title	Roles	Notes
2012	Relaciones peligrosas	Elizabeth Gómez	Supporting role
2014	Cosita linda	Ana Lorena Rincón	Lead role; 146 episodes
2014	Tu Dia Alegre	Herself	
2014–2015	Tierra de reyes	Sofía del Junco Belmonte	Lead role; 159 episodes
2015	Demente criminal	Carla Luciano	Recurring role; 8 episodes
2024	La mujer de mi vida	Ximena	Post-production

Film roles
Year	Title	Roles	Notes
2014	Aegis	Clara	Short film
2017	Santiago Apóstol	María Magdalena	
2017	Case Unknown	Ana Coleman	Short film
2021	Here I Am	Nicole	Drama

Web series
Year	Title	Roles	Notes
2021	Seven Sitters in July	Gala	Miniseries; episode 7
