= Kids' Choice Awards Argentina 2012 =

Nickelodeon's 2nd Annual Kids' Choice Awards Argentina
- Date: 5 October 2012
- Location: Microestadio Malvinas Argentinas, Buenos Aires
- Hosted by: Favio Posca

Television/radio coverage
- Network: Nickelodeon Latin America
- Runtime: 120 minutes
- Produced by: Production company: Nickelodeon Productions; Executive producer: Paula Guerro Tatiana Rodriguez

The Nickelodeon Kids Choice Awards Argentina 2012 took place on 5 October 2012 at 19:00 hrs (Argentine Time) in the Microestadio Malvinas Argentinas in the city of Buenos Aires. Favio Posca was presented as host. In this edition, 15 categories were launched, one category more than last year.

The musical performances during the awards were telecast: Big Time Rush, Eme 15 (from the hit teen drama Miss XV), Miranda!, Axel and Rock Bones (from the Disney XD series Peter Punk) of performances during the broadcast of the event, and each sang a medley of some of his/her latest hits. As in previous years, voting was conducted online through the official website of the program. In addition, through the network of Facebook page, one can also vote through Facebook accounts 'fans' first channel.

== Presenters ==
=== Host ===
- Favio Posca

=== Presenters ===
- Agustina Cordova
- Benjamin Rojas
- Beto Cuevas
- Danna Paola
- Franco Masini
- Gaston Soffritti
- Germán Paoloski
- Gigantes del Catch
- Isabella Castillo and Andrés Mercado
- Jenny Williams
- Jorge Blanco
- Lucía Precul
- Macarena Paz
- Martina Stoessel
- Mercedes Lambre
- Mex Urtizberea
- Pablo Espinosa
- Rodrigo Noya
- Roger Gonzalez
- The Wanted
- Victoria Justice
- Violeta Urtizberea

=== Music performances ===
- Miranda!
- Rock Bones
- Axel
- Eme 15
- Big Time Rush

== Categories ==
=== Favourite TV Show ===
Series/Teen-Drama	Result	Country
Grachi	Won	United States
Julie e os Fantasmas (Julie y los Fantasmas)	Nominated	Brazil
Miss XV	Nominated	Mexico
Violetta	Nominated	Argentina

=== Favourite Actress ===
Artist/Character	Series/Teen-Drama	Result	Country
Isabella Castillo/Grachi	Grachi	Won	Cuba
Paulina Goto/Valentina	Miss XV	Nominated	Mexico
Candela Vetrano/Poli	Supertorpe	Nominated	Argentina
Violeta Urtizberea/Gabriela	Graduados	Nominated	Argentina

=== Favourite Villain ===
Artista/Personaje	Series/Teen-Drama	Result	Country
Kimberly Dos Ramos/Matilda	Grachi	Nominated	Venezuela
María Gabriela de Faría/Mía	Grachi	Nominated	Venezuela
Eleazar Gómez/Alexis	Miss XV	Nominated	Mexico
Mercedes Lambre/Ludmila	Violetta	Won	Argentina

=== Favourite Cartoon ===
Cartoon	Result	Country
SpongeBob SquarePants (Bob Esponja)	Nominated	United States
Phineas and Ferb	Won	United States
Fish Hooks (Pecezuelos)	Nominated	United States
Adventure Time (Hora de Aventura)	Nominated	United States

=== Favourite Animated Movie ===
Movie	Result	Country
Madagascar 3: Europe's Most Wanted (Madagascar 3: Los Fugitivos)	Won	United States
Alvin and the Chipmunks 3 (Alvin y las Ardillas 3)	Nominated	United States
The Smurfs (Los Pitufos)	Nominated	United States
Puss in Boots (El Gato con Botas)	Nominated	United States

=== International Artist or Group ===
Artist/Band	Result	Country
One Direction	Nominated	United Kingdom
Katy Perry	Nominated	United States
Big Time Rush	Won	United States
Justin Bieber	Nominated	Canada

=== Favourite Song ===
Song	Artist/Band	Result	Country
Ai Se Eu Te Pego	Michel Teló	Nominated	Brazil
What Makes You Beautiful	One Direction	Won	United Kingdom
Rolling In The Deep	Adele	Nominated	United Kingdom
Ya Lo Sabía	Miranda!	Nominated	Argentina

=== Favourite Video Game ===
Video game	Result
Just Dance 3	Nominated
Where's My Water? (¿Dónde está mi agua?)	Nominated
Pes 2012	Nominated
Angry Birds	Won

=== International TV Show ===
Series	Result	Country
Victorious	Won	United States
Big Time Rush	Nominated	United States
ICarly	Nominated	United States
Glee	Nominated	United States

=== Favourite Actor ===
Artist/Character	Series/Teen-Drama	Result	Country
Andrés Mercado/Daniel	Grachi	Nominated	Colombia
Gaston Soffritti/Martin	Graduados	Nominated	Argentina
Victorio D' Alessandro/Ciro	Los Únicos	Nominated	Argentina
Pablo Espinosa/Tomás	Violetta	Won	Spain

=== Revelation ===
Artist/Character	Series/Teen-Drama	Result	Country
Sol Rodríguez/Mecha	Grachi	Nominated	Argentina
Macarena Achaga/Leonora	Miss XV	Nominated	Argentina
Chino Darín/Marco	Los Únicos	Nominated	Argentina
Martina Stoessel/Violetta	Violetta	Won	Argentina

=== Favourite Radio Program ===
Radio Program	Radio Station	Result	Country
Comunidad TKM	Radio TKM	Nominated	Argentina
Resacados	Los 40 Principales	Nominated	Argentina
Despertador	Radio Disney	Nominated	Argentina
Maratón de Fin de Semana	Radio Disney	Won	Argentina

=== Favourite Movie ===
Movie	Result	Country
The Twilight Saga: Breaking Dawn (Amanecer)	Won	United States
The Muppets (Los Muppets)	Nominated	United States
The Avengers (Los Vengadores)	Nominated	United States
Harry Potter and the Deathly Hallows – Part 2 (Harry Potter y las Reliquias de la Muerte - Parte 2)	Nominated	United Kingdom

=== Favourite Latin Artist or Group ===
Artist/Band	Result	Country
Axel	Won	Argentina
Carlos Baute	Nominated	Venezuela
Restart	Nominated	Brazil
Tan Biónica	Nominated	Argentina

=== Sportsman of the Year ===
Player	Result	Country
Juan Martín del Potro	Nominated	Argentina
Luciana Aymar	Won	Argentina
Manu Ginóbili	Nominated	Argentina
Sergio "Kun" Agüero	Nominated	Argentina

=== Pro-Social Award ===
Pro-Social Award
Patricia Sosa
