= List of I Am Frankie episodes =

I Am Frankie is an American drama television series based on a story created by Marcela Citterio that aired on Nickelodeon from September 4, 2017 to October 4, 2018. Based on Yo soy Franky, the series focuses on Alex Hook in the titular role of Frankie Gaines, an android who is attempting to pass herself off as a normal teenage girl.

== Series overview ==
Season	Episodes	Originally released	
Season	Episodes	First released	Last released
1	19	September 11, 2017	October 6, 2017
2	21	August 11, 2018	October 4, 2018

== Episodes ==
=== Pilot (2017) ===
Title	Directed by	Written by	Original release date	Prod. code	U.S. viewers (millions)
"I Am... a Gaines"	Steve Wright	Charlotte Owen	September 4, 2017 (Note: The first half of "I Am... in Danger" was aired as the sneak peek on Nickelodeon on September 4, 2017, and is titled "I Am... a Gaines". The full episode was then shown as part of the official Nickelodeon premiere on September 11, 2017. The second half is also known as "I Am... in a Math Bee".)	101	1.27
EGG scientist Sigourney Gaines creates an android called Frankie and sneaks her out of EGG as a way to keep Mr. Kingston from having WARPA use her for Project Q. In order to keep Frankie from being found by EGG, Sigourney moves her family to the next town over and they settle in with the help of former EGG employee James Peters. Once enrolled in school, Frankie befriends a girl named Dayton and gains a girl named Tammy as a rival. Guest stars: JC Casely as Casey, Victor Jones as Mr. Manhart Absent: Kyson Facer as Andrew, Jayce Mroz as Robbie

=== Season 1 (2017) ===
No. overall	No. in season	Title	Directed by	Written by	Original release date	Prod. code	U.S. viewers (millions)
1	1	"I Am... in Danger"	Steve Wright	Charlotte Owen	September 11, 2017	101–102	1.47
EGG scientist Sigourney Gaines creates an android called Frankie and sneaks her out of EGG as a way to keep Mr. Kingston from having WARPA use her for Project Q. In order to keep Frankie from being found by EGG, Sigourney moves her family to the next town over and they settle in with the help of former EGG employee James. Once enrolled in school, Frankie befriends a girl named Dayton and gains a girl named Tammy as a rival. Later, after Cole saves Frankie from the rain, Sigourney works to dry her out and finds that some of her circuits got fused together. Meanwhile, Mr. Kingston sends PEGS1 to search Sigourney's old house to find the whereabouts of the Gaines family. Guest stars: JC Casely as Casey, Victor Jones as Mr. Manhart Absent: Kyson Facer as Andrew, Jayce Mroz as Robbie Note: This is a double-length special episode.
2	2	"I Am... a Rom-Com Fan"	Steve Wright	Jeff Sayers	September 12, 2017	103	1.32
Absent: Kyson Facer as Andrew, Jayce Mroz as Robbie, Joy Kigin as Ms. Hough
3	3	"I Am... a Radio?"	Siobhan Devine	Charotte Owen and Elle Andrews	September 13, 2017	104	1.46
Guest stars: Victor Jones as Mr. Manhart, Justin Jarzombeck as John, Rachael Thompson as Engineer Absent: Kyson Facer as Andrew, Jayce Mroz as Robbie, Joy Kigin as Ms. Hough
4	4	"I Am... My Enemy's Friend?"	Siobhan Devine	Charlotte Owen	September 14, 2017	105	1.29
Guest stars: Jeanne Bennett as Ms. Kagan, Justin Jarzombeck as John, Victor Jones as Mr. Manhart, Rachael Thompson as Engineer Absent: Kyson Facer as Andrew, Jayce Mroz as Robbie, Todd Allen Durkin as James Peters
5	5	"I Am... Battery Operated"	Siobhan Devine	Jeff Sayers	September 15, 2017	106	1.30
Absent: Kyson Facer as Andrew, Jayce Mroz as Robbie, Joy Kigin as Ms. Hough
6	6	"I Am... Heartbroken"	Siobhan Devine	Charotte Owen and Elle Andrews	September 18, 2017	107	1.14
Guest star: Justin Jarzombeck as John
7	7	"I Am... Lost"	Siobhan Devine	Jeff Sayers	September 19, 2017	108	1.22
Guest star: Justin Jarzombeck as John
8	8	"I Am... Disconnected"	Steve Wright	Elle Andrews	September 20, 2017	109	1.19
Guest stars: Victor Jones as Mr. Manhart, Rachael Thompson as Engineer Anderson Absent: Uriel Baldesco as Lucia, Kristi Beckett as Makayla
9	9	"I Am... Crashing"	Siobhan Devine	Jeff Sayers	September 21, 2017	110	1.10
Guest stars: Justin Jarzombeck as John, Victor Jones as Mr. Manhart, Rachael Thompson as Engineer Anderson Absent: Michael Laurino as Will Gaines
10	10	"I Am... Speechless"	Siobhan Devine	Jeff Sayers	September 22, 2017	111	1.33
Guest stars: JC Casely as Casey, Justin Jarzombeck as John, Katherine McDonald as Mrs. Mulligan, Rachael Thompson as Engineer Anderson Absent: Michael Laurino as Will Gaines
11	11	"I Am... Hungry"	Siobhan Devine	Elle Andrews	September 25, 2017	112	1.17
As Sepulveda High's halls have been vandalized, Frankie discovers that she has two dates to the prom. To help her blend in, Dayton works with Frankie and Sigourney into making an e-stomach so that Frankie can eat food without malfunctioning. Meanwhile at EGG, Mr. Kingston and PEGS1 start to put their plans to reclaim Frankie into motion. Guest stars: JC Casely as Casey, Justin Jarzombeck as John, Rachael Thompson as Engineer Anderson
12	12	"I Am... Remote Controlled"	Steve Wright	Charlotte Owen	September 26, 2017	113	1.07
Guest star: Rachael Thompson as Engineer Anderson Absent: Jayce Mroz as Robbie, Todd Allen Durkin as James Peters, Joy Kigin as Ms. Hough
13	13	"I Am... Suspended"	Steve Wright	Elle Andrews	September 27, 2017	114	1.11
Ms. Hough blames Frankie for the vandalism that took place at Sepulveda High and has her suspended from school. James orchestrates events that involves him deleting specific files from Frankie which leads to Sigourney having to take an action to keep Frankie from becoming a violent android. Meanwhile, representatives from WARPA confiscate PEGS1 upon Mr. Kingston's failure to reclaim Frankie as he finds a clue on where Sigourney is hiding Frankie. At the same time, Tammy still wants to prove that Frankie is a robot and plans to get her unsuspended by pinning the blame for the vandalism on someone else. Guest stars: Justin Jarzombeck as John, Victor Jones as Mr. Manhart, David Kelley as WARPA Agent, Rachael Thompson as Engineer Anderson Absent: Kyson Facer as Andrew
14	14	"I Am... Not Alone"	Steve Wright	Jeff Sayers	September 28, 2017	115	1.09
Now that Tammy's plot to get Frankie unsuspended has succeeded, she still makes plans to expose Frankie as a robot where she, Lucia, and Makayla work on a pulley system that will enable her to spill water on Frankie at the Emoji-themed dance. Sigourney forbids Frankie from going to the dance, because she considers it a huge safety risk. Guest stars: Justin Jarzombeck as John, Elgin Aponte as DJ Absent: Jayce Mroz as Robbie, Joy Kigin as Ms. Hough
15	15	"I Am... Hot on the Trail"	Steve Wright	Charlotte Owen	October 2, 2017	116	1.35
Now that Frankie and Dayton know that Andrew is an android, they plan to find out who created him. Ms. Hough begins an investigation on who attempted the water prank on Frankie. Meanwhile, operatives from WARPA plan to use PEGS1 as leverage on Mr. Kingston in order to reclaim Frankie, but PEGS1 plans his escape from WARPA. Guest stars: Justin Jarzombeck as John, Elgin Aponte as DJ, Susan Dean as Ms. Fleckenstein, David Kelley as WARPA Agent Absent: J.D. Ballard as Mr. Kingston
16	16	"I Am... Hanging Out with a Boy"	Steve Wright	Elle Andrews	October 3, 2017	117	1.29
Andrew begs Frankie not to tell Sigourney about him. After her Sepulveda High School's Brain Squad refuses to do any activities until Tammy comes clean to Ms. Hough about falsely accusing Robbie of the school vandalism. Ms. Hough announces to the school that Robbie is exonerated, but she threatens to punish the entire school if the person responsible for the vandalism doesn't come forward. Meanwhile, Frankie plays mini golf with Cole. James orders Andrew to lure Frankie into a trap that James and Mr. Kingston have devised. Guest stars: Justin Jarzombeck as John, David Kelley as WARPA Agent 1
17	17	"I Am... Bound for Glory"	Siobhan Devine	Jeff Sayers	October 4, 2017	118	1.19
WARPA has started making threats to Mr. Kingston and James to get them Frankie or else. James threatens Andrew that if he doesn't lure Frankie to the trap, he will be deactivated. After Mr. Kingston visits Dayton and Cole it is revealed that he is their father and his true name is Tom Reyes. Dayton enlists Jenny to help warn Frankie about Andrew, as Cole wonders if Tammy is right about Frankie being a robot. Guest stars: Rachael Thompson as Engineer Anderson, David Kelley as WARPA Agent Absent: Michael Laurino as Will Gaines, Carrie Schroeder as Sigourney Gaines, Mark Jacobson as Voice of "PEGS1"
18	18	"I Am... Caught"	Steve Wright	Elle Andrews	October 5, 2017	119	1.28
After Cole figures out that Frankie is a robot, Dayton frantically tries to warn Frankie that her father and WARPA are closing in on her. Upon hearing about what happened when Cole visited Frankie, Sigourney considers moving the family again to keep Frankie safe. In addition, Dayton persuades Tammy to help her hack into WARPA's classified website in order to find out more about WARPA. Guest star: David Kelley as WARPA Agent Absent: Mark Jacobson as Voice of "PEGS1"
19	19	"I Am... a Sitting Duck"	Steve Wright	Charlotte Owen	October 6, 2017	120	1.13
Before the competition starts, Tammy returns to the team after being taken by WARPA, who did something to her so that she is acting nicely. During the Brain Squad competition, Dayton and Cole try to warn Frankie that WARPA is closing in on her, as Andrew starts to reveal his true allegiance. Meanwhile, a girl who looks exactly like Frankie arrives at the Gaines residence who is revealed to be Eliza, an android that Dr. Gaines made before Frankie, as Sigourney and Will look for possible places to relocate. Guest stars: Alex Hook as Eliza, David Kelley as WARPA Agent 1, Ame Livinston as Head Judge Absent: Sophia Forest as Jenny Gaines, Joy Kigin as Ms. Hough, Mark Jacobson as Voice of "PEGS1"

=== Season 2 (2018) ===
No. overall	No. in season	Title	Directed by	Written by	Original release date	Prod. code	U.S. viewers (millions)
20	1	"I Am... Eliza"	Steve Wright	Charlotte Owen	August 11, 2018	201–202	0.90
As Frankie and Cole are laying low from EGG and WARPA, they use a coffee shop and its Wi-Fi to send a message to Sigourney. Meanwhile, Eliza continues posing as Frankie when she encounters Dayton. This later leads to a showdown between Frankie and Eliza which ends with Frankie being victorious. Sigourney has Eliza strapped down as she plans to reprogram her. While learning that Mr. Kingston is Dayton's father, Sigourney takes a call from Mr. Kingston on Dayton's cell phone where she is told to keep Frankie as WARPA found another android. As Frankie makes plans to rescue Andrew from WARPA, a sound is heard upstairs where the Gaines family has discovered that Eliza has escaped. Guest stars: Alex Hook as Eliza, Elgin Aponte as Barista, J. Scott Browning as WARPA Tech, Tracy Wiu as Sr. WARPA Tech Absent: J.D. Ballard as Mr. Kingston, Todd Allen Durkin as James Peters, Amina Alzouma as Rachel, Zachary S. Williams as Zane, Tommi Rose as Simone, Jayme Lake as Cynthia, Ashton Heathcoat as Beto Note: This is a double-length special episode.
21	2	"I Am... Planning an Escape"	Steve Wright	Jeff Sayers	September 10, 2018	203	0.92
As Frankie makes plans to rescue Andrew from WARPA, Sepulveda High School gets new students in the form of Zane Markosian and Rachel. Meanwhile at WARPA's headquarters, Andrew pays the price for not cooperating with WARPA. Guest stars: J. Scott Browning as WARPA Tech, Tracy Wiu as Sr. WARPA Tech Absent: J.D. Ballard as Mr. Kingston, Todd Allen Durkin as James Peters, Tommi Rose as Simone, Jayme Lake as Cynthia, Ashton Heathcoat as Beto
22	3	"I Am... Taking a Break"	Steve Wright	Elle Andrews	September 11, 2018	204	0.91
Guest stars: J. Scott Browning as WARPA Tech, Tracy Wiu as Sr. WARPA Tech, Robert Small as Dr. Sykes Absent: Uriel Baldesco as Lucia, Kristi Beckett as Makayla, Todd Allen Durkin as James Peters, Joy Kigin as Ms. Hough, Jayme Lake as Cynthia, Ashton Heathcoat as Beto
23	4	"I Am... Buggin' "	Melanie Orr	Stacey Greenberger	September 12, 2018	205	0.79
Guest stars: J. Scott Browning as WARPA Tech, Tracy Wiu as Sr. WARPA Tech, Robert Small as Dr. Sykes Absent: J.D. Ballard as Mr. Kingston, Todd Allen Durkin as James Peters, Ashton Heathcoat as Beto
24	5	"I Am... Compromised"	Melanie Orr	Gloria Shen	September 13, 2018	206	0.76
Guest stars: J. Scott Browning as WARPA Tech, Tracy Wiu as Sr. WARPA Tech, Robert Small as Dr. Sykes Absent: J.D. Ballard as Mr. Kingston, Todd Allen Durkin as James Peters, Joy Kigin as Ms. Hough, Amina Alzouma as Rachel, Ashton Heathcoat as Beto
25	6	"I Am... Busting Out"	Steve Wright	Charlotte Owen	September 14, 2018	207	0.79
Guest star: Robert Small as Dr. Sykes Absent: Uriel Baldesco as Lucia, Kristi Beckett as Makayla, Mohana Krishnan as Tammy, Joy Kigin as Ms. Hough, Amina Alzouma as Rachel, Zachary S. Williams as Zane, Jayme Lake as Cynthia, Ashton Heathcoat as Beto
26	7	"I Am... Under Suspicion"	Steve Wright	Jeff Sayers	September 17, 2018	208	0.64
Guest stars: J. Scott Browning as WARPA Tech, Tracy Wiu as Sr. WARPA Tech Absent: Uriel Baldesco as Lucia, Kristi Beckett as Makayla, Mohana Krishnan as Tammy, Joy Kigin as Ms. Hough, Amina Alzouma as Rachel, Zachary S. Williams as Zane
27	8	"I Am... Not Myself"	Melanie Orr	Liam Henry	September 18, 2018	209	0.75
Guest stars: J. Scott Browning as WARPA Tech, Tracy Wiu as Sr. WARPA Tech, Bruce Michael as Mr. Miffler Absent: Uriel Baldesco as Lucia, Kristi Beckett as Makayla, Amina Alzouma as Rachel, Jayme Lake as Cynthia, Ashton Heathcoat as Beto
28	9	"I Am... Next"	Steve Wright	Jeff Sayers	September 19, 2018	210	0.66
Guest stars: J. Scott Browning as WARPA Tech, Tracy Wiu as Sr. WARPA Tech, Tangil Colombel as Olivier Absent: Joy Kigin as Ms. Hough, Ashton Heathcoat as Beto
29	10	"I Am... a Creature"	Melanie Orr	Gloria Shen	September 20, 2018	211	0.89
Guest star: Aniela McGuinness as Ms. Lee Absent: J.D. Ballard as Mr. Kingston
30	11	"I Am... an Android"	Melanie Orr	Charlotte Owen	September 21, 2018	212	0.81
Guest stars: Todd Bruno as Ace Hartrue, Clayton Johnson as Dolph, Sean Patrick Dawson as Lundgren Absent: Sophia Forest as Jenny Gaines, Todd Allen Durkin as James Peters, Michael Laurino as Will Gaines, Carrie Schroeder as Sigourney Gaines
31	12	"I Am... Frankensteena"	Steve Wright	Elle Andrews	September 24, 2018	213	0.73
Absent: Sophia Forest as Jenny Gaines, Michael Laurino as Will Gaines, Carrie Schroeder as Sigourney Gaines
32	13	"I Am... Part of a Plan"	Steve Wright	Liam Henry	September 25, 2018	214	0.69
James is suspicious of Simone where he thinks that WARPA is using her to spy on him after seeing her glitch out. This leads to him and Andrew getting into an argument. With the help of Rachel, Frankie and Dayton are able to get into WARPA's encrypted file to learn about WARPA's upcoming plans. Guest stars: J. Scott Browning as WARPA Tech, Tracy Wiu as Sr. WARPA Tech, Tangil Colombel as Olivier, Clayton Johnson as Dolph, Sean Patrick Dawson as Lundgren Absent: Zachary S. Williams as Zane
33	14	"I Am... in Trouble with Mom"	Melanie Orr	Jeff Sayers	September 26, 2018	215	0.79
Guest stars: J. Scott Browning as WARPA Tech, Tracy Wiu as Sr. WARPA Tech, Aniela McGuinness as Ms. Lee, Clayton Johnson as Dolph, Sean Patrick Dawson as Lundgren Absent: J.D. Ballard as Mr. Kingston, Amina Alzouma as Rachel
34	15	"I Am... an Android... or Am I?"	Melanie Orr	Stacey Greenberger	September 27, 2018	216	0.87
Guest stars: J. Scott Browning as WARPA Tech, Tracy Wiu as Sr. WARPA Tech, Maria Esponda as Ms. Salas Absent: Todd Allen Durkin as James Peters, Joy Kigin as Ms. Hough
35	16	"I Am... Jealous"	Steve Wright	Charlotte Owen	September 28, 2018	217	0.85
Guest stars: J. Scott Browning as WARPA Tech, Tracy Wiu as Sr. WARPA Tech, Todd Bruno as Ace Hartrue Absent: Sophia Forest as Jenny Gaines, Mohana Krishnan as Tammy, Todd Allen Durkin as James Peters, Ashton Heathcoat as Beto
36	17	"I Am... in Need of a Plan"	Steve Wright	Gloria Shen	October 1, 2018	218	0.69
Guest stars: J. Scott Browning as WARPA Tech, Tracy Wiu as Sr. WARPA Tech, Bruce Michael as Mr. Miffler, Aniela McGuinness as Ms. Lee, Todd Bruno as Ace Hartrue Absent: Carrie Schroeder as Sigourney Gaines, Zachary S. Williams as Zane, Ashton Heathcoat as Beto
37	18	"I Am... a Puppet on a String"	Melanie Orr	Elle Andrews and Jeff Sayers	October 2, 2018	219	0.66
Guest stars: J. Scott Browning as WARPA Tech, Tracy Wiu as Sr. WARPA Tech, José Garza Beau, Clayton Johnson as Dolph, Sean Dawson as Lundgren Absent: Joy Kigin as Ms. Hough
38	19	"I Am... Out of Options"	Melanie Orr	Liam Henry	October 3, 2018	220	0.76
Now that WARPA has control over the space station that Sigourney is on and Cole and Mr. Kingston as their prisoners, Cynthia gives Frankie the option to turn herself over to WARPA at their headquarters or else. With no other choice, Frankie goes to turn herself in. In order to save Frankie, Cole, Mr. Kingston, and the space station, Jenny, Will, and Dayton turn to James for help. Guest stars: J. Scott Browning as WARPA Tech, Tracy Wiu as Sr. WARPA Tech, Clayton Johnson as Dolph, Sean Dawson as Lundgren, Todd Bruno as Ace Hartrue Absent: Uriel Baldesco as Lucia, Kristi Beckett as Makayla, Mohana Krishnan as Tammy, Joy Kigin as Ms. Hough
39	20	"I Am... Being Blackmailed"	Steve Wright	Gloria Shen	October 4, 2018	221	0.81
With the space station still being threatened, Frankie has to cooperate with Cynthia and WARPA into letting them copy her data so that they can get to work on their H.R.O. (short for Human Robot Organism) project. Meanwhile, Andrew and Simone infiltrate the Rhombus as Cole is selected to be the first H.R.O. Guest stars: J. Scott Browning as WARPA Tech, Tracy Wiu as Sr. WARPA Tech Absent: Uriel Baldesco as Lucia, Kristi Beckett as Makayla, Mohana Krishnan as Tammy, Joy Kigin as Ms. Hough, Carrie Schroeder as Sigourney Gaines, Ashton Heathcoat as Beto
40	21	"I Am... Changed"	Steve Wright	Charlotte Owen	October 4, 2018	222	0.74
With help from Rachel, Jenny gets control of Beto in order to find the computer that has control over the space station. Meanwhile, Andrew, Simone, and Mr. Kingston work to escape their imprisonment. When WARPA's plans fail, the FBI storm the building which leads to Cynthia and those involved getting arrested and WARPA being shut down while the Gaines family gains custody of Beto. Before the production of "Frankensteena," Frankie and Cole share a moment which leads to Frankie understanding love and getting a heart. Guest stars: J. Scott Browning as WARPA Tech, Tracy Wiu as Sr. WARPA Tech, Clayton Royal Johnson as Dolph, Sean Dawson as Lundgren, Arlyn Broche as FBI Agent Absent: Joy Kigin as Ms. Hough

== Special (2017) ==
Title	Original release date	Prod. code	U.S. viewers (millions)
"I Am Frankie... the Download"	September 29, 2017	998	1.14
A clip show on what has transpired through "I Am... Not Alone", as well as clips from the remaining episodes of the season. Guest stars: Jean-Carlos Casely as Casey, Victor Jones as Mr. Manhart
