= Danielle Arciniegas =

Colombian actress

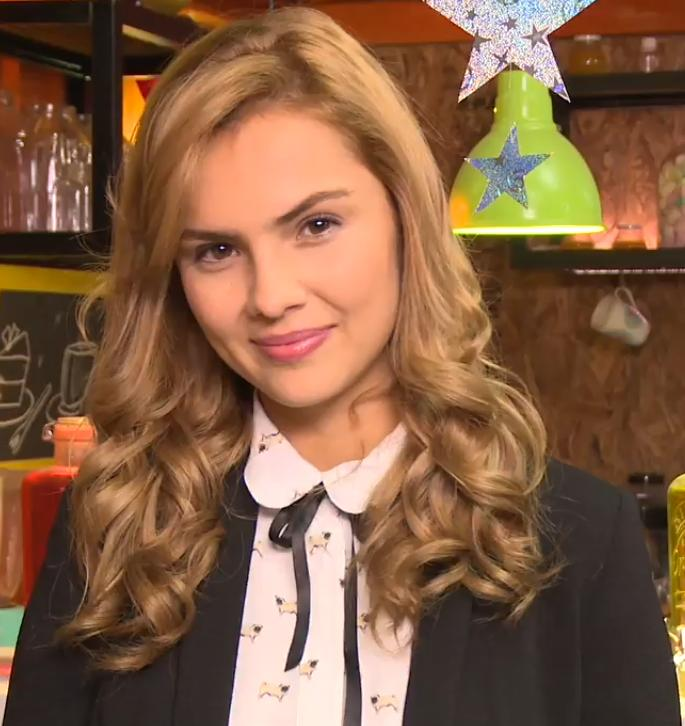
- Danielle Arciniegas in 2016
- Born: 22 May 1992 (age 34); Pereira, Colombia
- Education: Free University of Colombia
- Occupations: Actress, model and singer
- Years active: 1997–present

Danielle Arciniegas Martínez is a Colombian actress, model, and singer. She is known for her participation in the television productions: Esmeraldas and Hilos de sangre azul and in the Nickelodeon Latin America series Yo soy Franky, where she plays the role of Tamara Franco and in Francisco el Matemático: Clase 2017 with the role of María Mónica Sánchez 'Barby's.

In 2016 Arciniegas won the Chica Trendy award at the third installment of the Kids Choice Awards Colombia.

== Early life ==
Danielle was born in Pereira, Colombia on 22 May 1992, the daughter of Germán Ossa, a film critic, and Margarita Martínez. She has two siblings, Alejandro and Juliana. Arciniegas grew up in an artistic family environment, as her father was the director of the Pereira Film Critics Meeting. She completed part of primary school and all of secondary school at La Enseñanza school.

== Career ==
=== 1997–2008: Early work ===
At only four years old, Danielle had her first appearance on Colombian television in the series Los niños invisibles, directed by Lisandro Duque . Later she had her first cinematographic experience in the film Los últimos malos días de Guillermino, directed by Gloria Nancy Monsalve in 2002. She also participated as the protagonist in the short film El pacto in 2008.

=== 2009–2014: Studies and acting takeoff ===
Arciniegas studied law at the Universidad Libre (Colombia) at the Pereira headquarters, where she worked as a presenter on the newscasts of said university. For a while she worked in the courts in Bogotá . She, however, decided to pursue an acting career, for which the beginning of her courtship with the Colombian actor Sebastián Vega would be key . Arciniegas moved to Bogotá to accompany Sebastián in his acting career. That's where she began to get job opportunities. Her first opportunity was an appearance in the series Tu voz estéreo in 2014. She later performed roles in the second season of Cumbia Ninjaand in the international production of RTI Who killed Patricia Soler? . Danielle also starred in the role of Verónica Guerrero in the Caracol Televisión series Esmeraldas, a young rebellious daughter of the mayor of the town.

=== 2015: Threads of Blue Blood ===
Danielle played the role of Lola Garcés in the RCN Televisión telenovela Hilos de Sangre Azul . Lola is a mischievous teenager, but she hides a past full of abuse and violence. Described by Arciniegas herself as "a very risky, mischievous, passionate character who always does what she sets out to do", the role of Lola marked Danielle, since she considers that she is the reflection of many Colombian women.

=== 2015–2016: Success of Yo soy Franky ===
In September 2015, the original Nickelodeon Latin America series Yo soy Franky premieres, where Danielle plays the antagonistic role with her character Tamara Franco, a very intelligent and computer-savvy teenager whose goal is to make Franky's life miserable. the protagonist played by María Gabriela de Faría but her whole life changes in the second season when she meets Andrés, starring Andrés Mercado, an android who falls completely in love with Tamara. The series was a complete success, leading the audiences of adolescent audiences in Argentina, Colombia, Mexico and El Salvador ., for which it was renewed for a second season divided into two parts, which was broadcast in the course of 2016. Yo soy Franky made Arciniegas known throughout Latin America and together with his fellow staff they won the award for Program of Favorite TV at the 2016 Kids Choice Awards Colombia . In addition, Danielle was nominated for Favorite Villain and won the Trendy Girl award. The series had its end in December 2016.

=== 2017: Francis the Mathematician ===
Arciniegas starred in the role of María Mónica Sánchez "la interesa de la barbys" in the Colombian television series Francisco el Matemático: Clase 2017. Danielle embodies "La Barby's", the pretty girl from school, with a pretty face and a perfect body : she hates poverty and madly loves money and jewelry, and does not hesitate to use her beauty to get what she wants. She is calculating, interested and superficial, but also somewhat naive.

== Filmography ==
=== Television ===
Year	Title	Character	Channel
2021	Lala's Spa	Genoveva Rubio	Canal RCN
2018–2019	María Magdalena	Salome	Azteca 7
2018–2019	Loquito por ti	Yaneth Arango	Caracol Television
2017	Francisco el Matemático: Clase 2017	Maria Monica Sanchez 'La Barby's'	Canal RCN
2016	Hilos de sangre azul	Lola Garces	Canal RCN
2015–2016	Yo soy Franky	Tamara Franco	Nickelodeon Latin America
2015	Hermanitas Calle	Julieta Martinez	Caracol Television
2015	Esmeraldas	Veronica Guerrero	Caracol Television
2015	¿Quién mató a Patricia Soler?	Juliana	MundoFox
2014–2015	Cumbia Ninja	Viviana	Fox Channel
2013–2014	Tu voz estéreo	Various characters	Caracol Television
2008	The Pact		
1997	The invisible children		

=== Cinema ===
Year	Title	Character	Note
2021	Kally's Mashup A Very Kally Birthday!	Wintir	
2016	Paul	Sandra	
2016	The Amazing Days of Guillermino	Sister	

== Awards and nominations ==
Year	award	Category	Worked	Result
2016	Kids Choice Awards Mexico	Favorite Villain	I am Franky	Nominated
2016	Kids Choice Awards Colombia	Favorite Villain	I am Franky	Nominated
2016	Kids Choice Awards Colombia	Trendy Girl	I am Franky	Won
2016	Kids Choice Awards Argentina	Favorite Villain	I am Franky	Nominated
2017	TVyNovelas Awards (Colombia)	Best Supporting Actress in a Series	Francis the Mathematician	Nominated
2017	Kids Choice Awards Colombia	Favorite actress	Francis the Mathematician	Nominated
