= Lance Dos Ramos =

Venezuelan actor, model and animator

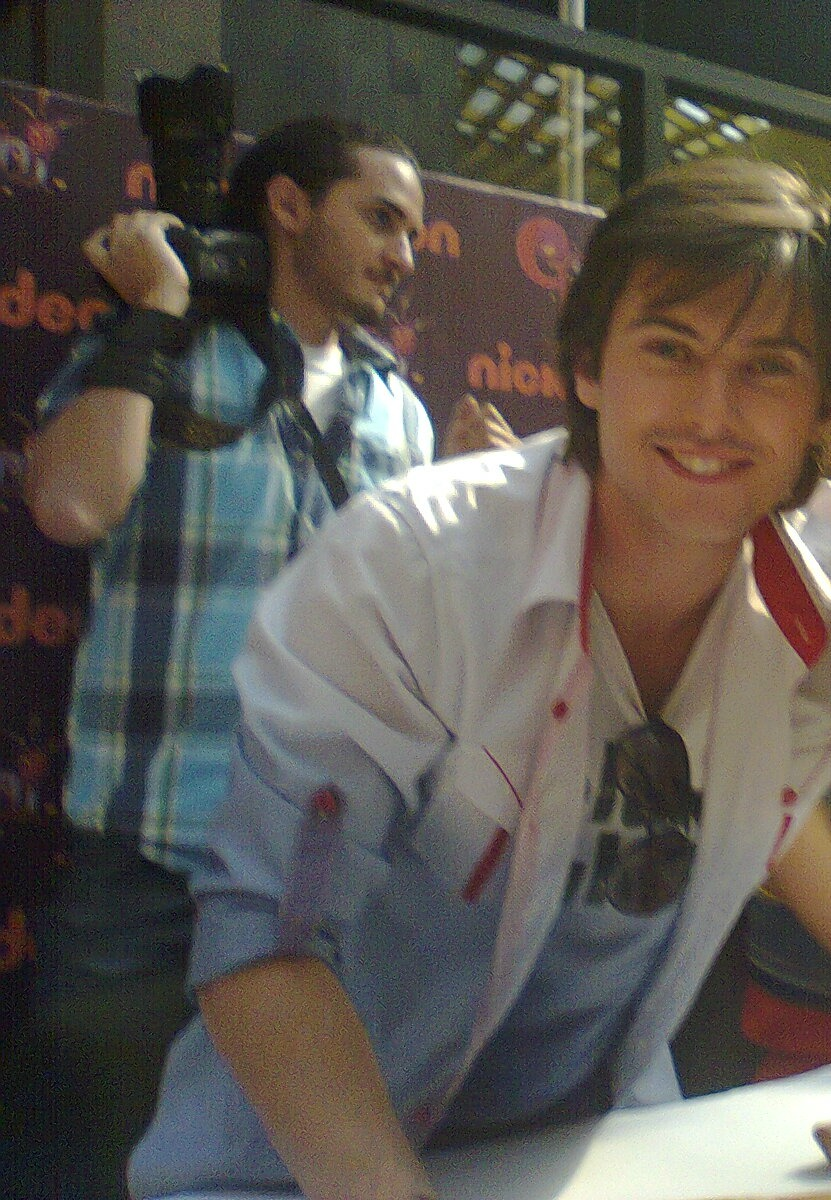
- Born: Lance Dos Ramos De Sousa; April 4, 1985 (age 40); Caracas, Venezuela
- Occupation(s): Actor, model and animator

Lance Dos Ramos (born 4 April 1985) is a Venezuelan actor, model and animator.

== Biography ==
He was born in Caracas, the son of Portuguese immigrants. He is the brother of actress Kimberly Dos Ramos.

He is best known for the role of Chema Esquivel in the series Grachi. In 2011 he participated in the Venezuelan film "Memoirs of a Soldier" which was released in 2012.

== Filmography ==
| Year | Title | Role | Channel |
|---|---|---|---|
| 1997 | Destino de mujer | | Venevisión |
| 1999 | Cuando Hay Pasion | | Venevisión |
| 2004 | Sabor a ti | | Venevisión |
| 2007 | Te tengo en salsa | | RCTV |
| 2008-2009 | Nadie me dirá como quererte | Carlos Aristigueta | RCTV Internacional |
| 2011-2013 | Grachi | Chema Esquivel | Nickelodeon Latinoamerica |
| 2011 | Memorias de un Soldado | Marcos | Venevisión |
| 2013-2014 | Marido en Alquiler | Víctor | Telemundo |
| 2014 | Demente criminal | Anthony | Univision Venevisión |
