= Grachi =

Teen TV series broadcast by Nickelodeon

- Genre: Fantasy; Drama; Romance
- Created by: Mariela Romero
- Written by: Catharina Ledeboer, Mariana Palos, Rosalba Pico Estrada, Diego Vago
- Directed by: Luis Manzo, Arturo Manuitt
- Starring: Isabella Castillo; Andrés Mercado; Sol Rodríguez
- Opening theme: Grachi by Isabella Castillo (s. 1); Grachi Remix by Isabella Castillo (s. 2–3)
- Ending theme: Grachi by Isabella Castillo (s. 1); Magia by Isabella Castillo, Kimberly Dos Ramos and Maria Gabriela de Faría (s. 2), Alma en Dos & Soñar No Cuesta Nada by Isabella Castillo (s. 3)
- Composer: Santiago Dobles
- Country of origin: United States
- Original language: Spanish
- No. of seasons: 3
- No. of episodes: 205

Production
- Executive producers: Tatiana Rodriguez, JC Acosta
- Running time: 45 minutes (approx.)
- Production company: Cinemat

Original release
- Network: Nickelodeon
- Release: May 2, 2011 – May 10, 2013

Related
- Every Witch Way, WITS Academy

Grachi is a Spanish-language American fantasy TV series produced by Nickelodeon Latin America and created by Mariela Romero. The series stars Isabella Castillo as Grachi and Andrés Mercado as Daniel; also featuring Danilo Carrera, Kimberly Dos Ramos, Mauricio Henao, Sol Rodríguez, Lance Dos Ramos, María Gabriela de Faría, Willy Martin & Jesús Neyra in supporting roles. The series was filmed in Miami, Florida, United States, becoming the first Nickelodeon Latin American series to be recorded out of Latin America, and also the first to be recorded on high definition. It premiered on Nickelodeon Latin America on May 2, 2011. A second season began airing on February 27, 2012 & a third and last season began airing from March 4 to May 10, 2013.

The series follows the adventures of a teenage girl who, while adjusting to a new town, new school, rivalry, love and the everyday problems of being a teenager, discovers she has magical powers.

In 2021 Nickelodeon began plans to film a theater film of Grachi, which was about to be filmed and produced in 2023 at the beach of Cartagena, Colombia, but the project got scrapped after Nickelodeon Latin America decided to stop producing Latin American content, most of Nickelodeon Latin America's workers were fired and the TV signal of Nickelodeon in Latin America changed to the signal of Nickelodeon Scandinavia with a Latin American Spanish dub, members of the cast of Grachi like Isabella Castillo, Sol Rodríguez and Willy Martin talked about the film on their social media and interviews, and also the cast of Grachi dedicated kind messages to all of the Nickelodeon Latin America's workers and head executives who were fired, including the former presidents of Nickelodeon and executive producers of Grachi, JC Acosta and Tatiana Rodríguez.

== Summary ==
=== Season 1 ===
The season centers on Grachi (Isabella Castillo), a witch and a new student in Escolarium. She deals with using her magic and trying to find out how to defeat the Principal (an evil witch who tries to steal the powers of Grachi so she can be the most powerful witch). Grachi also deals with her rival, Matilda (Kimberly Dos Ramos) with whom she fights for the love of Daniel (Andrés Mercado). At the end of the season, Matilda celebrates her 16th birthday at the night of the eclipse while the Principal (Martha Pabon) and Sibilo (William Valdes) plan to steal the powers of Matilda and Grachi. The two girls team up and fight the Principal, turning her into a dog, but losing their powers. Matilda finally realizes that Grachi and Daniel are meant to be together.

=== Season 2 ===
A new witch named Mía arrives in town. Unfortunately, she falls in love with Daniel, Grachi's boyfriend. So she manipulates Grachi into a false friendship in order to win over Daniel (who is not insensitive to her charms).

Along with Mía comes the Witches' Council, who remind Grachi of her responsibilities. But one of them has evil intentions towards Grachi and wants to win the heart of Francisco, who is Matilda's mother along with Ursula. Matilda, for her part, enters into an intermittent relationship with Diego and wants her powers back.

At the end of the season, Grachi dreams of a mysterious boy to whom she seems close: Axel.

=== Season 3 ===
Grachi's life is turned upside down the day she meets a young wizard: Axel Velez, who will become both her lover and her enemy. Grachi starts school at the wizards' college that Tony had told her about. There, Grachi learns much more about her role as a chosen one, while her heart is caught between her human and witch life, and her relationships with Daniel, her first love, and Axel, her newfound love.

== Background ==
The show was produced by Nickelodeon Latin America and written by Venezuelan author Mariela Romero. Nickelodeon's Vice President of Programming and Creative Strategy, Tatiana Rodriguez commented that:

This project demonstrates our continued commitment to the region and local talent. We are excited to bring a little bit of magic for Latin American fans and we're confident that Grachi will provide many hours of fascinating humor, romance and fun for all our audience

The series uses advanced production technology and 3D effects under the management of FX and animation production house Pixelhangar. Executive producers were Solange Rivero & Yuldor Gutierrez for Season 1 and José Vicente Scheuren for Season 2 and 3.

== Cast ==
=== Main ===
Actor	Character	Season		
Actor	Character	1	2	3
Isabella Castillo	Graciela "Grachi" Alonso	Main	Main	Main
Isabella Castillo	Grachi (Clone)		Recurring	Main
Andrés Mercado	Daniel Esquivel	Main	Main	Main
Kimberly Dos Ramos	Matilda Román	Main	Main	
Mauricio Henao	Antonio "Tony" Gordillo	Main	Main	Guest
Sol Rodríguez	Mercedes "Mecha" Estévez	Main	Main	Main
Lance Dos Ramos	José Manuel "Chema" Esquivel	Main	Main	
Sharlene Taule	Kathiusca "Katty"	Main	Recurring	Recurring
María del Pilar Pérez	Dorothea "Dotty"	Main	Recurring	Recurring
Alexandra Pomales	Beatrice "Betty"	Main		
Liannet Borrego	Cussy Canosa	Main		
Lino Martone	Julio	Main		
Evaluna Montaner	Melanie Esquivel	Main	Recurring	
Cristian Campocasso	Luis Esquivel	Main	Recurring	Recurring
Andrés Cotrino	Roberto Esquivel	Main	Recurring	
Katie Barberi	Úrsula de Román	Special Appearances	Special Appearances	Special Appearances
Ramiro Fumazoni	Francisco Alonso	Special Appearances	Special Appearances	Special Appearances
Rafael de la Fuente	Diego Forlán	Recurring	Main	Main
María Gabriela de Faría	Mía Novoa	Guest	Main	Main
Willy Martin	Leo Martínez		Main	Main
Danilo Carrera	Axel Vélez		Guest	Main
Jesús Neyra	Manuel "Manu" Copas			Main
Carlos Arrechea	Sebastián		Recurring	Recurring

- Isabella Castillo as Graciela "Grachi" Alonso – A new 16-year-old student at Escolarium, she is a very powerful witch who has inherited her powers from her late mother. At the beginning of season one, she moves to a new neighborhood with her father Francisco, who is the new math professor at Escolarium. Her best friend is Mecha, while she is in love with Daniel. During the second season, Grachi gets a new enemy named Mía, a witch who is determined to steal Daniel's love from her. At the end of the second season, Grachi's powers get stronger, enough to defeat Mía. During the third season, she has a new love interest who is also her enemy, Axel. She is the Latin counterpart of Emma Alonso from Every Witch Way.
- Andrés Mercado as Daniel Esquivel – The leader of the swimming team "The Sharks" at Escolarium. He's Chema's cousin and best friend. Daniel's parents are Cristina and Ricardo, and he has three siblings: Melanie, Luis and Roberto. He's introduced as Matilda's boyfriend and the most popular boy in the school, who every girl wants to be with. He and Grachi start a relationship during the first season's last episodes. In season two, he and Leo become enemies, because both want to be with Grachi. During the third season, Daniel befriends Leo, as he faces a new enemy, Axel. He is the Latin counterpart of Daniel Miller from Every Witch Way.
- Kimberly Dos Ramos as Matilda Román (Seasons 1–2) – She's the main antagonist of the first season and was the most popular girl at Escolarium before Grachi's arrival. She is also a witch but uses her powers to do bad. She is the leader of the "Red Panthers", a group of girls who dance and respond to all of Matilda's manipulations. Matilda is Daniel's ex-girlfriend, and she is determined to win his love back and destroy Grachi. During the second season, she began dating a new guy named Diego. She and Grachi developed a slight friendship during the season and became stepsisters at the end due to Ursula and Francisco's wedding. Matilda doesn't return for the third season. She is the Latin counterpart of Maddie Van Pelt from Every Witch Way.
- Rafael de la Fuente as Diego Forlán – Part of "The Sharks", Matilda's boyfriend in season two and a Kanay, a person who can manipulate the four elements. He was a minor character during the first season and got a prominent role during the following ones. In the third season, he falls in love with Axel's sister, Amaya, and she becomes his girlfriend at the end of the third season. He is the Latin counterpart of Diego Rueda from Every Witch Way.
- Mauricio Henao as Antonio "Tony" Gordillo – A highly intelligent and nerdy boy who falls in love with Grachi, but his affections aren't reciprocated. He joins the swimming team "The Sharks". At the end of the first season, Tony wins a scholarship to study at a better school and leaves Escolarium in search of new opportunities. He returns for the second and third season as a guest star, revealing he's a wizard. During the second season, he doesn't wear his glasses anymore, and has a more mature look. During the third season, he becomes an antagonist, trying to destroy Grachi for not loving him back, but he is locked up in a magical powder box by Axel. He is the Latin counterpart of Tony Myers from Every Witch Way.
- Sol Rodríguez as Mercedes "Mecha" Estevez – Grachi's best friend, daughter of Lolo. She hates Matilda, but is stuck living in the same house as her because Lolo works for Ursula, Matilda's mother. Mecha is in love with Chema. In season 2, she moves out of Matilda's mansion with her mother. She also dislikes Mía but becomes her guardian after finding out that the evil witches are the ones who have guardians, while the good witches only have magical tutors to guide them. In the third season, she falls in love with Manú. She is the Latin counterpart of Andi Cruz from Every Witch Way.
- Lance Dos Ramos as José María "Chema" Esquivel (Seasons 1–2) – Daniel's cousin and best friend, part of "The Sharks". Chema's parents are artists who tour most of the time, so Chema lives with his uncle Ricardo and aunt Cristina and his four cousins. He is in love with Mecha. He doesn't appear in the third season.
- Maria Gabriela de Faría as Mía Novoa (Seasons 2–3) – The new witch at Escolarium and Grachi's enemy in the second season. She falls in love with Daniel right away, but her love is not reciprocated. In the last episode of the second season, she tries to destroy Grachi's father and Matilda's mother wedding for revenge. She is later enchanted and loses her memory. During season three, she takes her memory back and tries to take revenge, but in the end she befriends Grachi. She is the Latin counterpart of Mia Black from Every Witch Way.
- Willy Martin as Leonardo "Leo" Martinez (Seasons 2–3) – An intelligent and creative guy who uses science to create his own magic. He has a crush on Grachi and hates Daniel. During the third season, he befriends Daniel and starts a relationship with his best friend Valeria.
- Danilo Carrera as Axel Vélez (Seasons 2–3) – A wizard at the school of witchcraft, he is Amaya's brother, Erick's son and Mía's ex-boyfriend. He's the villain of the third season and uses his power to do misdeeds. He is sent to the past in the season's last episode by Daniel through the collar. He is the Latin counterpart of Jax Novoa from Every Witch Way.
- Jesús Neyra as Manú (Season 3) – used to be Axel's best friend and sidekick. He falls in love with Mecha, and later becomes part of the heroes and Mecha's boyfriend. He is the Latin counterpart of Luke Archer.
- Katie Barberi as Úrsula – Matilda's mother and Francisco's wife. She accidentally obtained Matilda's powers during the final episode of the first season and the first ones of the second one. She gets closer to Grachi and Francisco during the second season. She marries Francisco at the end of the season. Note: Barberi also played Ursula (Maddie Van Pelt's mom) in Every Witch Way.
- Ramiro Fumazoni as Francisco Alonso – Grachi's father and, later, new principal of the Escolarium and Úrsula's husband.
- Sharlene Taulé as Katty – Co-leader of the "Red Panthers" and Matilda's sidekick. Dotty and Betty's best friend. She is the Latin counterpart of Katie Rice from Every Witch Way.
- María del Pilar Pérez (Pitizion) as Dotty – Member of the "Red Panthers" and Matilda's sidekick. Katty and Betty's. She is the Latin counterpart of Sophie Johnson from Every Witch Way.
- Carlo Arrechea as Sebastian (Seasons 1–3) – Member of "The Sharks", the popular swimming team from Escolarium. He's funny and likes to be the center of attention, burps all the time specially on season 3. His nickname is "El Tiburón Peligroso" (The dangerous shark). He always wants to be the best. His best friend is Carlos. He is intelligent, naive and a good athlete.
- Alexandra Pomales as Betty (Season 1) – Member of the "Red Panthers" and Matilda's sidekick. Betty transfers to a different school during the first season.
- Cristian Campocasso as Luis Esquivel – Daniel's younger brother. He is the Latin counterpart of Tommy Miller.
- Evaluna Montaner as Melanie Esquivel (Seasons 1–2) – Daniel's younger sister. Like her brothers, she likes Grachi and wants her to be Daniel's girlfriend. She is the Latin counterpart of Melanie Miller
- Andrés Cotrino as Roberto Esquivel (Seasons 1–2) – Daniel's younger brother. He is the Latin counterpart of Robert Miller.
- Liannet Borrego as Cussy Canosa (Season 1) – Julio's girlfriend, secretary in Escolarium and Grachi's magic tutor. She is the Latin counterpart of Lily from Every Witch Way.
- Lino Martone as Julio Vallas (Season 1) – Cussy's boyfriend, and the son of the Principal. He used to be "The Sharks" team coach, but later resigned during the second season. He has the same name as his American counterpart.

=== Recurring ===
- Marisela González as Lolo (Seasons 1–2) – Mecha's mother and Úrsula's personal assistant only in season one. In season two, she leaves Úrsula's house and goes to an apartment with her daughter Mecha. She was the guardian of Ora.
- William Valdés as Sibilo/Ora Santisteban (Season 1) – Lolo's ring, former wizard and Oracle.
- Adriana Cataño as Cristina de Esquivel (Seasons 1–2) – Daniel's mother.
- Manuel Carrillo as Ricardo Esquivel – Daniel's father. He is the Latin counterpart of Rick Miller
- Virginia Nuñez as Kim Kanay(Seasons 2–3) – Diego's friend and a Kanay.
- Martha Pabón as Mrs. Director (Season 1) – Principal of Escolarium and main antagonist in season one.
- Nicole Apollonio as Diana (Season 1–2) – Friend of Melanie and Guillermo's sister.
- Raquel Rojas as Rosa Forlán – Leader of the pink gossips, Diego's sister and also Guillermo's girlfriend during the second and third season. She is the Latin counterpart of Gigi Rueda.
- Wendy Regalado as Lucía – Member of the pink gossips. She is in love with Tony.
- Erika Navarro as Veronica (Season 1) – Member of the pink gossips.
- Andreina Santander as Marta (Season 1) – Member of the pink gossips.
- Elizabeth Lazo as Carolina (Season 1) – Member of the pink gossips.
- Angela Rincon as Silvia – Member of the pink gossips.
- Ana Carolina Grajales as Valeria (Seasons 2–3) – Member of the pink gossips. Leo's assistant and girlfriend in season three. She's Amaya's clone.
- Ana Carolina Grajales as Amaya Vélez (Season 3) – A new witch in the third season. Axel's sister, Mía's best friend, she falls in love with Diego, who is a Kanay and currently is her boyfriend at the end of the third season. She is the Latin counterpart of Jessie Novoa from Every Witch Way
- Guilherme Apollonio as Guillermo – Member of "The Sharks". He had a crush on Grachi only in the first season. Diego's best friend and Rosa's boyfriend during the second and third season. He is the Latin counterpart of Mac Davis from Every Witch Way.
- Tony Hernandez as Carlos – Member of "The Sharks".
- Jesus Licciardello as Eduardo (Season 1) – Dotty's lizard which was temporarily turned human by Matilda. He is the Latin counterpart of Beau.
- Alex Rosguer as Miguel (Season 1–2) – Leader of "The Dolphins" and Daniel's rival. He has a much bigger role during the second season, trying to take Grachi away from Daniel.
- Paloma Marquez as Isadora (Season 1) – Dance teacher at Escolarium.
- Yosvany Morales as Teacher of Chemistry (Season 1) – Teacher at Escolarium.
- Francisco Chacin as Fernando Gordillo – Tony's father and worker of the Cafeteria at Escolarium.
- Diana Osorio as Alejandra Forlán (Season 2) – She is the new coach of "The Sharks", and she is the sister of Diego and Rosa.
- Juan Pablo Llano as Ignacio "Nacho" Novoa (Season 2) – Mia's brother. He is the new coach of "The Dolphins" in season two and is in love with Alejandra.

== Episodes ==
Season	Episodes	Originally released	
Season	Episodes	First released	Last released
1	74	May 2, 2011	August 11, 2011
2	81	February 27, 2012	June 18, 2012
3	50	March 4, 2013	May 10, 2013

== TV specials ==
=== A Wonderfully Magical Story (2011) ===
It is the first special broadcast on TV of the series. It premiered on Thursday, April 28, 2011, and was re-aired days later on Monday, May 2, 2011, before season one's first episode. The main characters introduce themselves to the audience, talking about themselves, their friends, their neighborhood and their school. It was released on DVD under the title "Un Especial de Grachi" (A Grachi Special) on August 1, 2011, in Mexico and July 14, 2012, in Argentina. A limited edition of the DVD exists that includes a microphone as a gift. It was also broadcast in Italy, Spain, the Philippines, France and Poland.

=== Unaired Episode: Kanay (2011) ===
It is a lost episode showing deleted scenes from the series. It premiered months after the end of the first season, on August 19, 2011, on Nickelodeon. The episode focuses on the character Diego Forlán, the 'Churi Kanay' (elemental wizard) and his magical powers. It is the only episode in the entire series where the protagonist Isabella Castillo does not appear. On streaming services and on the DVD of Grachi's first season it is shown as the final episode '#75'.

=== I Want My Sweet 16: Matilda (2011) ===
It is a TV film focused on Matilda's sixteenth birthday, but it also reveals itself to be an undercover investigation by a journalist named Alejandro Carrión to prove the existence of witches. The film is a parody of the TV series My Super Sweet 16 and Quiero Mis Quinces from MTV, so Matilda is filmed by cameras during the planning of her birthday party. It premiered on August 25, 2011, on Nickelodeon Latin America and was released on DVD on November 11, 2011, in Mexico and July 14, 2012, in Argentina, a limited edition of the DVD was also released, including a microphone as a gift and a code for a 25% discount on other Grachi products and experiences. It was re-aired as part of a Halloween celebration on October 12, 2016, on Nickelodeon Latin America. It was also broadcast in Italy on the channel RaiGulp, and on Nickelodeon Portugal.

=== Grachi: On Tour in Colombia... Part I and II (2011) ===
These are two documentaries about the tour the series' cast did in Bogotá, Colombia, where "NickCity" reporters Stephania Duque and Tatiana Fernandez follow the cast from their arrival at the airport, through various autograph signings, and as they sing for their fans. It contains interviews with the characters and fans of the series. It premiered on December 3 and 7, 2011, respectively, during the NickCity block on the Colombian TV channel Citytv.

The Best of Grachi (2012)

It is a TV special that only aired in the Philippines at the end of the last episode of Grachi's first season, where the main cast of the series reunites and talks about their favorite moments from all the episodes. It premiered on April 27, 2012, dubbed into English on Nickelodeon Philippines.

=== Life is Wonderfully Musical (2012) ===
This TV film presents several musical acts performed by the main protagonists while they dance. The musicals presented are "Magia" (Magic), "La Estrella Soy Yo" (I Am the Star), "Somos Las Panteras" (We Are the Panthers), "Tiburones" (Sharks), "Amor de Película" (Movie Love), among others. This film premiered on the TV channel Nickelodeon Latin America on May 10, 2012, and was released on DVD on June 15, 2012. The DVD omits two musical numbers from the "Grachi: La Vida es Maravillosamente Mágica" album of the series, which are "¿Qué Sabes?" (What Do You Know?) and "Tú y Yo" (You and I), which were aired during its original premiere on Nickelodeon.

=== Nick at Home: Grachi Reunion (2020) ===
It is a special where Nickelodeon reunites the main cast from all seasons to celebrate the tenth anniversary of Grachi, which began production in 2010. It premiered on May 28, 2020, on the Instagram and Facebook profiles and the YouTube channel of Nickelodeon Latin America. It is hosted by the young influencer La Bala. The cast shares anecdotes from filming and international tours, plays games, sings, and talks about the possibility of a fourth season and a film.

Nick Playlist: Special 'Super Friends Edition' (2020)

It is a special where Mexican popstar Sofía Reyes, along with the cast of Grachi and other Latin Nickelodeon series such as Kally's Mashup, Club 57, and Yo Soy Franky, present several visual musicals during the lockdown due to the COVID-19 pandemic. In this special, the songs "Magia" (Magic), "Grachi", and "Amor de Película" (Movie Love) are presented.

== Reception ==
It is considered one of the 50 most talked about and cataloged series in Latin America, winning more than 47 awards. It also holds the record of being Latin American Nickelodeon's highest debut (in general) gaining 10.7 million viewers on its premiere in Mexico alone, surpassing the 6.8 million viewers that had the before record holder Big Time Rush. Season 2 of Grachi grew 4% more on ratings, gaining 11.1 million viewers on its first episode through Nickelodeon in Mexico.

== Music ==
=== La Vida es Maravillosamente Mágica ===
The soundtrack of the first season was released in Latin America on June 7, 2011. The album includes 14 songs used in the series sang mostly by Isabella Castillo, some others of the cast and Latin artists. The simple theme of the series was released on April 1, 2011, with its accompanying video. The second single from the album, Tu Eres Para Mi, was released on July 21, 2011. Distributed by Universal Music and Warner Music. A live concert tour was created to promote the album in North America, South America and Europe. The album peaked No. 1 in Mexico and achieved a triple diamond certification for one million physical copies sold in that country, it also gained a double platinum certification in Brazil for 80.000 copies sold.

Original release
No.	Title	Length
1.	"Grachi" (Isabella Castillo)	2:54
2.	"Goma de Mascar" (Paty Cantú)	2:58
3.	"¿Qué Sabes?" (Isabella Castillo)	3:40
4.	"Tú Eres Para Mí" (Isabella Castillo & Andrés Mercado)	4:07
5.	"Tú & Yo" (Elenco de Grachi)	3:44
6.	"Somos Aire" (Motel)	4:02
7.	"Lobo" (Koko)	3:43
8.	"Hechizo de Amor" (Ádammo)	3:24
9.	"Las Palabras" (Manuela Mejía)	3:20
10.	"Llega el Otoño" (Abril Cantilo)	2:42
11.	"Enamorada" (Miranda!)	3:15
12.	"Algún Día" (Ádammo)	3:12
13.	"Acabo de Llegar" (Denisse)	3:37

Re-issue – Bonus Track Edition
No.	Title	Length
14.	"Goma de Mascar (Hoodie's Club Mix)" (Paty Cantú)	3:54

Re-issue – Argentinian Edition Bonus Track
No.	Title	Length
15.	"Puedo Volar" (Agustín Almeyda)	3:24

Re-issue – iTunes Bonus Track
No.	Title	Length
17.	"¿Qué Sabes? (Tony Choy's Magia Dance Remix)" (Isabella Castillo)	3:48

=== La Vida es Maravillosamente Mágica, Vol. 2 ===
The second soundtrack was released on April 11, 2012, in Latin America and it contains the season 2 songs, this time all sang by the entire cast from the series. Distributed by Warner Music. A live concert tour was created to promote the album in North America, South America and Europe. The song "Lagrimas" won a Latin Grammy nomination. This album peaked No. 1 in 14 countries and won many diamond, platinum and gold certifications around the world. It has sold more than 3 million copies and its Nickelodeon Latin America's most sold and successful album ever released.

Original release
No.	Title	Length
1.	"Grachi (Remix)" (Isabella Castillo)	2:52
2.	"Magia" (Isabella Castillo, Kimberly Dos Ramos & María Gabriela de Faría)	2:35
3.	"Amor de Película" (Isabella Castillo & Andrés Mercado)	3:20
4.	"La Estrella Soy Yo" (María Gabriela de Faría)	3:07
5.	"Química Perfecta" (Willy Martin & Ana Carolina Grajales)	3:16
6.	"Tiburones" (Rafael de la Fuente, Lance Dos Ramos, Guilherme Apollonio, Carlos Arrechea & Yony Hernández)	1:52
7.	"Te Busco" (Rafael de la Fuente & Kimberly Dos Ramos)	3:59
8.	"Siempre, Siempre, Siempre" (María Gabriela de Faría)	3:08
9.	"Lágrimas (Acoustic)" (Isabella Castillo)	3:42
10.	"Somos Las Panteras" (Kimberly Dos Ramos, María del Pilar Pérez & Sharlene Taule)	2:50
11.	"M.A.P.S" (Isabella Castillo & Sol Rodríguez)	3:00
12.	"Lágrimas (Dance Remix)" (Isabella Castillo)	3:12
13.	"Soñar Forever" (Cristian Campocasso)	3:12
14.	"Tú Eres Para Mí (Rock Remix)" (Isabella Castillo & Andrés Mercado)	4:04

=== Soñar No Cuesta Nada ===
On March 21, 2013, Warner Music signed Nickelodeon Latin American star Isabella Castillo. The album Soñar No Cuesta Nada was released on Latin America on April 23, 2013, and it contains 4 songs from the third season of Grachi. Nickelodeon, MTV, MTV Hits & VH1 promoted the album. This album peaked No. 14 in the Billboard Latin Hot 100. It also contains a new version of the Latin Grammy nominated song from Grachi season 2 "Lágrimas".

== Tours ==
Due to the success of the series, the cast of Grachi embarked on multiple promotional and concert tours throughout Latin America, Europe, and the United States, offering autograph signings, meet & greets, theatrical plays, and showcases, as well as attending interviews on television programs, radio stations, and press conferences. The cast of Grachi also held multiple online meetings with their fans through video calls on social media platforms, such as X and Instagram. In 2025, Sol Rodríguez confirmed through her TikTok profile that an exclusive concert tour in Europe was also planned, but it did not take place due to lack of time. Finally in 2013 some members visited Venezuela, and in 2016 Isabella Castillo toured in Dominican Republic. In May 2020 the cast of Grachi confessed desires to tour again together and film a new season and a movie, while they were promoting the sixth rebroadcast and 10th anniversary of Grachi on Nickelodeon Latin America's TV channel.

=== Press Tours, Award attendances, CD & DVD signings, meet & greets and Philanthropy ===
Country	City	Event	Date
United States	Los Angeles	Kids' Choice Awards	March 31, 2012
United States	Los Angeles	Isabella Castillo hosting the orange carpet of the Kids' Choice Awards U.S.	March 12, 2016
United States	Los Angeles	TV interviews and press promo for the premiere of Grachi in the United States & Canada through Azteca America	May 6, 2014
United States	Miami	Filming of Grachi	January 10, 2011 - October 25, 2012
United States	Miami	Interview on Turn It On	May 14, 2012
United States	Miami	Interview on Cala CNN	March 27, 2012
United States	Miami	Meet & Greet and toy delivery to children with cancer at the Ronald McDonald House Charities hospital	May 19, 2013
Mexico	Mexico City	Press conference at Hotel W promoting the first CD, Grachi's merchandise line, the tour "Grachi el Show en Vivo" & season 2	June 8, 2011
Mexico	Mexico City	Private showcase at Hard Rock Cafe (with special guest Paty Cantú)	June 9, 2011
Mexico	Mexico City	CD signing at Plaza Satélite	June 10, 2011
Mexico	Mexico City	DVD signing at Mixup Plaza Loreto	December 1, 2011
Mexico	Mexico City	Autograph signing at Liverpool Perisur	December 2, 2011
Mexico	Mexico City	Autograph signing at Mixup Plaza Universidad	April 30, 2013
Mexico	Monterrey	Autograph signing at Saharis	July 15, 2013
Mexico	Mexico City	Autograph signing at Papalote Museo del Niño and meet & greet at Verano Nick	July 18, 2013
Mexico	Mexico City	Kids' Choice Awards Mexico	September 3, 2011
Mexico	Mexico City	Kids' Choice Awards Mexico	September 1, 2012
Mexico	Mexico City	Kids' Choice Awards Mexico	August 31, 2013
Mexico	Mexico City	Kids' Choice Awards Mexico	September 20, 2014
Mexico	Mexico City	Kids' Choice Awards Mexico	August 18, 2017
Mexico	Mexico City	Kids' Choice Awards Mexico	August 27, 2022
Colombia	Bogotá	Autograph signing at Montessori British School	November 17, 2011
Colombia	Bogotá	CD signing and showcase at Gran Estación Mall	November 18, 2011
Colombia	Bogotá	Press conference and meet & greet at CityTV studios	November 19, 2011
Colombia	Bogotá	Meet & Greet	November 20, 2011
Colombia	Bogotá	TV appearances, press promo and radio interviews	November 21, 2011
Colombia	Bogotá	TV appearances, press promo and radio interviews	November 22, 2011
Colombia	Bogotá	Kids' Choice Awards Colombia	September 10, 2016
Colombia	Bogotá	Kids' Choice Awards Colombia	September 30, 2017
Argentina	Buenos Aires	Meet & Greet, CD signing and showcase at the Nickelodeon & MTV Studios, shooting of TV commercials and livestream with fans via X	May 16, 2012
Argentina	Buenos Aires	TV appearances, press promo and radio interviews	May 18, 2012
Argentina	Buenos Aires	TV appearances, press promo and radio interviews	May 19, 2012
Argentina	Buenos Aires	Screening of the final episode of Grachi's season 3 and private concert for fans at Samsung Studio (with special guest Roger González)	May 10, 2013
Argentina	Rosario	CD signing at Portal Rosario (canceled due to a major gas explosion in Rosario that resulted in 22 fatalities and 60 injuries, the scheduled autograph signing event was canceled)	August 9, 2013
Argentina	Morón	CD signing at Musimundo Plaza Oeste	August 22, 2013
Argentina	Lomas de Zamora	CD signing at Musimundo Portal Lomas	August 23, 2013
Argentina	Buenos Aires	Kids' Choice Awards Argentina	October 5, 2012
Argentina	Buenos Aires	Kids' Choice Awards Argentina	October 18, 2013
Argentina	Buenos Aires	Kids' Choice Awards Argentina	October 19, 2017
Venezuela	Caracas	Radio interviews	February 20, 2013
Venezuela	Caracas	TV interviews & press conference	February 21, 2013
Venezuela	Caracas	TV interviews in various Televen TV shows	February 22, 2013
Venezuela	Caracas	Autograph signing at Sambil Caracas Shopping Center	February 23, 2013
Venezuela	Caracas	TV interviews and appearance on "Consentidos Estrellas" from Televen	September 7, 2013
Dominican Republic	Santo Domingo	Sharlene promotes her debut album on TV, radio and press	October 8, 2014
Dominican Republic	Santo Domingo	Isabella Castillo gets interviewed on Chévere Nights at Telesistema 11	May 4, 2016
Dominican Republic	Santo Domingo	"Celebrities Fashion Show" benefit concert. Isabella Castillo also donated the iconic pink leather jacket of her character Grachi to raise funds for the 'Aprendiendo a Vivir' and 'Un Paso a la Vez' foundations and modeled exclusive designs by Giannina Azar.	May 5, 2016
Dominican Republic	Santo Domingo	Isabella Castillo gets interviewed on Divertido con Jochy at Telesistema 11	May 8, 2016
Dominican Republic	Santo Domingo	Several radio and TV interviews	May 9, 2016
Dominican Republic	Santo Domingo	Several radio and TV interviews	May 10, 2016
Dominican Republic	Santo Domingo	Several radio and TV interviews	May 11, 2016
Ecuador	Salinas	Danilo Carrera started his own foundation, TWAM, to invite celebrities and Grachi fans to clean up dirty beaches, and he visited Ecuador to clean the beach and the boardwalk of Salinas	January 12, 2014
Nicaragua	Managua	Press conference and TV interviews	March 10, 2014
Nicaragua	Nueva Guinea	Delivery of laptops to underprivileged children at the Virgen del Carmen school in the South Caribbean Coast Autonomous Region	March 11, 2014
Nicaragua	Managua	Delivery of laptops to underprivileged children at the Santa Clara de Asís school	March 12, 2014
Nicaragua	Chinandega	Delivery of laptops to underprivileged children at the Aquespalapa school	March 14, 2014
Honduras	San Pedro Sula	Danilo Carrera played soccer alongside other celebrities in an event called RotaGol to raise funds for two important causes: the Amor y Vida Foundation, an institution that houses 34 orphaned children living with HIV, providing them with medication, education, and vocational training; and the construction of the Casa de la Cultura	January 17, 2014
Italy	Rome	Autograph signings, showcases, meet & greets, press conferences & interviews at many Rai Gulp, Rai 2 & Sky TG24 TV shows like TG2, GT Ragazzi, Storie di Ragazzi, and more.	April 14, 2012
Italy	Rome	Autograph signings, showcases, meet & greets, press conferences & interviews at many Rai Gulp, Rai 2 & Sky TG24 TV shows like TG2, GT Ragazzi, Storie di Ragazzi, and more.	April 15, 2012
Italy	Rome	Autograph signings, showcases, meet & greets, press conferences & interviews at many Rai Gulp, Rai 2 & Sky TG24 TV shows like TG2, GT Ragazzi, Storie di Ragazzi, and more.	April 16, 2012
Italy	Florence	Autograph signings, showcases, meet & greets, press conferences and shooting of Nickelodeon Italy and Rai Gulp TV ads	April 18, 2012
Italy	Venice	Autograph signings, showcases, meet & greets, press conferences and shooting of Nickelodeon Italy and Rai Gulp TV ads	April 19, 2012
Italy	Milan	Autograph signings, showcases, meet & greets, press conferences and shooting of Nickelodeon Italy and Rai Gulp TV ads	April 20, 2012
Italy	Positano	Autograph signings, showcases, meet & greets, press conferences and shooting of Nickelodeon Italy and Rai Gulp TV ads	April 21, 2012
Italy	Positano	Autograph signings, showcases, meet & greets, press conferences and shooting of Nickelodeon Italy and Rai Gulp TV ads	April 22, 2012
Italy	Positano	Autograph signings, showcases, meet & greets, press conferences and shooting of Nickelodeon Italy and Rai Gulp TV ads	April 23, 2012
Italy	Rome	Autograph signings, showcases, meet & greets, press conferences and shooting of Nickelodeon Italy and Rai Gulp TV ads	April 24, 2012
Italy	Rome	Autograph signings, showcases, meet & greets, press conferences and shooting of Nickelodeon Italy and Rai Gulp TV ads	April 25, 2012
Italy	Rome	Autograph signings, showcases, meet & greets, press conferences and shooting of Nickelodeon Italy and Rai Gulp TV ads	April 26, 2012
Italy	Rome	Autograph signings, showcases, meet & greets, press conferences and shooting of Nickelodeon Italy and Rai Gulp TV ads	April 27, 2012
Italy	Tuscania	Cast vacations	April 28, 2012
Italy	Tuscania	Cast vacations	April 29, 2012
Italy	Tuscania	Cast vacations	April 30, 2012
Italy	Tuscania	Cast vacations	May 1, 2012
Italy	Tuscania	Cast vacations	May 2, 2012
Brazil	São Paulo	CD signing with Victoria Justice at Villa-Lobos Mall Shopping and TV & radio interviews	October 3, 2012
Brazil	São Paulo	Kids' Choice Awards Brazil	October 4, 2012
Brazil	São Paulo	Kids' Choice Awards Brazil	October 17, 2013

== Grachi: El Show en Vivo (2012) ==
On June 8, 2011, Nickelodeon head executives announced a tour of theatrical plays of Grachi while on a press conference at Hotel W in Mexico City. The tickets for the live show started being sold on December 19, 2011 The show's setlist contains all the songs from Grachi's first soundtrack album, and also (then) new songs from the Season 2 and a couple exclusive songs which only appeared on the live show. VIP packages were sold, with these the fans could take a photo with Isabella Castillo, Andrés Mercado and María Gabriela de Faría by the end of the show.

The first live show opened at Teatro Metropolitan in Mexico City on February 10, 2012. The show received mixed reviews, generally positive, but some people did not like the use of playback by some members of the cast.

Fans could also get merchandise of Grachi at the theaters and auditoriums where the live show was presented.

Country	City	Venue	Shows per day	Date	Attendance
Mexico	Mexico City	Teatro Metropólitan	1	February 10, 2012	3,165/3,165
Mexico	Mexico City	Teatro Metropólitan	2	February 12, 2012	6,330/6,330
Mexico	Guadalajara	Teatro Galerías	2	February 25, 2012	3,610/3,610
Mexico	Guadalajara	Teatro Galerías	2	February 26, 2012	3,610/3,610
Mexico	Puebla	Auditorio del Complejo Cultural Universitario (CCU) de la BUAP	2	March 18, 2012	7,280/7,280
Mexico	Mexico City	Teatro Metropólitan	2	March 24, 2012	6,330/6,330
Mexico	Mexico City	Teatro Metropólitan	2	March 25, 2012	6,330/6,330
Argentina	Buenos Aires	Teatro Gran Rex	2	July 14, 2012	6,524/6,524
Argentina	Buenos Aires	Teatro Gran Rex	2	July 15, 2012	6,524/6,524
Argentina	Buenos Aires	Teatro Gran Rex	2	July 16, 2012	6,524/6,524
Argentina	Buenos Aires	Teatro Gran Rex	2	July 19, 2012	6,524/6,524
Argentina	Buenos Aires	Teatro Gran Rex	2	July 20, 2012	6,524/6,524
Argentina	Rosario	Teatro Astengo	1	July 21, 2012	1,100/1,100
Argentina	Santa Fe	Teatro ATE Casa España	1	July 22, 2012	950/950
Dominican Republic	Santo Domingo	Arena Banreservas Professor Virgilio Travieso Soto	2	March 16, 2013	16,674/16,674
					104,399/104,399 (100%)

== Awards and nominations ==
Year	Award	Category	Nominated/Receiver	Result
2011	Kids' Choice Awards México			
2011	Kids' Choice Awards México	Favorite Female Character in a Series	Isabella Castillo	Won
2011	Kids' Choice Awards México	Favorite Male Character in a Series	Andrés Mercado	Won
2011	Kids' Choice Awards México	Favorite Villain	Kimberly Dos Ramos	Nominated
2011	Kids' Choice Awards México	Favorite TV Program		Won
2011	Kids' Choice Awards Argentina			
2011	Kids' Choice Awards Argentina	Television Revelation	Isabella Castillo	Nominated
2011	Kids' Choice Awards Argentina	Favorite Villain	Kimberly Dos Ramos	Nominated
2011	Kids' Choice Awards Argentina	Favorite Latin Television Program		Nominated
2012	Kids' Choice Awards U.S.	Favorite Latin Artist	Isabella Castillo	Won
2012	Kids' Choice Awards México	Favorite Program		Nominated
2012	Kids' Choice Awards México	Favorite Actor	Andrés Mercado	Nominated
2012	Kids' Choice Awards México	Favorite Actress	Isabella Castillo	Nominated
2012	Kids' Choice Awards México	Favorite Actor in a Series	Rafael de la Fuente	Nominated
2012	Kids' Choice Awards México	Favorite Actor in a Series	Mauricio Henao	Nominated
2012	Kids' Choice Awards México	Favorite Actress in a Series	Sol Rodriguez	Nominated
2012	Kids' Choice Awards México	Favorite Villain	Kimberly Dos Ramos	Nominated
2012	Kids' Choice Awards México	Favorite Villain	Maria Gabriela de Faria	Nominated
2012	Meus Prêmios Nick	Favorite Actress	Isabella Castillo	Won
2012	Meus Prêmios Nick	Favorite TV Character	Isabella Castillo	Won
2012	Meus Prêmios Nick	Girl of the Year	Kimberly Dos Ramos	Nominated
2012	Meus Prêmios Nick	Favorite TV Program		Won
2012	Kids' Choice Awards Argentina	Favorite TV Program		Won
2012	Kids' Choice Awards Argentina	Favorite Actor	Andrés Mercado	Nominated
2012	Kids' Choice Awards Argentina	Favorite Actress	Isabella Castillo	Won
2012	Kids' Choice Awards Argentina	Favorite Villain	Kimberly Dos Ramos	Nominated
2012	Kids' Choice Awards Argentina	Favorite Villain	Maria Gabriela de Faria	Nominated
2012	Kids' Choice Awards Argentina	Revelation	Sol Rodriguez	Nominated
2012	GEMA Awards	Best Poster		Nominated
2013	Kids' Choice Awards U.S.	Favorite Latin Artist	Isabella Castillo	Won
2013	Kids' Choice Awards México	Favorite Series or TV Program		Nominated
2013	Kids' Choice Awards México	Favorite Actor	Andrés Mercado	Nominated
2013	Kids' Choice Awards México	Favorite Actress	Isabella Castillo	Nominated
2013	Kids' Choice Awards México	Favorite Actress in a Series	Ana Carolina Grajales	Nominated
2013	Kids' Choice Awards México	Favorite Villain	María Gabriela de Faría	Won
2013	Meus Prêmios Nick	Favorite Actor	Andrés Mercado	Nominated
2013	Meus Prêmios Nick	Boy of the Year	Danilo Carrera	Won
2013	Kids' Choice Awards Argentina	Favorite Actress	Sol Rodriguez	Nominated
2013	Kids' Choice Awards Argentina	Favorite Actor	Andrés Mercado	Nominated
2013	Kids' Choice Awards Argentina	Favorite Villain	María Gabriela de Faría	Nominated
2013	Kids' Choice Awards Argentina	Favorite Villain	Danilo Carrera	Nominated
2013	Kids' Choice Awards Argentina	Favorite TV Program		Nominated
2013	EXA Frost Awards Mexico	Contribution to Music	Isabella Castillo	Won
2013	Teen TV Awards Russia	TV Program of the Year		Won
2013	Radio TKM Awards Argentina	Favorite TV Program		Nominated
2013	Radio TKM Awards Argentina	Favorite Villain	Kimberly Dos Ramos	Nominated
2013	Radio TKM Awards Argentina	Favorite Villain	María Gabriela de Faría	Nominated
2013	Radio TKM Awards Argentina	Boy of the Year	Andrés Mercado	Nominated
2013	Radio TKM Awards Argentina	Boy of the Year	Danilo Carrera	Nominated
2013	Radio TKM Awards Argentina	Favorite Song (Esta Canción)	Isabella Castillo	Nominated
2013	Radio TKM Awards Argentina	Favorite Album (Soñar No Cuesta Nada)	Isabella Castillo	Nominated
2013	Radio TKM Awards Argentina	Favorite Female Singer	Isabella Castillo	Nominated

== Adaptation ==
In 2014 after Grachi's international success, Nickelodeon United States decided to produce a remake. It was remade as Every Witch Way and it gained 4 seasons which were broadcast around the world too. And in 2015 Nickelodeon produced a spin-off of Grachi & Every Witch Way called W.I.T.S Academy, both, the remake and the spin-off were co-produced between Nickelodeon U.S. & Nickelodeon Latin America and recorded at the same studios where Grachi was filmed, both were premiered on every Nickelodeon channel through the world, just as Grachi did (but in the U.S.).

== Distribution ==
In the United States it premiered on February 3, 2014, on Azteca América.
