= Raquel Rojas =

Venezuelan actress and entertainer (born 1994)

- Born: Raquel Rojas; 24 May 1987 (age 38); Mérida, Venezuela
- Occupation: Actress
- Years active: 2010-present

Raquel Rojas (born May 24, 1987) is a Venezuelan actress recognized for her role in Grachi and The Exorcism of God.

== Early life and education ==
Raquel Rojas was born in Mérida, Venezuela. She performed at the age of 6 at a community theatre in Los Salias, San Antonio de los Altos, in Miranda. She moved to Caracas and continued performing. She completed her degree in Social Communication at the Andrés Bello Catholic University and then moved to Miami, Florida, where she obtained a Bachelor of Performing Arts and Film from the University of Miami.

Rojas speaks four languages: Spanish, English, Italian, and French. She has been under the tutelage of teachers of the dramatic art that include Noel de La Cruz, Julio César Mármol, and Karl Hoffman, among others. Rojas was mentioned in media as having a "fresh and attractive image.” The newspaper Avance commented that "[she] has become synonymous with beauty and talent in distant lands."

== Career ==
In 2010, after graduating from university, Rojas had small but well-received roles in the telenovelas Perro Amor, El Fantasma de Elena and Alguien te Mira, all on Telemundo in the United States. In 2011, she got the role of Rosa in the teen telenovela Grachi. It premiered in Latin America on May 2, 2011. Grachi was renewed for two more seasons, airing until 2013.

== Filmography ==
Television
Year	Title	Role	Notes
2010	Perro Amor	Journalist	Guest star
2010	El Fantasma de Elena	Nurse	Guest star
2010	Alguien te Mira	Mary Suárez	Recurring character
2011—2013	Grachi	Rosa Forlán	Secondary cast
2019	Rough Draft	Lindsey	Guest star
2022	Groad	Isabella Perez	Guest star

Film
Year	Title	Role
2021	The Exorcism of God	Inmate Silvia
In Production	The Blackstone	Clara
