= Ramiro Fumazoni =

Argentine model and actor

- Born: Osvaldo Ramiro Fumazoni; December 22, 1971 (age 53); Buenos Aires, Argentina
- Occupation(s): Actor, model
- Years active: 2009–present
- Children: 2

Osvaldo Ramiro Fumazoni, better known as Ramiro Fumazoni (born 22 December 1971), is an Argentine model and actor born in Buenos Aires, Argentina.

== Filmography ==
=== Film ===
Year	Title	Role	Notes
2012	El arribo de Conrado Sierra	Padre jacinto	

=== Television roles ===
Year	Title	Role	Notes
2009	Vuélveme a querer	Julio Peña	
2011	Charlie's Angels	Santos	Episode: "Angels in Chains"
2011–2013	Grachi	Francisco Alonso	190 episodes
2012	La ruta blanca	Joe Laviña	
2013	Solamente vos	Iván	13 episodes
2013	Vivir a destiempo	Alejandro Monroy	
2015	UEPA! Un escenario para amar	Padre de Claudio	
2016	Noches con Platanito	Himself	Episode: "Ramiro Fumazoni/Ana Lucía Domínguez/Alma Cero/Greg Behrends/Emma Escalante/Pancho Barraza"
2016	Tres veces Ana	Mariano	112 episodes
2017	La doble vida de Estela Carrillo	Juez	2 episodes
2017	Me declaro culpable	Tiziano Castolo	
2020	The House of Flowers	Martín	
2022	Amor dividido	Fabricio Zepeda	Main cast
2022	Mujeres asesinas	Mario	Episode: "Llámame Paula"
