= Demente criminal =

- Also known as: Demente
- Genre: Telenovela
- Created by: Ibéyise Pacheco
- Developed by: Univisión; Venevision International; UniMás
- Written by: Rosa Clemente; Raúl Prieto; Andrés Spinova; Daniel Yepes
- Directed by: Santiago Viteri; Otto Rodríguez; Abraham Pulido
- Starring: Lorena Rojas; Sebastian Ligarde; Gabriel Valenzuela; María Fernanda Yépez; Marcela Mar; Isabella Santodomingo
- Countries of origin: Venezuela; Colombia; United States
- Original languages: Spanish, English
- No. of episodes: 52

Production
- Executive producer: Juan Carlos Sosa
- Production locations: Miami, Florida, United States

Original release
- Network: Univisión Puerto Rico; Venevisión
- Release: April 1 – August 15, 2015

Demente criminal (lit. 'Criminal Mastermind' Spanish pronunciation: [d̪eˈmẽn̪.t̪e kɾi.miˈnal]) is a television series produced by Venevisión and Univisión. The series is based on the crime novel titled Sangre en el Diván written by Ibéyise Pacheco and is adapted by Rosa Clemente y Raul Prieto. The series is based on the life of Edmundo Chirinos.

Sebastián Ligarde and Lorena Rojas star as the main protagonists.

Univision Puerto Rico began airing Demente Criminal from April 1, 2015 at 10:00 PM. Venevisión began transmitting the series under the title Demente from June 16, 2015 at 11:00 PM.

== Cast ==
=== Main cast ===
- Lorena Rojas as Verónica García
- Sebastián Ligarde as Raimundo Acosta
- Gabriel Valenzuela as Julio Villalobos
- María Fernanda Yepes as Gabriela Fons
- Marcela Mar as Laura Montesinos
- Isabella Santodomingo as Consuelo de Morand

=== Supporting cast ===
- Carlos Mata as Gastón Quiroz
- Carlos Yustis as Gastón Quiroz
- Roberto San Martín as Gerardo Pinzón
- Alberto Mateo
- Mauricio Rentería
- Teresa Maria Rojas
- Gilda Haddock as Henrika
- Natasha Domínguez as Marcela Celaya
- Sol Rodríguez as Fernanda Sánchez
- Lance Dos Ramos as Anthony
- Carolina Ayala as Marisol
- Andrea Nuñez as Eliana
- Ana Osorio as Samantha
- Kevin Aponte as Juan Pedro
- Luke Grande as Sarampión
- Deive Garcés as René
- Germán Barrios as Miguel
- Pedro Telémaco as Ruiz

=== Extended cast ===
- Enrique Alejandro as Billy
- Joemy Blanco as Sofía Sánchez
- Joey Montana as Reo
- Javier Valcárcel
- Eduardo Serrano
- Crisol Carabal

=== Special participation ===
- Thamara Aguilar as Alicia Celaya
- Fernando Carrera as Raúl Morand
- Rolando Tarajano as Ezequiel Posada
- Ana Lorena Sánchez as Carla
- Plutarco Haza as Camilo
- Alejandro D' Carlo as Doctor Alirio
