= I Am Frankie =

American television series

- Genre: Drama
- Based on: Yo soy Franky by Marcela Citterio
- Starring: Alex Hook; Uriel Baldesco; Armani Barrett; Kristi Beckett; Kyson Facer; Sophia Forest; Mohana Krishnan; Jayce Mroz; Nicole Alyse Nelson; Carson Rowland; J.D. Ballard; Todd Allen Durken; Joy Kigin; Michael Laurino; Carrie Schroeder; Amina Alzouma; Zachary S. Williams; Tommi Rose; Jayme Lake; Ashton Heathcoat
- Voices of: Mark Jacobson
- Opening theme: "Getting Real" by Matthew Tishler and Jeannie Lurie
- Country of origin: United States
- Original language: English
- No. of seasons: 2
- No. of episodes: 40 (list of episodes)

Production
- Executive producers: Eric Gaunaurd; Tatiana Rodríguez
- Producer: Danny Mendoza
- Cinematography: Randy Valdés
- Camera setup: Single-camera
- Running time: 22 minutes
- Production companies: Paradiso Pictures; Nickelodeon Productions

Original release
- Network: Nickelodeon
- Release: September 4, 2017 – October 4, 2018

I Am Frankie is an American drama television series based on a story created by Marcela Citterio that aired on Nickelodeon from September 4, 2017 to October 4, 2018. Based on Yo soy Franky, the series focuses on Alex Hook in the titular role of Frankie Gaines, an android who is attempting to pass herself off as a normal teenage girl.

== Plot ==
Sigourney is a scientist working for the company EGG (Electronic Giga Genetics), who has developed a teenage android girl named Frankie. When the head of EGG, Mr. Kingston, plans to use Frankie for the military company WARPA (Weaponized Android Research Project Agency) for Project Q, Sigourney quits her job, smuggles Frankie out of EGG, and moves her family as far away from EGG as possible so that Frankie can live a normal life. As Frankie adapts to a normal life as a high school student at Sepulveda High, she befriends a girl named Dayton and gains a rival named Tammy. While she and her family work to keep her secret safe so that EGG does not find her, Mr. Kingston is determined to do whatever it takes to locate Frankie. Unbeknownst to Mr. Kingston, he is not the only one after her. In the second season, Frankie works to rescue Andrew from WARPA. Afterwards, WARPA still make their plans for the androids with Project Q in order to take control of the world.

== Episodes ==
Season	Episodes	Originally released	
Season	Episodes	First released	Last released
1	19	September 11, 2017	October 6, 2017
2	21	August 11, 2018	October 4, 2018

== Cast and characters ==
=== Main ===
- Alex Hook as Frankie, an android girl who was created by Sigourney who used to work for EGG and seeks to become a real human. Alex Hook also portrays Eliza, who first appears in "I Am... a Sitting Duck" as an android girl and prototype version of Frankie with a dangerous agenda.
- Uriel Baldesco as Lucia, a follower of Tammy and a member of Sepulveda High's Brain Squad.
- Armani Barrett as Byron (season 1), a member of Sepulveda High's Brain Squad who is into robotics.
- Kristi Beckett as Makayla, a follower of Tammy and a member of Sepulveda High's Brain Squad.
- Kyson Facer as Andrew, a student at Sepulveda High who is one of Frankie and Tammy's love interests. He is later revealed to be an android created by James.
- Sophia Forest as Jenny Gaines, the daughter of Sigourney who gets Frankie as an older sister.
- Mohana Krishnan as Tammy, a girl and leader of Sepulveda High's Brain Squad who becomes Frankie's rival and seeks to find the truth about her.
- Jayce Mroz as Robbie (season 1), an intelligent student who follows Frankie and Dayton around.
- Nicole Alyse Nelson as Dayton Reyes, a girl who becomes Frankie's best friend and one of the few people to know the truth about Frankie.
- Carson Rowland as Cole Reyes, the brother of Dayton who is one of Frankie's love interests.
- J.D. Ballard / Jim Ballard as Mr. Kingston, the head of EGG who seeks to reclaim Frankie to be used in WARPA's Project Q. In "I Am... Bound for Glory", he is later revealed to be Dayton and Cole's father Tom operating under an alias. In the first season, Mr. Kingston's first name is Gilford; in "I Am... Eliza", his first name is changed to Clarence.
- Todd Allen Durkin as James Peters, a former EGG scientist who used to work with Sigourney and wants to destroy Frankie.
- Joy Kigin as Ms. Hough, the principal of Sepulveda High.
- Michael Laurino as Will Gaines, the father of Jenny and husband of Sigourney who gains Frankie as a daughter.
- Carrie Schroeder as Sigourney Gaines, a former EGG scientist who built Frankie.
- Mark Jacobson as Voice of "PEGS1" (season 1), a small floating egg-shaped robot that works for Mr. Kingston.
- Amina Alzouma as Rachel (season 2), a new student and computer expert at Sepulveda High.
- Zachary S. Williams as Zane (season 2), a new student at Sepulveda High.
- Tommi Rose as Simone (season 2), an android girl who was created by WARPA.
- Jayme Lake as Cynthia (season 2), a scientist who is an old friend of Sigourney. She is later revealed to be the head of WARPA with plans to have their androids and Human Robot Organisms (or H.R.O. for short) take over Earth.
- Ashton Heathcoat as Beto (season 2), Cynthia's android son.

=== Recurring ===
- Justin Jarzombek as John (season 1)
- Rachael Thompson as Engineer Anderson (season 1)
- David Kelley as WARPA Agent (season 1)
- J. Scott Browning as WARPA Tech (season 2)
- Tracy Wiu as Sr. WARPA Tech (season 2)
- Clayton Johnson / Clayton Royal Johnson as Dolph (season 2)
- Sean Patrick Dawson / Sean Dawson as Lundgren (season 2)

== Production ==
On January 20, 2016, Nickelodeon announced that it had green-lit I Am Frankie to series with its first season to contain 20 episodes. The series is the first global series to be produced at the new Viacom International Studio in Miami, Florida. The series was originally produced as Yo soy Franky, created by Argentinian writer Marcela Citterio, for Nickelodeon Latin America in Colombia. Catharina Ledeboer, who previously worked on Every Witch Way and Talia in the Kitchen, adapted the series into English for global audiences. It was stated that production of the series would begin sometime in 2016. The series officially debuted on September 11, 2017, after a special sneak peek of the premiere aired on September 4, 2017. The premiere episode was made available on Nickelodeon streaming platforms starting on August 21, 2017.

Nickelodeon renewed the series for a second season on November 13, 2017. Filming for the second season began in March 2018. The second season premiered on Nickelodeon with a special event on August 11, 2018; new episodes of the second season resumed on September 10, 2018. Additionally, Amina Alzouma, Tommi Rose, and Zachary S. Williams joined the series' main cast in the second season.

== Ratings ==
Viewership and ratings per season of I Am Frankie
Season	Episodes	First aired		Last aired		Avg. viewers (millions)
Season	Episodes	Date	Viewers (millions)	Date	Viewers (millions)	Avg. viewers (millions)
1	19	September 11, 2017	1.47	October 6, 2017	1.13	1.24
2	21	August 11, 2018	0.90	October 4, 2018	0.74	0.78
