= William Valdés =

Cuban actor

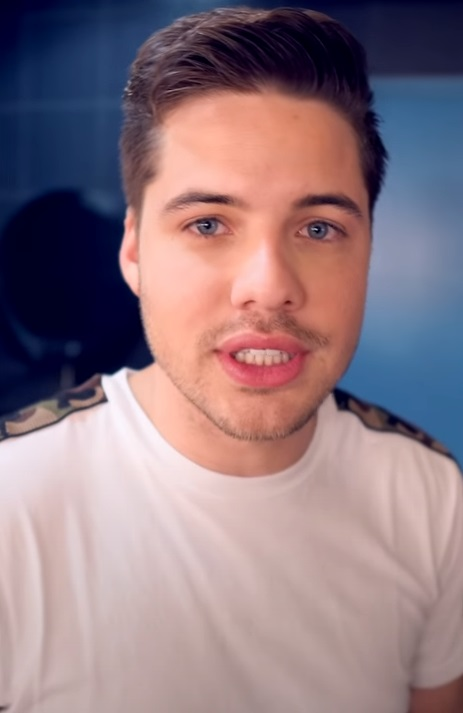
- Valdés in 2018
- Born: January 10, 1994 (age 31); Havana, Cuba
- Occupation(s): Actor, singer, TV host
- Years active: 2011-present

William Valdés López (born January 10, 1994, Havana, Cuba) is a Cuban actor, singer and TV host. He currently resides in Mexico City, Mexico.

== Career ==
At the age of 5, he attended the National Circus school in Havana. When he was 9, his family relocated to Miami, Florida. In his later teens, after attending acting school, Valdés appeared in the first season of the soap opera Grachi, where he portrayed Sibilo "Ora" Santisteban. In 2012, he played Miguel Ángel Samaniego in the soap opera El rostro de la venganza, co-starring with Kimberly Dos Ramos and María Gabriela de Faría (who worked with him on Grachi). In 2014, Valdés began filming the soap opera Voltea pa' que te enamores (2015), a new adaptation of the Venezuelan telenovela of the same name.

In May 2013, Valdés formed the Mexican boy band CD9 with Jos Canela, Alonso Villalpando, Alan Navarro, and Freddy Leyva. They independently released their first single, "The Party", in August 2013. They later signed a recording contract with Sony Music México. Valdés left the group in October of that year, citing "personal reasons", and was replaced by Bryan Mouque. He later revealed, in a 2016 interview, that he left the group not because of conflict with his members (as he said that he was on good terms with them) but because management promised him food and lodging in Mexico, yet was not able to provide this for him.

In May 2015, Valdés released "#MAS", his first single as a soloist.

Valdés appeared as a co-host on the Univision morning show ¡Despierta America! before his firing in 2017. He was also a co-host on the Estrella TV morning talkshow Buenos Días Familia but left the show in January 2019, before its cancellation in June that year.

== Filmography ==
Television
Year	Title	Role	Notes
2011	Grachi	Sibilo "Ora" Santisteban	74 episodes
2011	World Campaign in Support of Ibero-American Cinema	Himself	Video short
2012-13	El rostro de la venganza	Miguel Ángel Samaniego	Co-lead role
2012	Hablémonos	Himself	
2014-17	Despierta América	Himself	
2015	Voltea pa' que te enamores	Gerardo Ramos	Recurring role

Music videos
Year	Title	Role	Artist
2013	"Dime si tú"	Chico en la fiesta	Estephy featuring Chino y Nacho
2016	"Deja que hablen"/"Let Them Talk"	Himself	Giselle Torres featuring William Valdés
2018	"Winnie"	Himself	Ariel de Cuba (DKB) featuring William Valdés
