= CD9 (band) =

Mexican boy band

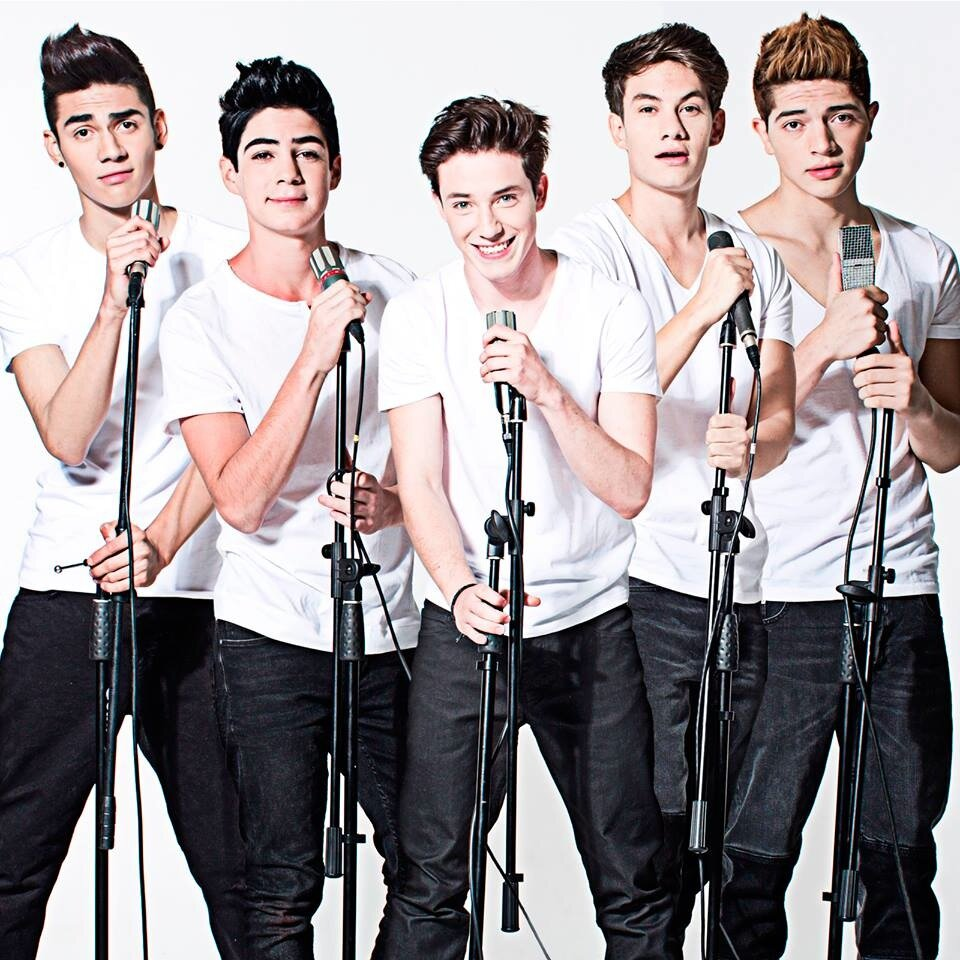
- CD9 during a photoshoot in 2014. From left to right: Alan Navarro, Jos Canela (former member), Alonso Villalpando, Bryan Mouque and Freddy Leyva.

Background information
- Origin: Mexico City, Mexico
- Genre: Latin pop
- Years active: 2013–present
- Label: Universal Music México
- Members: Alan Navarro; Alonso Villalpando; Jos Canela
- Past members: Bryan Mouque; Freddy Leyva; William Valdés

CD9 is a Mexican boy band formed in 2013. The original line-up consisted of William Valdés, Freddy Leyva, Alan Navarro, Jos Canela, and Alonso Villalpando. William Valdés left the group in October 2013 and was replaced by Bryan Mouque, whereas Jos Canela worked as the group's leader until his departure in May 2019.

Their training was given in 2013, in Mexico City. The members came up with the name because they claim that the term—which is an acronym for "Code 9"—is used to change the topic of conversation and that reflects who they are.

== Career ==
In August 2013, they independently published "The Party", and it quickly managed to draw the attention of the record company Sony Music México with whom they signed a recording contract. Then William Valdés, due to problems with management, left the group and was replaced by Bryan Mouque.

In the first half of 2014, they released two EPs, which managed to position itself at the top of sales in their country of origin. Later, at the end of September of the same year, the label released their studio debut homonymous-named album and in a month it obtained a certification of gold by AMPROFON after overcoming 30,000 copies sold. To promote their album, they carried out The Party Tour concert tour in Latin America.

In the first two months of 2015, they released their rebounded debut album: CD9: Love & Live Edition which includes live material from their tour. Of their first record productions seal they have released four singles: "The Party", "Ángel Cruel", "Me Equivoqué" and "Eres"; then they later appeared in the charts as Top Latin Songs of Latin Monitor as one of the most played songs.

In 2016, they performed the theme song for the film Teenage Mutant Ninja Turtles: Out of the Shadows. The song was an updated version of the theme song for the original cartoon TV show. They later collaborated with K-pop girl group Crayon Pop for a single titled "Get Dumb", releasing both an English version and a Spanish/Korean version.

In May 2019, amidst rumors of him leaving the group after he was frequently absent from concerts, Jos Canela released a statement on Twitter confirming his departure from CD9 after six years with the group.

The group has been inactive since the end of their Modo Avión tour which concluded on April 24, 2019, as well as the departure of Jos Canela.

On March 10, 2021, after almost two years of inactivity and the departure of members Jos Canela and Freddy Leyva, the band officially confirmed their separation through their Twitter account.

On April 6, 2024, the group's social media accounts were reactivated with a caption that describes: April 9. On April 9, 2024, they announce a unique show in Mexico City for July 19, due to the speed in which tickets were sold setting a national record, thus creating a tour with another 20 concerts added throughout Mexico until November 30.

== Band members ==
Former members

- William Valdés – lead vocals (2013)
- Jos Canela – lead vocals (2013–2019, 2024)
- Freddy Leyva – lead vocals (2013–2019. 2024-2026)
- Alonso Villalpando – lead vocals (2013–2021, 2024)
- Alan Navarro – lead vocals (2013–2021, 2024)
- Bryan Mouque – lead vocals (2013–2021, 2024-2026)

== Discography ==
=== Studio albums ===
List of studio albums, with selected details, chart positions, and certifications
Title	Album details	Peak chart positions		Certifications
Title	Album details	MEX	SPA	Certifications
CD9	Released: September 29, 2014; Label: Sony; Format: CD, digital download	1	86	AMPROFON: Gold + Platinum
Evolution	Released: March 18, 2016; Label: Sony; Format: CD, digital download	1	57	AMPROFON: Gold + Platinum
1.0	Released: March 23, 2018; Label: Sony; Format: CD, digital download	—	—	AMPROFON: Platinum
"—" denotes a recording that did not chart or was not released in that territory.

== Singles ==
List of singles as lead artist, with selected chart positions and certifications, showing year released and album name
Title	Year	Peak chart positions			Certifications	Album
Title	Year	MEX	MEX Esp.	MEX Pop	Certifications	Album
"The Party"	2013	—	—	—	AMPROFON: Gold	CD9
"Ángel Cruel"	2014	—	—	—	AMPROFON: Platinum+Gold	CD9
"Me Equivoqué"	2014	—	—	5		CD9
"Eres"	2014	—	—	5		CD9
"I Feel Alive"	2016	—	—	—		Evolution
"Déjà Vu"	2016	—	—	—		Evolution
"Best Bad Move"	2016	—	—	—		Evolution
"Get Dumb" (featuring Crayon Pop)	2016	18	—	—		Revolution
"A Tu Lado"	2017	—	30	—		Evolution
"No Le Hablen de Amor"	2017	7	3	9	AMPROFON: Platinum	.5 and 1.0
"Lío en la Cabeza"	2017	—	—	—	AMPROFON: Gold	.5 and 1.0
"Qué Le Importa a la Gente"	2017	—	—	—		.5 and 1.0
"Nadie Te Amará"	2017	—	—	—		.5 and 1.0
"Modo Avión"	2018	37	13	—		1.0
"Prohibido (Remix)" (featuring Lali and Ana Mena)	2018	—	—	16		1.0
"—" denotes a recording that did not chart or was not released in that territory.

== Concert tours ==
- The Party Tour (2014–15)
- The Party World Tour (2015–16)
- Evolution Tour (2016–17)
- Revolution Tour (2016–17)
- Modo Avión Tour (2018–19)
