= Sol Rodríguez =

Argentine actress and singer

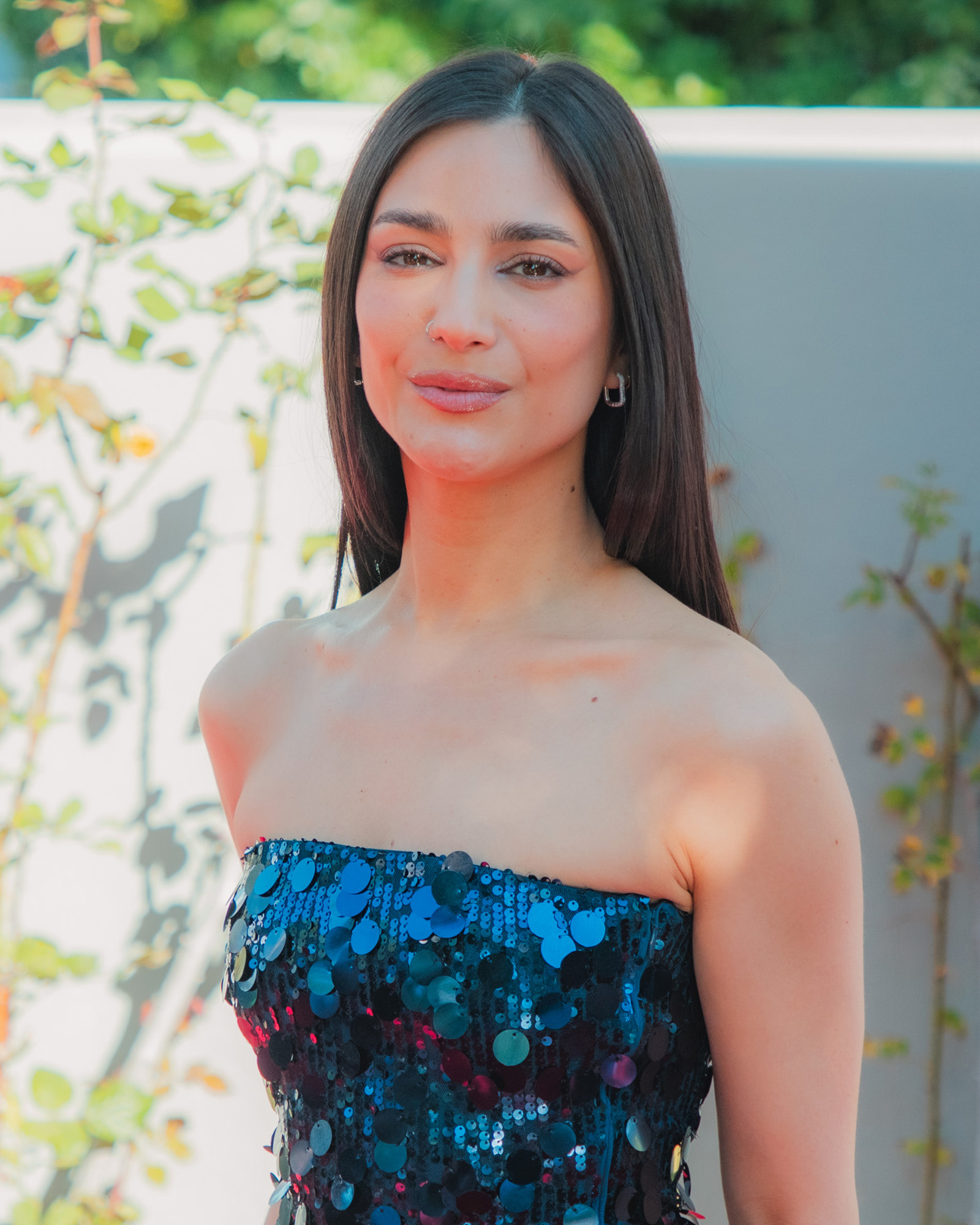
- Rodríguez in 2026
- Born: María Soledad Rodríguez Belli; Buenos Aires, Argentina
- Occupations: Actress, model, singer, dancer
- Years active: 2010–present

María Soledad Rodríguez Belli, known by her stage name Sol Rodríguez (Spanish pronunciation: [sol roˈðɾiɣes]), is an Argentine actress and model, known for playing Mecha in the Nickelodeon Latin America's series Grachi, as Teresa Ramirez in the second season of Star Trek: Picard, and as Sasha Bordeaux in the second season of Peacemaker.

== Early life ==
Born in Buenos Aires, Argentina, Sol Rodríguez is of Spanish and Italian descent. She started dancing when she was 5. At the age of 8 she moved with her family to Guatemala, where she continued dancing and singing. She was part of a girl group in school who performed in parent reunions and school activities, and she started doing TV commercials when she was ten. In 2006 she moved with her parents to Miami where she studied at Miami Dade College, but she then dropped out to sign up with a talent agency in Miami. Some weeks later she did her first print work for Reebok.

== Career ==
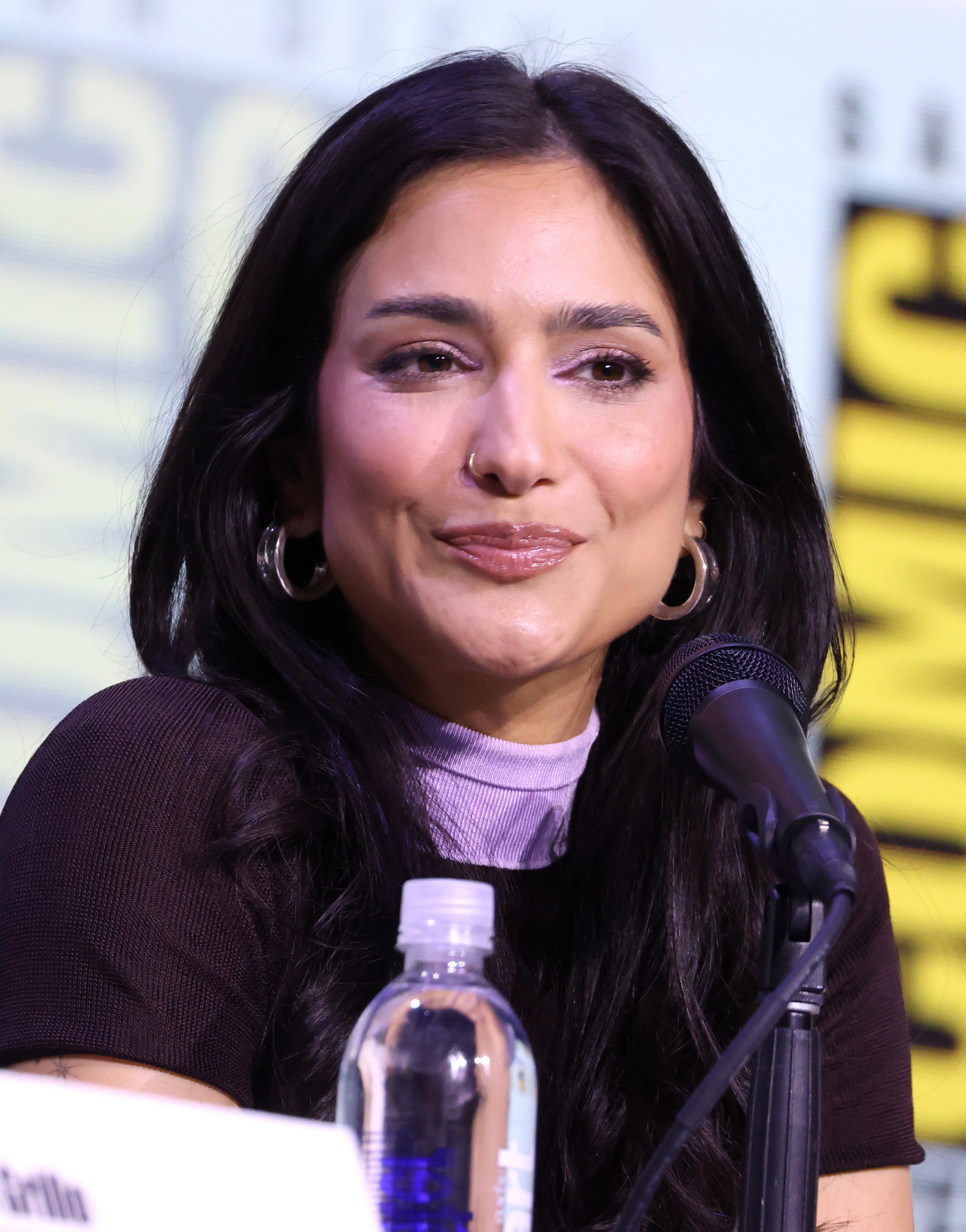
Rodríguez in 2025

Her first casting was for Nickelodeon Latin America, where she landed a co-starring role in the original production Grachi. Thanks to the response of the fans they did three seasons, being number one in ratings in many of Latin Americas countries. There was also a musical tour during the second season, Grachi: El Show en Vivo, that traveled to many Mexico cities. In Argentina they did 10 shows in Teatro Gran Rex and traveled to Santa Fe getting great response from the fans. Rodríguez recorded a song for the second Grachi album with Isabella Castillo named M.A.P.S and was nominated to Nickelodeons Kids' Choice Awards Mexico for Best Supporting Actress and Kids' Choice Awards Argentina for Newcomer.

In 2013 she was named in the Best 10 Dressed for 2013 Latin Billboard Music Awards and signed with Telemundo for a new soap opera called Marido en alquiler who interprets the character of Sol Porras. Sol Rodriguez's latest performance was in Demente Criminal for Venevisión and Univision.

== Filmography ==
Film roles
Year	Title	Role	Notes
2015	Cartel	Sofía Villasante	
2017	Once Upon a Time in Venice	Consuela	
2017	You're gonna miss me	Sofía Vega	
2016	Bitch	Annabelle	
2018	Charlie Says	Gloria	
2023	Holiday in the Vineyards	Valentina Espinoza	
2023	The Words of Cayetano	The Muse	
2024	Seven Cemeteries	Guadalupe	

Television roles
Year	Title	Role	Notes
2011–13	Grachi	Mercedes "Mecha" Estevez	Main role, 205 episodes
2013	Marido en alquiler	Sol Porras	Recurring role
2014–15	Tierra de reyes	Lucía Crespo	Recurring role
2015	Relatos de un sueño americano	La Promesa	
2015	Demente criminal	Fernanda Sánchez	Recurring role
2016	Urban Cowboy	Romina	
2016	Devious Maids	Daniela Mercado	Main role (season 4)
2016	NCIS	Elena Silva	Episode: "Rogue"
2018	Alone Together	Caitlynn	Episode: "Sleepover"
2020	Party of Five	Natalia	Recurring role
2022	Star Trek: Picard	Teresa	Recurring role
2025	Peacemaker	Sasha Bordeaux	Season 2

== Musical theatre ==
Year	Title	Role	Show	Country
2012	Grachi El Show en Vivo	Mecha	Grachi	Mexico
2012	Grachi El Show en Vivo	Mecha	Grachi	Argentina

== Awards and nominations ==
Year	Award	Category	Work	Result
2012	Kids' Choice Awards México	Supporting Actress	Grachi	Nominated
2012	Kids' Choice Awards Argentina	Revelation	Grachi	Nominated
2013	Kids' Choice Awards Argentina	Best TV Actress	Grachi	Nominated
