= Rock Bones =

- Origin: Buenos Aires, Argentina
- Genres: Pop rock
- Years active: 2011–2014
- Label: Walt Disney Records
- Past members: Juan Ciancio; Gastón Vietto; Guido Pennelli

Rock Bones were an Argentine pop rock musical group from Buenos Aires. The band emerged in 2011 of the television series Peter Punk of Disney XD. The band is originally formed by lead singer and bassist Juan Ciancio, guitarist and backing vocalist Gastón Vietto and drummer Guido Pennelli.

== Discography ==
=== Studio albums ===
Title	The album details
Peter Punk	Published: July 19, 2011; Record label: Walt Disney Records; Formats: CD, Music download
Paso el tiempo	Published: March 5, 2013; Record label: Walt Disney Records; Formats: CD, Music download

=== Singles ===
Title	Year	Maximum position	Album
Title	Year	ARG	Album
«Superrealidad»	2011	—	Peter Punk
«Boys Don't Cry»	2011	—	Peter Punk
«Familia Punk»	2011	—	Peter Punk
«Somos Invencibles»	2011	—	Peter Punk
«Mi Verdad»	2011	20	Peter Punk
«Mi Perdición»	2012	—	Peter Punk
«Paso el tiempo»	2013	7	Paso el tiempo
«BB»	2013	—	Paso el tiempo
«Tonight»	2013	—	Paso el tiempo
«Vacaciones»	2014	—	Paso el tiempo
"—" It means that the song was not released or did not appear in the list.

=== Other appearances ===
Title	Year	Album
«Verano»	2012	Phineas and Ferb the Movie: Across the 2nd Dimension
«Mi perdición» (with Martina Stoessel)	2012	Cantar es lo que soy
«Cuatro vientos» (with Martina Stoessel)	2013	Violetta en vivo
