= Andrés Mercado =

Colombian actor and singer

Andres Cepeda
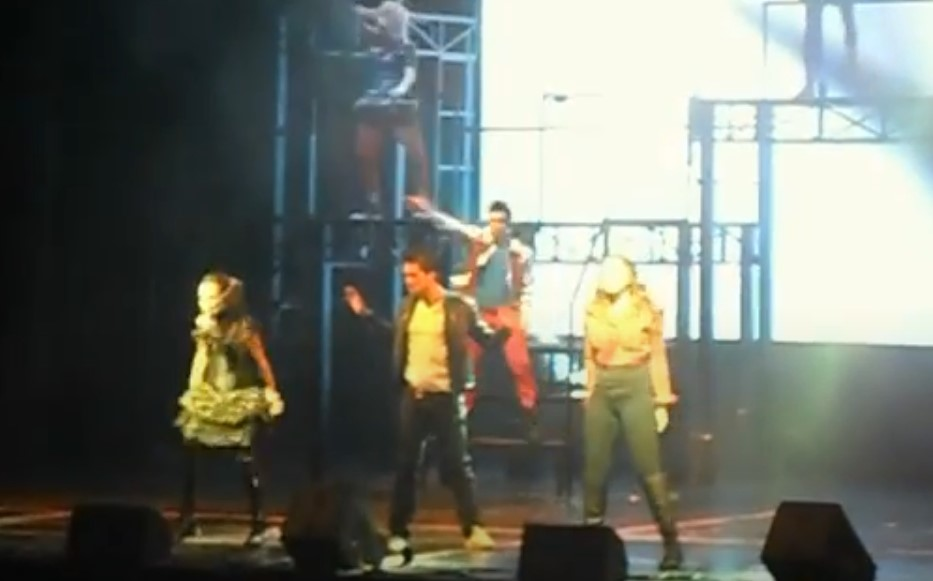
- Andrés Mercado and Isabella Castillo.
- Born: Andrés Felipe Mercado Cepeda; August 27, 1986 (age 39); Barranquilla, Colombia
- Occupations: Actor and singer
- Years active: 2005–present

Andrés Felipe Mercado Cepeda (born August 27, 1986, in Barranquilla, Colombia) is a Colombian actor and singer best known for playing Daniel Esquivel in Grachi. While going to school, he began study piano, painting and singing. In his childhood Mercado appeared in different television commercials.

== Biography ==
After working with acting tutors, Mercado decided to settle in New York for a year to have better training in areas such as improvisation and body awareness. He then returned to Colombia and continued his career as an actor, coming back to music for perfecting his vocal performance. He began his career at age 15 in the Colombian series Padres e hijos as Leonardo Pava. In 2005 he had a small role in El pasado no perdona, together with Wen Benamor. In 2006 he participated in the Colombian version of the telenovela Floricienta, in the role of Richie. In 2007 and 2008 he played Andrés Larrea in Pocholo. In 2009 and 2010 he was Iker in the Mexican telenovela Atrévete a soñar, along with Colombian actor Lucas Velázquez and Danna Paola.

He starred in the Nickelodeon Latin America production Grachi, as Daniel Esquivel, with Cuban actress Isabella Castillo.

== Filmography ==
Year	Title	Role	Notes
2004	Padres e hijos	Leonardo Pava	
2005	El pasado no perdona	Juan David	
2006	Tu voz estéreo	Simón	
2006	Floricienta	Richie	
2007-2008	Pocholo	Andrés Larrea	
2009-2010	Atrévete a soñar	Iker	
2011–2013	Grachi	Daniel Esquivel	
2013-2014	Quiero Amarte	Iván	
2016	Yo Soy Franky	Trece	
2017	Vikki RPM	Matías Ocampo	
2019	Club 57	Manuel Díaz	

== Awards ==
Year	Award	Category	Title	Result
2011	Kids Choice Awards Mexico	Favorite Male Character in a Series	Grachi	Won
2012	Kids Choice Awards Mexico	Favorite Actor	Grachi	Nominated
2012	Kids Choice Awards Argentina	Favorite Actor	Grachi	Nominated
