= Yo soy Franky =

Colombian telenovela

- Genre: Telenovela
- Created by: Marcela Citterrio
- Starring: María Gabriela de Faría; Martín Barba; Eduardo Pérez Martinez; Danielle Arciniegas Martinez; Luis Duarte; Kristal; Alejandra Chamorro; Emmanuel Restrepo; María José Pescador; Brandon Figueredo; Viviana Santos; Andrés Mercado
- Country of origin: Colombia
- Original language: Spanish
- No. of seasons: 2
- No. of episodes: 160

Production
- Camera setup: Multi-camera
- Production company: TeleVideo

Original release
- Network: Nickelodeon Latin America
- Release: September 28, 2015 – December 16, 2016

Related
- I Am Frankie

Yo soy Franky is a Colombian telenovela produced by TeleVideo for Nickelodeon Latin America. Written by Argentine author Marcela Citterrio, the show follows the story of a teen-robot named Franky (María Gabriela de Faría), who has been designed as if she were a human girl.

In 2017, Nickelodeon adapted the series for its global audience and uses the translated title and slight name change to its titular character, I Am Frankie. The first episode aired September 11, 2017. The adapted series stars Alex Hook as Frankie.

== Series overview ==
Season	Episodes		Originally released	
Season	Episodes		First released	Last released
1	60		September 28, 2015	December 18, 2015
2	100	60	May 30, 2016	August 19, 2016
2	100	40	October 24, 2016	December 16, 2016

== Synopsis ==
=== Season 1 (2015) ===
Sofia Andrade (Paula Barreto) is a great scientist who works in robotics, is married, and has a daughter named Clara Andrade (María José Pescador). Her husband, Wilson Andrade (Jorge López), is a writer of self-help books. For years, Sofia Andrade has been working on a new robot, a model Fr4nk13 called later known as Franky Andrade (María Gabriela de Faría). Franky is the biggest project of EGG Enterprises. When the project finally ended, Franky was ready, so Sofia Andrade sent her to school to live side by side with humans.

Now, Franky faces many problems and must protect her secret from being revealed. However, a new girl, Tamara Franco (Danielle Arciniegas), is determined to discover Franky's secret. With her friends, Franky must face her problems and adapt to a world between humans.

Tamara Franco has romantic feelings for Christian Montero Léon (Martín Barba), who is in love with Franky but is unaware that she is an android. Paul Mejía (George Slebi) is a scientist who frequently copies Sofía's ideas and believes that he is unlucky. Yo soy Franky is a comedy series that incorporates elements of romance and suspense.

=== Season 2 (2016) ===
Franky is now half-human, half-robot, thanks to her new heart. She faces new emotions, new enemies, new adventures... and realizes that coexistence between androids and humans is more complicated than everyone thought. Meanwhile, Sofia poses as Sabrina, the new nanny, thanks to the experiment C4MB10 (Change), which is a robotic case.

There is also the Anti-Robot League, led by Segundo Mejía, Paul's twin brother. Tamara finds out Franky is a robot and threatens to tell Segundo about it to destroy her. Franky will be in trouble, because Segundo is the new principal of Franky's school.

Roby Mejía will also become a superhero, with the help of his parents. But he must be careful, as the girls are trying to find out who hides behind the mask of Andromax.

=== Season 2 Part 2 (2016) ===
After Kassandra leaves the town with Franky's memories, there's a mysterious girl who has a lot of secrets. She has a mission in the year 2016 but in reality, she belongs in the future, in 2035. She attempts to make Cristian and Franky break up forever so humans and robots will never have peace with each other. However, then she starts discovering things about her true creator and her origin. The premiere of the second part of this season premiered on 24 October 2016. Yo Soy Franky's finale was on 16 December 2016 with a total of 160 episodes in all seasons.

After this, on 13 March 2017 Nickelodeon premiered a new series called Heidi, Bienvenida a Casa, from the same writer, Marcela Citterio. Also, the adapted version of Yo Soy Franky (called I Am Franky) premiered in the US on 11 September 2017.

== Cast ==
=== Main ===
- María Gabriela de Faría as Franky Andrade
- Martín Barba as Christian Montero Léon
- Eduardo Pérez as Roby Mejía Léon
- Danielle Arciniegas Martinez as Tamara Franco
- Luis Duarte as Iván Villamil
- Kristal as Loli Rivas
- Alejandra Chamorro as Delfina Montero Léon
- Emmanuel Restrepo as Mariano Puentes
- María José Pescador as Clara Andrade
- Brandon Figueredo as Benjamín Franco
- Viviana Santos as Doce Mejía (season 2; guest, season 1)
- Andrés Mercado as Andrés Mejía (season 2; guest, season 1)
- Isabella Castillo as Luz Andrade (season 2; guest, season 1)

=== Recurring (secondary roles) ===
- Paula Barreto as Sofía
- George Slebi as Paul/Segundo Mejía
- Jorge López as Wilson Andrade
- Jimena Durán as Margarita León
- José Manuel Ospina as Ramón Puentes
- Quique SanMartin as Quique
- Juan Pablo Obregón as Benito Franco

== Episodes ==
=== Season 1 (2015) ===
No. overall	No. in season	Title	Original release date
1	1	"Nace Franky"	September 28, 2015
2	2	"Franky fuera de control"	September 29, 2015
3	3	"¿Dónde está Franky?"	September 30, 2015
4	4	"Franky y sus huéspedes"	October 1, 2015
5	5	"Franky vs. Christian"	October 2, 2015
6	6	"Franky sin batería"	October 5, 2015
7	7	"El secreto de Franky"	October 6, 2015
8	8	"Franky fuera de tono"	October 7, 2015
9	9	"Franky es extraterrestre"	October 8, 2015
10	10	"Franky y Roby sin secretos"	October 9, 2015
11	11	"La abuela de Franky: Tecnología cero"	October 12, 2015
12	12	"Franky y Robby cambian de cuerpo"	October 13, 2015
13	13	"Franky y Robby famosos"	October 14, 2015
14	14	"Franky y Robby: Un amor de novela"	October 15, 2015
15	15	"Franky y sus dos novios"	October 16, 2015
16	16	"Franky salva a Cyber"	October 19, 2015
17	17	"Franky, no me olvides"	October 20, 2015
18	18	"Franky y Robby fuera de contagios"	October 21, 2015
19	19	"Franky y Robby adoptados"	October 22, 2015
20	20	"Franky y Robby clonados"	October 23, 2015
21	21	"Franky y Robby y una guerra de clones"	October 26, 2015
22	22	"Franky la más buena de las buenas"	October 27, 2015
23	23	"Franky en comedia musical"	October 28, 2015
24	24	"Franky conoce de la tristeza"	October 29, 2015
25	25	"Las lágrimas de Franky"	October 30, 2015
26	26	"Franky bloquea a Támara"	November 2, 2015
27	27	"Franky y su primera fiesta"	November 3, 2015
28	28	"Franky está celosa"	November 4, 2015
29	29	"Franky sin pasado"	November 5, 2015
30	30	"Franky tuvo un sueño"	November 6, 2015
31	31	"Franky tiene corazón"	November 9, 2015
32	32	"Franky vs. Robby"	November 10, 2015
33	33	"Franky a San Diego"	November 11, 2015
34	34	"Franky en peligro"	November 12, 2015
35	35	"Franky una chica normal"	November 13, 2015
36	36	"Franky, una nuera ideal"	November 16, 2015
37	37	"Franky y Robby inseparables"	November 17, 2015
38	38	"Franky a prueba de agua"	November 18, 2015
39	39	"Franky y su amigo secreto"	November 19, 2015
40	40	"Franky adicta a la red"	November 20, 2015
41	41	"Franky bajo el poder de Clara"	November 23, 2015
42	42	"El blog de Franky"	November 24, 2015
43	43	"Franky, la película"	November 25, 2015
44	44	"Franky y la Loba"	November 26, 2015
45	45	"Franky en busca de la felicidad"	November 27, 2015
46	46	"Franky descubre su vocación"	November 30, 2015
47	47	"Franky tiene una amiga peligrosa"	December 1, 2015
48	48	"Franky en el bosque"	December 2, 2015
49	49	"La lotería"	December 3, 2015
50	50	"Franky salva el colegio"	December 4, 2015
51	51	"Franky y Robby sin red"	December 7, 2015
52	52	"Franky y una buena acción"	December 8, 2015
53	53	"Franky en la final del App-A-Thon"	December 9, 2015
54	54	"Franky y Robby tienen terapia"	December 10, 2015
55	55	"¿Una chica peligrosa?"	December 11, 2015
56	56	"Franky y la abuela de Christian"	December 14, 2015
57	57	"Franky una chica responsable"	December 15, 2015
58	58	"El Concurso de los Androides (Parte I)"	December 16, 2015
59	59	"El Concurso de los Androides (Parte II)"	December 17, 2015
60	60	"Franky: ¡El Gran Final!"	December 18, 2015

=== Season 2 (2016) ===
No. overall	No. in season	Title	Original release date
61	1	"El regreso"	May 30, 2016
62	2	"Mi novia es un robot"	May 31, 2016
63	3	"Franky y Tamara, a todo o nada"	June 1, 2016
64	4	"Franky vs. la liga Anti-Robot"	June 2, 2016
65	5	"Franky, el fin del amor"	June 3, 2016
66	6	"La nueva vida de Franky"	June 4, 2016
67	7	"Franky y sus androides"	June 7, 2016
68	8	"Franky y la gemela"	June 8, 2016
69	9	"La desilusión de Franky"	June 9, 2016
70	10	"Franky y el chip de la maldad"	June 10, 2016
71	11	"Franky provoca epidemia de besos"	June 13, 2016
72	12	"Franky y Christian, un amor secreto"	June 14, 2016
73	13	"¿Franky y Trece son novios?"	June 15, 2016
74	14	"Franky, la obsesión de Trece"	June 16, 2016
75	15	"La ira de Franky"	June 17, 2016
76	16	"Franky descubre a su mamá"	June 20, 2016
77	17	"Franky y su amiga de La infancia"	June 21, 2016
78	18	"Franky en peligro"	June 22, 2016
79	19	"La abuela de Franky: El regreso"	June 23, 2016
80	20	"Franky y el gran androide"	June 24, 2016
81	21	"Franky y los falsos androides"	June 27, 2016
82	22	"Las manos de Franky"	June 28, 2016
83	23	"Franky y la máquina de detectar androides"	June 29, 2016
84	24	"Franky, protegida por mamá"	June 30, 2016
85	25	"Franky, una competidora desleal"	July 1, 2016
86	26	"¿Franky es una mentirosa?"	July 4, 2016
87	27	"Franky tiene olfato"	July 5, 2016
88	28	"Franky tiene poderes"	July 6, 2016
89	29	"Franky está ansiosa"	July 7, 2016
90	30	"Franky canta en vivo"	July 8, 2016
91	31	"Franky y sus androides al descubrimiento"	July 11, 2016
92	32	"El liderazgo de Franky"	July 12, 2016
93	33	"Franky y su otra abuela, la lucha continúa"	July 13, 2016
94	34	"Franky en busca de Roby"	July 14, 2016
95	35	"Franky + Fiesta"	July 15, 2016
96	36	"Franky al rescate de Roby"	July 18, 2016
97	37	"¿Franky enamorada de Andromax?"	July 19, 2016
98	38	"Franky y Christian, separados por Dulce"	July 20, 2016
99	39	"Franky y la prueba de la fidelidad"	July 21, 2016
100	40	"Franky ya no es Franky"	July 22, 2016
101	41	"El fan de Franky"	July 25, 2016
102	42	"Los defectos de Franky"	July 26, 2016
103	43	"Franky en cortocircuito"	July 27, 2016
104	44	"Franky tiene pereza"	July 28, 2016
105	45	"Franky, una chica virtual"	July 29, 2016
106	46	"Franky y la fiesta de disfraces"	August 1, 2016
107	47	"Franky y Benjamín son hermanos"	August 2, 2016
108	48	"Franky y el libro de los secretos"	August 3, 2016
109	49	"Franky puede comer helado"	August 4, 2016
110	50	"Franky al rescate de mamá"	August 5, 2016
111	51	"Franky tiene gripe"	August 8, 2016
112	52	"Franky y el súper exterminador"	August 9, 2016
113	53	"Franky: prototipo DOCE"	August 10, 2016
114	54	"Franky y el secreto de Roby"	August 11, 2016
115	55	"Franky en la semifinal del concurso de bandas"	August 12, 2016
116	56	"Franky y Brigitte, la nueva presidente de EGG"	August 15, 2016
117	57	"¿Franky es un robot?"	August 16, 2016
118	58	"Franky y la aceptación de los androides"	August 17, 2016
119	59	"El final de Franky y sus Androides"	August 18, 2016
120	60	"Franky atrapada sin salida"	August 19, 2016
121	61	"Franky y la androide misteriosa"	October 24, 2016
122	62	"Franky en el talk show"	October 25, 2016
123	63	"Franky regresa al colegio"	October 26, 2016
124	64	"Franky entre el bien y el mal"	October 27, 2016
125	65	"Un androide para Franky"	October 28, 2016
126	66	"Franky en busca de la memoria perdida"	October 31, 2016
127	67	"Franky y el androide espía"	November 1, 2016
128	68	"Franky tiene un tic nervioso"	November 2, 2016
129	69	"Franky y el back-up equivocado"	November 3, 2016
130	70	"Franky y Christian, juntos otra vez"	November 4, 2016
131	71	"Franky, un androide leal"	November 7, 2016
132	72	"Franky y la graduación de los androides"	November 8, 2016
133	73	"Franky en busca de Luz"	November 9, 2016
134	74	"Franky y el virus de la mentira"	November 10, 2016
135	75	"Franky y Clara en el pasado: (Parte I)"	November 11, 2016
136	76	"Franky y Clara en el pasado: (Parte II)"	November 14, 2016
137	77	"Franky muñeca"	November 15, 2016
138	78	"Franky y la huelga de padres"	November 16, 2016
139	79	"Franky y Christian...Androide"	November 17, 2016
140	80	"¿Quién creó a Christian Androide?"	November 18, 2016
141	81	"Franky y la app del sueño"	November 21, 2016
142	82	"Franky y los androides enfermeros"	November 22, 2016
143	83	"Franky y las elecciones escolares"	November 23, 2016
144	84	"Franky y el edificio embrujado"	November 24, 2016
145	85	"Franky y el viaje de las madres"	November 25, 2016
146	86	"Franky recupera la memoria"	November 28, 2016
147	87	"Franky, animadora infantil"	November 29, 2016
148	88	"Franky y las termitas devorametales"	November 30, 2016
149	89	"Franky en peligro de desaparecer"	December 1, 2016
150	90	"Franky, Loli y Tamara: Súper Detectives"	December 2, 2016
151	91	"Franky y el archivo confidencial"	December 5, 2016
152	92	"Franky, una amiga incondicional"	December 6, 2016
153	93	"Franky y el viaje de graduación: (Parte I)"	December 7, 2016
154	94	"Franky y el viaje de graduación: (Parte II)"	December 8, 2016
155	95	"Franky: La verdad sale a la luz"	December 9, 2016
156	96	"Franky vuelve al futuro"	December 12, 2016
157	97	"Franky en busca del prototipo perdido"	December 13, 2016
158	98	"Franky y Luz unidas para siempre"	December 14, 2016
159	99	"Franky y la batalla final: (Parte I)"	December 15, 2016
160	100	"Franky y la batalla final: (Parte II)"	December 16, 2016
