= List of programs broadcast by Nickelodeon (Latin America) =

This is a list of programs broadcast by Nickelodeon, a Latin American version of the United States cable channel counterpart. It does not include programs from sister channels or other countries.

== Current programming ==
- The Loud House
- Max & the Midknights
- The Patrick Star Show
- The Smurfs
- SpongeBob SquarePants
- The Thundermans: Undercover
- Wylde Pak

== Former programming ==
=== Original programming ===
- 11-11: En mi cuadra nada cuadra
- Club 57
- Doggy Day School
- Food Hunters
- Garden Academy
- Grachi
- Heidi, bienvenida a casa
- Isa TKM
- Isa TK+
- Julie and the Phantoms
- Kally's MashUp
- Karkú
- La Maga y el Camino Dorado
- Marcelo, Marmelo, Martelo
- Miss XV
- Nick Snack
- Nickers
- Noobees
- Papaya Bull
- Skimo
- Sueña conmigo
- Toni, la Chef
- Vikki RPM
- Yo soy Franky

=== Acquired from Nickelodeon (U.S.) ===
- 100 Things to Do Before High School
- Aaahh!!! Real Monsters
- The Adventures of Jimmy Neutron, Boy Genius
- The Adventures of Kid Danger
- The Adventures of Pete & Pete
- All Grown Up!
- All That
- Allegra's Window
- The Amanda Show
- America's Most Musical Family
- The Angry Beavers
- Animorphs
- Are You Afraid of the Dark?
- As Told by Ginger
- The Astronauts
- Avatar: The Last Airbender
- Baby Shark's Big Show!
- Back at the Barnyard
- The Barbarian and the Troll
- Bella and the Bulldogs
- Big Nate
- Big Time Rush
- Blaze and the Monster Machines
- Blue's Clues
- Blue's Clues & You!
- Blue's Room
- Breadwinners
- The Brothers García
- Bubble Guppies
- Bucket & Skinner's Epic Adventures
- Bunsen Is a Beast
- Butterbean's Café
- The Casagrandes
- CatDog
- Catscratch
- ChalkZone
- Clarissa Explains It All
- Cousin Skeeter
- Cousins for Life
- Danger Force
- Danny Phantom
- Dora and Friends: Into the City!
- Dora the Explorer
- Doug
- Drake & Josh
- Drama Club
- El Tigre: The Adventures of Manny Rivera
- Eureeka's Castle
- Every Witch Way
- The Fairly OddParents
- The Fairly OddParents: Fairly Odder
- Fanboy & Chum Chum
- Fred: The Show
- Fresh Beat Band of Spies
- Game Shakers
- Global Guts
- Go, Diego, Go!
- Group Chat
- Gullah Gullah Island
- Harvey Beaks
- The Haunted Hathaways
- Henry Danger
- Hey Arnold!
- House of Anubis
- How to Rock
- Hunter Street
- I Am Frankie
- iCarly
- Instant Mom
- Invader Zim
- It's Pony
- The Journey of Allen Strange
- Just for Kicks
- KaBlam!
- Kamp Koral: SpongeBob's Under Years
- Kenan & Kel
- Knight Squad
- Kung Fu Panda: Legends of Awesomeness
- The Legend of Korra
- Legends of the Hidden Temple
- Little Bill
- Lost in the West
- Make It Pop
- Marvin Marvin
- Middlemost Post
- The Mighty B!
- Monster High
- Monsters vs. Aliens
- Mr. Meaty
- Mutt & Stuff
- My Life as a Teenage Robot
- The Mystery Files of Shelby Woo
- The Naked Brothers Band
- Ned's Declassified School Survival Guide
- Nella the Princess Knight
- Ni Hao, Kai-Lan
- Nickelodeon Guts
- Nickelodeon's Unfiltered
- Nicky, Ricky, Dicky & Dawn
- Oh Yeah! Cartoons
- The Other Kingdom
- The Penguins of Madagascar
- Pig Goat Banana Cricket
- Planet Sheen
- The Really Loud House
- The Ren & Stimpy Show
- Rise of the Teenage Mutant Ninja Turtles
- Robot and Monster
- Rock Paper Scissors
- Rocket Power
- Rocko's Modern Life
- Rugrats
- Rugrats (2021)
- Sam & Cat
- Sanjay and Craig
- Santiago of the Seas
- School of Rock
- See Dad Run
- Shimmer and Shine
- Side Hustle
- Space Cases
- Star Falls
- Star Trek: Prodigy
- The Substitute
- Sunny Day
- Supah Ninjas
- T.U.F.F. Puppy
- Taina
- Tak and the Power of Juju
- Tales of the Teenage Mutant Ninja Turtles
- Talia in the Kitchen
- Team Umizoomi
- Teenage Mutant Ninja Turtles
- That Girl Lay Lay
- The Thundermans
- Transformers: EarthSpark
- The Troop
- True Jackson, VP
- Tyler Perry's Young Dylan
- Unfabulous
- Victorious
- Warped!
- Welcome to the Wayne
- Wendell & Vinnie
- The Wild Thornberrys
- WITS Academy
- Winx Club
- Wonder Pets!
- The X's
- You Gotta See This
- Zoey 101
- Zoofari

=== Acquired programming ===
- 31 Minutos
- Abby Hatcher
- The Addams Family
- The Adventures of Paddington
- The Adventures of Tintin
- ALF
- Alvinnn!!! and the Chipmunks
- Anna and Friends
- Babar
- Bananas in Pyjamas
- Barbie: Life in the Dreamhouse
- Ben & Holly's Little Kingdom
- Best & Bester
- Bewitched
- The Big Comfy Couch
- Blazing Dragons
- The Bureau of Magical Things
- The Busy World of Richard Scarry
- Captain Flamingo
- Care Bears
- Care Bears: Unlock the Magic
- Castelo Rá-Tim-Bum
- Chica vampiro
- Clueless
- Creepschool
- Cubix
- Deer Squad
- Diff'rent Strokes
- Digby Dragon
- Dorg Van Dango
- Dougie in Disguise
- Egyxos
- The Elephant Princess
- Ever After High
- The Facts of Life
- Fifi and the Flowertots
- Flying Rhino Junior High
- Frankenstein's Cat
- The Fresh Prince of Bel-Air
- Galidor: Defenders of the Outer Dimension
- Generation O!
- Get Blake!
- Get Smart
- Goldie's Oldies
- Growing Pains
- Growing Up Creepie
- Happy Days
- I Dream of Jeannie
- Jimmy Two-Shoes
- Juanito Jones
- Kappa Mikey
- Legend of the Dragon
- Lego City Adventures
- Life with Boys
- Little Bear
- Little Charmers
- Littlest Pet Shop
- Lola & Virginia
- Louie
- Lucky Fred
- The Magic School Bus
- Making the Band
- Martin Mystery
- Massive Monster Mayhem
- Max & Ruby
- Max & Shred
- Mischief City
- Monsuno
- Mork & Mindy
- The Munsters
- My Favorite Martian
- Mysticons
- The Neverending Story
- Ollie's Pack
- Overlord and the Underwoods
- The Oz Kids
- Paw Patrol
- Perfect Strangers
- Peter Rabbit
- Pippi Longstocking
- Poochini's Yard
- PopPixie
- Power Rangers Samurai
- Rabbids Invasion
- Rainbow Butterfly Unicorn Kitty
- Rainbow Rangers
- Rank the Prank
- Regal Academy
- Renford Rejects
- Ricky Sprocket: Showbiz Boy
- Ride
- Roary the Racing Car
- Rock Island Mysteries
- Rocket Monkeys
- Rotten Ralph
- Rupert
- Rusty Rivets
- S Club 7
- Sabrina, the Teenage Witch
- Sister, Sister
- Skyland
- Speed Racer: The Next Generation
- Spider-Man: The New Animated Series
- Spyders
- Stickin' Around
- Stuart Little: The Animated Series
- The Three Friends and Jerry
- Tickety Toc
- ToonMarty
- Top Wing
- Trollz
- The Twisted Timeline of Sammy & Raj
- Wayside
- Where on Earth Is Carmen Sandiego?
- The World of Tosh
- The Wubbulous World of Dr. Seuss
- You're on Nickelodeon, Charlie Brown
- Yakkity Yak
- Yu-Gi-Oh!
- Yu-Gi-Oh! GX
- Yvon of the Yukon
- Zokie of Planet Ruby

== See also ==
- List of programs broadcast by Nickelodeon (Brazil)
