= List of programs broadcast by Nickelodeon (Brazil) =

This is a list of programs formerly broadcast by Nickelodeon (Brazil). It does not include programs from sister channels nor other countries.

== Former programming ==
- 11-11: En mi cuadra nada cuadra
- 100 Things to Do Before High School
- 31 Minutos
- Aaahh!!! Real Monsters
- Abby Hatcher
- The Addams Family
- The Adventures of Jimmy Neutron, Boy Genius
- The Adventures of Kid Danger
- The Adventures of Pete & Pete
- ALF
- All Grown Up!
- All That
- Allegra's Window
- The Amanda Show
- America's Most Musical Family
- Anabel
- The Angry Beavers
- Animorphs
- Are You Afraid of the Dark?
- As Told by Ginger
- The Astronauts
- Avatar: The Last Airbender
- Babar
- Back at the Barnyard
- Bananas in Pyjamas
- The Barbarian and the Troll
- Bella and the Bulldogs
- Ben & Holly's Little Kingdom
- Best & Bester
- Bewitched
- Big Nate
- Big Time Rush
- Blaze and the Monster Machines
- Blazing Dragons
- Blue's Clues
- Blue's Room
- Breadwinners
- Brichos
- Brilhante F.C.
- Bubble Guppies
- Bucket & Skinner's Epic Adventures
- Bunsen Is a Beast
- The Bureau of Magical Things
- The Busy World of Richard Scarry
- Captain Flamingo
- Care Bears
- The Casagrandes
- CatDog
- Catscratch
- ChalkZone
- Clarissa Explains It All
- Club 57
- Clueless
- Cocoricó
- Cousin Skeeter
- Cousins for Life
- Creepschool
- Cubix
- Danger Force
- Danny Phantom
- Diff'rent Strokes
- Doggy Day School
- Dora and Friends: Into the City!
- Dora the Explorer
- Doug
- Dougie in Disguise
- Drake & Josh
- Drama Club
- El Tigre: The Adventures of Manny Rivera
- The Elephant Princess
- Eureeka's Castle
- Ever After High
- Every Witch Way
- The Facts of Life
- The Fairly OddParents
- The Fairly OddParents: A New Wish
- The Fairly OddParents: Fairly Odder
- Fanboy & Chum Chum
- Fifi and the Flowertots
- Flying Rhino Junior High
- Frankenstein's Cat
- Fred: The Show
- Fresh Beat Band of Spies
- The Fresh Prince of Bel-Air
- Galidor: Defenders of the Outer Dimension
- Game Shakers
- Generation O!
- Get Blake!
- Get Smart
- Global Guts
- Go, Diego, Go!
- Goldie's Oldies
- Grachi
- Group Chat
- Growing Pains
- Growing Up Creepie
- Gullah Gullah Island
- Happy Days
- Harvey Beaks
- The Haunted Hathaways
- Heidi, bienvenida a casa
- Henry Danger
- Hey Arnold!
- House of Anubis
- How to Rock
- Hunter Street
- I Am Frankie
- I Dream of Jeannie
- iCarly
- Invader Zim
- Isa TKM/Isa TK+
- It's Pony
- Jimmy Two-Shoes
- The Journey of Allen Strange
- Julie e os Fantasmas
- Juanito Jones
- Just for Kicks
- KaBlam!
- Kamp Koral: SpongeBob's Under Years
- Kappa Mikey
- Karkú
- Kally's Mashup
- Kenan & Kel
- Knight Squad
- Kung Fu Panda: Legends of Awesomeness
- Legend of the Dragon
- The Legend of Korra
- Legends of the Hidden Temple
- Lego City Adventures
- Life with Boys
- Little Bill
- Little Charmers
- Littlest Pet Shop
- Lola & Virginia
- Lost in the West
- The Loud House
- Louie
- Lucky Fred
- The Magic School Bus
- Make It Pop
- Massive Monster Mayhem
- Marcelo, Marmelo, Martelo
- Martin Mystery
- Marvin Marvin
- Max Adventures
- Max & Ruby
- Max & Shred
- Middlemost Post
- The Mighty B!
- Miss XV
- Monster High
- Monsters vs. Aliens
- Monsuno
- Mork & Mindy
- Mr. Meaty
- The Munsters
- Mutt & Stuff
- My Favorite Martian
- My Life as a Teenage Robot
- The Mystery Files of Shelby Woo
- Mysticons
- The Naked Brothers Band
- Ned's Declassified School Survival Guide
- Nella the Princess Knight
- The Neverending Story
- Ni Hao, Kai-Lan
- Nickelodeon's Unfiltered
- Nickers
- Nicky, Ricky, Dicky & Dawn
- Noobees
- O Menino Mais Rico do Mundo
- Oh Yeah! Cartoons
- Ollie's Pack
- The Other Kingdom
- The Oz Kids
- Papaya Bull
- The Patrick Star Show
- Paw Patrol
- The Penguins of Madagascar
- Perfect Strangers
- Peter Rabbit
- Pig Goat Banana Cricket
- Pippi Longstocking
- Planet Sheen
- Poochini's Yard
- PopPixie
- Power Rangers Samurai
- Ra-Tim-Bum Castle
- Rabbids Invasion
- Rainbow Butterfly Unicorn Kitty
- Rank the Prank
- The Really Loud House
- Regal Academy
- The Ren & Stimpy Show
- Renford Rejects
- Ricky Sprocket: Showbiz Boy
- Ride
- Rise of the Teenage Mutant Ninja Turtles
- Roary the Racing Car
- Robot and Monster
- Rock Island Mysteries
- Rock Paper Scissors
- Rocket Monkeys
- Rocket Power
- Rocko's Modern Life
- Rugrats
- Rugrats (2021)
- Rupert
- Rusty Rivets
- S Club 7
- Sabrina, the Teenage Witch
- Sam & Cat
- Sanjay and Craig
- School of Rock
- See Dad Run
- Shimmer and Shine
- Side Hustle
- Sister, Sister
- Skimo
- Skyland
- The Smurfs
- Space Cases
- Speed Racer: The Next Generation
- Spider-Man: The New Animated Series
- SpongeBob SquarePants
- Spyders
- Star Falls
- Stickin' Around
- Stuart Little: The Animated Series
- The Substitute
- Sueña conmigo
- Sunny Day
- Supah Ninjas
- T.U.F.F. Puppy
- Taina
- Tainá and the Guardians of the Amazon
- Tak and the Power of Juju
- Tales of the Teenage Mutant Ninja Turtles
- Team Umizoomi
- Teenage Mutant Ninja Turtles
- That Girl Lay Lay
- The Three Friends and Jerry
- The Thundermans
- The Thundermans: Undercover
- Tickety Toc
- ToonMarty
- Top Wing
- Transformers: EarthSpark
- Trollz
- The Troop
- The Twisted Timeline of Sammy & Raj
- The Under Undergrounds
- True Jackson, VP
- Tyler Perry's Young Dylan
- Unfabulous
- Victorious
- Vikki RPM
- Wayside
- Welcome to the Wayne
- Wendell & Vinnie
- Where on Earth Is Carmen Sandiego?
- The Wild Thornberrys
- Winx Club
- WITS Academy
- Wonder Pets!
- The World of Tosh
- The Wubbulous World of Dr. Seuss
- Wylde Pak
- The X's
- Yakkity Yak
- Yo soy Franky
- You Gotta See This
- You're on Nickelodeon, Charlie Brown
- Yu-Gi-Oh!
- Yu-Gi-Oh! GX
- Yvon of the Yukon
- Zica and the Chameleons
- Zoey 101
- Zokie of Planet Ruby

== See also ==
- List of programs broadcast by Nickelodeon (Latin America)
