= Marcelo, Marmelo, Martelo =

Marcelo, Marmelo, Martelo may refer to:

- Marcelo, Marmelo, Martelo (book), a 1976 book by Ruth Rocha
- Marcelo, Marmelo, Martelo (TV series), a Brazilian television series
