= Kids' Choice Awards Argentina 2017 =

Nickelodeon's 7th Annual Kids' Choice Awards Argentina
- Date: 19 October 2017
- Location: Teatro Coliseo; Buenos Aires, Argentina
- Hosted by: Mercedes Lambre; Leandro Leunis
- Most awards: Lali (2); Camila Cabello (2); Isabella Castillo (2); Mica Viciconte (2)
- Most nominations: Lali (3); Isabella Castillo (3)

Television/radio coverage
- Network: Nickelodeon; Telefe
- Runtime: 90 minutes (8:00–9:30 PM UTC−3)

The 7th Annual Nickelodeon Argentina Kids' Choice Awards was held on 19 October 2017, at Teatro Coliseo in Buenos Aires, and was broadcast on 21 October 2017 through Nickelodeon. Mercedes Lambre and Leandro Leunis hosted the ceremony. Lali and Isabella Castillo led nominations with three each, and also were the biggest winners of the night, along with Camila Cabello and Mica Viciconte, with two awards each. Susana Giménez received the Career Achievement Award.

== Hosts ==
- Mercedes Lambre and Leandro Leunis
- Stéfano de Gregorio (backstage)

== Performances ==
| Artist(s) | Song(s) |
|---|---|
| Piso 21 | "Besándote" "Me Llamas" |
| Kally's MashUp cast | "Key of Life" "Baby Be Mine" |
| Oriana Sabatini | "Stay or Run" "Love Me Down Easy" |
| MYA | "Amor Prohibido" |
| Abraham Mateo; Lali | "Loco Enamorado" (Mateo) "Mueve" "Una Na" (Lali) |
| Fer Vázquez; Meri Deal | "La Fiesta Comienza" |

== Presenters ==
- Valentina Zenere and Denise Dumas — presented Favourite Male YouTuber
- Rocío Igarzábal — introduced Piso 21
- Eleonora Wexler and Sebastián Estevanez — presented Favourite Actor and Favourite Actress
- Nacho Nayar and Ramiro Nayar — presented Favourite Digital Newcomer
- Heidi, bienvenida a casa cast — introduced Kally's MashUp cast
- Belu Lucius and Kevsho — presented Favourite Villain
- Leo Deluglio — presented Favourite Web Series and Favourite Couple
- Victorio D'Alessandro and Vicky Ramos — introduced Oriana Sabatini
- Marley — presented Career Achievement Award
- Guada and Juani — introduced MYA
- Austín Bernasconi — presented Trendy Boy award
- Agustina Casanova and Diego Poggi — presented Favourite TV Show
- Michael Ronda and Jórge Lopez — presented Favourite Radio Show
- Andy Kusnetzoff — presented Pro-Social Award
- Franco Masini and Delfina Chaves — presented Trendy Girl award
- Airbag — presented Favourite Female YouTuber

== Winners and nominees ==
- Nominees were announced on September 21, 2017.
- Winners are listed first, in bold. Other nominees are in alphabetical order.

=== Music ===
| Favourite International Artist | Favourite National Artist |
|---|---|
| **Camila Cabello**; BTS; Justin Bieber; Shawn Mendes | **Lali**; Axel; Oriana Sabatini; Rombai |
| Favourite Collaboration | Favourite Song |
| **"Hey Ma" – Pitbull and J Balvin featuring Camila Cabello**; "Despacito" – Luis Fonsi featuring Daddy Yankee; "Hey DJ" – CNCO and Yandel; "It Ain't Me" – Kygo and Selena Gomez | **"Una Na" – Lali**; "Love Me Down Easy" – Oriana Sabatini; "Mi Gente" – J Balvin and Willy William; "Reggaetón Lento (Bailemos)" – CNCO |

=== TV and movies ===
| Favorite Actor | Favorite Actress |
|---|---|
| **Michael Ronda**; Harold Azuara; Joaquín Ochoa; Nazareno Casero | **Carolina Kopelioff**; Brenda Asnicar; Mercedes Lambre; Paulina Vetrano |
| Favourite TV Show | Favourite International TV Show |
| **Soy Luna**; Heidi, bienvenida a casa; O11CE; Vikki RPM | **Liv and Maddie**; School of Rock; Stuck in the Middle; The Thundermans |
| Favourite Villain | Favourite Couple |
| **Isabella Castillo**; Scarlet Gruber; Sebastián Athié; Valentina Zenere | **Isabella Castillo and Leo Deluglio**; Nicolás Riedel and Melisa Garat; Stefano Ollivier and Scarlet Gruber; Victorio D'Alessandro and Vicky Ramos |
| Favourite Cartoon | Favourite Reality Show |
| **SpongeBob SquarePants**; Star vs. the Forces of Evil; The Powerpuff Girls; We Bare Bears | **Combate**; A todo o nada; Dueños de la cocina; ¿En qué mano está? |
| Nickelodeon Latin America 20th Anniversary Award | Favourite Movie |
| **Big Time Rush**; Hey Arnold!; iCarly; Zoey 101 | **Beauty and the Beast**; Despicable Me 3; The Boss Baby; The Emoji Movie |

=== Digital ===
| Favourite Male YouTuber | Favourite Female YouTuber |
|---|---|
| **Dosogas**; Julián Serrano; Kevsho; Lionel Ferro | **Mica Suárez**; Daiana Hernández; María Becerra; Yoana Marlen Style |
| Favourite Web Series | Favourite Digital Newcomer |
| **Mecanickando**; La Velocidad de la Luz; Secretarias; Soy Rada Live Show | **Bárbara Martínez**; Azu Makeup; Mike Chouhy; Mili Masini |
| Favourite Instagrammer | Favourite Gamer |
| **Nati Jota**; Gonzalo Goette; Magalí Tajes; Sofi Morandi | **Lyna**; AlfreditoGames; DeiGamer; RobleisIUTU |
| Trendy Girl | Trendy Boy |
| **Micaela Viciconte**; Candelaria Molfese; Isabella Castillo; Stephanie Demner | **Agustín Bernasconi**; Agustín Casanova; Franco Masini; Victorio D'Alessandro |
| Favourite Musical.ly | Best Fandom |
| **Candelaria Copello**; Juana Tinelli; RobleisIUTU; Violeta Narvay | **Micaelistas** (Micaela Viciconte); Army (BTS); Lalitos (Lali); Serranistas (Julián Serrano) |

=== Miscellaneous ===
| Favourite Radio Show | Favourite Athlete |
|---|---|
| **Morning Time**; El Club del Moro; El Despertador; Oh My God! | **Paulo Dybala**; Delfina Merino; Leonardo Mayer; Manu Ginóbili |
| Career Achievement Award | Pro-Social Award |
| **Susana Giménez** | **Fundación Sí** |
