= Nickelodeon Argentina Kids' Choice Awards =

Nickelodeon Kids' Choice Awards Argentina
- Country: Argentina
- Presented by: Nickelodeon (Latin America)
- Reward: KCA Blimp
- First award: 11 October 2011
- Final award: 25 August 2018
- Website: https://kidschoiceawardsargentina.mundonick.com

Television/radio coverage
- Network: Nickelodeon (Latin America)
- Runtime: Approx. 90-120 min. including commercials

The Nickelodeon Kids' Choice Awards Argentina, also known as the KCAAs and/or Kids Choice Awards Argentina, was an annual awards show that airs on Nickelodeon in Latin America. Its first edition was held on 11 October 2011 at the Microestadio Malvinas Argentinas. As in the original version, winners receive a hollow orange blimp figurine, a logo outline for much of the network's 1984-2009 era, which also functions as a kaleidoscope.

== Hosts ==
Year	Date	Host(s)	Venue
2011	11 October 2011	Nicolás Vázquez	Microestadio Malvinas Argentinas
2012	5 October 2012	Favio Posca	Microestadio Malvinas Argentinas
2013	18 October 2013	Diego Ramos	Microestadio Malvinas Argentinas
2014	29 October 2014	Marley	Teatro Ópera Allianz
2015	22 October 2015	Benjamín Amadeo	Teatro Ópera Allianz
2016	13 October 2016	Victorio D'Alessandro and Franco Masini	Teatro Coliseo
2017	19 October 2017	Leandro Leunis and Mercedes Lambre	Teatro Coliseo
2018	25 August 2018	Verónica Lozano and Kevsho	Estadio Obras de la Ciudad de Buenos Aires

== Kids' Choice Awards Argentina 2012 ==
It was confirmed the second edition for the KCA Argentina, and occurred on 5 October 2012.

== Kids' Choice Awards Argentina 2013 ==
Event occurred on 18 October 2013.

== Kids' Choice Awards Argentina 2017 ==
The 7th Annual Nickelodeon Argentina Kids' Choice Awards was held on 19 October 2017, at Teatro Coliseo in Buenos Aires, and was telecast on 21 October 2017 through Nickelodeon. Mercedes Lambre and Leandro Leunis hosted the ceremony. Lali and Isabella Castillo led nominations with three each, and also were the biggest winners of the night, along with Camila Cabello and Mica Viciconte, with two awards each. Susana Giménez received the Career Achievement Award.

== Kids' Choice Awards Argentina 2018 ==
It was held for the last time on 25 August 2018.
