= Leo Deluglio =

Argentine actor and singer

- Born: May 27, 1990 (age 35); Buenos Aires, Argentina
- Occupation(s): Actor, singer
- Years active: 2009–present
- Website: leodeluglio.com

Leo Deluglio (born 27 May 1990) is an Argentine actor and singer. He is known for his recurring role as Diego Padilla in the Telemundo telenovela La Doña, and for his role as Iker of the Nickelodeon series Vikki RPM.

== Filmography ==
Television roles
Year	Title	Role	Notes
2009	Champs 12	Matías Rey	Recurring role; 127 episodes
2011–2013	Cuando toca la campana	Miguel	Recurring role; 70 episodes
2011	El blog de DJ	Miguel	Episode: "Soportando la fila"
2015–2016	Como dice el dicho	Nicolás / Santiago	2 episodes
2016–2020	La Doña	Diego Padilla	Recurring role (season 1–2); 160 episodes
2017	Vikki RPM	Iker	Main role; 60 episodes
2017	Milagros de Navidad	Benjamín	Episode: "Adiós Benjamín"
2018	Y mañana será otro día	Killer	2 episodes
2018	Sin miedo a la verdad	Kike	Episode: "Mirreyes impunes"
2021	¿Quién mató a Sara?	Alejandro Guzmán "Alex" (young)	Netflix series

== Awards and nominations ==
Year	Award	Category	Work	Result	Refs
2017	Kids' Choice Awards Argentina	Ship Nick (with Isabella Castillo)	Vikki RPM	Won	
