= Soñar no cuesta nada =

Soñar no cuesta nada may refer to:

- Soñar no Cuesta Nada (album), by Cuban singer Isabella Castillo
- Soñar no cuesta nada (film), a 1941 Argentine film
- Soñar no cuesta nada (TV series), a 2005 telenovela
