= La Usurpadora: The Musical =

2023 film by Santiago Limón

- Theatrical release poster
- Directed by: Santiago Limón
- Screenplay by: Santiago Limón; María Hinojos
- Adaptation by: Eduardo Cisneros; Jason Shuman
- Based on: La usurpadora by Inés Rodena
- Produced by: Matt Walden; Paul Presburger
- Starring: Isabella Castillo; Alan Estrada; Cecilia Toussaint; Susana Zabaleta; Jesús Ochoa; Alejandra Guzmán; Gabriela Spanic
- Cinematography: Danny Hiele
- Edited by: Martha Poly Vil
- Music by: Amado López
- Production companies: Walden Entertainment; The Lift Entertainment
- Distributed by: Pantelion Films (United States); Videocine (Mexico)
- Release dates: March 22, 2023 (Tucson, Arizona); April 7, 2023 (United States); April 12, 2023 (Mexico)
- Running time: 115 minutes
- Countries: Mexico; United States
- Languages: Spanish; English
- Box office: $883,218

La Usurpadora: The Musical is a 2023 musical crime comedy film directed by Santiago Limón from a screenplay he co-wrote with María Hinojos, based on the 1998 Mexican telenovela La usurpadora. The film stars Isabella Castillo, Alan Estrada, Cecilia Toussaint, Susana Zabaleta and Jesús Ochoa, with special appearances by Alejandra Guzmán and Gabriela Spanic.

== Plot ==
During a secret meeting with her lover in Las Vegas, Victoria meets a hotel employee identical to her, Valeria, and convinces her to switch lives.

== Cast ==
- Isabella Castillo as Valeria and Victoria
- Alan Estrada as Carlos Daniel
- Susana Zabaleta as Dona Ines
- Jesús Ochoa as Don Ramiro
- Cecilia Toussaint as Abuelita
- Valentina as Lydia
- Alejandra Ley as Lupita
- Alejandra Guzmán
- Gabriela Spanic
- Shane West as Chad

== Production ==
Principal photography began in December 2021 in Mexico City and the Mexican states of Hidalgo, Jalisco, and Nayarit.

== Release ==
The film received a preview screening in Tucson, Arizona, on March 22, 2023. It was released theatrically in the United States on April 7, 2023, by Pantelion Films, and in Mexico on April 12, 2023, by Videocine.

== Reception ==
Mary Aviles of Common Sense Media awarded the film three stars out of five.
