= Sed de venganza =

- Genre: Drama
- Based on: Pura sangre by Mauricio Navas, Conchita Ruiz & Tania Cárdenas
- Developed by: Eric Vonn
- Directed by: Camilo Vega; Miguel Varoni; Uandari Gómez
- Starring: Isabella Castillo; Danilo Carrera; Alexa Martín
- Theme music composer: Gerardo Jesús Ramírez; César Augusto Rodríguez; Luis Fernando Silva Brizuela
- Opening theme: "Sed de venganza" by César Augusto Rodríguez & Isabella Castillo
- Composers: Joaquín Fernández; Rodrigo Maurovich
- Country of origin: United States
- Original language: Spanish
- No. of seasons: 1
- No. of episodes: 83

Production
- Executive producers: Rafael Uriostegui; Ximena Cantuarias
- Producer: Minu Chacin
- Editors: Carlos Leal; Ramiro Pardo; Leandro Tizzano
- Production company: Telemundo Studios

Original release
- Network: Telemundo
- Release: 15 October 2024 – 6 March 2025

Sed de venganza is an American television series that aired on Telemundo from 15 October 2024 to 6 March 2025. It is based on the 2007 Colombian telenovela Pura sangre created by Mauricio Navas, Conchita Ruiz and Tania Cárdenas. The series stars Isabella Castillo, Danilo Carrera and Alexa Martín.

== Plot ==
Fernanda Ríos bears the scars of her childhood traumas and, under the guidance of her mentor and lover, Eugenio Beltran, was trained to carry out a plan of revenge against the Del Pino family. With an identity built around this revenge, Fernanda infiltrates the Del Pino family, undermining its members in order to take over their company and their wealth. Ten years later, Francisco, whom Fernanda betrayed in the past, returns seeking revenge, now under the identity of Emilio Montenegro. However, Fernanda is unaware of his true identity and his arrival awakens in her an unexpected passion that complicates her plans for revenge.

== Cast ==
=== Main ===
- Isabella Castillo as Fernanda Ríos / Regina Castaño
- Danilo Carrera as Francisco Ramírez / Emilio Montenegro
  - Jesús Nasser as young Francisco
- Alexa Martín as Elisa del Pino
  - Gabriela Borges as young Elisa
- Carlos Torres as Gabriel del Pino
- Sebastián Carvajal as Marcelo Echeverri
  - Steven González as young Marcelo
- Diego Olivera as Eugenio Beltrán
- Daniela Martínez as Mónica Rodríguez
- Roberto Romano as Alonso del Pino
- Fefi Oliveira as Brenda Ferrero
- Rodolfo Salas as Roberto León
- María José Camacho as Ana del Pino
  - Isairis Rodríguez as young Ana
- Javier Ponce as Sebastián del Pino
- Sandra Itzel as Patricia Flores
- Humberto Búa as Fermín Pérez
- Roberta Burns as Tania Villanueva
- María Laura Quintero as Erika Flores
- Claudia Coira as Claudia Flores
- María Eugenia Arboleda as Mirna Guerrero
- Saúl Lisazo as Alfredo del Pino
- Gabriel Coronel as Joseph Price

=== Recurring and guest stars ===
- Katie Barberi as María Laura
- César Román as Arredondo
- Roberto Jaramillo as Ignacio Montaño
- Elba Escobar as Manuela
- Carlos Acosta Milian as Adalberto Ferrero
- Darío Dahbar as Richard
- Carolina Perpetuo as Ninette Ferrero
- Aneudy Lara as Miguel
- Juan Carlos García as Alfredo's Attorney
- Pedro Pablo Porras as Rafita
- Manuela Corzo as Lindy Love
- Claudia Valdes as Aleida
- Ricardo Kleinbaum as Antonio Rivero
- Ricardo Burgos as Ramón Amaro

== Production ==
On 2 May 2024, Sed de venganza was announced by Telemundo, with Danilo Carrera and Isabella Castillo cast in the lead roles. A week later, Telemundo released a teaser trailer for the series. Filming began on 3 June 2024.

== Episodes ==
No.	Title	Original air date
1	"Prueba de lealtad"	15 October 2024
2	"Se acabó"	16 October 2024
3	"Caiga quien caiga"	17 October 2024
4	"Desilusión"	18 October 2024
5	"Cara a cara"	21 October 2024
6	"Dueña de nada"	22 October 2024
7	"Atrapada"	23 October 2024
8	"Boda incierta"	24 October 2024
9	"No es presa fácil"	25 October 2024
10	"Sed de pasión"	28 October 2024
11	"Paso en falso"	29 October 2024
12	"Eugenio Beltrán"	30 October 2024
13	"Tiro por la culata"	31 October 2024
14	"Lo inevitable"	1 November 2024
15	"Apasionados"	4 November 2024
16	"Cuidado, mucho cuidado"	6 November 2024
17	"Socios y amantes"	7 November 2024
18	"En el limbo"	8 November 2024
19	"Amor o pasión"	11 November 2024
20	"Sin escape"	12 November 2024
21	"Entre culpables"	13 November 2024
22	"Fin del engaño"	14 November 2024
23	"Venganza silenciosa"	18 November 2024
24	"El miedo acecha"	20 November 2024
25	"Entre espías"	21 November 2024
26	"No hay marcha atrás"	22 November 2024
27	"Falsas lealtades"	25 November 2024
28	"Rastro perdido"	26 November 2024
29	"Doble intención"	27 November 2024
30	"Llegó el momento"	29 November 2024
31	"Bajo control"	2 December 2024
32	"Confesiones"	3 December 2024
33	"La verdad al descubierto"	5 December 2024
34	"Entre el odio y la compasión"	6 December 2024
35	"Lazos rotos"	9 December 2024
36	"Sin vuelta atrás"	10 December 2024
37	"Con la vida revuelta"	12 December 2024
38	"Sin salida"	16 December 2024
39	"Tan cerca, tan lejos"	17 December 2024
40	"No puede ser"	18 December 2024
41	"Con la misma moneda"	19 December 2024
42	"Pase lo que pase"	23 December 2024
43	"La duda consume"	25 December 2024
44	"Encanto prohibido"	26 December 2024
45	"Crece la decepción"	30 December 2024
46	"Al descubierto"	1 January 2025
47	"De manos atadas"	2 January 2025
48	"Doble traición"	6 January 2025
49	"Momento decisivo"	7 January 2025
50	"El peso de la verdad"	8 January 2025
51	"La herida eterna"	9 January 2025
52	"Mío o de nadie"	13 January 2025
53	"No voy a rendirme"	14 January 2025
54	"Lucha inútil"	15 January 2025
55	"Golpe Bajo"	16 January 2025
56	"Triunfo incompleto"	20 January 2025
57	"Amor sin límites"	21 January 2025
58	"Verdad prohibida"	22 January 2025
59	"El encargo"	23 January 2025
60	"Cambio de juego"	27 January 2025
61	"La heredera oculta"	28 January 2025
62	"Ajuste de cuentas"	29 January 2025
63	"A la vista"	30 January 2025
64	"Un enemigo en la mira"	3 February 2025
65	"Beso de Judas"	4 February 2025
66	"El teatro del engaño"	5 February 2025
67	"Sin tiempo que perder"	6 February 2025
68	"Piedras en el camino"	10 February 2025
69	"Fuera del juego"	11 February 2025
70	"Ojo por ojo"	12 February 2025
71	"Noticia inesperada"	13 February 2025
72	"Un destino inevitable"	17 February 2025
73	"El culpable"	18 February 2025
74	"Puñalada trapera"	19 February 2025
75	"Sin coartadas"	20 February 2025
76	"Muestra de compasión"	24 February 2025
77	"Sin barreras"	25 February 2025
78	"Acorralados"	26 February 2025
79	"Para siempre"	27 February 2025
80	"No tiene perdón"	3 March 2025
81	"Hasta nunca"	4 March 2025
82	"El derrumbe de la ilusión"	5 March 2025
83	"Autocondena"	6 March 2025

== Distribution ==
On 19 March 2025 it was added to Disney+ in Latin America (including Brazil with its Brazilian Portuguese dub), marking its debut in the region.

On 20 October 2025 it began airing on Telemundo Africa. On 21 January 2026, Amazon Prime Video added the series in the United Kingdom, both in Africa and the U.K. it is dubbed in English.
