= Isabella Castillo =

American actress (born 1994)

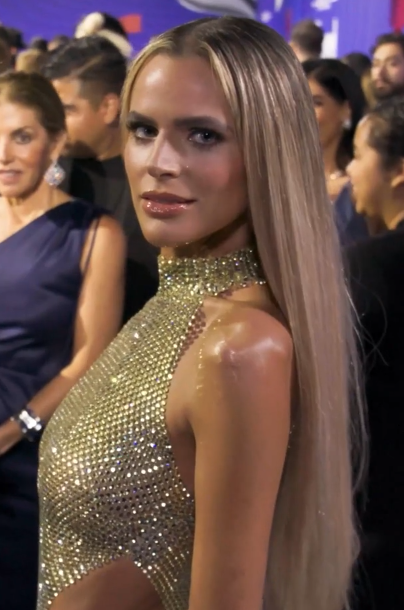
- Castillo in 2024
- Born: Isabella Castillo Díaz; 23 December 1994 (age 31); Havana, Cuba
- Occupations: Actress; singer
- Years active: 2008–present
- Spouse: Matías Novoa (m. 2019; div. 2021)
- Website: isabellacastillo.com

Signature
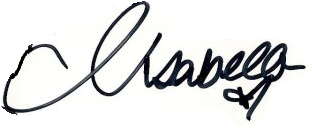

Isabella Castillo Díaz (born 23 December 1994) is a Cuban-American actress and singer. She is best known for her role as Grachi, the lead character of the Nickelodeon TV series Grachi, for which has released several soundtrack albums. Castillo has also starred on other successful TV series and telenovelas such as Tierra de reyes, Sed de venganza, El Señor de los Cielos, Club 57, The Inmate and Malverde: El Santo Patrón, as well as the musical film La Usurpadora: The Musical.

== Biography and career ==
Isabella Castillo was born on 23 December 1994, daughter of singer Delia Díaz de Villegas and percussionist José Castillo. Her older sister is Giselle, a pianist and music teacher. In 1997, at the age of three, she emigrated to Belize, moving to Miami, Florida, some months later. At the age of five, she debuted as a singer in one of her mother's concerts: from that moment, she began to take dancing, singing and acting lessons, studying music at Musical Procenter and winning four times the Grand Prize at the Youth Fair of the Florida International University. On 26 March 2005, she won the first prize as Most Promising in the Children Singing Division at the USA World Showcase and on 15 July, she took the stage on the Manuel Artime Theater in Miami in the musical Fantasia en Disney; she also participated in the contest Best New Talent in Los Angeles and in the concert offered by the Israeli Embassy for Cuban people living in the USA. In 2007, she gained the Magnet Outstanding Performance recognition at the South Miami Middle Community School and she was invited to honor the neo-elected president of Israel Shimon Peres. Again in 2007, persuaded by the producer Óscar Gómez, she started an intensive course of acting with Cuban actress Lili Rentería, preparing for the audition in Madrid for the musical El diario de Ana Frank – Un canto a la vida; moving in Spain with her family, after three rounds of auditions she was given the main role. The musical, which opened on 28 February 2008, won her the Gran Via Award as Best Revelation in a Musical.

Back in the United States in 2009, she began her acting career in Telemundo on the telenovela El fantasma de Elena (2010), in which she played as seventeen-year-old girl Andrea Girón; at the end of Elena, she got the role of Grachi, the main character of the homonymous telenovela of Nickelodeon Latin America. During the broadcast, in February 2012, of the second of three seasons, Castillo participated in the musical Grachi: El show en vivo. Thanks to Grachi, between 2011 and 2012, Castillo won the Favorite Actress award at the Kids' Choice Awards México, Kids' Choice Awards Argentina and Meus Prêmios Nick, becoming also the first to win the Favorite Latin Artist award at the 2012 Kids' Choice Awards.

In February 2013, she signed with Warner Music Latina for her first album, Soñar no Cuesta Nada, released on 23 April. In March, Castillo won the Favorite Latin Artist Award for the second time at the 2013 Kids' Choice Awards. In September 2014, singer Patricio Arellano published his third album, featuring a duet with Castillo titled "Que duermas conmigo". On 21 October, it was announced that Castillo was cast in the telenovela Tierra de reyes and portrayed the dual role of Alma Gallardo and Verónica Saldívar. She also appeared on ¿Quién es quién?. Meanwhile, she acted in Araceli Álvarez de Sotomayor's Tacones enanos, a Spanish theater play, from 9 December 2015 to 10 January 2016.

In 2019, she received the McAllen Texas Keys of the City.

== Filmography ==
=== Movies ===
Year	Title	Role	Notes	Ref.
2023	La Usurpadora: The Musical	Valeria and Victoria Bracho		
2025	Mirreyes contra Godínez: Las Vegas	Elvira		

=== Television ===
Year	Title	Role	Notes	Ref.
2010	El fantasma de Elena	Andrea Girón	Recurring role	
2011	Grachi: Quiero Mis 16, Matilda	Graciela "Grachi" Alonso	Television film	
2011–2013	Grachi	Graciela "Grachi" Alonso	Main role	
2012	Grachi: La Vida es Maravillosamente Musical	Graciela "Grachi" Alonso	Television film	
2014–2015	Tierra de reyes	Alma Gallardo and Verónica Saldívar	Main role	
2015–2016	¿Quién es quién?	Tania Sierra	Main role	
2016	Yo soy Franky	Luz Andrade	Main role	
2017	Vikki RPM	Roxana "Rox" Cruz	Main role	
2017	Milagros de Navidad	Marina	Episode: "Un Milagro en la Cocina"	
2018–2026	El Señor de los Cielos	Diana Ahumada	Main role (seasons 6–10)	
2018	The Inmate	Linda Morris	Main role	
2019	Club 57	Amelia Rivera	Main role	
2021	Malverde: El Santo Patrón	La China Navajas	Main role	
2024–2025	Sed de venganza	Fernanda Ríos / Regina Castaño	Main role	
2025-2026	Dinastía Casillas	Diana Ahumada	Main role	
2025	I'm Not Supposed To Be Here	Herself	Guest role	
2026	Mal de Amores	Helen	Recurring role	

== Stage ==
Year	Title	Role	Ref.
2005	Disney's Fantasia	Herself	
2008	El Diario de Ana Frank: Un Canto a la Vida	Anne Frank	
2012	Grachi: El Show en Vivo / Grachi: El Nuevo Show en Vivo	Graciela "Grachi" Alonso	
2015	Tacones Enanos	Victim of a bank robbery	

== Discography ==
=== Studio albums ===
Title	Details
Soñar No Cuesta Nada	Released: 23 April 2013; Label: Nickelodeon, Warner Music; Formats: CD, digital download, streaming

=== Soundtracks ===
Title	Details
El Diario de Ana Frank: Un Canto a la Vida	Released: 22 May 2008; Label: Ana Frank; Formats: CD (Note: Spain, Germany, Netherlands and Italy exclusive)
Grachi: La Vida es Maravillosamente Mágica	Released: 7 June 2011; Label: Nickelodeon, Universal Music, Virgin, Warner Music; Formats: CD, digital download, streaming
Grachi: La Vida es Maravillosamente Mágica (Volume 2)	Released: 11 April 2012; Label: Nickelodeon, Warner Music; Formats: CD, digital download, streaming
Grachi: La Vida es Maravillosamente Mágica (Volume 3)	Released: 4 March 2013; Label: Nickelodeon, Warner Music; Formats: Streaming
Yo soy Franky	Released: 12 May 2017; Label: Nickelodeon; Formats: CD, digital download, streaming
Vikki RPM	Released: 4 August 2017; Label: Nickelodeon; Formats: CD, digital download, streaming
Club 57	Released: 8 November 2019; Label: Nickelodeon, Sony Music; Formats: CD, digital download, streaming
La Usurpadora: The Musical	Released: 7 April 2023; Label: Universal Music, Virgin; Formats: Digital download, streaming

== Awards and nominations ==
Name of the award ceremony, year presented, category, nominee of the award, and the result of the nomination
Year	Award	Category	Nominee/work	Result	Ref.
2005	USA World Showcase	Most Promising – Children Singing Division	Isabella Castillo	Won	
2007	South Miami Middle Community School	Magnet Outstanding Performance	Isabella Castillo	Won	
2008	Gran Via Award	Best Revelation in a Musical	El Diario de Ana Frank – Un Canto a la Vida	Won	
2011	Kids' Choice Awards México	Favorite Character Female in a TV Series	Grachi	Won	
2011	Kids' Choice Awards Argentina	TV Revelation	Grachi	Nominated	
2012	Kids' Choice Awards	Favorite Latin Artist	Grachi	Won	
2012	Kids' Choice Awards México	Favorite Actress	Grachi	Nominated	
2012	Kids' Choice Awards Argentina	Favorite Actress	Grachi	Nominated	
2012	Meus Prêmios Nick Brazil	Favorite Actress	Grachi	Won	
2012	Meus Prêmios Nick Brazil	Favorite TV Character	Grachi	Won	
2013	Kids' Choice Awards U.S.	Favorite Latin Artist	Grachi	Won	
2013	Kids' Choice Awards México	Favorite Actress	Grachi	Nominated	
2013	Kids' Choice Awards México	Favorite Latin Soloist	Isabella Castillo	Nominated	
2013	Kids' Choice Awards Argentina	Favorite Latin Group or Soloist	Isabella Castillo	Won	
2013	Radio TKM Awards Argentina	Favorite Female Singer	Isabella Castillo	Nominated	
2013	Radio TKM Awards Argentina	Favorite Album	Soñar no Cuesta Nada	Nominated	
2013	Radio TKM Awards Argentina	Favorite Song	"Esta Canción"	Nominated	
2013	EXA Frost Awards México	Contribution to Music	Isabella Castillo	Won	
2017	Kids' Choice Awards México	Favorite Actress	Yo Soy Franky	Won	
2017	Kids' Choice Awards Colombia	Favorite Villain	Yo Soy Franky	Won	
2017	Kids' Choice Awards Argentina	Favorite Villain	Yo Soy Franky	Won	
2017	Kids' Choice Awards Argentina	Favorite Ship	with Leo Deluglio	Won	
2017	Kids' Choice Awards Argentina	Trendy Girl	Isabella Castillo	Nominated	
2022	PRODU Awards	Best Supporting Actress – Superseries or Telenovela	Malverde: El Santo Patrón	Nominated	
