= Mercedes Lambre =

Argentine actress, singer, dancer and model (born 1992)

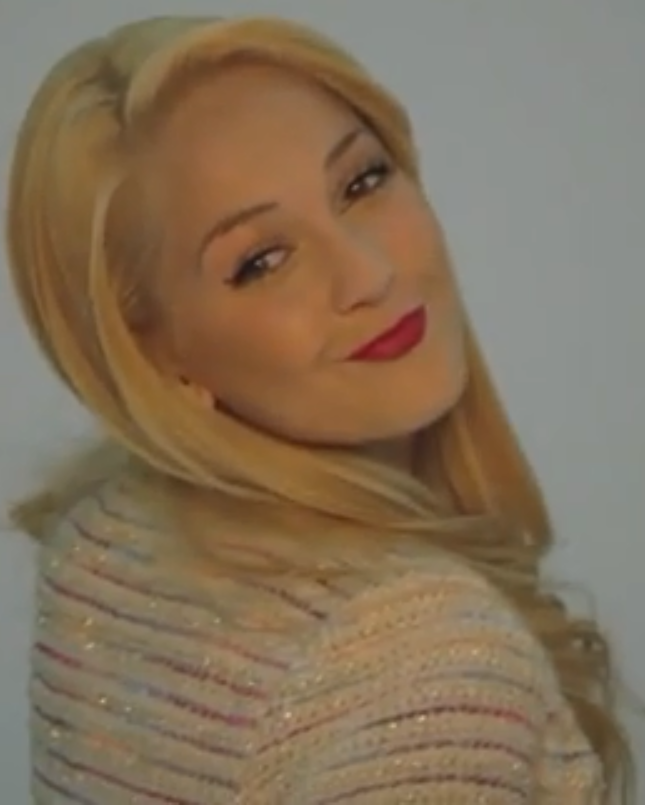
- Lambre in 2013
- Born: Mercedes Rodríguez Lambre; 5 October 1992 (age 32); La Plata, Argentina
- Other names: Mechi
- Occupation(s): Actress, singer, dancer, model
- Years active: 2011–present
- Children: 1
- Musical career
- Genres: Pop, Latin
- Instrument: Vocals
- Labels: Walt Disney; Onceloops Media; Warner Music Chile

Mercedes Rodríguez "Mechi" Lambre (Spanish pronunciation: [meɾˈseðes ˈlambɾe]; born 5 October 1992) is an Argentine actress, singer, dancer and model. She is known to international audiences for playing the debut role of Ludmilla in the Disney Channel original series Violetta.

== Life and career ==
Mercedes Lambre was born on 5 October 1992 in La Plata, Province of Buenos Aires, Argentina, where she trained in acting, singing and dancing. She studied theater with Lito Cruz, Gaston Marioni, Augusto Britez, and Alejandro Orduna and is currently studying with Monica Bruni. She also studied voice for four years with Professor Gabriel Giangrante CEFOA Academy in La Plata.

Regarding her training in dance, she majored in jazz dance, street dance and Spanish dances. She studied jazz dance with Juan Mallach for three years and with Gustavo Carrizo; street dance with Daniela Perez for two years in CICLUS and Spanish dances with Analia Flebes Sanchez for three years.

She began her career as a model for pay TV signal Utilísima being Violetta her first appearance in a fiction for television, where she plays Ludmila, the cool and glamorous girl of "Studio 21" which makes her the ideal girlfriend for "Leon" (Jorge Blanco). She starred in the second Violetta's music video, "Juntos somos más", which premiered on 1 May 2012 on Disney Channel.

== Filmography ==
Film and television roles
| Year | Title | Role | Notes |
|---|---|---|---|
| 2012–15 | Violetta | Ludmila Ferro | Main role, tv series |
| 2012 | Ludmila Cyberst@r | Ludmila Ferro | Lead role, web series |
| 2014 | Violetta: La emoción del concierto | Herself / Ludmila Ferro | Concert film |
| 2015 | Violetta Live en Montpellier | Herself / Ludmila Ferro | Concert film |
| 2015 | Violetta: The Journey | Herself / Ludmila Ferro | Documentary |
| 2016 | Tini: The Movie | Ludmila Ferro | Main role, film |
| 2017–19 | Heidi, bienvenida a casa | Emma Corradi | Main role, tv series |
| 2017 | 2017 Kids' Choice Awards Argentina | Herself / co-host | Tv award ceremony |
| 2022 | Solo Amor y Mil canciones | Herself | Special of Disney+ for 10 years of Violetta |

== Discography ==
=== As lead artist ===
List of singles as lead artist, with selected chart positions, showing year released
| Title | Year | Peaks | Album |
| Title | Year | ARG | Album |
|---|---|---|---|
| "Felicidad" | 2021 | — | Non-album singles |
| "Suerte" | 2021 | — | Non-album singles |
| "Te Invito (with Tommy Munoz) | 2021 | — | Non-album singles |
| "A mis 15" | 2022 | — | Non-album singles |
| "Músico Productor" | 2022 | — | Non-album singles |
"—" denotes a recording that did not chart or was not released in that territory.

==== As featured artist ====
| Title | Year | Album |
|---|---|---|
| "Un Largo Camino al Cielo" (Rodrigo featuring Michael Ronda, Cande Molfese, Lula RKT, Candela Diaz, Mechi Lambre, Fran MG, Luam, Sasha Ferro, Gonzalo Goette, Romina Malaspina, Pilar Pascual and Tomas Oranges) | 2021 | Non-album singles |
| "Amor?" (Elian featuring Mechi Lambre) | 2024 | Non-album singles |

==== Promotional singles ====
| Title | Year | Album |
|---|---|---|
| "Lugar Especial" (with Original Cast of WTF!) | 2022 | WTF! Con la Música a Otra Parte Temporada 2 |

== Awards and nominations ==
| Year | Award | Category | Nominated work | Result |
|---|---|---|---|---|
| 2012 | Kids' Choice Awards Argentina | Villano Favorito (Favorite Villain) | Violetta | Won |
| 2013 | Kids' Choice Awards Mexico | Villano Favorito (Favorite Villain) | Violetta | Nominated |
| 2013 | Kids' Choice Awards Argentina | Villano Favorito (Favorite Villain) | Violetta | Won |
| 2014 | Kids' Choice Awards Colombia | Villano Favorito (Favorite Villain) | Violetta | Won |
