= Malverde: El Santo Patrón =

American telenovela

- Created by: Luis Zelkowicz
- Written by: Carmina Narro; Iris Dubs; Juan Manuel Andrade; Luis Coimenares; Luis Zelkowicz
- Directed by: Miguel Varoni; Carlos Bolado; Sergio Osorio
- Creative directors: Natalia Sedano; Alberto Mejía
- Starring: Pedro Fernández
- Composer: Rodrigo Maurovich
- Country of origin: United States
- Original language: Spanish
- No. of seasons: 1
- No. of episodes: 80

Production
- Executive producers: David Posada; Karen Barroeta; Marcos Santana
- Cinematography: Andrés León Becker; Juan Pablo Ambris; Damián Aguilar
- Editors: Ramiro Pardo; Perla Martínez Legorreta
- Camera setup: Multi-camera
- Production company: Telemundo Global Studios

Original release
- Network: Telemundo
- Release: 28 September 2021 – 26 January 2022

Malverde: El Santo Patrón (English: Malverde: The Patron Saint) is an American biographical-drama television series based on the life of the Mexican bandit Jesús Malverde. Produced by Telemundo Global Studios, it aired on Telemundo from 28 September 2021 to 26 January 2022. The series stars Pedro Fernández as the title character.

== Plot ==
Set in 1910 and inspired by real-life events, the series follows Jesús Malverde, a young man from Sinaloa, Mexico that became a legendary figure and defender of the people. Malverde had a troubled childhood as an orphan where he experienced the trials of war, danger and love as he amassed unexpected power. Over time, he becomes a Robin Hood-like heroic figure, admired by women of all social classes. However, Jesús remains tormented by his unexpected feelings for his childhood love, Isabel. As federal authorities see increasing danger in Malverde's growing power during the early days of the Mexican Revolution, it will take more than love to keep at bay all those who seek to destroy the hero known to the faithful as "The Patron Saint".

== Cast ==
=== Main ===
- Pedro Fernández as Jesús Malverde
- Carolina Miranda as Isabel Aguilar
- Mark Tacher as Vicente del Río
- Alejandro Nones as Nazario Aguilar
- Luis Felipe Tovar as Herminio Quiñones
- Isabella Castillo as La China Navajas
- Ivonne Montero as Ángeles Serrano
- Sofía Castro as Lucrecia Luna
- Miguel de Miguel as Lisandro Luna
- Ramón Medina as Eleuterio Rivas
- Candela Márquez as Azalea Quiñones
- Alan Slim as Matías Galavis
- Mariaca Semprúm as La Güera Navarrete
- Claudio Roca as Secundino Aguilar
- Adrián Makala as John Reed
- María del Carmen Félix as Colonel Amalio Samán
- Humberto Elizondo as Father Hilario
- Salvador Sánchez as Ramón Aguilar
- Lukas Urkijo as Ignacio "Nacho" del Río
- Kenneth Lagunes as Chuyin

=== Recurring ===
- Mabel Cadena
- Héctor Kotsifakis as Lieutenant Gamboa
- Louis David Horne as Zamudio
- Emilio Guerrero as Governor Ramiro del Villar
- Isi Rojano as Tamal
- Antonio Monroi as Surem
- Arturo Beristain
- Juan Carlos Medellin
- Alejandro Navarrete as Pancho Villa

=== Guest stars ===
- Rafael Amaya as Teodoro Valenzuela

== Production ==
The production was announced in January 2020, with Fernando Colunga being confirmed in the lead role. On 8 February 2021, it was announced that Colunga had dropped out of the role. On 18 February 2021, Pedro Fernández was announced as Colunga's replacement. Filming took place from February 2021 to July 2021.

== Episodes ==
No.	Title	Original release date	U.S. viewers (millions)
1	"Malverde, ladrón de caminos"	28 September 2021	1.09
Jesús Malverde is a bandit who seeks justice for the execution of his father, also in the distribution of land and food for the people. Herminio Quiñones orders to pursue him.
2	"Las vueltas del poder"	29 September 2021	1.15
Malverde complains to the governor for giving privileges, without measuring the consequences. Nazario, his imprisoned brother, waits for his ransom. Quiñones receives a couple of surprises.
3	"La guerra es otra"	30 September 2021	1.06
The governor has announcements to make to the people of San Blas de Baca, from now on, the battlefront changes for Malverde. Isabel can't hide a big smile when she thinks of Malverde.
4	"Una cita a solas"	1 October 2021	0.97
Isabel and Malverde see each other secretly, he does the math and asks her to tell him if Nacho is his son. Herminio Quiñones clears the path of the one who hinders him the most.
5	"Revuelta en San Blas"	4 October 2021	1.05
Malverde declares war on the federals to defend his people and opens Isabel's eyes. The only one who benefits from the governor's death is Herminio Quiñones.
6	"La llave de la libertad"	5 October 2021	0.90
To find out who he is spying on, the government or the revolution, Malverde confronts Matías and subdues Gamboa to achieve his goal.
7	"Jugadas estratégicas"	6 October 2021	0.97
The governor's widow delays the transfer of her husband's remains, she waits for the arrival of the new authorities and that worries Quiñones. Isabel surprises Vicente.
8	"Un héroe para la causa"	7 October 2021	1.06
John Reed is an envoy of Pancho Villa and has a message for Malverde. Lisandro Luna steps in as the new army chief to straighten things out in San Blas.
9	"El dinero mueve montañas"	8 October 2021	0.89
Josefina asks to speak alone with Lisandro Luna and Quiñones is furious. The gold is used by the governor's widow to give a reward and by the authorities to rule out a hypothesis.
10	"Medir las aguas"	11 October 2021	0.81
Malverde and his men hold up a bank. Lisandro Luna is there to stop them. A small part of the loot is not the only thing they are interested in: it is the welcome to the head of the army.
11	"Las hilachas del amor"	12 October 2021	0.98
A mixture of jealousy and complaints explodes in Vicente and Isabel's faces. Vicente can't take it anymore and the situation him to spend the night away from home. Isabel sends a letter to Malverde.
12	"Vivir una mentira"	14 October 2021	0.95
Isabel knows how she feels, Malverde is her rebelliousness, her freedom and he makes her a proposal, even though he knows she is a married woman with a son, a child he insists on saying is his.
13	"Matrimonio contra las cuerdas"	15 October 2021	0.83
A new argument between Isabel and Vicente makes clear an infidelity and a secret. There are reasons to reveal the secret before it is too late.
14	"Malverde y sus dos frentes"	18 October 2021	1.00
In war, Malverde does not dare to make decisions yet, he does not want to be a politician, but in love he is very clear. Teo Valenzuela arrives in town and makes his presence felt.
15	"Con mujer ajena"	19 October 2021	0.95
Valentina, General Villa's wife, knows that she may be just one more women of the famous Malverde. The revolution and its purpose is not the only reason to discuss differences.
16	"El cazarrecompensas"	20 October 2021	0.80
Teo Valenzuela does not count on Ángeles for anything, least of all to find Malverde. Although Ángeles suspects what Teo is looking for, she is reluctant to believe that he is interested in seeing Malverde for business.
17	"Van por el oro"	21 October 2021	0.88
Malverde and Nazario execute a raid and get ahead of Fierro, one of Villa's men. More than wealth, they receive a threat for crossing a military objective of the Revolution.
18	"La bota en el hormiguero"	22 October 2021	0.82
Lizandro Luna's troops start with the mission: the objective is the indigenous settlement, Yoreme, the place where Jesús Malverde grew up, to bring him out of hiding.
19	"Retumba la noticia"	25 October 2021	0.90
Malverde is an obsession for Lizandro Luna and the pressure reaches the ears of the Patron Saint, but the colonel does not have Jesus' good sense of smell to know when and how to fight.
20	"Apariciones"	26 October 2021	0.86
The Federal's make an incredible decision. Malverde reads human nature, manages emotions and makes the miracle possible.
21	"Un favor no es una traición"	27 October 2021	0.68
Malverde puts Gamboa on the spot, thanks him for preventing the Federal's from mistreating the indigenous people and he responds with the points on the table. Jesús warns of the danger Nacho is in.
22	"Luces y sombras"	28 October 2021	0.76
Quiñones and Vicente del Río confirm that progress has arrived; others, embezzlement. Malverde arrives to cure Ramón, what he finds is worse than a simple cough. Isabel follows instructions.
23	"Un Don Juan descarado"	29 October 2021	0.69
Isabel already knows the truth and when she confronts Malverde, he admits it and blames her for not letting go of her heart and remaining tied to someone she does not love.
24	"Circula un panfleto"	1 November 2021	0.81
A smear campaign against Quiñones gets the whole town talking. Lizandro Luna and Gamboa must find out who is behind it and what printing press they counted on.
25	"Detrás del complot"	2 November 2021	0.73
With the suspect's name in hand, Lizandro Luna arrives surprisingly at the school. Colonel Samán hides and worries about the military man's good sense of smell. Azalea and Isabel draw conclusions.
26	"Juntos, pero no revueltos"	3 November 2021	0.76
Malverde has a hostage that Pancho Villa wants to execute to set an example. Samán is impressed.
27	"El peor castigo, la burla"	4 November 2021	0.80
Eleuterio, Quiñones' right-hand man, pays the consequences for messing with a minor. Malverde returns him in the worst conditions and with a message hanging around his neck for his boss.
28	"Peligro inminente"	5 November 2021	0.65
Eleuterio's revenge against the Aguilar family could be deadly. Malverde takes action and suggests a solution.
29	"Ni con Dios ni con el diablo"	8 November 2021	0.62
Malverde is with Lucrecia and is surprised by Lizandro Luna, aiming at his head; with the target in his sights, he demands that he put on handcuffs.
30	"Una vida a cambio de muchas"	9 November 2021	0.70
A plan emerges in which Malverde's people turn him over to the authorities and collect the reward. Isabel confesses that she was part of a lie.
31	"Premoniciones"	10 November 2021	0.71
Malverde goes alone to the indigenous settlements and has a vision that death is near.
32	"Un matón anda suelto"	11 November 2021	0.68
Malverde is desperate to know where Surem is, he does his best to get information. The silence of the people frightens Malverde. Isabel makes an unexpected announcement.
33	"Poderes milagrosos"	12 November 2021	0.81
Malverde is blamed for the bank robbery and the deaths, but he still has to come out of hiding, run to execute a mission and save a life. Ramon dusts off a gun at Jesus' request.
34	"Orden presidencial"	15 November 2021	0.88
Power goes to Quiñones' head, while Malverde does his thing in the hospital. Malverde has accomplices, such as the doctor, who also witnesses the miracle.
35	"Una cómplice encantadora"	17 November 2021	0.84
Malverde seeks refuge with Azalea to hide Surem from the Federales, but she displeases him by asking him to make a lie come true. Samán confronts La China.
36	"El trato"	18 November 2021	0.76
Lizandro Luna could charge La China with robbery and murder, but if she betrays Malverde she has a lot to gain. A deadly trap is set up to prevent La China from going to trial.
37	"Salir del agujero"	19 November 2021	0.81
A group of accomplices is woven in Quiñones' mansion to escape from his clutches and get La China out of the command. Samán and Malverde confront each other over the strategy to be followed.
38	"La guerra por Isabel"	22 November 2021	0.83
With a few drinks too many, Vicente threatens to kill his rival. Isabel admits her mistakes and Malverde justifies his actions. Isabel runs out of excuses for not sleeping with her husband.
39	"Con el mazo dando"	23 November 2021	0.86
An incredible opportunity arrives for Vicente. Quiñones celebrates the coincidence, Malverde is the common target. Isabel knows what Vicente and Quiñones are up to.
40	"Todo por una mujer"	24 November 2021	0.82
Samán advances with his men in the name of the revolution. Reed thinks Samán is exaggerating, he knows it is not an order from Villa. Malverde surprises Samán, he set the stage to teach him a lesson.
41	"Secuestro para sanar"	26 November 2021	0.73
The news brought by John Reed sets the record straight. San Blas wants progress, but change cannot cost lives. Malverde has another priority, Secundino requires his attention.
42	"Desgarrador"	29 November 2021	0.82
43	"Un valioso rehén"	30 November 2021	0.88
44	"Ambición desmedida"	1 December 2021	0.83
45	"Una increíble visión"	2 December 2021	0.73
46	"Las sospechas de Isabel"	3 December 2021	0.86
47	"Ojo por ojo"	6 December 2021	N/A
48	"Deseo sanguinario"	7 December 2021	0.83
49	"Los milagros existen"	8 December 2021	0.86
50	"Seducción que enmudece"	9 December 2021	0.86
51	"Cambio de ruta"	10 December 2021	0.77
52	"Déjalo"	13 December 2021	0.74
53	"Huele a revancha"	14 December 2021	0.92
54	"Tramposos"	15 December 2021	0.90
55	"Una propuesta revolucionaria"	16 December 2021	0.87
56	"Dobles intenciones"	17 December 2021	0.81
57	"Legítimo ladrón"	20 December 2021	0.77
58	"Mentiras piadosas"	21 December 2021	0.75
59	"Con un pie en el acelerador"	22 December 2021	0.79
60	"Aliado o traidor"	27 December 2021	N/A
61	"Lo peor está por venir"	28 December 2021	N/A
62	"Reto al destino"	29 December 2021	N/A
63	"Una cara travesura"	3 January 2022	0.73
64	"A la caza de Malverde"	4 January 2022	0.82
65	"Inexplicable"	5 January 2022	0.80
66	"Hecha pedazos"	6 January 2022	N/A
67	"El siguiente golpe"	7 January 2022	N/A
68	"Pegar donde más duele"	10 January 2022	0.80
69	"Prueba de fuego"	11 January 2022	0.84
70	"Veneno"	12 January 2022	0.70
71	"Visita relámpago"	13 January 2022	0.79
72	"Salida forzosa"	14 January 2022	0.78
73	"Medidas extremas"	17 January 2022	0.80
74	"Mujer de armas tomar"	18 January 2022	N/A
75	"Detrás de la fortuna"	19 January 2022	N/A
76	"La boda pende de un hilo"	20 January 2022	N/A
77	"De incógnito"	21 January 2022	0.91
78	"Sacrificios"	24 January 2022	0.85
79	"Mano dura"	25 January 2022	0.92
80	"El canje del Santo Patrón"	26 January 2022	1.06

== Reception ==
=== Ratings ===
Viewership and ratings per season of Malverde: El Santo Patrón
Season	Timeslot (ET)	Episodes	First aired		Last aired		Avg. viewers (millions)
Season	Timeslot (ET)	Episodes	Date	Viewers (millions)	Date	Viewers (millions)	Avg. viewers (millions)
1	Mon–Fri 10:00 p.m.	71 (Note: Should reflect the number of episodes that contribute to the average given in the last column.)	28 September 2021	1.09	26 January 2022	1.06	0.84

=== Awards and nominations ===
Year	Award	Category	Nominated	Result	Ref
2022	International Emmy Award	Best Non-English Language U.S. Primetime Program	Malverde: El Santo Patrón	Nominated	
2022	Produ Awards	Best Superseries	Malverde: El Santo Patrón	Nominated	
2022	Produ Awards	Best Music Theme - Superseries or Telenovela	Malverde: El Santo Patrón	Won	
2022	Produ Awards	Best Lead Actress - Superseries or Telenovela	Carolina Miranda	Nominated	
2022	Produ Awards	Best Lead Actor - Superseries or Telenovela	Pedro Fernández	Nominated	
2022	Produ Awards	Best Supporting Actress - Superseries or Telenovela	Isabella Castillo	Nominated	
2022	Produ Awards	Best Supporting Actor - Superseries or Telenovela	Luis Felipe Tovar	Nominated	
2022	Produ Awards	Best Supporting Actor - Superseries or Telenovela	Mark Tacher	Nominated	
2022	Produ Awards	Best Supporting Actress - Series	Candela Márquez	Nominated	
2022	Produ Awards	Best Directing - Superseries or Telenovela	Miguel Varoni, Carlos Bolado, and Sergio Osorio	Nominated	
2022	Produ Awards	Best Fiction Production - Superseries or Telenovela	Karen Barroeta, Marcos Santana, and David Posada	Nominated	
2022	Produ Awards	Best Creative Directing	Natalia Sedano, Valeria Fiñana, and Gloria Carrasco	Nominated	
2022	Produ Awards	Best Music Composer	Pieter Schlosser	Nominated	
2022	Produ Awards	Best Period Recreation	Natalia Sedano, Valeria Fiñana, Gloria Carrasco, and Julio Suárez	Nominated	
