= Marcelo, Marmelo, Martelo (book) =

- Author: Ruth Rocha
- Illustrator: Adalberto Cornavaca
- Language: Portuguese
- Genre: Children's
- Publisher: Salamandra
- Publication date: 1976
- Publication place: Brazil
- Pages: 60
- ISBN: 8528100715

Marcelo, Marmelo, Martelo is a children's book by the Brazilian writer Ruth Rocha and illustrated by Adalberto Cornavaca, it was originally released in 1976 by Salamandra. There are more than 55 editions making it a classic used in schools all over Brazil.

In 2011, Salamandra launched the reformulated book, illustrated by Mariana Massarani, which contains 64 pages.

== Description ==
This book shows everyday situations in a way that seeks to be simple and colorful. The characters in the three stories that make up this book are children who live in urban areas. They resolve their impasses with cleverness and vivacity; Marcelo creates new words, Teresinha and Gabriela discover identity in difference and Carlos Alberto understands the importance of friendship.

== Adaptations ==
In 2022, Marcelo, Marmelo, Martelo was adapted into a television series with the same title produced by VIS and in partnership with Coiote with 13 episodes with the end of recording in September. The series premiered on the Paramount+ streaming service on July 8, 2023, along with Nickelodeon Brazil.
