= Ruth Rocha =

Brazilian children's writer (born 1931)

Ruth Machado Lousada Rocha (born March 2, 1931), most known as Ruth Rocha is a Brazilian writer of children's books. Together with Lygia Bojunga, Ana Maria Machado and Eva Furnari she is one of the leading exponents of the new wave of Brazilian children's literature. Rocha graduated in political sociology at the University of São Paulo and postgraduated in Educational Orientation in the Pontifical Catholic University of São Paulo. She became a member of the Paulista Academy of Arts since October 25, 2007, occupying the chair 38.

== Work ==
She debuted in the literary field in 1967, writing articles for several magazines on education, among them Cláudia. In 1976, she published her first book entitled Palavras Muitas Palavras .

Her current work has more than 130 published titles, 500 editions and translations to over 25 languages; also, it has sold about 17.5 million copies in Brazil and 2.5 million copies overseas. One of her best known works is Marcelo, Marmelo, Martelo, (translated to English as Marcelo, Martello, Marshmallow), which has sold more than two million copies.

== Honors and Prizes ==
In 1998 she was honored by former President Fernando Henrique Cardoso with the Order of Cultural Merit from the Ministry of Culture of Brazil. In 2002 she was elected as a member of PEN CLUB - World Association of Writers in Rio de Janeiro. That same year, her book Escrever e Criar received the Jabuti Prize of Literature.

== Some of her published works ==
- Marcelo, Marmelo, Martelo
- O Reizinho Mandão
- SapoViraReiViraSapo, ou a volta do Reizinho Mandão
- Catapimba
- Meus Lápis de Cor São Só Meus
- Meu Irmãozinho Me Atrapalha
- A Menina que Não Era Maluquinha
- O Menino que Quase Virou Cachorro
- Borba, o Gato
- Escolinha do Mar
- Faz Muito Tempo
- O Que os Olhos Não Vêem
- Procurando Firme
- Gabriela e a Titia
- Pra Vencer Certas Pessoas
- Historinhas Malcriadas
- A Arca de Noé
- As Coisas que a Gente Fala
- Bom Dia, Todas as Cores!
- Como se Fosse Dinheiro
- Davi Ataca Outra Vez
- Este Admirável Mundo Louco
- Faca Sem Ponta Galinha Sem Pé
- Romeu e Julieta
