= Food Hunters =

- Genre: Reality show
- Created by: Lorena Garcia
- Presented by: Lorena Garcia
- Original language: Spanish
- No. of seasons: 1
- No. of episodes: 12

Production
- Producer: Cinemat Inc.
- Production location: Hispanic America
- Cinematography: Jesus Ivan Rodriguez

Original release
- Network: Nickelodeon Latin America
- Release: October 16, 2016 – January 15, 2017

Food Hunters is an American cooking competition television series that aired on Nickelodeon Latin America. It premiered on Sunday, October 16, 2016 in Latin America, and concluded on January 15, 2017. The project began filming in May. This program features 12 episodes of 60 minutes and is produced in collaboration with Chef Lorena Garcia and Cinemat Inc. for Nickelodeon Latin America.

== Format ==
Children between the ages of 8 and 13 can apply to become a contestant on the series. Four teams of two contestants each will compete in an outside obstacle race to collect the required ingredients. The first three teams to complete the outdoor challenge will use the ingredients collected and their culinary skills against their peers. They will compete against the clock and under the direction of Venezuelan chef Lorena Garcia, author and owner of several restaurants, who will evaluate and decide the winner of each episode.

The winner wins a medal and a scholarship to continue their culinary education.

== List of episodes ==
No. in series	Original title	English title	Original air date	Production Code
1	Como leche para mantequilla	Like milk for butter	October 16, 2016	101
2	El ingrediente misterioso	The mysterious ingredient	October 23, 2016	102
3	¡Viva la Pasta!	Long Live the Pasta!	October 30, 2016	103
4	¿La gallina o el huevo?	The hen or the egg?	November 6, 2016	104
5	Rica Ricota	Rich Ricota	November 13, 2016	105
6	Maíz Movedizo	Restless Maize	November 20, 2016	106
7	Papa y puntería	Potato and aim	November 27, 2016	107
8	Lluvia de mangos	Mango rain	December 4, 2016	108
9	Esqui granjero	Farmer skiing	December 11, 2016	109
10	Feliz como una lombriz	Happy like a worm	December 18, 2016	110
11	Veloz como el arroz	Fast as Rice	January 8, 2017	111
12	La gran final de Food Hunters	The Food Hunters Grand Final	January 15, 2017	112

== Contestants ==
=== Episode 1 ===
Contestant	Age	Information
(Argentina) Sofia	13	Winner Purple Team
(Argentina) Milenka	12	Finalist Purple Team
(Mexico) Nadia	12	Finalists; Blue Team
(Colombia) Valentina	11	Finalists; Blue Team
(Venezuela) Kevin	13	Finalists; Yellow Team
(Colombia) Luis	12	Finalists; Yellow Team
(Mexico) Luisa	13	Removed; Red Team
(Venezuela) Santiago	13	Removed; Red Team

=== Episode 2 ===
Contestant	Age	Information
(Mexico) Luis	11	Winner Purple Team
(Mexico) Sofía	11	Finalist Purple Team
(Mexico) Valentina	12	Finalists; Red Team
(Colombia) Juan Martín	13	Finalists; Red Team
(Mexico) Tanya	12	Finalists; Yellow Team
(Colombia) Daniela	10	Finalists; Yellow Team
(Colombia) Giancarlo	13	Removed; Blue Team
(Colombia) Brandon	11	Removed; Blue Team

=== Episode 3 ===
Contestant	Age	Information
(Colombia) José Daniel	13	Winner Purple Team
(Argentina) Milena	12	Finalist Purple Team
(Argentina) Agustín	10	Finalists; Blue Team
(Argentina) Emilia	12	Finalists; Blue Team
(Colombia) Isabella	10	Finalists; Yellow Team
(Colombia) Juan	12	Finalists; Yellow Team
(Mexico) Elisa	11	Removed; Red Team
(Venezuela) Enrique	13	Removed; Red Team

=== Episode 4 ===
Contestant	Age	Information
(Colombia) Gabriela	11	Winner Purple Team
(Mexico) Paulina	9	Finalist Purple Team
(Argentina) Pedro	10	Finalists; Blue Team
(Guatemala) Luis	11	Finalists; Blue Team
(Mexico) Santiago	9	Finalists; Red Team
(Argentina) Salvatore	11	Finalists; Red Team
(Colombia) Paula	11	Removed; Yellow Team
(Ecuador) Charlotte	10	Removed; Yellow Team

=== Episode 5 ===
Contestant	Age	Information
(Colombia) Santiago	13	Winner; Yellow Team
(Colombia) Antonia	13	Finalist; Yellow Team
(Argentina) Uziel	13	Finalists; Blue Team
(Colombia) Esther	13	Finalists; Blue Team
(Chile) Victoria	12	Finalists; Red Team
(Venezuela) Andrés	11	Finalists; Red Team
(Mexico) Luka	11	Removed; Purple Team
(Mexico) Tania	13	Removed; Purple Team

=== Episode 6 ===
Contestant	Age	Information
(Ecuador) María Julia	12	Winner Purple Team
(Venezuela) Eduardo	10	Finalist Purple Team
(Chile) Daniela	14	Finalists; Blue Team
(Mexico) Haquin	12	Finalists; Blue Team
(Colombia) Nicholas	12	Finalists; Yellow Team
(Mexico) Sophie	12	Finalists; Yellow Team
(Argentina) Lucas	12	Removed; Red Team
(Colombia) Victoria	12	Removed; Red Team

=== Episode 7 ===
Contestant	Age	Information
(Guatemala) Javier	11	Winner Yellow Team
(Colombia) Mariana	10	Finalist; Yellow Team
(Colombia) María José	11	Finalists; Blue Team
(Colombia) Juan Miguel	8	Finalists; Blue Team
(Mexico) Santiago	12	Finalists; Red Team
(Mexico) Aura	9	Finalists; Red Team
(Venezuela) Daniel	10	Removed; Purple Team
(Venezuela) Michelle	10	Removed; Purple Team

=== Episode 8 ===
Contestant	Age	Information
(Mexico) Aranza	9	Winner; Yellow Team
(Ecuador) María Paz	12	Finalist; Yellow Team
(Colombia) Mariana	8	Finalists; Purple Team
(Chile) Camila	11	Finalists; Purple Team
(Mexico) Natalia	10	Finalists; Red Team
(Mexico) Aura	9	Finalists; Red Team
(Colombia) Maikol	8	Removed; Blue Team
(Venezuela) Nicolas	10	Removed; Blue Team

=== Episode 9 ===
Contestant	Age	Information
(Mexico) Renatta	9	Winner Purple Team
(Mexico) Ximena	11	Finalist Purple Team
(Argentina) Delfina	11	Finalists; Blue Team
(Venezuela) Leyla	9	Finalists; Blue Team
(Colombia) Paula	12	Finalists; Yellow Team
(Mexico) Ana Victoria	10	Finalists; Yellow Team
(Argentina) Ema	11	Removed; Red Team
(Mexico) Paulina	11	Removed; Red Team

=== Episode 10 ===
Contestant	Age	Information
(Mexico) Camila	9	Winner; Red Team
(Colombia) Samuel	9	Finalist; Red Team
(Colombia) Ivanna	11	Finalists; Purple Team
(Argentina) Morena	9	Finalists; Purple Team
(Guatemala) José Joaquín	10	Finalists; Yellow Team
(Mexico) André	10	Finalists; Yellow Team
(Mexico) Silvana	11	Removed; Blue Team
(Argentina) Salvador	10	Removed; Blue Team

=== Episode 11 ===
Contestant	Age	Information
(Argentina) Lara	13	Winner; Blue Team
(Ecuador) Matias	12	Finalist; Blue Team
(Argentina) Mateo	10	Finalists; Yellow Team
(Chile) Grace	10	Finalists; Yellow Team
(Venezuela) Sebastian	12	Finalists; Purple Team
(Colombia) Lilian	11	Finalists; Purple Team
(Honduras) Ángel	12	Removed; Red Team
(Venezuela) Daniela	9	Removed; Red Team
