= Soñar no cuesta nada (album) =

Studio album by Isabella Castillo
- Released: April 23, 2013
- Genre: Latin pop
- Length: 36:57
- Language: Spanish, English
- Label: Warner Music Latina
- Producer: Martín Chan

Singles from Soñar no cuesta nada
- 1. "Soñar no cuesta nada" Released: March 18, 2013

Soñar no cuesta nada (lit. Dreaming Costs Nothing) is the debut studio album by Cuban-American singer Isabella Castillo. It was released on April 23, 2013, by Warner Music Latina.

== Concept ==
On April 16, 2012, Isabella Castillo announced she was choosing the songs, some written and composed by her, for her first solo album, which would be released that fall first in Spanish and then in English; she signed a record deal with Warner Music Latina on February 27, 2013.

The album, titled Soñar no Cuesta Nada, is produced by Martín Chan, was recorded in Miami and produced in three months. Castillo defined it "a disc of transition. There are songs from Grachi, which are for children. But there are also ballads, for adults. [...] It's rather a disc of transition, which tries to mix the two audiences avoiding me to concentrate on just one". The songs are eleven, nine of which were written by Isabella Castillo. "Soñar no cuesta nada" was inspired by a fan, who told the singer that she liked a boy, but he ignored her; "No me importa" was written during a bout of jealousy; "Alma en dos" and "Me enamoré" are also part of the soundtrack of the third season of Grachi: the first was composed thinking about the love story between Grachi, Axel and Daniel, while the second when the singer was fourteen; "Pertenezco a ti" was originally in English and Castillo adapted the lyrics in Spanish; "Lágrimas" is a rock remix of the song that was part of the soundtrack of the second season of Grachi; "El momento" was composed thinking that no one should stop being himself to be with another person; "Esta canción" wasn't initially planned, but occurred while the singer was taking a shower and Warner approved it.

== Release, music videos and promotion ==
On March 18, 2013, the single "Soñar no cuesta nada" was released, and was used as closing theme for the last ten episodes of the third season of Grachi from April 26 to May 10. On April 15, after a preview three days before, the videoclip for the song was released: recorded at the beginning of the month at LMNT Contemporary Arts in Miami, directed by Rafael E. Rodríguez and produced by Yare Films, it stars the Hungarian model Nordi Novak as male lead. The full album was released on April 23. On August 6, the music video for "Esta canción" was filmed in Puerto Madero, Buenos Aires, directed by Cecilia Atán, which aired on television on September 4 and landed on MTV Latinoamérica the next day.

Isabella Castillo held several fan meetings through Latin America to promote the album: on April 30 and July 18 in Mexico City, on May 8 in Buenos Aires, on July 15 in Monterrey, and on August 11 in Santiago. She then made a promotional tour in Argentina from August 13 to August 23, passing through Mendoza, Neuquén, Rosario, Pilar, Trelew, Morón, and Lomas de Zamora.

A concert tour was expected in October, but got cancelled.

== Track listing ==
※ Bolded tracks identify singles from the album.

| No. | Title | Lyrics | Length |
|---|---|---|---|
| 1. | "**Soñar no Cuesta Nada**" | Isabella Castillo | 2:52 |
| 2. | "No Me Importa" | Isabella Castillo | 3:17 |
| 3. | "Ven a Mi Casa" | Martín Chan | 3:11 |
| 4. | "Alma en Dos" | Isabella Castillo | 3:40 |
| 5. | "Me Enamoré" | Isabella Castillo | 3:44 |
| 6. | "Te Necesito Badly" | Isabella Castillo | 3:18 |
| 7. | "Pertenezco a Ti" | Isabella Castillo | 2:54 |
| 8. | "Lágrimas" | Martín Chan | 3:13 |
| 9. | "El Momento" | Isabella Castillo | 3:21 |
| 10. | "Esta Canción" | Isabella Castillo | 3:26 |
| 11. | "Corazón de Oro" | Isabella Castillo | 4:01 |
| Total length: | | | 36:57 |

== Charts ==
Soñar no Cuesta Nada (single)

| Chart | Peak position |
|---|---|
| Mexican Airplay | 15 |

== Release history ==
| Country | Date | Format | Label |
|---|---|---|---|
| Latin America | April 23, 2013 | CD, digital download | Warner Music Latina |
| Worldwide | April 23, 2013 | Digital download | Warner Music Latina |
| Brasil | June 3, 2013 | CD, digital download | Warner Music Latina |

== Accolades ==
| Year | Award | Category | Result |
|---|---|---|---|
| Premios TKM | CD TKM | Soñar no Cuesta Nada | Nominated |
| Premios TKM | Song TKM | "Esta canción" | Nominated |

== Tour ==
From May 8, til August 23, 2013, Castillo offered concerts in Argentina, Mexico and Chile.

| Country | City | Venue | Date | Attendance |
|---|---|---|---|---|
| Argentina | Buenos Aires | Yenny Unicenter | May 8, 2013 | 3,300/3,300 |
| Mexico | Monterrey | Arena Monterrey | July 16, 2013 | 17,600/17,600 |
| Chile | Santiago | KidZania | August 11, 2013 | 1,500/1,500 |
