= Papaya Bull =

- Genre: Animated cartoon
- Created by: Ricardo Peres; Rodrigo Eller; Andréa Midori Simão; Jotagá Crema; Tiago Mello
- Directed by: Fernando Finamore; Rodrigo Eller
- Country of origin: Brazil
- Original language: Brazilian Portuguese
- No. of seasons: 1
- No. of episodes: 13 (26 segments)

Production
- Executive producer: Tiago Mello
- Producer: Mari Nunes
- Production companies: Nickelodeon Brazil; Boutique Filmes; Birdo Studio

Original release
- Network: Nickelodeon Brazil
- Release: October 2, 2017 – March 31, 2018

Papaya Bull is a Brazilian animated cartoon series that aired on Nickelodeon Brazil is showing. The series is a co-production of Boutique Filmes, Nickelodeon and NBCUniversal International Networks. Produced by Birdo Studio and 52 Animation Studio.

Papaya Bull has 13 episodes and 26 segments, the show debuted on 2 October 2017 in Brazil on Nickelodeon Brazil, and premiered in Latin America on 5 May 2018 on the Latin American Nickelodeon channel.

Inspired by the folklore of the state of Santa Catarina, with characters with names of beaches of the state capital, Florianópolis, the animation Papaya Bull debuted on October 2, 2017, in its native country, through Nickelodeon Brazil. The idea of using the papaya steer as the basis for the story was by Ricardo Peres and Rodrigo Eller, 52 Animation Studio.

== Synopsis ==
The story takes place on the island of Papaya, where each child receives an ox as soon as it is born, the ox that will be his best friend and protector for life. Everyone has their least Cacupé, who arrived mysteriously on the island and ended up staying with Socrates, a neurotic ox that was left over. Now the pair will challenge the customs of Papaya Island.

== Characters ==
- Cacupé
- Hermano
- Joaquina
- Guri
- Sócrates
- Floriano
- Dani

== Episodes ==
Episode	Segment	Original Brazilian Title	Translated Title	Original Premiere
1	1	Ou Não	Or not	2 October 2017
1	2	Os Caçadores da Bernúncia Perdida	The Hunters of Lost Belief	2 October 2017
2	3	Multigorra	Multicap	9 October 2017
2	4	Bubble Date	Bubble Date	9 October 2017
3	5	Carrapatos me Mordam	Ticks Bite Me	16 October 2017
3	6	Irruminação	Irrumination	16 October 2017
4	7	Barrigón de Aluguel	Belly of Rent	23 October 2017
4	8	Encanto da Sereia	Mermaid Charm	23 October 2017
5	9	Lavando a Alma	Washing the Soul	30 October 2017
5	10	Bolha Vs. Bolha	Bubble Vs. Bubble	30 October 2017
6	11	Cinco Meias Verdades sobre a Mentira	Five Half-Truths About Lying	6 November 2017
6	12	O Artista Está Presente	The Artist Is Present	6 November 2017
7	13	O Tempo não Para - Parte 1	Time doesn't Stop - Part 1	9 December 2017
7	14	O Tempo não Para - Parte 2	Time doesn't Stop - Part 2	9 December 2017
8	15	A Cigarra e o Boi	The Cicada and the Ox	16 December 2017
8	16	Problemas de Leitura	Reading Problems	16 December 2017
9	17	Title has not yet been revealed		3 March 2018
9	18	Title has not yet been revealed		3 March 2018
10	19	Title has not yet been revealed		10 March 2018
10	20	Title has not yet been revealed		10 March 2018
11	21	Title has not yet been revealed		17 March 2018
11	22	Title has not yet been revealed		17 March 2018
12	23	Title has not yet been revealed		24 March 2018
12	24	Title has not yet been revealed		24 March 2018
13	25	Title has not yet been revealed		31 March 2018
13	26	Title has not yet been revealed		31 March 2018
