= Teatro Coliseo =

Theatre in Buenos Aires

Coordinates: 34.5966°S 58.3833°W

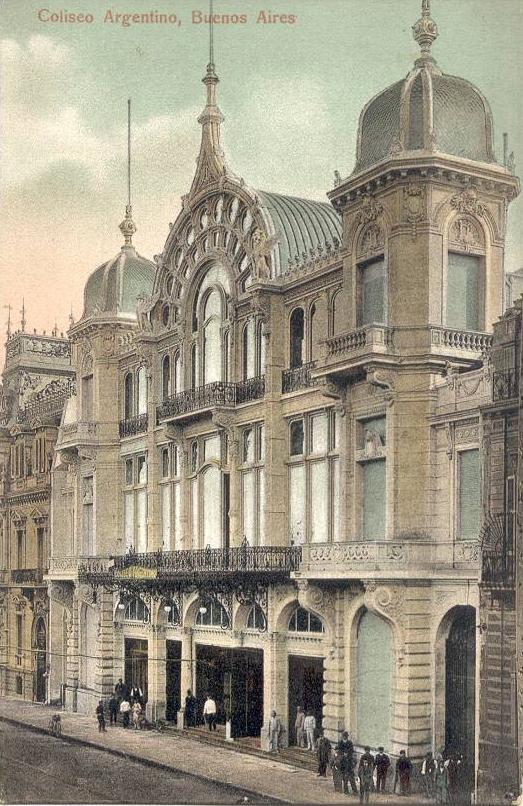
The first theatre

The Teatro Coliseo is a theatre in Retiro neighbourhood in Buenos Aires, Argentina which opened on July 8, 1905.

== History ==
The Coliseum Theatre was opened in 1905 by the British clown Frank Brown, of great importance in the origins of the Creole circus and theater in Argentina, as a circus hall. On August 27, 1920 from the terrace of the same Enrique Telémaco Susini made one of the first radio broadcasts in history, inaugurating there the LOR Radio Argentina. The theater was closed in 1937, and its building bought by the Italian government, designed some projects for its transformation into a cultural center, where exhibitions and events were held. However, the ideas were cut short by the outbreak of World War II, the building was partially demolished in 1938, and the ruins were vacant lot behind a wall. In the following years, the Italian government decided to build a new building to house part of the Consulate General of his country in Buenos Aires, preserving the theater.

In 1961 was inaugurated the current theater with the representation of The Saint of Bleecker Street of Giancarlo Menotti by the company's Teatro Argentino of La Plata.

The architects Mario Bigongiari and Maurizio Mazzocchi and brothers Luis and Alberto Morea were given charge of remodeling the room and the building of the Buenos Aires Coliseum, with the transfer of the Italian Consulate and installation of the Italian Institute of Culture in the theater building.

== Principal concerts ==
- Tate McRae
- Level 42
- Men at Work
- Tears For Fears
- Richard Clayderman
- Cat Power
- Fish
- Maceo Parker
- Tony Bennett
- Dizzy Gillespie
- Yehudi Menuhin
- Morcheeba
- Dido
- Dee Dee Bridgewater
- The Cardigans

== Recordings ==
- On December 26, 1981 the Argentine band Serú Girán recorded Yo no quiero volverme tan loco.
- In 1999, the Argentine singer, David Lebon, recorded En vivo, en el Teatro Coliseo.
- The humour/music show Les Luthiers, recordings Mastropiero que nunca and Muchas gracias de nada album in the teatre.

== Gallery ==
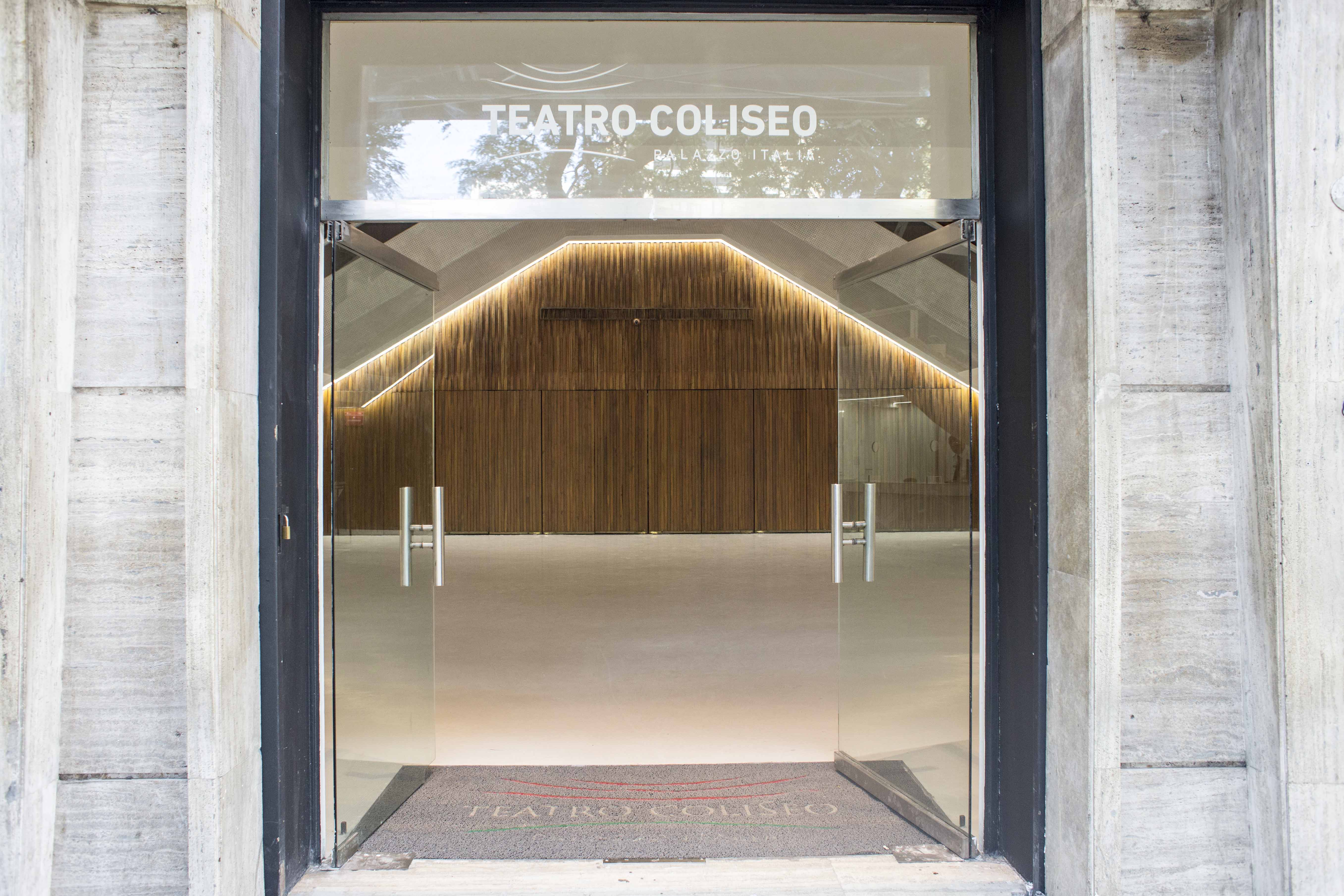

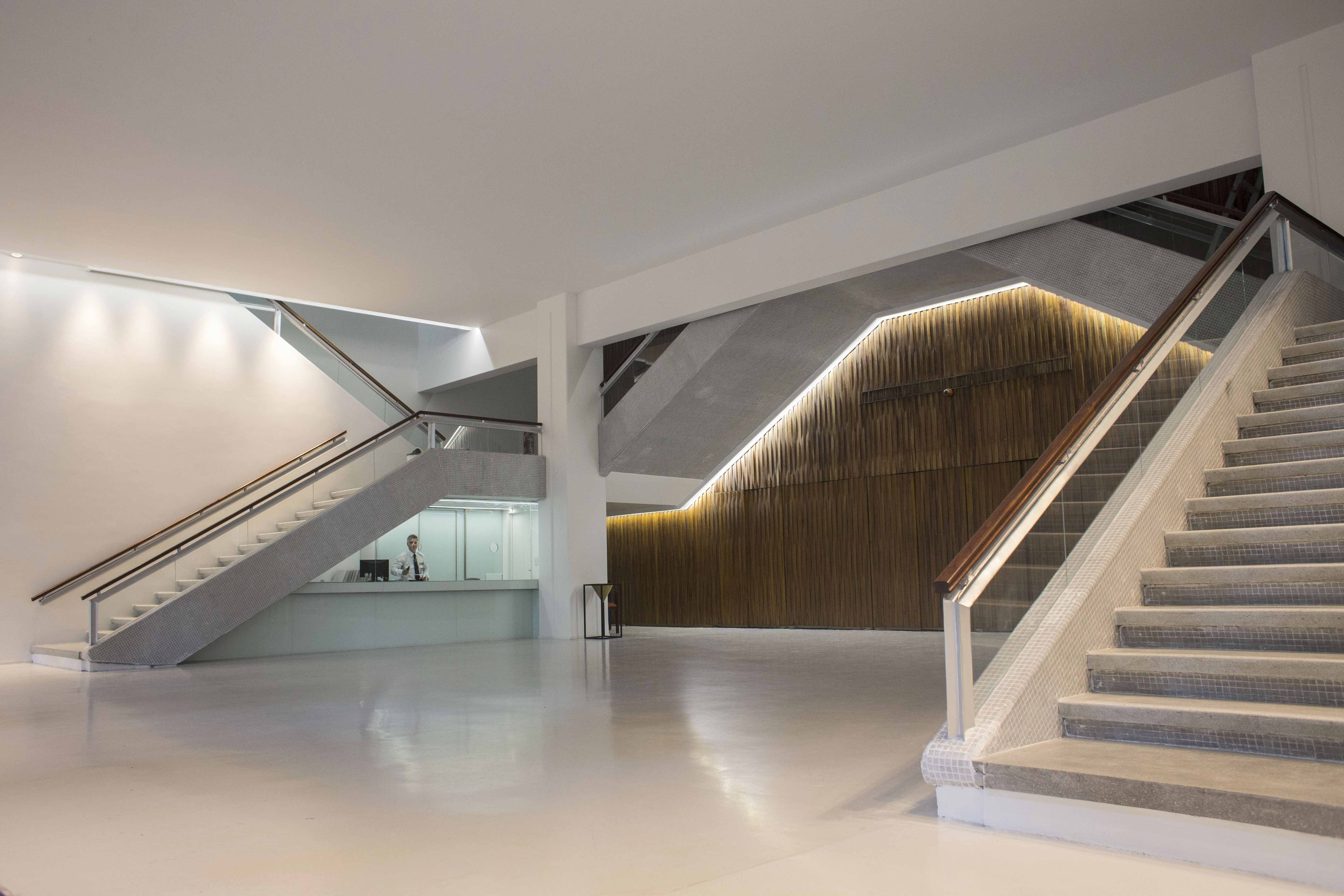

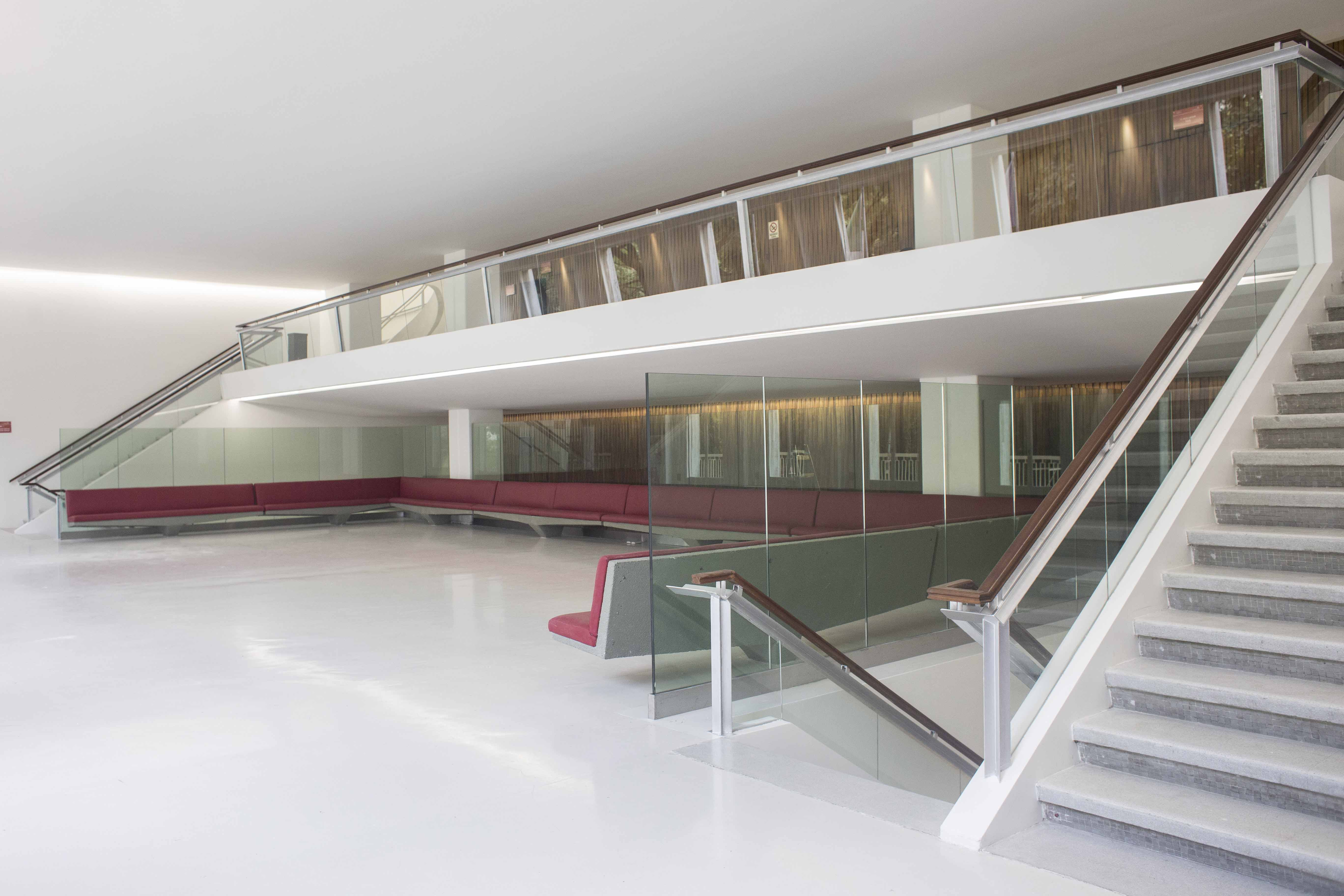

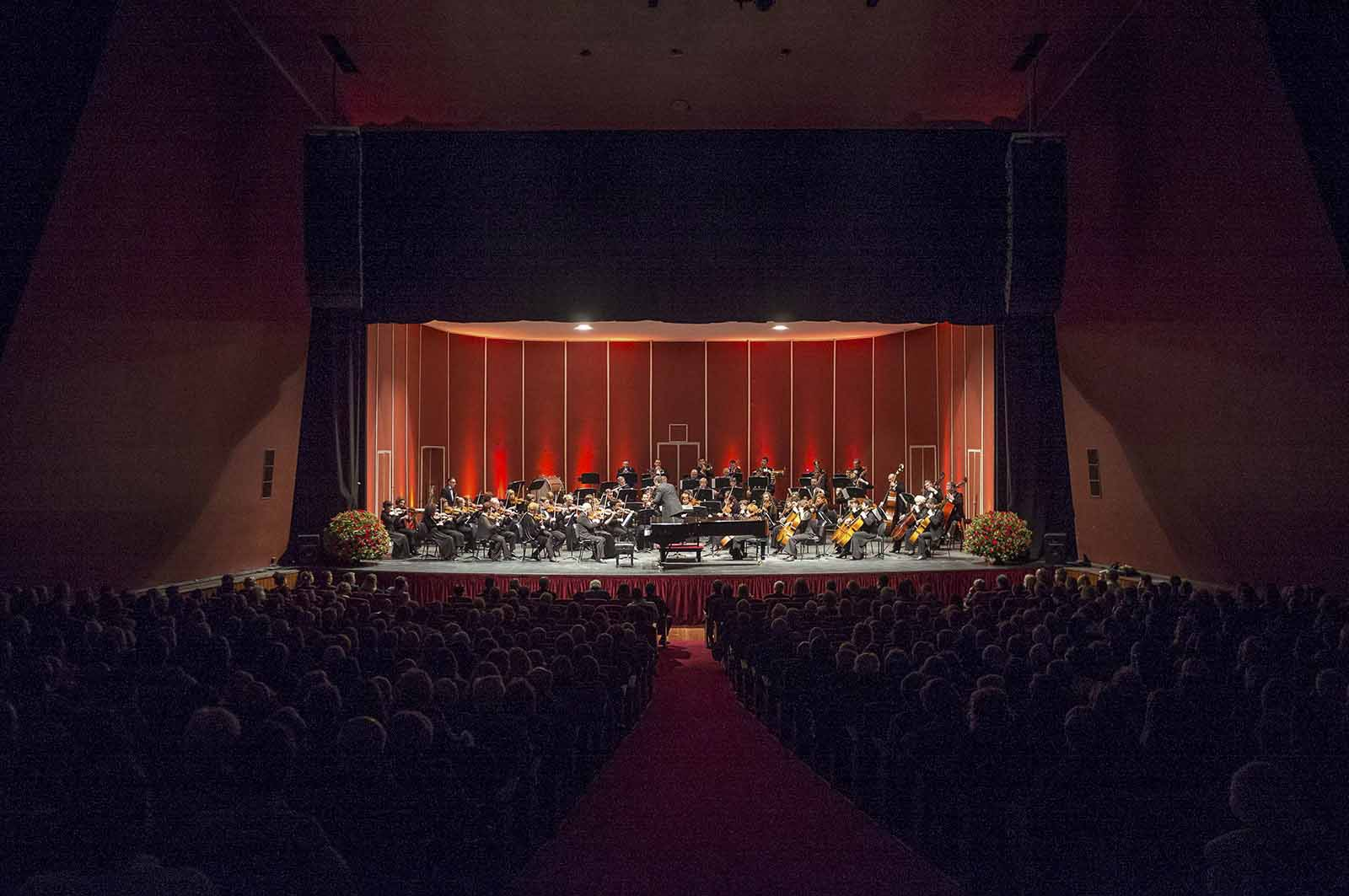

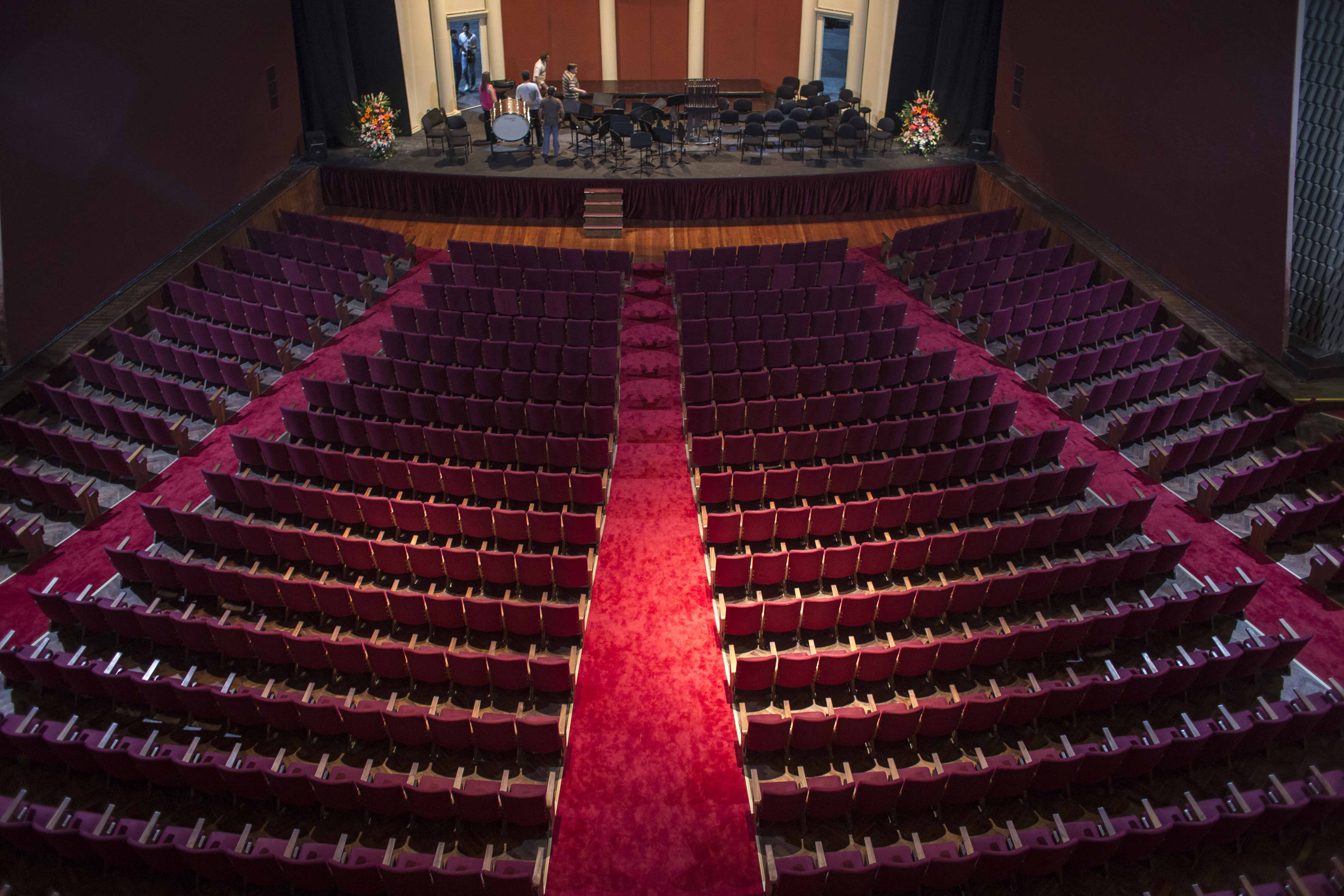
