= Doggy Day School =

Children's television series

- The main characters from left to right: Lois, Pedro, Suki (in back), Lucas (in front), Lili, Koda, and Rosie
- Created by: Cathy Moss
- Written by: Daryl Susan Brown; Thomas LaPierre; Katherine Sandford; Cathy Moss; Jordan Wheeler; Gisela Marques; Fernando Salem; Stephan Dubreuil; Gerard Lewis; Manon Berthelet; Muguette Berthelet
- Directed by: Stefan Leblanc; Marcelo de Moura
- Voices of: Sonja Ball; Mark Hauser; Angela Galuppo; Kaniehtiio Horn
- Composers: Paulo Tatit; Sandra Peres; Fabio Martins; Jonas Tatit; Akira Ueno
- Countries of origin: Brazil; Canada
- No. of seasons: 2
- No. of episodes: 52

Production
- Executive producers: Vivianne Morin; Louis Laverdière; Lorraine Richard; Gil Ribeiro; João Daniel Tikhomiroff; Michel Tikhomiroff
- Producers: Tiago Mello; Greg Dummett; Louise Richard
- Editor: Thiago Salerno
- Running time: 11 minutes
- Production companies: Mixer Films; Cité-Amérique

Original release
- Network: Nickelodeon
- Release: October 12, 2009 – October 27, 2011

Related
- Doki; Fishtronaut; My Big Big Friend; Trunk Train

Doggy Day School (Escuela para perros in Latin America, or Escola Pra Cachorro in Brazil) is an animated children's television series created by Cathy Moss, who also created Franny's Feet.

It debuted on Nickelodeon in Brazil on 12 October 2009.

== Premise ==
Doggy Day School revolves around five dogs, Lucas, Lili, Koda, Suki, and Pedro, who go to a day school owned by Rosie every morning. The group of puppies learn about each other and the world they live in, all while having various adventures together.

== Characters ==
=== Main ===
- Lucas (voiced by Sonja Ball) is a Dalmatian, and the mascot of the group. He is easily excitable and curious, even in the most serious situations.
- Lili (voiced by Angela Galuppo) is a charming and delicate Miniature Poodle. Sometimes she gets bossy, and she loves to gossip. She is also full of fun ideas.
- Koda (voiced by Mark Hauser) is a Siberian Husky who loves adventure. He has a big imagination and a desire to become a superhero.
- Suki (voiced by Sonja Ball) is a Newfoundland dog. She is very docile and sensitive, as she is always willing to help the other puppies.
- Pedro (voiced by Mark Hauser) is a Basset Hound. He is the intelligent street dog of the group, and he loves to eat biscuits.
- Rosie (voiced by Kaniehtiio Horn) is the owner of the day school who looks after the pets.

=== Recurring ===
- Lois is a cat and a bad neighbor to the dogs, she lives in the pet store next door.
- Vlad (voiced by Mark Hauser) is a stunt dog movie star who frequently visits the daycare and demonstrates his tricks for the group.
- Daisy is an Afghan Hound. She appears in the episode "Food for Thought".

== Episodes ==
Series premiered in Brazil on 12 October 2009.

Series	Episodes	Originally released	
Series	Episodes	First released	Last released
1	26	12 October 2009	28 December 2009
2	26	11 October 2010	27 October 2011

=== Season 1 (2009) ===
No.	Title	Written by	Original release date	Prod. code
1	"Pig Deal"	Cathy Moss	12 October 2009	101
2	"Small is Beautiful"	Cathy Moss	12 October 2009	102
3	"Sports Day"	Manon & Muguette Berthelet (writing) and Thomas Lapierre (translation)	12 October 2009	103
4	"Do the Itch"	Gerard Lewis	12 October 2009	104
5	"Super Koda!"	Katherine Sandford	19 October 2009	105
6	"Diamond Lili"	Katherine Sandford	19 October 2009	106
7	"Hidden Talent"	Cathy Moss	26 October 2009	107
8	"Pedro's Secret"	Katherine Sandford	26 October 2009	108
9	"Oodles of Poodles"	Cathy Moss	2 November 2009	109
10	"Food for Thought"	Cathy Moss	2 November 2009	110
11	"Bath Time"	Cathy Moss	9 November 2009	111
12	"Koda and the Three Bears"	Gerard Lewis	9 November 2009	112
13	"Cone Head"	Jordan Wheeler	16 November 2009	113
14	"Magic Lamp"	Manon & Muguette Berthelet (writing) and Thomas Lapierre (translation)	16 November 2009	115
15	"Best in Show"	Manon & Muguette Berthelet (writing) and Thomas Lapierre (translation)	23 November 2009	114
16	"Patience Lucas!"	Manon & Muguette Berthelet (writing) and Thomas Lapierre (translation)	23 November 2009	116
17	"Bossy Boots!"	Cathy Moss	30 November 2009	117
18	"Rosie's Gift"	Gisela Marques	30 November 2009	118
19	"The Runaround"	Gerard Lewis	7 December 2009	119
20	"Something's Fishy"	Cathy Moss	7 December 2009	120
21	"Zippy the Turtle"	Katherine Sandford	14 December 2009	121
22	"Good Enough"	Jordan Wheeler	14 December 2009	122
23	"My First Day"	Fernando Salem (writing) and Gisela Marques (translation)	21 December 2009	123
24	"Let's Get Ready"	Cathy Moss	21 December 2009	124
25	"Dogs with Jobs"	Manon & Muguette Berthelet (writing) and Thomas LaPierre (translation)	28 December 2009	125
26	"Visit to the Vet"	Cathy Moss	28 December 2009	126

=== Season 2 (2010-2011) ===
No.	Title	Written by	Original release date	Prod. code
1	"Pedro's Faux-Paw"	Cathy Moss	October 11, 2010	201
2	"The Misunderstanding"	Manon & Muguette Berthelet (writing) and Thomas Lapierre (translation)	October 12, 2010	202
3	"Sorry Story"	Cathy Moss	October 13, 2010	203
4	"Detective Dogs"	Katherine Sandford	October 14, 2010	204
5	"The New Substitute"	Katherine Sandford	October 15, 2010	205
6	"Unfair Trade"	Gerard Lewis	October 18, 2010	206
7	"Star Trouble"	Cathy Moss	October 19, 2010	207
8	"Robot Dog"	Cathy Moss	October 20, 2010	208
9	"Giggly Pig"	Cathy Moss	October 20, 2010	209
10	"Pedro's Pretend"	Cathy Moss	October 21, 2010	210
11	"Cat on the Mat"	Cathy Moss	October 22, 2010	211
12	"Pirate Vlad"	Katherine Sandford	October 25, 2010	212
13	"A Heroic Rescue"	Manon & Muguette Berthelet (writing) and Thomas Lapierre (translation)	October 10, 2011	213
14	"Share Affair"	Cathy Moss	October 11, 2011	215
15	"Too Hot to Trot!"	Cathy Moss	October 12, 2011	214
16	"Silent Lucas"	Katherine Sandford	October 13, 2011	216
17	"Lucas Saves the Day"	Cathy Moss	October 14, 2011	217
18	"Mixed Biscuits"	Cathy Moss	October 17, 2011	218
19	"Where is Rosie's Hat?"	Cathy Moss	October 18, 2011	219
20	"Fish Sees the World"	Cathy Moss	October 19, 2011	220
21	"Carnival"	Cathy Moss	October 20, 2011	221
22	"A Home for Hank"	Cathy Moss	October 21, 2011	222
23	"Little Lucas"	Manon & Muguette Berthelet (writing) and Thomas Lapierre (translation)	October 24, 2011	223
24	"A Cheater in the Pack"	Manon & Muguette Berthelet (writing) and Thomas Lapierre (translation)	October 25, 2011	224
25	"Dogs with Jobs"	Cathy Moss	October 26, 2011	225
26	"Visit to the Vet"	Gerard Lewis, Daryl Susan Brown and Stephan Dubreuil (writing and translation)	October 27, 2011	226

== Broadcast ==
Doggy Day School debuted on Nickelodeon in Brazil on 12 October 2009, however the series was dubbed in Brazilian Portuguese. The series aired in its original English-language version on TVOKids, Knowledge Kids and the Aboriginal Peoples Television Network in Canada from 2010 to 2019.
