= Lost in the West =

2016 television miniseries directed by Carlos González

- Genre: Comedy-western
- Written by: Kevin M Brennan; Doug Manley
- Directed by: Carlos González
- Starring: Caleb Thomas; Niko Guardado; Fallon Smythe; Morgan Higgins
- Music by: Federico Jusid
- Country of origin: United States
- Original language: English
- No. of seasons: 1
- No. of episodes: 3

Production
- Running time: 43–45 minutes
- Production company: Galdo Media

Original release
- Network: Nickelodeon
- Release: May 28 – May 30, 2016

Lost in the West is a three-part comedy-western miniseries that aired on Nickelodeon from May 28–30, 2016. It was directed by Carlos González and produced by Galdo Media.

== Plot ==
Two stepbrothers accidentally invent a time machine and are transported from the present day to the year 1885, where they come into conflict with the local mayor.

== Cast and characters ==
- Caleb Thomas as Chip Caldwell
- Niko Guardado as Dave Flowers
- Fallon Smythe as Lisa Waters and Luna
- Morgan Higgins as Texas Jane
- James Eeles as Cody Duvalier
- Kamran Darabi-Ford as Mitch Duvalier
- Mark Schardman as Doc Duvalier
- Alex Sawyer as Jimmy the Kid
- Jeff Zach as Chief Running Water

== Episodes ==
| No. | Title | Directed by | Written by | Original release date | U.S. viewers (millions) |
|---|---|---|---|---|---|
| 1 | "Part 1" | Carlos Gonzalez | Kevin M Brennan & Doug Manley | May 28, 2016 | 1.22 |
| 2 | "Part 2" | Carlos Gonzalez | Kevin M Brennan & Doug Manley | May 29, 2016 | 1.20 |
| 3 | "Part 3" | Carlos Gonzalez | Kevin M Brennan & Doug Manley | May 30, 2016 | 1.00 |

The series averaged 1.14 million viewers over three consecutive days.

== See also ==
- List of films broadcast by Nickelodeon
