= Marcelo, Marmelo, Martelo (TV series) =

- Genre: Comedy; Adventure; Fantasy
- Based on: Marcelo, Marmelo, Martelo by Ruth Rocha
- Developed by: Alice Gomes; Thamires S. Gomes; Eduardo Vaisman
- Written by: Alice Gomes; Thamires S. Gomes; Eduardo Vaisman
- Directed by: Eduardo Vaisman; Maria Farkas; Antonio Hamburguer (episodes 8, 10–13)
- Starring: Enzo Rosetti; David Martins; Rihanna Barbosa; Lara Capuzzo
- Music by: Arnaldo Antunes
- Opening theme: "Marcelo Marmelo Martelo" by Arnaldo Antunes
- Composers: Diogo Poças; Leonardo Mendes; Ian Cardoso
- Country of origin: Brazil
- Original language: Portuguese
- No. of seasons: 1
- No. of episodes: 13

Production
- Executive producers: Juan "JC" Acosta; Federico Cuervo; Fernando Gastón; Jose "Fidji" Viggiano; Maria Angela de Jesus; Tereza Gonzalez; Margarida Ribeiro; Marcia Vinci; Gil Ribeiro
- Producer: Marute Viana
- Production location: São Paulo
- Editors: Lia Kulakauskas; AMC
- Running time: 30 minutes
- Production companies: VIS; Coiote

Original release
- Network: Paramount+
- Release: July 8, 2023

Marcelo, Marmelo, Martelo is a Brazilian television series produced by Paramount+ and collaboration with Coiote, based on the children's book of the same name written by Ruth Rocha. The series premiered on Paramount+ on July 8, 2023, and it also aired on Nickelodeon Brazil.

== Plot ==
The series tells the adventures of a different child, who has his own way of expressing himself, thinking and dressing. His personality and his creativity help him conquer his three best friends from the Caramelo neighborhood: Catapimba, the fastest soccer player; Teresinha, a very organized girl; and Gabriela, who is super smart and has the most powerful kick in the neighborhood. Marcelo, together with his friends, will transform the world in each episode.

== Cast ==
=== Main ===
- Enzo Rosetti as Marcelo Marmelo Martelo
- David Martins as Catapimba
- Rihanna Barbosa as Teresinha
- Lara Capuzzo as Gabriela

=== Secondary ===
- Oscar Filho as João Martelo
- Priscila Sol as Laura Marmelo
- Clarinha Jordão as Aninha Marmelo
- Antoniela Canto as Carminha Tavares
- Theo Werneck as Seu Manoel
- Marcia Manfredini as Tia Zuzu
- Billy Saga as Luiz Claudio
- Karin Hils as Cristina
- Alexandre Ogata as Pipoqueiro Nicolau

== Production ==
On October 8, 2020, ViacomCBS International Studios announced the purchase of the audiovisual rights of Marcelo Marmelo Martelo, the most successful book collection by Brazilian writer Ruth Rocha for the international production of a series with youthful children's content, in collaboration with Coiote Producciones Cinematográficas. The series runs in São Paulo between March 7 and September 22, 2022. In January 2024, the series was removed from Paramount+.

== Broadcast ==
The series is being shown in Brazil by Paramount+ and Nickelodeon and in the rest of Latin America by Paramount+. It will also be shown in Canada, United Kingdom, Australia, Austria, France, Germany, Ireland, Italy and Switzerland.

== Episodes ==
No.	Brazilian Portuguese title	Original release date	Nickelodeon Brazil air date
1	"Marcelo Marmelo Martelo"	July 8, 2023	July 8, 2023
2	"Desfuncionice"	July 8, 2023	July 15, 2023
3	"Meiossário do Catapimba"	July 8, 2023	July 22, 2023
4	"Eumesmice"	July 8, 2023	July 29, 2023
5	"Moitarar"	July 8, 2023	August 5, 2023
6	"Desinternetizar"	July 8, 2023	August 12, 2023
7	"Amiguília"	July 8, 2023	August 19, 2023
8	"Sucolate infinito"	July 8, 2023	August 26, 2023
9	"Cincatlo do Caramelo"	July 8, 2023	September 2, 2023
10	"Desazarar"	July 8, 2023	September 9, 2023
11	"Antitragedário"	July 8, 2023	September 16, 2023
12	"Criancante do Caramelo"	July 8, 2023	September 23, 2023
13	"Noitia na Moradeira"	July 8, 2023	September 30, 2023

== Awards ==
Year	Award	Category	Nominee(s)	Result	Ref.
2023	Rose d'Or	Best Children's series	Marcelo, Marmelo, Martelo	Nominated	
