= Vikki RPM =

American telenovela

- Genre: Telenovela
- Created by: Catharina Ledeboer; Rocio Lara
- Story by: Eduardo Jiménez-Pons
- Starring: Samantha Siqueros; Stefano Ollivier; Leo Deluglio; Scarlet Gruber; Isabella Castillo; Andrés Mercado; Gabriel Tarantini; Angela Rincón; Angelo Valotta; Vanessa Blandón; Saúl Lisazo
- Opening theme: "Juntos correr" by Isabella Castillo
- Original language: Spanish
- No. of episodes: 60

Production
- Production location: United States
- Camera setup: Multi-camera
- Production company: Somos Productions

Original release
- Network: Nickelodeon Latin America
- Release: July 31 – October 20, 2017

Vikki RPM is an American telenovela produced by Somos Productions for Nickelodeon Latin America. The series was presented in Natpe as Fórmula A. It is an original idea by Eduardo Jiménez-Pons, written by Catharina Ledeboer and Rocio Lara. It premiered on July 31, 2017, and it stars Samantha Siqueros, Stefano Ollivier, Isabella Castillo, Scarlet Gruber and Leo Deluglio. The series revolves around Victoria (Samantha Siqueros) a young girl with a dream of becoming a great pilot of Formula 1.

== Cast ==
=== Main ===
- Samantha Siqueiros as Victoria "Vikki" Franco
- Stefano Ollivier as Max Legrand
- Leo Deluglio as Iker Borges
- Scarlet Gruber as Kira Rivera
- Isabella Castillo as Roxana "Rox" Cruz
- Andrés Mercado as Matías Ocampo
- Gabriel Tarantini as Fede Toledo
- Angela Rincón as Penny
- Angelo Valotia as Oliver
- Vanessa Blandón as Emily Santos
- Saúl Lisazo como Turbo Bonetti

=== Recurring ===
- Maite Embil as Romina Bonetti
- Yul Bürkle as Graco Rivera
- Ana Karina Manco as Jacqueline Rivera
- Paulo Quevedo as Dider Legrand
- María Gabriela de Faría as Francesca Ortíz
- Jose Galindo as Profesor General

== Series overview ==
Series	Episodes	Originally released	
Series	Episodes	First released	Last released
1	60	31 July 2017	20 October 2017
