= Heidi, bienvenida a casa =

- Genre: Telenovela
- Created by: Marcela Citterio
- Based on: Heidi by Johanna Spyri
- Written by: Marisa Milanesio; Julieta Steinberg; Claudia Morales
- Directed by: Jorge Montero; Emilio Medina
- Creative director: Julia Bossio
- Starring: Chiara Francia; Mercedes Lambre; Victorio D'Alessandro; Mario Guerci; Florencia Benitez
- Opening theme: "Un lugar mejor", performed by Chiara Francia
- Composers: Santiago Talledo, Martin Della Nina and Sebastián De La Riega
- Countries of origin: Argentina; Italy
- Original language: Spanish
- No. of seasons: 2
- No. of episodes: 120

Production
- Executive producers: Javier Francia; Rotsy González; Micaela Montero; Ángela Ardilla
- Production company: Mondo TV

Original release
- Network: Nickelodeon Latin America
- Release: March 13, 2017 – February 14, 2019

Heidi, bienvenida a casa is a telenovela created and produced by Marcela Citterio for Nickelodeon Latin America. Based on the 1881 children's novel by Johanna Spyri, Heidi, it stars Chiara Francia as the titular character. The series premiered on March 13, 2017.

The series follows the story of Heidi, a girl who lives in the mountains with her grandfather, her best friend and her animals, until her Aunt Dete arrives to take her to live in the city.

Music for the show was produced by Martin Della Nina and Sebastian De La Riega at Estudio Santito.

The second season premiered in November 2018.

== Plot ==
Heidi, an adventurous mountain twelve-year old girl sees how her life changes when she has to move to the city. There she will live in the Seseman mansion and meet Clara, a girl with agoraphobia that Heidi will try to help.

== Series overview ==
Series	Episodes	Originally released	
Series	Episodes	First released	Last released
1	60	13 March 2017	2 June 2017
2	60	12 November 2018	14 February 2019

== Cast ==
=== Main ===
- Chiara Francia as Heidi
- Mercedes Lambre as Emma
- Victorio D'Alessandro as Toro
- Mario Guerci as Sesemann
- Florencia Benitez as Rottenmeier
- Victoria Ramos as Clara

=== Recurring ===
- Melisa Garat as Maxine
- Minerva Casero as Morena
- Joaquín Ochoa as Lolo
- Francisco Francia (Pancho) as Pedro
- Santiago Achaga as Junior
- Yoyi Francella as Vicky
- Nicolás Di Pace as Imanol/Oliver
- Nicolás Riedel as Boris
- Paulina Patterson as Sol
- Sofía Morandi as Abril
- Tiziano Francia as Diego
- Sol Estevanez as Rita
- Daniel Campomenosi as Ulises
- Mónica Bruni as Dete
- Fernando Fernández as Abuelito
- Adriana Salonia as Paulina
- Pietro Sorba as Pietro
- Marger Sealey as Sheila

=== Special participation ===
- Santiago Talledo as Clemente
- Pepe Monje as Gerardo
