= Anthimos Ananiadis =

Greek actor and model

- Άνθιμος Ανανιάδης
- Born: 9 June 1985 (age 40); Thessaloniki, Greece
- Other names: Anthem Moss
- Education: Giorgos Kimoulis Drama School; New York College
- Occupations: Actor; director; film producer; model
- Partner: Maria Nefeli Gazi (2016-2018)
- Children: 1
- Parent(s): Timos Ananiadis; Evi Karagianni

Anthem Moss (Born 9 June 1985), or Anthimos Ananiadis (Greek: Άνθιμος Ανανιάδης), is a Greek actor, director, producer, and model best known from his leading role in Maria, i Aschimi, the Greek edition of the television series Ugly Betty. For most of 2007-2008, he simultaneously played the lead role of Benjamin Braddock in The Graduate at the Bretania Theatre.

He found his film company AA Productions which co-produced the mystery-action noir film The Greek Job (2023) set in contemporary Greece has been developing for years where Ananiadis directs and stars in the film, with music by Mikis Theodorakis approved the use of his composition Dromoi Palioi ("Old Roads") in a modern arrangement before his death, with an international cast, including notable actors, his stepfather, the late Greek actor Kostas Voutsas, in his final film appearance, Eric Roberts, Greek-Australian Costas Mandylor, Rico Simonini, Maria Korinthiou, Mihalis Markatis, Iphigenia Makri, Vangelis Mourikis and others.

== Early life ==
Ananiadis was born in Thessaloniki (Greece) where he started studying theatre at the age of 12. After joining the Giorgos Kimoulis Drama School and landing an award-winning role for This is our Youth (2004) as "Breakthrough Artist of the Year," he went on to perform in the opening ceremony of the 2004 Olympic Games as "Love." After spending a year for military service in the Hellenic Army, Anthimos returned to the silver screen in Loathing and Camouflage (2005), which was both a commercial and critical success. By 2006, his leading role in Straight Story (2006), the most successful movie in the history of Greece, earned him a nomination for "Best Leading Actor" in the Thessaloniki International Film Festival. Then his role as "Alexis" in the hit TV series Ugly Maria earned him another nomination as "Best Leading Man" at the TV Faces Award. In 2007, after a critically acclaimed performance as Benjamin Braddock in the stage production of The Graduate, he also went on to star in the Greek version of Surfs Up (2007) and numerous other film, TV and stage productions.

In his first year in Los Angeles, Anthem landed the leading role in the movie "1001 Ways To Enjoy The Missionary Position" opposite Amanda Plummer and the leading role in the film "Sol". He has also starred in another five independent feature films such as "Brief Star" directed by Juan Ramos, "The Hollywood Percentage" directed by Eddie Romero, "Dreams" directed by Peter Ferguson, "Player A" directed by Joshua Perev and Sayulita directed by Jacob Swanson. Most recently he has performed on stage playing Stanley Kowalsky in the theater production, "The Street Car Named Desire", by Tennessee Williams (2011).

He is the son of the actress/model Evi Karagiani and Timos Ananiadis. His stepfather is the Greek actor Kostas Voutsas. After moving to Los Angeles, Anthimos beat out the competition to land the leading role of Joel in the Indie film 1,001 Ways to Enjoy the Missionary Position.

== Personal life ==
In late 2016, Ananiadis started dating dancer Maria Nefeli Gazi, during their collaboration for the theatrical play "Dorian Gray Frames". On April 21, 2018 Gazi gave birth to their son, Philipos-Dimitris Gazis, but they separated one month later.

== Selected filmography ==
=== Film ===
Year	Title	Role	Notes	Ref.
2023-2025	The Greek Job	Giannis Grigoriadis (Johnny Greek)		
2016	Brief Star			
2014	Foreign Relations	Nikos		
2013	Loud and Deep	Rico		
2012	My Earl Grey	Geo		
2012	Performance Anxiety	Director		
2012	94	Raymond		
2011	Orange Inn			
2009	1,001 Ways to Enjoy the Missionary Position	Joel		
2006	Straight Story (2006 film)	Giannis		
2005	Loafing and Camouflage: Sirens in the Aegean	Soldier		

=== Television ===
Year	Title	Role	Channel	Notes	Ref.
2018	Sunday live		ANT1	Game show	
2018	Celebrity game night		ANT1	Game show	
2018	Dancing with the Stars		ANT1	Dance TV show	
2017	Star Academy		E Channel	Reality TV show	
2008	How to Look Good Naked		Channel 4	TV series	
2007-2008	Maria, i Aschimi (Μαρία η Άσχημη)	Alexis Mantas	Mega	TV series	
2005-2006	Secret Paths (Κρυφά μονοπάτια)	Angelos	ANT1	TV series	
2005-2006	Sole negligence (Μόνη εξ αμελείας)		NET	TV series	
2003-2005	Almost Never (Σχεδόν Ποτέ)		ERT2	TV series	
2003-2004	At Close Distance (Απόσταση Αναπνοής)	Theofilos	Mega	TV series	

== Music videos ==
Year	Title	Artist	Notes
2010	Let the Guilt Go	Korn	Video clip

== Theatre ==
Year	Title	Role	Vevue	Notes	Ref.
2017	Dorian Gray Frames	Dorian Gray	Polis Theatre (Athens); BlackBox (Thessaloniki)		
2010	A Streetcar Named Desire				
2007-2009	The Graduate	College boy	Bretania Theatre (Athens)		
