= Pobre Diabla =

Pobre Diabla may refer to:

- Pobre Diabla (Mexican TV series), a 2009 telenovela
- Pobre Diabla (Peruvian TV series), a 2000 telenovela
- "Pobre Diabla", a song by Don Omar from the album The Last Don Live
