= 1992 Colombian energy crisis =

The 1992 Colombian energy crisis was a crisis of the Colombian energy sector during the presidency of César Gaviria, from May 2, 1992, to February 7, 1993, caused by El Niño. El Niño caused droughts across much of the country, which lowered reservoir levels at many of its principal hydroelectric dams and a further crisis within the state public services company, Interconexión Eléctrica, S.A. (ISA).

== Causes ==
El Niño occurs when warm waters originating off the coast of Australia reach South American shores. This causes significant variation in marine climates and droughts and floods. The 1992 El Niño, which produced droughts in Colombia, coincided with infrastructure problems within the nation's hydroelectric power facilities.

== Rationing ==
The government under president César Gaviria opted to take action, introducing a rationing program. On March 2, 1992, the government announced scheduled power cuts, of up to nine hours in cities such as Bogotá and up to 18 hours on the islands of San Andrés y Providencia. Public awareness campaigns were launched under the name "Cierre la llave" ("Turn Off the Tap"), hoping to measure how much water was being wasted. In the city of Cali, a decree was passed setting six days in prison as a penalty for heavy water users.

=== "Hora Gaviria" ===
As a further measure, Gaviria changed Colombia's time zone from UTC-5 to UTC-4, which was then the time zone of neighboring Venezuela, beginning on Saturday, May 2, 1992, at 1:00 am. The measure came to be known as "Hora Gaviria" ("Gaviria Time"). Of Colombia's 1,024 municipalities, 1,000 declined to change time zones and took months to come into effect. The time zone change was ended on February 7, 1993.

== Impacts ==
One of two most popular telenovelas of 1992 in Colombia, En cuerpo ajeno, was moved from 8pm to 10pm on Cadena Uno, then a highly unusual timeslot for flagship novelas on Colombian television, so that more viewers could see it when they were not impacted by energy rationing (the blackouts in Bogotá ended at 9 pm). The other popular telenovela, Sangre de Lobos, was already being broadcast at 10pm on Canal A. Caracol Radio created a program, La Luciérnaga ("The Firefly"), for the early evening hours when power cuts were in effect in many areas; as of 2026, the program remains on the air.
