= Ana María Orozco =

Colombian actress (born 1973)

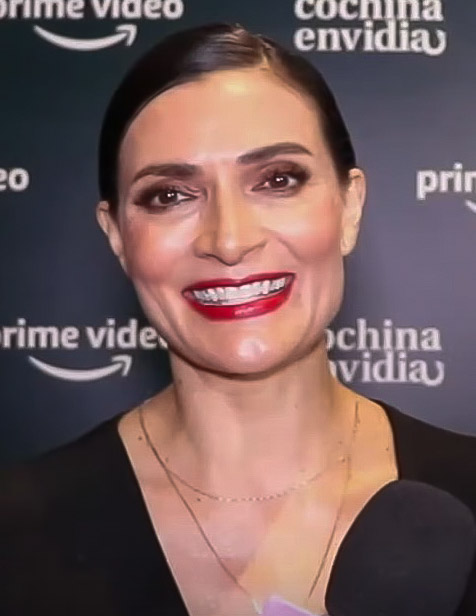
- Orozco in October 2022
- Born: July 4, 1973 (age 53); Bogotá, Colombia
- Occupation: Television actress
- Years active: 1973–present
- Spouses: Julián Arango (m. 1999; div. 2000) Martín Quaglia (m. 2005; div. 2012)
- Children: 2
- Parent(s): Luis Fernando Orozco; Carmenza Aristizábal
- Relatives: Verónica Orozco (sister) Juliana Orozco (sister)
- Website: www.anamaria-orozco.info

Ana María Orozco Aristizábal (born July 4, 1973) is a Colombian actress who is notable for her portrayal as Betty in the telenovela Yo soy Betty, la fea. In 2001, Orozco won the award for International Female Personality of the Year (Figura internacional femenina del año) at the New York Latin ACE Awards and, in 2002, she won the award for Actress of the Year (Actriz del año) at the INTE Awards for her performance in the telenovela Yo soy Betty, la fea (1999).

== Personal life ==
Born in Bogotá, Colombia. Orozco is the daughter of actor Luis Fernando Orozco and radio announcer Carmenza Aristizábal. She is also the older sister of actress Verónica Orozco (b. 1979) and Juliana. In April 1999, Orozco married actor Julian Arango, but the marriage lasted only 10 months. Since 2004, she has lived in Bogotá, Colombia. From 2005 to 2012, she was married to Argentine musician Martín Quaglia. Quaglia and Orozco have two daughters, Lucrecia (b. 11 June 2004 in Bogotá, Colombia) and Mia (b. October, 2009 in Buenos Aires, Argentina).

== Career ==
Orozco made her television debut as a child alongside her father, Luis Fernando Orozco, in La envidia (1973), but her career began in earnest a decade later with the series Pequeños Gigantes (1983). One of her most memorable performances was as a secretary (Verônica Murillo) in Perro Amor (1998). She is best known to fans around the world as the original Betty from the popular Colombian telenovela Yo soy Betty, la fea (I am Betty, the ugly) and its spinoff Eco moda. Her role on Betty La Fea and the character's unattractive/ugly duckling trademark has inspired several international versions, including the Mexican serial La fea más bella and the American hit Ugly Betty. According to The New York Times, the original version itself become one of the world's most popular television shows.

== Filmography ==
=== Television ===
==== Telenovelas ====
Year	Title	Role
1973/4	La envidia	Nana
1991	Sangre de Lobos	Belinda
1993	La potra zaina	Magdalena Ahumada
1995	Flor de Oro	Anita
1996	La huella de tus besos	Lucía
1997	Tiempos difíciles	Maestra Sarita
1998	Perro Amor	Verónica Murillo
1999/2001	Yo soy Betty, la fea	Beatriz Aurora Pinzón Solano
2014	Somos familia	Manuela Paz/Ramona
2016–2017	El regreso de Lucas	Elena Ayala
2017	No olvidarás mi nombre	Mónica Zapata
2018	Simona	Marilina Mendoza

==== Series / Miniseries ====
Year	Title	Role
1983	Pequeños Gigantes	
1987	Imagínate	
1988	Don Camilo	
1988	Generación 21	
1990	Los duros en acción	
1994	Almas de piedra	Claudia
1995	O todos en la cama	
2001/2	Ecomoda	Beatriz Aurora Pinzón Solano de Mendoza
2006	Mujeres Asesinas: "Mara, Alucinada"	Mara
2007	Mujeres Asesinas: "Helena, Monja"	Helena
2006/7	Amas de Casa Desesperadas 1	Susana Martínez
2007/8	Amas de Casa Desesperadas 2	Susana Martínez
2008	Oportunidades	Celia
2011	Los Únicos	Gabriela Montillo
2011	Historias de la primera vez: "La primera vez que te pedí algo"	Verónica
2012	Mi problema con las mujeres	Verónica Belforte
2012/13	Ciclo: "Cine para enamorarse"	Clara
2020	Pérdida	Milena
2024/26	Betty, la fea: la historia continúa	Beatriz Aurora Pinzón Solano

=== Movies ===
Year	Title	Role
2003	El Colombian Dream	Nicole
2006	El Ratón Pérez	Pilar
2023	How to Deal With a Heartbreak	

=== Theater ===
Year	Title	Role
2002	Muelle Oeste	Monique
2019	Betty la fea en vivo	Betty

=== Awards and nominations ===
Year	Award	Category	Work	Result
1998	Shock Award (Colombia)	Best Young Actress	Perro Amor	Won
1998	Simón Bolívar (Colombia)	Best actress cast	Perro Amor	Won
2000	India Catalina Awards (Colombia)	Best Actress	Yo soy Betty, la fea	Won
2000	2 de Oro (Venezuela)	Best International Actress	Yo soy Betty, la fea	Won
2000	TV Grama (Chile)	Best International Actress	Yo soy Betty, la fea	Won
2000	TV Elenco (Colombia)	Best Actress	Yo soy Betty, la fea	Won
2001	TV y Novelas (Colombia)	Best Lead Actress in a Soap Opera	Yo soy Betty, la fea	Won
2001	New York Latin ACE Awards	International Female Personality of the Year	Yo soy Betty, la fea	Won
2002	Grupo Editorial Correos (Spain)	TV Personality of the Year	Yo soy Betty, la fea	Won
2002	INTE Award	Actress of the Year	Yo soy Betty, la fea	Won
