= Angie Cepeda =

Colombian actress

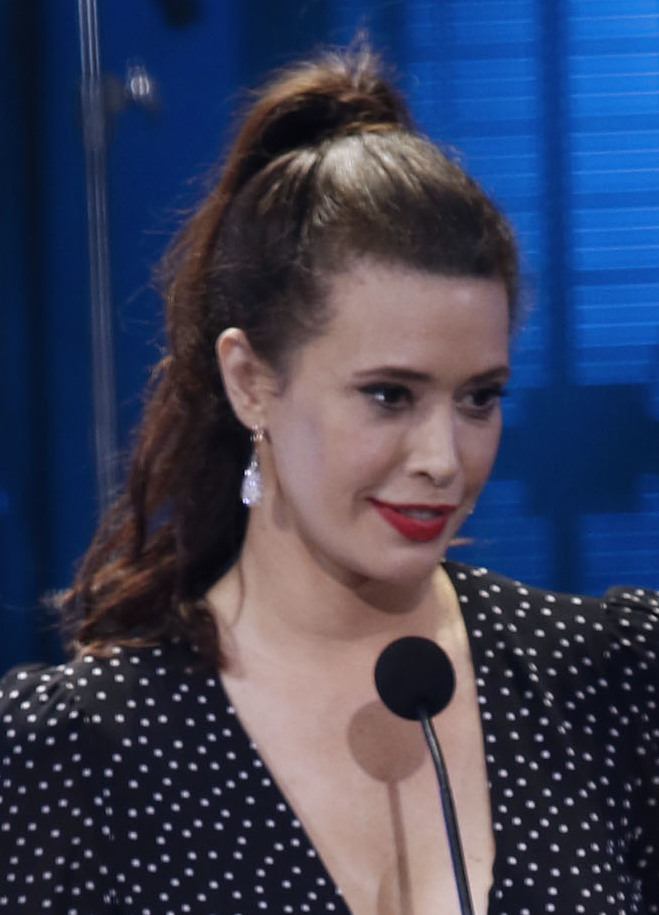
- Cepeda in 2017
- Born: Angélica María Cepeda Jiménez; 2 August 1974 (age 52); Cartagena de Indias, Colombia
- Occupation: Actress
- Years active: 1992–present
- Relatives: Lorna Cepeda (sister)

Angélica María Cepeda Jiménez (born 2 August 1974), professionally known as Angie Cepeda, is a Colombian actress. She is best known for her roles in the telenovela Pobre Diabla and the films Captain Pantoja and the Special Services and Love in the Time of Cholera. She is the younger sister of actress Lorna Cepeda.

== Early life ==
Cepeda was born in Cartagena de Indias, Colombia, and raised in Barranquilla. After her parents divorced she lived with her mother and two older sisters (one of whom is actress Lorna Paz).

== Career ==
When she discovered her vocation in drama, she moved out to Bogotá. After starting her drama courses, she was contracted by a beer company and made some advertisements for it. Next, she played some bit parts in several soap operas and movies in Colombia.

Cepeda got a role in the soap opera Las Juanas, getting the attention of some TV producers who offered her jobs in prime time shows, such as the leading role in Luz Maria (1998), co-starring Christian Meier and Rosalinda Serfaty, and that as Fiorella Morelli Flores de Mejía Guzmán in Pobre Diabla (2000), opposite Salvador del Solar and Santiago Magill.

In the cinematic world, Peruvian director Francisco Lombardi convinced her to portray a prostitute called "La Colombiana" in Pantaleón y las Visitadoras (released in English as Captain Pantoja and the Special Services). In 2021, she voiced Julieta Madrigal in the English, Spanish and Italian language versions of the Disney animated musical film Encanto.

== Filmography ==
Year	Title	Format	Role	Notes
1993	La maldición del paraíso	TV series	Laura	
1993	Crónicas de una generación trágica	Miniseries	Merceditas Nariño	
1995	Sólo una mujer	TV series	Carolina Altamirano	
1995	Candela	TV series	Candelaria Daza	
1996	Ilona llega con la lluvia	Film	Zulema	Cartagena Film Festival Award for Best Newcomer
1997	Las Juanas	TV series	Juana Valentina Salguero	
1998	Luz María	TV series	Luz María Camejo	
1999	Pantaleón y las visitadoras	Film	La Colombiana	
2000	Pobre diabla	TV series	Fiorella Morelli	
2001	Leyenda de Fuego	Film	Cecilia	
2002	El destino no tiene favoritos	Film	María	
2003	Sammy y yo	Film	Mary	Viña del Mar Film Festival Award for Best Actress
2004	Suddenly Paradise	Film	Amaranta/Anna	
2005	Love for Rent	Film	Sofía García	
2005	Vientos de agua	TV series	Mara	
2005	Oculto	Film	Natalia	
2006	El muerto	Film	María	
2006	Love in the Time of Cholera	Film	Widow Nazareth	
2007	De paso	Short Film	Marina	
2008	Fuera de lugar	TV series	Luz	
2009	Privateer	Short film	Catherine	
2010-2012	Los protegidos	TV series	Jimena García Cabrera	
2010	With or Without Love	Film	Claudia	
2011	Heleno	Film	Diamantina	
2012	Pablo Escobar, El Patrón del Mal	TV series	Regina Parejo	
2012	Exposados	TV series	Vera	
2013	A Night in Old Mexico	Film	Patty Wafers	
2014	The Vanished Elephant	Film	Mara de Barclay	
2015	Wild Horses	Film	Maria Gonzales	
2016	The Seed of Silence	Film	María del Rosario Durán	
2016	2091	TV series	Lila	
2019	Kobiety mafii 2	Film	Aida	
2019	Kill Chain	Film	The Very Bad Woman	
2021	Encanto	Film	Julieta Madrigal	English, Spanish & Italian versions
2022	Halo	TV series	Violetta Franco	
2025	Astronauta	Film	Claudia	

== Awards and nominations ==
Year	Award	Category	Work	Result
1996	Cartagena Film Festival	Best Newcomer	Ilona llega con la lluvia	Nominated
2004	Viña del Mar Film Festival	Best Actress	Sammy y yo	Won
2017	Platino Awards	Best Actress	The Seed of Silence	Nominated
