= Amas de casa desesperadas =

Amas de casa desesperadas may refer to:

- Amas de casa desesperadas (Argentine TV series), 2006
- Amas de casa desesperadas (2007 TV series), a Colombian–Ecuadorian TV series
- Amas de casa desesperadas (American TV series), 2008

== See also ==
- Desperate Housewives, an American comedy drama/mystery television series
