= Juan Soler (actor) =

Argentine actor, model and rugby union footballer

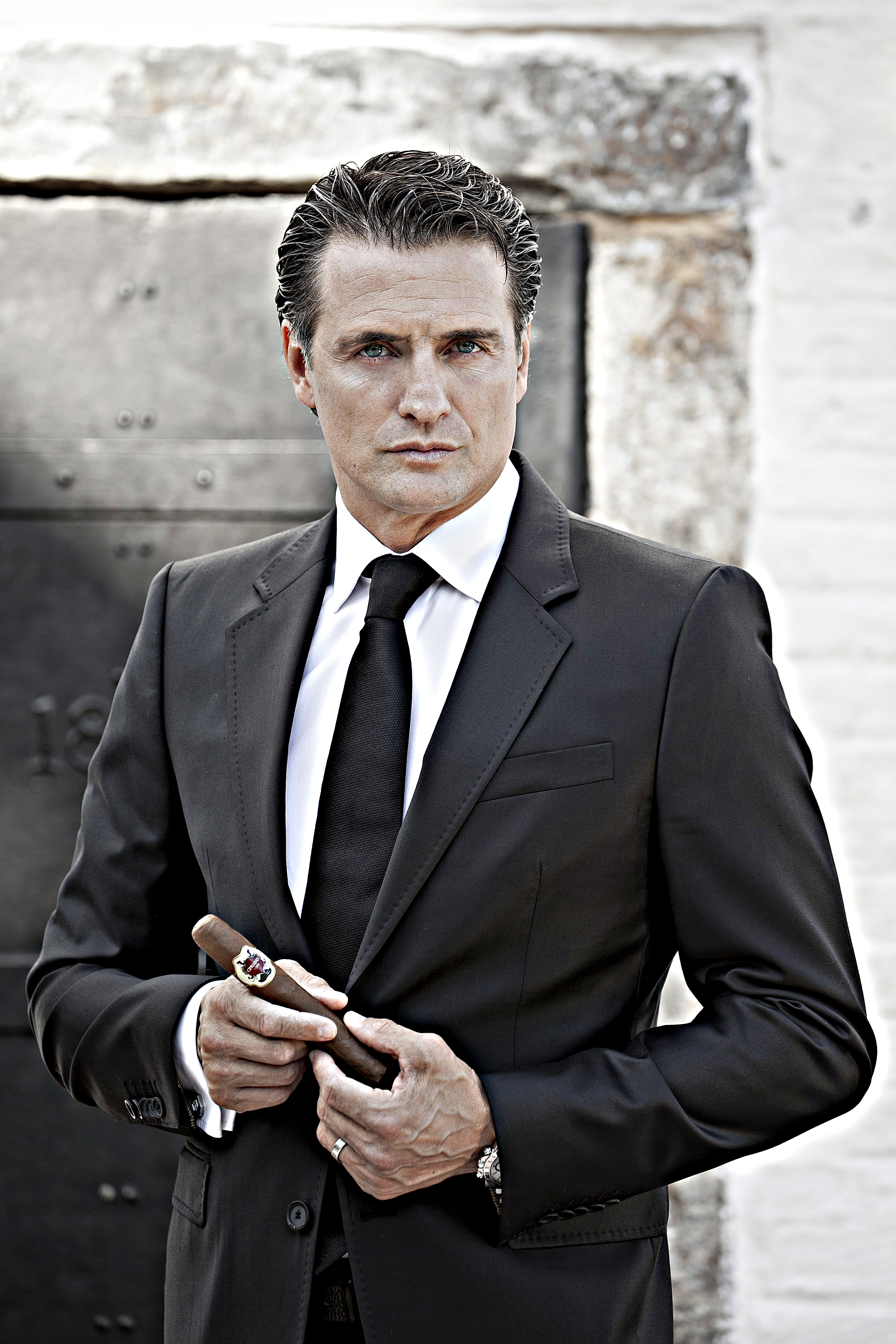
- Born: Juan Soler Valls Quiroga; January 19, 1966 (age 60); San Miguel de Tucumán, Argentina
- Occupations: Actor, rugby player, model
- Spouse: Magdalena "Maki" Moguilevsky (2003–2018)
- Children: 3 daughters

Juan Soler Valls Quiroga (born January 19, 1966) is an Argentine actor and former model and rugby union footballer. He was married to Argentine actress Magdalena "Maki" Moguilevsky with whom he has two daughters.

== Biography ==
=== Personal life ===
Soler was born in San Miguel de Tucumán, Argentina to Juan Soler Valls and Keky Quiroga. He has three siblings: Facundo, Maria Jose, and Maria Ines.

As a teenager he played rugby union and became part of the Argentina national rugby union team Los Pumas. He later became a model and started acting in plays in Argentina.

On December 20, 2003, he married actress Magdalena "Maki" Moguilevsky He owns a restaurant called El Che Loco in Mexico City. He has three daughters: Valentina, from a previous relationship, she was born in 1991 and lives in Argentina; the second daughter, Mia, was born on December 18, 2004, and his third daughter, Azùl, was born on February 20, 2007. Mia has a condition called Situs Inversus. In March 2005, Maki lost a pregnancy of three months.

=== Career ===
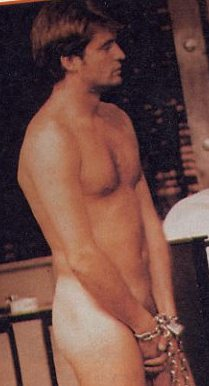
Soler in the 1980s

In 1994, after participating in the TV show Montaña rusa (TV series)|Montaña rusa and the play Juegos de sociedad he decided to move to Mexico. There, he obtained small roles in two telenovelas with Televisa and in 1996 he starred in Cañaveral de pasiones which became the most successful production of that year. He then joined the cast of Verónica Castro's telenovela Pueblo chico, infierno grande, and the Mexican production of the play P.S. Your Cat Is Dead as Eddie, touring Mexico and the United States. He also appeared in the Peruvian telenovela María Emilia: Querida. He returned to Mexico in 2000 and has made five telenovelas as of 2005, including Locura de Amor and Bajo La Misma Piel, both of which co-starred Laisha Wilkins. Juan Soler appeared in the telenovela Apuesta por un amor with Patricia Manterola in 2004, and it garnered him a best actor nomination. In 2006, he appeared in the popular Televisa hit La fea más bella.

== Filmography ==
Television performance
Year	Title	Roles	Notes
1993	Bajo un mismo rostro	Marcelo Saldívar	Recurring role; 3 episodes
1994	Montaña rusa	Federico Grumbalth	
1995–1996	Acapulco, cuerpo y alma	Humberto Bautista	
1996	Cañaveral de pasiones	Pablo Montero Rosales	Main role; 96 episodes
1997	Pueblo chico, infierno grande	Genaro Onchi	Main role; 150 episodes
1998–1999	Ángela	Mariano Bautista Solórzano	Main role; 79 episodes
1999–2000	María Emilia: Querida	Alejandro Aguirre González	Main role; 150 episodes
2000	Locura de amor	Enrique Gallardo	Main role; 115 episodes
2001	Sin pecado concebido	Octavio Allende	
2002	La Otra	Álvaro Ibáñez	Main role; 89 episodes
2003-2004	Bajo la misma piel	Alejandro Ruiz Calderón	Main role; 94 episodes
2004	La hora pico	Various Characters	
2004–2005	Apuesta por un amor	Gabriel Durán	Main role; 130 episodes
2006	Amor mío	Pablo	Episode: "Mi gran boda gringa"
2006–2007	La fea más bella	Aldo Domenzaín	Recurring role; 10 episodes
2007	¿Y ahora qué hago?	Himself	Episode: "Mi nuevo amigo"
2008	Mujeres asesinas	Fernando Quevedo	Episode: "Mi nuevo amigo"
2007–2008	Palabra de mujer	Martín Castellanos	Main role: 144 episodes
2010–2011	Cuando me enamoro	Jerónimo Linares	Main role: 172 episodes
2013–2014	Marido en alquiler	Reinaldo Ibarra	Main role: 139 episodes
2014	Reina de corazones	Víctor de Rosas	Main role: 140 episodes
2017	Su nombre era Dolores	Eduardo Z	Episodes: "Purgatorio" and "Adiós Dolores"
2017	Nada personal	Raúl Rey "El Rey"	Main role; 77 episodes
2017–2018	Me declaro culpable	Franco Urzúa	Main role; 62 episodes
2020	Rubí	Héctor Ferrer Garza	Episode: "Video prohibido"
2020-2021	La mexicana y el güero	Tyler (El Güero) Somers	Main role
2023	El amor invencible	Apolo Torrenegro	Recurring role
2024	Tu vida es mi vida	Lorenzo Lugo	
2025	Juegos de amor y poder	Leonardo Vidal	

== Theater ==
- Me fascina mi vecina (2000)
- P.S. Your Cat Is Dead (1999)
- Bajo las sábanas (1997)
- Juego de sociedad (1993–1994)
