= Casados con hijos (Colombian TV series) =

- The Rocha family
- Created by: Michael G. Moye; Ron Leavitt
- Directed by: Ramiro Meneses; Jorg Hiller; Andrés Marroquín
- Starring: Santiago Rodríguez; Lorna Paz; Carlos Humberto Camacho; María Isabel Henao; Lina Luna; Iván González; Luis Miguel González; Jorge Marín
- Country of origin: Colombia
- Original language: Spanish
- No. of episodes: 130 (list of episodes)

Production
- Producer: Asier Aguilar
- Running time: 30 minutes (with commercials)

Original release
- Network: Caracol TV
- Release: October 5, 2004 – March 24, 2006

Related
- Married... with Children; Casados con Hijos (Argentina)

Casados con hijos is the 2004 Colombian remake of the American sitcom Married... with Children. It was produced by Caracol TV and Columbia Pictures subsidiary CPT Holdings.

It features the Rochas (the Colombian version of the Bundys) living in Bogotá with their neighbours, the Pachóns (the D'Arcys), using copied sets and situations from the original series, but adapted to the Colombian urban environment.

This version airs with English subtitles, weekdays in the United States on MTV Tr3́s, an American MTV network aimed at Latinos. It has also aired in Venezuela (Televen) and Ecuador (Ecuavisa).

== Cast ==
- Santiago Rodríguez as Francisco "Paco" Rocha (Al Bundy)
- Lorna Paz / Lorna Cepeda as Dolores Lola de Rocha (Peg Bundy)
- Jorge Marín (2005) as Jefferson (Jefferson D'Arcy)
- Carlos Humberto Camacho (2004) as Óscar Pachón (Steve Rhoades)
- María Isabel Henao as Amparo de Pachón (Marcy D'arcy)
- Lina Luna as Kelly Rocha (Kelly Bundy)
- Iván González (2004) / Miguel González (2005) as Willington "Willy" Rocha (Bud Bundy)
