= Betty, la fea: la historia continúa =

- Genre: Romantic comedy
- Based on: Yo soy Betty, la fea by Fernando Gaitán
- Developed by: Marta Betoldi; Juan Carlos Pérez; César Augusto Betancur
- Written by: Juan Carlos Pérez; Marta Betoldi; César Augusto Betancur; Luis Carlos Ávila; Valeria Gómez; Alejandra Escobar
- Directed by: Mauricio Cruz Fortunato
- Starring: Ana María Orozco; Jorge Enrique Abello
- Composers: Jose Fernández; Martha Lucía Miranda; Juan Pablo Martínez
- Country of origin: Colombia
- Original language: Spanish
- No. of seasons: 3
- No. of episodes: 30

Production
- Executive producers: Juan Pablo Posada; Yalile Giordanelli; Alexander Marín
- Producers: Ana María Orozco; Jorge Enrique Abello
- Editor: Marcela Vásquez
- Production company: RCN Televisión

Original release
- Network: Amazon Prime Video
- Release: 19 July 2024 – present

Betty, la fea: la historia continúa (English: Betty, la fea: The Story Continues) is a Colombian television series produced by RCN Televisión for Amazon Prime Video. The series is a sequel of Yo soy Betty, la fea, the second sequel from that series after Ecomoda. It stars Ana María Orozco and Jorge Enrique Abello. It premiered on 19 July 2024.

In July 2024, the series was renewed for a second season that premiered on 15 August 2025. In September 2025, the series was renewed for a third season that premiered on 28 August 2026. In September 2026, the series was renewed for a fourth and final season.

== Cast ==
=== Main ===
- Ana María Orozco as Beatriz "Betty" Aurora Pinzón Solano
- Jorge Enrique Abello as Armando Mendoza Sáenz
- Mario Duarte as Nicolás Mora Cifuentes
- Lorna Cepeda as Patricia Fernández
- Natalia Ramírez as Marcela Valencia
- Julián Arango as Hugo Lombardi
- Ricardo Vélez as Mario Calderón (seasons 1–2)
- Carlos "Pity" Camacho as Pascual
- Zharick León as María José "Majo" Arriaga López
- Rodrigo Candamil as Esteban Ruiz Castro (seasons 1–2)
- Juanita Molina as Camila "Mila" Mendoza Pinzón
  - María Victoria Rodríguez as child Mila
- Jerónimo Cantillo as Jefferson "Jeff" Muriel Ramírez (seasons 1–2)
- Sebastián Osorio as Ignacio "Nacho" Ortiz Valencia (seasons 1–2)
- Jorge Herrera as Hermes Pinzón Galarza
- Luces Velásquez as Bertha Muñoz de González
- Julio César Herrera as Freddy Stewart Contreras
- Marcela Posada as Sandra Patiño
- Valentina Lagarejo as Carmen Jiménez (seasons 1–2)
- Estefanía Gómez as Aura María Fuentes Rico (season 2–present; guest season 1)
- María Eugenia Arboleda as Mariana Valdés (season 3; guest season 2)
- Diego Cadavid as Román Duarte (season 3)
- Paula Peña as Sofía López (season 3)
- Patrick Delmas as Michel Doinel (season 3)
- Alberto León Jaramillo as Saúl Gutiérrez (season 3)
- Brian Moreno as Ángel Pulido (season 3)
- Geraldine Zivic as Dr. Fernanda (season 3)

=== Recurring ===
- Kepa Amuchastegui as Roberto Mendoza (seasons 1–2)
- Keisy Oviedo as Laura
- Marco Aurelio Vásquez as Daniel (seasons 1–2)
- Adriana Franco as Julia Solano Galindo (season 1; guest season 3)
- Lucho Velasco as El Cacique (season 1)
- Maru Yamayusa as Cuchacha (season 1, 3)
- Javier Pereira as Jorge Serrano (season 2)
- César Mora as Dr. Antonio Sánchez (season 3)
- Fernando Solórzano as Francisco Robledo (season 3)

=== Guests ===
- Pilar Uribe as María Beatriz Valencia (season 1)
- Carlos Duplat as Francisco Santamaría (season 1)
- Martha Isabel Bolaños as Jenny García (season 3)

== Episodes ==
Season	Episodes	Originally released	
Season	Episodes	First released	Last released
1	10	19 July 2024	16 August 2024
2	10	15 August 2025	12 September 2025
3	10	28 August 2026	

=== Season 1 (2024) ===
No. overall	No. in season	Title	Original release date
1	1	"Reunions" (La reconciliación)	19 July 2024
2	2	"Betty Takes Power" (Betty al poder)	19 July 2024
3	3	"Betty, The President" (Betty, presidenta)	26 July 2024
4	4	"Armando Dismantled" (Des-Armando)	26 July 2024
5	5	"Your Prison" (Tu cárcel)	2 August 2024
6	6	"A Long Midsummer Night's Dream" (Sueño de una larga noche de verano)	2 August 2024
7	7	"Box of Memories" (La caja de los recuerdos)	9 August 2024
8	8	"Least Expected Night" (La noche menos pensada)	9 August 2024
9	9	"Blanked Out Cassette" (Borró cassette)	16 August 2024
10	10	"Don't Blame It On The Beach" (No culpes a la playa)	16 August 2024

=== Season 2 (2025) ===
No. overall	No. in season	Title	Original release date
11	1	"Shuffle and Start Over" (Barajar y dar de nuevo)	15 August 2025
12	2	"Eco-wedding" (Ecoboda)	15 August 2025
13	3	"Karmando"	22 August 2025
14	4	"Not Together, Nor Close" (Ni juntos, ni revueltos)	22 August 2025
15	5	"Mission, Vision, Division" (Misión, Visión, División)	29 August 2025
16	6	"All Or Nothing" (Todo o Nada)	29 August 2025
17	7	"Don't Blame It On The Rain" (No culpes a la lluvia)	5 September 2025
18	8	"Artificial Un-Intelligence" (Des-Inteligencia Artificial)	5 September 2025
19	9	"Headquarters On Fire" (Fuego en el cuartel)	12 September 2025
20	10	"Betty is Colombia" (Betty es Colombia)	12 September 2025

=== Season 3 (2026) ===
No. overall	No. in season	Title	Original release date
21	1	"Arrivals and Departures" (Bienvenida y despedida)	28 August 2026
22	2	"Therapy and Trends" (Terapia y tendencia)	28 August 2026
23	3	"Single Woman's Apartment" (Apartamento de señora soltera)	28 August 2026
24	4	"French Revolution" (La revolución francesa)	28 August 2026
25	5	"Old Sparks and Resentments" (El pasado resiente (así, con s))	28 August 2026
26	6	"Clashing and Flirting" (Careos y coquetos)	28 August 2026
27	7	"Angel's Kiss" (Beso de ángel)	28 August 2026
28	8	"Turkish Domestic Product" (Producto interno turco)	28 August 2026
29	9	"Alliances and Ambushes" (Alianzas y asechanzas)	28 August 2026
30	10	"Least Expected Day" (El día menos pensado)	28 August 2026

== Production ==
In April 2023, it was reported that RCN Televisión was developing a sequel to Yo soy Betty, la fea, with the series airing on Amazon Prime Video. The series was ordered on 6 July 2023, with Ana María Orozco and Jorge Enrique Abello reprising their roles. Filming began in August 2023. On 28 September 2023, the complete cast was confirmed. Filming of the first season concluded in December 2023. On 29 July 2024, Amazon Prime Video renewed the series for a second season. On 4 September 2025, Amazon Prime Video renewed the series for a third season. On 24 September 2026 Amazon Prime Video renewed the series for a fourth and final season.

== Release ==
The series premiered on Amazon Prime Video on 19 July 2024. The second season premiered on 15 August 2025. The third season premiered on 28 August 2026.

== Awards and nominations ==
Year	Award	Category	Nominated	Result	Ref
2024	Produ Awards	Best Romantic Comedy Series	Betty, la fea: la historia continúa	Nominated	
2024	Produ Awards	Best Lead Actress - Romantic Comedy Series or Miniseries	Ana María Orozco	Won	
2024	Produ Awards	Best Lead Actor - Romantic Comedy Series or Miniseries	Jorge Enrique Abello	Nominated	
2024	Produ Awards	Best Supporting Actress - Romantic Comedy Series or Miniseries	Lorna Cepeda	Nominated	
2024	Produ Awards	Best Supporting Actor - Romantic Comedy Series or Miniseries	Julián Arango	Nominated	
2024	Produ Awards	Best Screenplay - Comedy Series	Juan Carlos Pérez, César Augusto, Marta Betoldi, Valeria Gómez, Luis Carlos Avila & Alejandra Escobar	Nominated	
2025	India Catalina Awards	Best Series	Betty, la fea: la historia continúa	Nominated	
2025	India Catalina Awards	Best Screenplay	Luis Carlos Ávila, César Betancur, Marta Betoldi, Valeria Gómez & Juan Carlos Pérez	Nominated	
2025	India Catalina Awards	Best Lead Actress	Ana María Orozco	Nominated	
2025	India Catalina Awards	Best Supporting Actress	Lorna Cepeda	Nominated	
2026	India Catalina Awards	Best Supporting Actor	Julián Arango	Nominated	
