= Captain Pantoja and the Special Services (film) =

- Promotional release poster
- Spanish: Pantaleón y las visitadoras
- Directed by: Francisco José Lombardi
- Screenplay by: Giovanna Pollarolo; Enrique Moncloa
- Based on: Captain Pantoja and the Special Service by Mario Vargas Llosa
- Produced by: José Enrique Crousillat
- Starring: Angie Cepeda; Salvador del Solar
- Cinematography: Teo Delgado
- Edited by: Danielle Fillios
- Music by: Bingen Mendizábal
- Release dates: October 1999 (Peru); 30 June 2000 (Spain)
- Running time: 137 minutes
- Countries: Peru; Spain
- Language: Spanish

Captain Pantoja and the Special Services (Spanish: Pantaleón y las visitadoras) is a 1999 comedy-drama film directed by Francisco J. Lombardi from a screenplay written by Giovanna Pollarolo and Enrique Moncloa. It is based on the eponymous comic novel by Mario Vargas Llosa. The film was chosen as Peru's official Best Foreign Language Film submission at the 72nd Academy Awards, but did not manage to receive a nomination.

== Plot ==
The plot follows Captain Pantaleón Pantoja, a straitlaced army captain put in charge of creating a brothel for the army, in order to reduce the incidence of rape surrounding army bases and outposts. The first half of the movie focuses on the humor of the situation, as Pantaleon runs the brothel like an efficient branch of the army. The second half is more dramatic as the captain is changed by running the army brothel and focuses on his relationship with the prostitute Olga "the Colombian".

== Cast ==
- Salvador del Solar as Pantaleón Pantoja
- Angie Cepeda as Olga Arellano "the Colombian"
- Mónica Sánchez as "Pochita"
- Pilar Bardem as "Chuchupe"
- Gianfranco Brero as General Collazos
- Tatiana Astengo as "la Pechuga"
- Norka Ramírez as Vanessa
- Víctor Ángeles as Sargento Panduro

== Production ==
The film is a Peruvian-Spanish co-production, by América Producciones alongside Inca Films and Tornasol Films, with the participation of Vía Digital.

== Release ==
The film premiered in Peru in late 1999. Its Spanish theatrical release was scheduled for 30 June 2000.

The North-American release features a runtime of 119 minutes.

== See also ==
- List of Peruvian films
- List of Spanish films of 2000
