= I Love You Baby (2001 film) =

2001 film by Alfonso Albacete, and David Menkes

- Directed by: Alfonso Albacete; David Menkes
- Written by: Alfonso Albacete; Lucía Etxebarria; David Menkes
- Produced by: Alfonso Albacete; David Menkes; Francisco Ramos
- Starring: Jorge Sanz; Santiago Magill; Tiaré Scanda
- Cinematography: Gonzalo F. Berridi
- Edited by: Miguel Ángel Santamaría
- Music by: M.A. Collado; Paco Ortega
- Distributed by: Strand Releasing; 20th Century Fox
- Release date: 26 October 2001 (Spain)
- Running time: 110 minutes
- Country: Spain
- Language: Spanish

I Love You Baby is a 2001 Spanish gay-themed romantic comedy film.

== Plot ==
Marcos (Jorge Sanz) comes to Madrid to live with his aunt and uncle and work in their restaurant. He dreams of opening a restaurant of his own one day and of finding love. Love he finds in Daniel (Santiago Magill), a struggling young actor. The two quickly fall into a torrid relationship, and Marcos moves in with Daniel. Their love is symbolized by a poster of Boy George that Marcos gives to Daniel, to commemorate where they first kissed (outside a shop where the poster was hanging).

One night the couple is at a karaoke bar and, while they sing a duet, Marcos is injured by a falling disco ball. When he awakens the next day, he is no longer in love with Daniel and has even seemingly become straight. Although he tries for a short time to maintain a relationship with Daniel, eventually he moves back in with his family. He meets Marisol (Tiaré Scanda), a Dominican immigrant, and they fall in love.

Desperate to win Marcos back, Daniel hatches a crazy scheme. He'll dress as a woman and win Marcos away from Marisol. His plan, inevitably, backfires and Daniel is humiliated.

The film ends several years in the future. Marcos and Daniel run into each other at an airport and catch up. Marcos has opened his own restaurant, and he and Marisol are married with several children. Daniel has become a movie star and has also gotten a happy romantic ending, pointing out his new love – Boy George (in a cameo appearance as himself).

== Note ==
The plot device of a disco-ball injury mirrors an incident that happened to Boy George in December 1998, when a 62-pound ball fell from the ceiling of the Bournemouth International Centre, hitting him on the shoulder and knocking him down. George did not, however, become heterosexual as a result.

== Awards and nominations ==
- Torino International Gay & Lesbian Film Festival, Best Feature Film (nominated)

== DVD release ==
I Love You Baby was released on Region 1 DVD on August 26, 2003.
