= Villa Paraíso =

- Genre: Telenovela - Short Form Episodes
- Created by: Alex Hadad
- Directed by: Errol Falcón
- Starring: Ximena Duque; David Chocarro; Silvana Arias; Ricardo Chávez
- Country of origin: United States
- Original language: Spanish
- No. of seasons: 1
- No. of episodes: 20

Production
- Executive producer: Alina Bérriz
- Camera setup: Multi-camera

Original release
- Network: Telemundo
- Release: October 6 – October 31, 2014

Villa Paraíso is an American telenovela produced by Xfinity for Telemundo, which will begin airing from October 6, 2014, through Telemundo. Starring Ximena Duque and David Chocarro as the main protagonists, while Silvana Arias and Ricardo Chávez star as the main antagonists.

== Production ==
In late August 2014, David Chocarro shared through his Twitter account a photo with Ximena Duque, in which the new production of Telemundo confirmed. Recordings from the web-novela began at the end of the recordings on the soap opera "En otra piel", which participated in the Arias and Chocarro.

- Created by – Alex Hadad
- Directed by – Errol Falcón
- Producer – Jose Pérez
- Exec Producer – Alina Bérriz

== Cast ==
- Ximena Duque as Cristina Vidal
- David Chocarro as Sebastián Mejía
- Silvana Arias as Silvia Arteaga
- Ricardo Chávez as Ricardo Castillejo
- Carlos Garin as Gustavo De Armas
- Francisco Porras as Eugenio Mendoza
- Vivian Ruiz
