= Maria i aschimi =

- Genre: Comedy
- Created by: Fernando Gaitán
- Based on: Yo soy Betty, la fea
- Written by: Rozy Riga; Tzo Fragou
- Directed by: Zenia Chrysanidou; Thodoris Konstantopoulos
- Starring: Aggeliki Daliani; Anthimos Ananiadis; Christos Plainis; Tasos Kostis Antigoni Glykofridi
- Theme music composer: Stamatis Kraounakis
- Opening theme: Poso s' agapo by Stamatis Kraounakis
- Country of origin: Greece
- Original language: Greek
- No. of seasons: 2
- No. of episodes: 301

Production
- Producer: On Productions
- Production locations: Athens, Greece
- Running time: 29-33 minutes

Original release
- Network: Mega Channel
- Release: January 1, 2007 – June 23, 2008

Maria i aschimi (Greek: Μαρία η άσχημη; English: Maria the ugly) is a Greek daily romantic comedy television series, produced in 2007–2008, which aired on Mega Channel. The series is the eighth adaptation of the Colombian series Yo soy Betty, la Fea, written by Fernando Gaitán and broadcast from 1999 to 2001 by RCN Televisión.

The script for the Greek version was written by Rozy Riga and Tzo Fragou, while the general editor of the series was Alexandros Rigas and directed by Zenia Chrysanidou and Thodoris Konstantopoulos.

The series premiered on January 1, 2007 in the prime time zone of Mega Channel at 21:00. The first season ended on June 15, 2007 with 102 episodes. The second season of the series premiered on September 17, 2007 in the afternoon zone at 19:10, while the series ended on June 23, 2008 with a triple episode (one episode in the afternoon at 18:50 before the channel's Main News and with a double episode at the time the first season was airing at 21:00 after the channel's Main News) and after broadcasting a total of 301 episodes.

== Plot ==
The main character of the series is Maria, who has an impressive resume and many virtues, but is ugly, clumsy, with a sloppy appearance and unemployed after leaving the national bank as an assistant to the bank manager who retired. Maria worked as an assistant manager for 3 years. Despite the collection of degrees and knowledge she has, Maria constantly receives negative responses wherever she goes, due to her appearance. Disappointed, she decides to try her luck as a simple secretary at the Ecomoda fashion house, which is run by the most sought-after bachelor in Athens, Alexis Mantas, who recently got engaged to Markella Stefanelli. Alexis is impressed by Maria's knowledge, but is intimidated by her appearance. Her main rival is Lilian, a girl with low education and intelligence but with an impressive appearance and also a close friend of Markella. Alexis Mantas eventually hires them both, with Maria performing the secretarial duties.

When the collection that the company launched did not do well, there was a risk of the company being seized by the banks. The solution to the problem was the creation of a ghost company, where it would help "Ecomoda" financially, and then be placed under the management of the company in question. The company was called "Teramoda" and was owned by Maria. "Teramoda" through legal channels takes over Ecomoda, of which it becomes the owner. Alexis pretends to be in love with Maria to make sure she returns Ecomoda to him and so at the end of the first episode he kisses her, something Maria has been waiting for since she met him, but then she was afraid that Maria would find out that the kiss was fake. Eventually, Maria changes her appearance for the better on a trip to Paris, while Alexis truly falls in love with her. The series ends with Maria's marriage to Alexis.

== Cast ==
- Aggeliki Daliani as Maria Papasotiriou
- Anthimos Ananiadis as Alexis Mantas
- Christos Plainis as Dimitris Vrettos
- Tasos Kostis as Iraklis Papasotiriou
- Antigoni Glykofridi as Kaiti Papasotiriou
- Filitsa Kalogerakou as Markella Stefanelli
- Ariel Konstantinidi as Lilian Patrikarea
- Manos Papagiannis as Filippos Deligiannis
- Mathildi Maggira as Eleonora Stefanelli
- Tzina Alimonou as Tzina Kasimati
- Fotis Spyros as Nikolas Markakis
- Thanasis Kourlampas as Sergios Stefanellis
- Maria Filippou as Martha Leventi
- Aspasia Tzitzikaki as Sofia Kanaki
- Magda Tsaggani as Argyro Markaki
- Viky Protogeraki as Christina Petridou-Chatzaki
- Christos Nomikos as Stefanos Mantas (season 1)
- Ilia Lambridou as Margarita Manta (season 1)
- Giannis Evaggelidis as Stefanos Mantas (season 2)
- Teti Schinaki as Margarita Manta (season 2)
- Prodromos Tosounidis as Kristo
- Georgia Kallergi as Loukia
- Iakovos Mylonas as Jerry Linardatos
- Dionysia Tsitiridou as Sandra Danielidi
- Benzie Antegiemo as Didi
- Deborah Odog as Marianna Lagery
- Manos Psistakis as Lefteris
- Zoi Petrou as Angeliki Makrypoulia Katsoumpa
- Markos Madias as Charis Stergiou
- Nikos Kontogiannis as Makis
- Michalis Anthis as Nikos Maroudas
- Thanos Chronis as Odysseas Danezis
- Asimakis Alexiou as Sotiris Seretis (season 1)
- Dimitris Zographakis as Sotiris Seretis (season 2)
- Michalis Giannatos as Nikitas Markakis
- Alexandros Parthenis as Antonis Aslanoglou
- Lina Stavropoulou as Popi
- Panagiotis Kapodistrias as Flouflis
- Maria Myriokefalitaki as Olga
- Konstantinos Sirakis as Timotheos Delaportas
