= Interconexión Eléctrica =

Colombian electric power and highways holding company

Interconexión Eléctrica S.A.
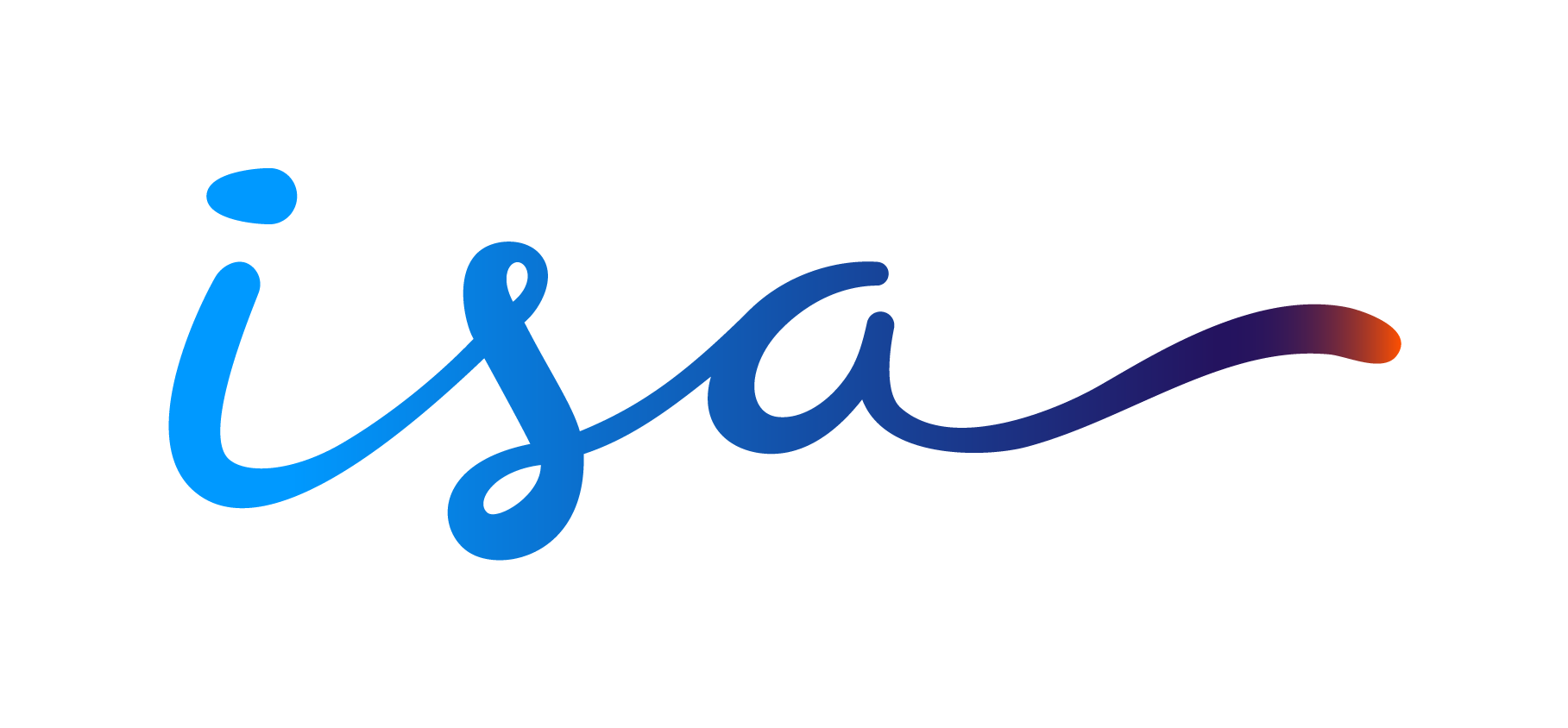
- Type: Sociedad Anónima
- Traded as: BVC: ISA; OTCQX: IESFY
- Industry: Utilities
- Founded: 1967
- Headquarters: Medellín, Colombia
- Area served: Colombia, Peru, Brazil, Bolivia, Chile, Argentina
- Key people: Jorge Andrés Carrillo (CEO)
- Revenue: ▲US$3.3 billion (2023)
- Net income: ▲US$577 million (2023)
- Number of employees: ~4,000
- Parent: Colombian government
- Website: www.isa.co/en/

Interconexión Eléctrica also known as ISA (BVC: ISA, OTCQB: IESFY), is a Colombian company specializing in energy transmission, road concessions, and information and telecommunications infrastructures. It is the largest energy transmission company in Latin America, operating and maintaining high-voltage transmission networks in Colombia, Peru, Bolivia, Brazil and Chile. The group's headquarters are located in the city of Medellín; it comprises 51 subsidiaries and affiliates throughout the Americas.

== History ==
The company was founded in 1967 under President Carlos Lleras Restrepo to connect power stations and enable electricity transmission across Colombia. Official operations began in 1971 with 1,075 km of network linking key substations in Guatapé, Yumbo, La Mesa, and La Esmeralda. Initially focused on transmission, ISA engineered the construction of power plants in 1982 and 1984. Following Colombia's 1992 energy crisis, ISA underwent restructuring under new leadership, led by civil engineer Javier Gutiérrez. The government issued decrees and laws between 1992 and 1994 allowing private sector participation in the electric industry through independent generators, separating it from network transport. From then on, commercialization could be conducted separately or jointly with generation and distribution. To support growth, ISA entered the Colombian Stock Exchange in 2001, raising funds for expansion. On August 20, 2021, Ecopetrol acquired a 51.4% controlling stake in the company, previously held by the Ministry of Finance and Public Credit, establishing a diversified energy conglomerate in South America.

== Operations ==
ISA operates 50,000 km of electricity transmission lines with a total capacity of 92,600 MVA; these activities contribute 80% of the group's total revenue.

Through its subsidiary, ISA Intervial, it operates and maintains 700 km of road infrastructure in Chile. In Colombia, it manages the highway from Cartagena to Barranquilla, with these operations contributing 17% to total revenue.

Through InterNexa, it operates 54,000 km of terrestrial and submarine optical fiber networks.
