= Natalia Ramírez =

Colombian television actress

- Ramírez in 2024
- Born: August 3, 1966 (age 60); Bogotá, Colombia
- Occupation: Actress
- Years active: Since 1988

Natalia Ramírez (born August 3, 1966) is a Colombian television actress. She is best known for her appearance as Marcela Valencia in Yo Soy Betty, la Fea (English: 'I Am Betty, the Ugly'), a comedy-drama telenovela first aired (1999–2001) on RCN TV in Colombia.

== Career ==
In addition to her appearance on Yo Soy Betty, la Fea, Ramírez has since appeared in at least fifteen other television productions. She represented Colombia in the OTI Festival 1998 with the song "Amor por Latinoamérica".

== Filmography ==
=== Television ===
Year	Title	Role	Notes
1987	Décimo grado	Natalia Moncada	
1988-1989	Quieta Margarita	Sara "Sarita" Montiel	
1990	No juegues con mi vida	Amelia Duarte	
1990-1991	El pasado no perdona	Ximena Santamaría	
1991	Muchachitas	Herself	Guest singer
1992	Inseparables	María Belén "Maribel" Peralta	
1992-1993	Lucerito	Angélica Posada	
1993-1994	Mi única verdad	Lina Paz	
1995-1996	Si nos dejan	Cristina Posada	
1996	Las ejecutivas	María Clara Ortega	
1998-1999	El amor es más fuerte	Carolina Toro	
1999-2001	Yo soy Betty, la fea	Marcela Valencia	
2001	Solterita y a la orden	Josefa Barrios	Special participation
2002	Mi pequeña mamá	Chantal Vandervild	
2003	Dr. Amor	Rosario Vargas Bustamante	
2004-2005	Negra consentida	Isabel Vélez de Aristiguieta	
2005	Al filo de la ley	Bárbara Ruíz	
2006	Amor a palos	Magdalena Lam de Soriano	
2008	Novia para dos	Silvia de Rugeles	
2010	Perro amor	Rosario Pinoz de Santana	
2011-2012	Corazón apasionado	Sonia Alcázar de Rey	
2012	Historias clasificadas	Paula	Episode: "Dinero Sucio"
2012-2013	Rosario	Magdalena Pérez Vda. De Miranda	
2013	La prepago	María del Pilar Bustamante	
2015	¿Quién mató a Patricia Soler?	Carmen Sinisterra Rivas	
2016-2017	Las Vega's	Verónica María Bolaños Ríos	
2017	Venganza	Paula Urrea	
2018-2019	La ley del corazón 2	Rebeca de Vallejo	
2020	Enfermeras	Viviana Leyton / Griselda Meneses	
2020	Verdad oculta	Clara de Motta	
2024-present	Betty, la fea: la historia continúa	Marcela Valencia	

=== Reality TV ===
Year	Title	Role
2022	MasterChef Celebrity	Contestant

== Awards and nominations ==
=== TVyNovelas Awards ===
Year	Category	Nominated Work	Result
2001	Best antagonistic actress in a telenovela	Yo soy Betty, la fea	Won
