= Silvana Arias =

Peruvian actress (born 1977)

- Born: Silvana Arias Emmanuel; April 7, 1977 (age 49); Lima, Peru
- Occupation: Actress
- Years active: 1999–2017
- Website: silvanaarias.com

Silvana Arias (born Silvana Arias Emmanuel; April 7, 1977) is a Peruvian actress. She is best known for playing the roles of Susana Peña on María Emilia: Querida (1999), Lucía Reyes on Soledad (2001 to 2002), Jimena Arismendi on Gata salvaje (2002 to 2003), and Paloma Lopez-Fitzgerald on Passions (2004 to 2007).

== Early life ==
Arias was born in Lima, Peru. She is the daughter of theater actor Nelson Arias. Her mother was a social worker. She has two sisters. Arias is fluent in English, Spanish, and Portuguese. She attended Colegio San Antonio IHM in Callao, studying business administration and fashion design. Arias started taking acting roles as a way to earn money to pay for college.

== Career ==
Arias was cast as Susana "Susanita" Peña on the Peruvian telenovela María Emilia: Querida in 1999. She appeared on Pobre Diabla in 2000. Arias played Lucía Reyes on the telenovela Soledad from 2001 to 2002. Arias moved with her family from Peru to Miami, Florida when she was cast as Jimena Arismendi on Gata salvaje. She played the role from 2002 to 2003.

She played Constanza "Coni" Valdez on Amor Descarado in 2003. Arias also made a guest appearance on Karen Sisco. In 2004, she was cast on the NBC soap opera Passions, playing the role of Paloma Lopez-Fitzgerald. She received a Soap Opera Digest Award nomination for Outstanding Female Newcomer in 2005 for her role as Paloma. Arias was on contract with Passions until May 2007. She continued to appear on a recurring basis until August 2007. The role was then recast with Hannia Guillen.

In 2007, Arias appeared in the short film The Trip. In 2008, she was cast in Starting Under, a comedy pilot starring Bernie Mac that wasn't picked up. Arias guest starred on an episode of Cold Case in 2009. She played Lilián Martínez on Encrucijada, a telenovela about health care. In 2010, Arias played Violeta on Pecadora.

In 2010, she had a regular role as Veronica Jessica Murillo 'La Vero' on the Telemundo series Perro amor. She also appeared in the independent film Las Angeles. In 2011, Arias announced that she would be joining the cast of the Nickelodeon series Grachi, playing the role of Ivis. In 2013, she appeared on 11-11: En mi cuadra nada cuadra.

In 2014, Arias had a regular role as Mayte Carvajal on the Telemundo series Part of Me. She starred as Kayden Zwicky in the film The Zwickys. Arias played Silvia Arteaga in the mini-series Villa Paraíso. In 2015, she had a regular role as Raquel on Tómame o déjame. From 2015 to 2016, she played Socorro "Coco" Sanchez on ¿Quién es quién?. In 2017, Arias had a regular role as Bárbara Blanco on La Fan. She also produced and starred in a short film, Mismatch Made in Heaven.

== Personal life ==
Now retired from acting, Arias works in the casting department for Amazon MGM Studios. She has been involved in the casting for projects such as A Million Miles Away and The Bills.

She continues to work in design. She has a podcast for Latin women, Neo Mujer USA.

== Filmography ==
=== Film ===
Year	Title	Role	Notes
2007	The Trip	Silvana	Short film
2010	Las Angeles	Marta	
2014	Locas y Atrapadas	Sabrina	
2014	The Zwickys	Kayden Zwicky	
2016	The Jump	Maria	Short film
2017	In the Light	Natalia Cortez	Short film Also executive producer
2017	Mismatch Made in Heaven	Melany	Short film Also executive producer

=== Television ===
Year	Title	Role	Notes
1999	María Emilia: Querida	Susana "Susanita" Peña	150 episodes
2000	Pobre Diabla	Carmen	Episode: "1.1"
2001–2002	Soledad	Lucía Reyes	117 episodes
2002–2003	Gata salvaje	Jimena Arismendi	251 episodes
2003	Amor Descarado	Constanza "Coni" Valdez	Episode: "Inicia la confusión"
2003	Karen Sisco	Girl with Herve	Episode: "The One That Got Away"
2004–2007	Passions	Paloma Lopez-Fitzgerald	148 episodes
2008	Starting Under	Rosa	Unaired pilot
2009	Cold Case	Piedad Luque	Episode: "Stealing Home"
2009	Encrucijada	Lilián Martínez	
2010	Pecadora	Violeta	Episode: "1.1"
2010	Perro amor	Veronica Jessica Murillo "La Vero"	108 episodes
2012	Grachi	Ivis	32 episodes
2013	The Glades	Sara	Episode: "Yankee Dan"
2013	11-11: En mi cuadra nada cuadra	Mariana Valle	Episode: "Bienvenido a 11-11"
2014	Part of Me	Mayte Carvajal	123 episodes
2014	Villa Paraíso	Silvia Arteaga	TV mini-series 20 episodes
2015	Tómame o déjame	Raquel	10 episodes
2015–2016	¿Quién es quién?	Socorro "Coco" Sanchez	66 episodes
2017	La Fan	Bárbara Blanco	57 episodes
2017	Milagros de Navidad	Lolita	TV mini-series 1 episode
