= Betty Toons =

Colombian animated series based on Yo soy Betty, la fea

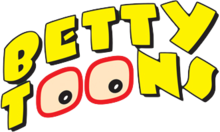
- Genre: Animated series; Comedy
- Created by: Liliana Guzmán; Héctor Moncada (adaptation)
- Based on: Yo soy Betty, la fea by Fernando Gaitán
- Directed by: Hernán A. Zajec; Maribel Echeverría
- Music by: Juancho Pulido (original)
- Country of origin: Colombia
- Original language: Spanish
- No. of seasons: 1
- No. of episodes: 60

Production
- Producers: María del Pilar Fernández; Raúl Tinjacá
- Production locations: Bogotá, Colombia
- Editor: Edwin López
- Production companies: Conexión Creativa; RCN Televisión

Original release
- Network: RCN
- Release: 2002 – 2003

Related
- Yo soy Betty, la fea (original series)

Betty Toons is a Colombian animated television series produced by RCN Televisión in 2002, based on Fernando Gaitán's soap opera Yo soy Betty, la fea, retrofitting all the characters to make them children living in a primary school. After the great success of the transmission of this telenovela in 1999 until 2001, the idea of the production of the animated series by RCN Televisión came about. The series lasted a year on the air.

The voice direction was done by Hernán A. Zajec and Maribel Echeverría. The musical direction was by Juancho Pulido and the logistics were in charge with Paula Arenas.

In the United States, Betty Toons aired on Telefutura from 2004 to 2007 in Spanish.

The cartoon version recreates the era of the protagonists in childhood, when everyone attends the same school, including Beatriz Pinzón or Betty, Armando Mendoza, "La Peliteñida", Marcela Valencia, the teacher Gutiérrez, who sometimes uses English words when he is talking.

This is the first time that a Colombian animated series is aired on Cartoon Network and Boomerang in Latin America, on November 7, 2004 and ended on December 17, 2006.

In Mexico, the series was shown on Canal de las Estrellas between 2004 and 2006.

The series was re-aired on February 17, 2018 and January 6, 2019 again by RCN, and was also shown Tacho Pistacho channel.

== Plot ==
One day a girl dressed as Betty goes to school who constantly gets made fun of for her looks. The series is very similar to the original telenovela, but they go to school and Armando does not work at EcoModa yet. Hugo Lombardi is not included as a character in this version. The series ends with Betty being an exchange student and moves to France, on the airplane she meets a new boy.

== Voice cast and characters ==
- Alejandra Botero as Beatriz "Betty" Aurora Pinzón Solano.
- Andrés López as Nicolás Mora; Daniel Valencia; Freddy
- Alberto León Jaramillo as Profesor Gutiérrez
- Juan Gaviria as Armando Mendoza Sáenz
- Marcela Jiménez as Marcela Valencia
- Juliana Botero as Patricia Fernández
- Marta Noriega as Mario Calderón
- Luz Amparo Álvarez as Aura María Fuentes; Sofía López
- Martha Araujo as Bertha Muñoz; Julia Solano de Pinzón
- José Ordóñez as Hermes Pinzón
- Martha Ginneth Rincón as Sandra Patiño
- Giovanna Bernal as Mariana Valdés
- María Mercedes Murillo as Doña Nicolasa
