= Captain Pantoja and the Special Service =

1973 novel by Mario Vargas Llosa

- First Spanish edition (publ. Seix Barral)
- Author: Mario Vargas Llosa
- Original title: Pantaleón y las visitadoras
- Language: Spanish
- Genre: Comedic novel
- Publication date: 1973

Captain Pantoja and the Special Service (Spanish: Pantaleón y las visitadoras; 1973) is a relatively short comedic novel by acclaimed Peruvian writer Mario Vargas Llosa.

The story takes place in the Peruvian department of Amazonas, where troops from the Peruvian Army are attended to by prostitutes, referred to euphemistically in the Spanish term visitadora, meaning “visitor” and in juridical terms it means “auditor”, "inspector" or "examiner".

According to the author himself, the work is based on facts, as he was able to verify them in 1958 and in 1962 when he travelled to the Peruvian jungle. It deals with Captain Pantoja's (from whom the novel's title takes its name) astonishing efficiency campaign to provide prostitution services for quelling the sexual desires of the Peruvian army soldiers stationed in what is portrayed as an incredibly aphrodisiacal Amazon jungle.

== Plot ==
The novel narrates the story of Peruvian Army Captain Pantaleón Pantoja, whose superiors involve him, despite his reluctance, in a mission to satisfy the sex drives of soldiers stationed in the Peruvian department of Amazons. Pantoja is chosen to carry out the mission by virtue of being a model soldier, free from vices and without children of his own.

At first Pantaleón rejects the idea since it contradicts his principles, but nonetheless finds himself forced to carry it out. He decides to clean up the zone and military base since they are in terrible condition, and does not say anything to his wife Pochita, since his mission is top secret.

The services—which are designated by the term “benefits”—that Pantoja tries to provide are called Servicio de Visitadoras para Guarniciones, Puestos de Frontera y Afines (SVGPFA) (Audit Services for Garrisons and Border-Related Posts), and consist in supplying prostitutes (“visitadoras”) to the barracks in Iquitos, where they are supposed to sexually satisfy the enlisted soldiers first, and to then be made available to the officers, while being an entirely secret matter. Among these prostitutes is a very seductive woman, Olga Arellano (nicknamed “the Brazilian”), who becomes involved with Pantaleón, as the latter winds up being unfaithful to Pochita.

Pantaleón is a man who is drowned by the solidity of his principles.—Mario Vargas Llosa

After “the Brazilian” is assassinated by a group of furious locals, Pantaleón shows up at her funeral dressed in military uniform (thus going public with the nature of the audit services and revealing the secret which he was obliged to keep) in order to raise the morale of the prostitutes. Due to the SVGPFA receiving a series of internal and external complaints from the Army, Pantaleón is thus forced to shut down the service under pressure from his superiors. The ensuing complication leads him to believe that his military career has come to an end, but his superiors grant him a last chance and send him far away, to Lake Titicaca (Peruvian Andes), to take charge of a garrison located there.

== Novel characters ==
- Pantaleón Pantoja, Panta
- Francisca, Pochita
- Olga Arellano, La Brasileña (the Brazilian one), known as La Colombiana (the Colombian one) in the 2000 film adaptation
- Leonor Curinchilla, Chuchupe
- Chupito
- Luisa Cánepa, Pechuga
- Peludita
- Porfirio Wong, Chino
- Sargento López
- Tigre Collazos

== Film adaptations ==
The novel was adapted into two films. The first was made in 1975 and was co-directed by Mario Vargas Llosa himself. The second film was made in 2000 and was directed by Francisco J. Lombardi.
