= Lorna Cepeda =

Colombian actress

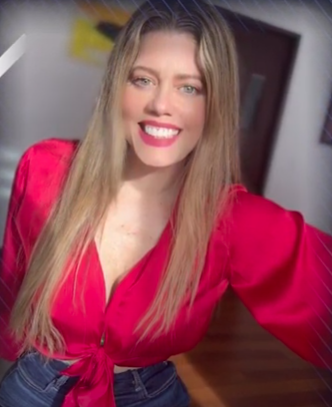
- Born: Lorna María Cepeda Jiménez; Cartagena, Colombia
- Occupation: Actress
- Years active: 1993–present
- Relatives: Angie Cepeda (sister)

Lorna María Cepeda Jiménez is a Colombian actress. Best known for her role in the famous Colombian Soap Opera Yo soy Betty, la fea (I'm Betty, the ugly one), also known as simply Betty la fea (Ugly Betty) from which more than a dozen versions have been made in other countries, including the American series Ugly Betty.

== Biography ==
Lorna Cepeda was born in Cartagena, Colombia. Her entrance to show business started in Barranquilla at the age of 16. Lorna Cepeda started modeling in Diana de Biasse's academy. In 1993 she met Viena Ruiz, Irma Aristizabal and Tony Marquez, who were the owners of Stock Models Agency.

They predicted good prospects for her in Bogota. A year later Lorna Cepeda moved to that city and a new stage of her life started. Lorna Cepeda worked in Bogota until 1997. In this year she started studying to become an actress. Her first appearance was in the sitcom "Padres e Hijos" interpreting Magaly. She also participated in the comedy "Dulce Martirio" where she assumed the principal role. In the series "El Dia de Hoy" she played Catalina. In 1998, Lorna Cepeda joined the cast of "Castillo de Naipes". In "El amor es mas fuerte" she played Natalia and Juliana in "Amor en forma". "Yo soy Betty la fea" increased her popularity in 1999 and really brought her fame.

She is the sister of Angie Cepeda, who is also an actress.

== Career ==
=== Soap operas ===
- Dulce martirio as Martirio
- El día es hoy as Catalina
- El amor es más fuerte as Natalia
- Amor en forma as Juliana
- Yo soy Betty, la fea as Patricia Fernández
- Provócame as Margarita
- Mi pequeña mamá as Cassandra
- Bésame tonto
- Doctor amor
- La diva as Victoria
- Chepe Fortuna as La celosa

=== Series ===
- Padres e hijos as Magali
- Casados con hijos as Lola
- Guayoyo express
- Amor, Mentiras y Video as Angela
- Hasta que la Plata nos Separe as Rosaura Echeverr
- Amas de casa desesperadas as Leonor Guerrero (Lynette Scavo)
- Betty, la fea: la historia continúa as Patricia Fernández

=== Film ===
- En alquiler

=== Theater ===
- Estado civil infiel

=== Television ads ===
- Sprite
- Chiclets Adams
- Limonada Postobon
- Oster (2001–2002)
- Alpina
- Cel Caribe, Barranquilla (2001–2002)
