= Celmira Luzardo =

Colombian actress (1952–2014)

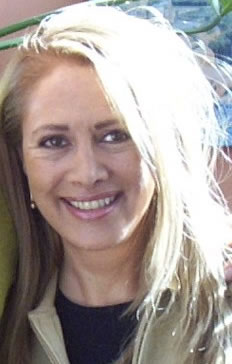
- October 2002
- Born: Celmira Luzardo Montenegro; 31 March 1952; Bogotá, Colombia
- Died: 12 March 2014 (aged 61); Bogotá, Colombia
- Occupation: Actress
- Years active: 1971–2004
- Spouse: Juan Escobar López (his death)
- Children: 1

Celmira Luzardo Montenegro (31 March 1952 – 12 March 2014) was a Colombian actress. She was noted for her performance in the soap operas La tregua (1980), La potra zaina (1994), Yo soy Betty, la fea (1999).

== Biography ==
Luzardo was born on 31 March 1952 in Bogotá. She was the younger sister of cinematographer Julio Luzardo and the actress Consuelo Luzardo. Initially, Luzardo expressed interest in studying engineering, but abandoned her studies to pursue her passion for acting in stage and screen. She joined the British Film Institute in London to study editing and montage. Luzardo studied film at the Centro Sperimentale di Cinematografia in Rome.

Her first appearance on television was in Volverás a mis brazos, a 1971 Colombian telenovela. Six years later, she participated in the series Esposos en vacaciones. In 1999, Luzardo played the character of Catalina Angel in the telenovela Yo soy Betty, la fea. who is responsible for guiding Betty, the lead character, to improve her style and appearance. On the big screen under director Gustavo Nieto Roa she provided voices in the films Esposos en vacaciones and Colombian Connection. Luzardo also took part in plays like Rosa de dos aromas In the final years of her life, Luzardo retired from acting in film and television, establishing residency in San Andrés, but later moved to her hometown of Bogotá, due to health problems. She died on 12 March 2014 in Bogotá after suffering from respiratory complications resulting from stomach cancer.

== Filmography ==
- Yo soy Betty, la fea (1999)
- Francisco el matemático (1999)
- El amor es más fuerte (1998)
- La Mujer del Presidente (1997)
- Cazados (1996)
- La potra zaina (1993)
- La quinta hoja del trebol (1992)
- Herencia maldita (1990)
- Los cuervos (1984–1986)
- La sombra de otra (1988)
- Colombian Connection (1979)
- Esposos en vacaciones (1977)
- Volverás a mis brazos (1971)
