= Rigo (TV series) =

- Genre: Telenovela
- Based on: Rigo by Andrés López
- Developed by: Cesar Augusto Betancur
- Written by: Cesar Augusto Betancur; Sandra Motato
- Directed by: Catalina Hernández; Juan Carlos Mazo
- Starring: Juan Pablo Urrego; Ana María Estupiñán; Robinson Díaz
- Composer: Rafael García
- Country of origin: Colombia
- Original language: Spanish
- No. of seasons: 1
- No. of episodes: 99

Production
- Executive producer: Ana María Pérez Martínez
- Producer: Fabio Cuéllar
- Editor: Adriana Falla
- Production company: RCN Televisión

Original release
- Network: Canal RCN
- Release: 9 October 2023 – 15 April 2024

Rigo is a Colombian biographical telenovela produced by RCN Televisión. It tells the story of road racing cyclist Rigoberto Urán, played by Juan Pablo Urrego, inspired by the book Rigo written by Andrés López. It aired from 9 October 2023 to 15 April 2024.

== Cast ==
- Juan Pablo Urrego as Rigoberto Urán
- Ana María Estupiñán as Michelle Durango
- Robinson Díaz as Rigoberto de Jesús Urán
- Ramiro Meneses
- Julián Arango
- Ella Becerra
- Andrea Guzmán
- Sandra Reyes as Aracely Urán de Urán
- Emanuel Restrepo
- Sebastián Toro
- Sebastián Gutiérrez
- Yesenia Valencia
- Mauricio Mejía
- Ricardo Vesga
- Vivian Ossa
- Elizabeth Chavarriaga
- Stephania Duque as Adriana

== Production ==
In December 2021, the series was announced as part of Canal RCN's programming for 2022. Filming of the series began on 23 March 2023.

== Episodes ==
| No. | Title | Original release date | Colombia viewers (Rating points) |
|---|---|---|---|
| 1 | "El hijo de Urrao" | 9 October 2023 | 7.2 |
| 2 | "El amor llega de golpe" | 9 October 2023 | 7.2 |
| 3 | "El poder de un buen hablador" | 10 October 2023 | 6.8 |
| 4 | "La envidia afecta a los Urán" | 10 October 2023 | 6.8 |
| 5 | "La desconfianza trae problemas" | 11 October 2023 | 5.8 |
| 6 | "Los chismes tocan la puerta de los Urán" | 13 October 2023 | 6.0 |
| 7 | "Nace un sueño" | 18 October 2023 | 6.5 |
| 8 | "Urrao se hunde en el conflicto" | 19 October 2023 | 7.0 |
| 9 | "Rigo se enfrenta a las adversidades" | 20 October 2023 | 6.0 |
| 10 | "Nada es un obstáculo para Rigo" | 23 October 2023 | 7.2 |
| 11 | "Carmelo provoca la rabia de Rigo" | 24 October 2023 | 7.3 |
| 12 | "Rigo se propone sorprender a Pedro" | 25 October 2023 | 7.1 |
| 13 | "Rigo no se vara por nada" | 26 October 2023 | 7.2 |
| 14 | "La primera caída es un gran aprendizaje" | 27 October 2023 | 6.5 |
| 15 | "Rigo demuestra por qué es un triunfador" | 30 October 2023 | 7.4 |
| 16 | "De eso tan bueno, no dan tanto" | 31 October 2023 | 5.5 |
| 17 | "Lucho asume una gran promesa" | 1 November 2023 | 8.0 |
| 18 | "Soñar no cuesta nada" | 2 November 2023 | 6.9 |
| 19 | "Berenice se enfrenta a Evaristo" | 3 November 2023 | 6.4 |
| 20 | "Los Urán están entre la espada y la pared" | 7 November 2023 | 7.3 |
| 21 | "Asumiendo riesgos por la familia" | 8 November 2023 | 7.9 |
| 22 | "La competencia de Rigo" | 9 November 2023 | 6.8 |
| 23 | "Preocupaciones de una madre" | 10 November 2023 | 6.5 |
| 24 | "El triste adiós de Don Rigo" | 14 November 2023 | 7.2 |
| 25 | "Viviendo en la zozobra" | 15 November 2023 | 7.3 |
| 26 | "La salud de Aracely preocupa a su familia" | 17 November 2023 | 6.9 |
| 27 | "Aracely le da una luz de esperanza a Rigo" | 20 November 2023 | 8.0 |
| 28 | "Evaristo daña la tranquilidad de los Urán" | 22 November 2023 | 7.7 |
| 29 | "Rigo enfrenta un camino lleno de trampas" | 23 November 2023 | 7.6 |
| 30 | "Una motivación divina" | 24 November 2023 | 7.5 |
| 31 | "Michelle admite sus sentimientos" | 27 November 2023 | 8.6 |
| 32 | "Nuevos caminos tocan la puerta" | 28 November 2023 | 8.3 |
| 33 | "Evaristo da la cara a la comunidad" | 29 November 2023 | 7.5 |
| 34 | "Una madre siempre tiene la razón" | 30 November 2023 | 7.1 |
| 35 | "Rigo está para grandes cosas" | 1 December 2023 | 7.5 |
| 36 | "Un paseo lleno de problemas" | 4 December 2023 | 7.5 |
| 37 | "Cuando el amor es correspondido" | 5 December 2023 | 8.4 |
| 38 | "La mala suerte de los Durango" | 6 December 2023 | 6.9 |
| 39 | "Rigo demuestra su valentía" | 7 December 2023 | 3.7 |
| 40 | "Evaristo se sale con la suya" | 12 December 2023 | 7.6 |
| 41 | "Rigo recibe una desagradable bienvenida" | 13 December 2023 | 6.4 |
| 42 | "Un ángel protege a Rigo" | 14 December 2023 | 7.2 |
| 43 | "Michelle muestra su temple" | 15 December 2023 | 6.4 |
| 44 | "Rigo sigue cosechando éxitos" | 18 December 2023 | 6.8 |
| 45 | "Michelle no controla sus celos" | 19 December 2023 | 7.1 |
| 46 | "El amor causa discusiones" | 20 December 2023 | 6.5 |
| 47 | "La angustia de Aracely" | 21 December 2023 | 7.1 |
| 48 | "La mala suerte de los Urán" | 22 December 2023 | 5.8 |
| 49 | "La jugada de Adriana con Rigo" | 29 January 2024 | 9.0 |
| 50 | "Una desagradable sorpresa" | 30 January 2024 | 7.7 |
| 51 | "En busca del perdón" | 31 January 2024 | 7.4 |
| 52 | "Michelle toma una radical decisión" | 1 February 2024 | 8.5 |
| 53 | "La nueva estrategia de Evaristo" | 2 February 2024 | 6.9 |
| 54 | "La ilusión de los nuevos comienzos" | 5 February 2024 | 8.2 |
| 55 | "Ricardo queda fascinado con Michelle" | 6 February 2024 | 7.4 |
| 56 | "La ambición no se detiene" | 7 February 2024 | 7.0 |
| 57 | "Una brillante idea" | 8 February 2024 | 7.9 |
| 58 | "La novia indicada" | 9 February 2024 | 7.7 |
| 59 | "Una fiesta llena de sorpresas" | 12 February 2024 | 9.3 |
| 60 | "Otra decepción para Michelle" | 13 February 2024 | 7.7 |
| 61 | "Paola recibe una gran oferta laboral" | 14 February 2024 | 8.0 |
| 62 | "Tras exponer a Rigo, Evaristo se sale con la suya" | 15 February 2024 | 8.9 |
| 63 | "Una nueva discusión entre Rigo y Michelle" | 16 February 2024 | 7.2 |
| 64 | "Michelle presume a su nuevo pretendiente" | 19 February 2024 | 8.2 |
| 65 | "Rigo conoce al pretendiente de Michelle" | 20 February 2024 | 7.7 |
| 66 | "Berenice anima a Rigo tras su decepción amorosa" | 21 February 2024 | 7.5 |
| 67 | "Carmelo Rendón volvió con sed de venganza a Urrao" | 22 February 2024 | 7.1 |
| 68 | "Una fiscal llega a Urrao para investigar el caso de Evaristo" | 23 February 2024 | 7.0 |
| 69 | "Evaristo Rendón volvió sano y salvo a Urrao" | 26 February 2024 | 8.4 |
| 70 | "Evaristo enfrenta a Tiberio" | 27 February 2024 | 7.9 |
| 71 | "El inicio de un gran sueño" | 28 February 2024 | 8.6 |
| 72 | "Isidro es el responsable de atentar contra Evaristo" | 29 February 2024 | 8.0 |
| 73 | "Rigo vuelve a Urrao" | 1 March 2024 | 8.1 |
| 74 | "Una inesperada despedida" | 4 March 2024 | 9.5 |
| 75 | "Michelle termina con Ricardo" | 5 March 2024 | 9.7 |
| 76 | "Se frustra un sueño" | 6 March 2024 | 9.4 |
| 77 | "Inicia un plan secreto" | 7 March 2024 | 9.4 |
| 78 | "No todo está perdido" | 8 March 2024 | 8.1 |
| 79 | "Dos sueños cumplidos" | 11 March 2024 | 10.0 |
| 80 | "Una propuesta ambiciosa" | 12 March 2024 | 9.4 |
| 81 | "Una meta casi imposible" | 13 March 2024 | 9.3 |
| 82 | "No salió el malvado plan" | 14 March 2024 | 9.9 |
| 83 | "Los presentimientos no fallaron" | 15 March 2024 | 8.3 |
| 84 | "La verdad sale a la luz" | 18 March 2024 | 9.1 |
| 85 | "El falso romance" | 19 March 2024 | 9.5 |
| 86 | "Un sueño hecho realidad" | 20 March 2024 | 9.6 |
| 87 | "Un alma en el cuerpo de un ángel" | 21 March 2024 | 9.5 |
| 88 | "Una medida desesperada" | 22 March 2024 | 8.8 |
| 89 | "Una amistad incondicional" | 1 April 2024 | 8.4 |
| 90 | "Marcando territorio" | 2 April 2024 | 8.8 |
| 91 | "Un triste final" | 3 April 2024 | 9.4 |
| 92 | "Un corazón con resentimiento" | 4 April 2024 | 9.3 |
| 93 | "La secuela de una caída" | 5 April 2024 | 8.0 |
| 94 | "Una triste noticia" | 8 April 2024 | 10.0 |
| 95 | "Una boda se aproxima" | 9 April 2024 | 8.6 |
| 96 | "Embarazo a la vista" | 10 April 2024 | 9.4 |
| 97 | "Una fuerte verdad" | 11 April 2024 | 9.3 |
| 98 | "Una nueva vida" | 12 April 2024 | 9.1 |
| 99 | "Felices para siempre" | 15 April 2024 | 10.5 |

== Reception ==
=== Ratings ===
| Season | Timeslot (COT) | Episodes | First aired | | Last aired | | Avg. viewers (in points) |
| Season | Timeslot (COT) | Episodes | Date | Viewers (in points) | Date | Viewers (in points) | Avg. viewers (in points) |
|---|---|---|---|---|---|---|---|
| 1 | Mon–Fri 8:00 p.m. | 99 | 9 October 2023 | 7.2 | 15 April 2024 | 10.5 | 7.7 |

=== Awards and nominations ===
| Year | Award | Category | Nominated | Result | Ref |
|---|---|---|---|---|---|
| 2024 | Produ Awards | Best Telenovela | Rigo | Nominated | |
| 2024 | Produ Awards | Best Lead Actor - Telenovela | Juan Pablo Urrego | Won | |
| 2024 | Produ Awards | Best Supporting Actor - Telenovela | Julián Arango | Won | |
| 2024 | Produ Awards | Best Directing - Superseries or Telenovela | Juan Carlos Mazo & Catalina Hernández | Won | |
