= Pobre Diabla (Peruvian TV series) =

- Created by: América Producciónes
- Written by: Luis Felipe Alvarado; Delia Fiallo; Alberto Migré; Ximena Suárez
- Directed by: Rubén Gerbasi
- Starring: Angie Cepeda; Salvador del Solar; Arnaldo André; María Cristina Lozada
- Opening theme: Pobre diabla by Maritza Rodríguez
- Composer: Jorge Tafur
- Country of origin: Peru
- Original language: Spanish
- No. of episodes: 180

Production
- Executive producer: Malú Crousillat
- Producers: José Enrique Crousillat; Carla Delfino; Alberto Giarroco; Michella León
- Cinematography: Rafael Ruiz
- Running time: 45 minutes

Original release
- Network: América Televisión
- Release: May 2, 2000 – January 2, 2001

Related
- María Emilia: Querida; Milagros

Pobre diabla (Poor Devil) is a Peruvian telenovela which starred Angie Cepeda, Salvador del Solar, Arnaldo André and María Cristina Lozada. It was produced by América Producciónes and broadcast on América Televisión in 2000.

== Cast ==
- Angie Cepeda ..... Fiorella Morelli viuda de Mejía Guzmán
- Salvador del Solar ..... Andres Mejía Guzmán Jr.
- Arnaldo André ..... Andres Mejía Guzmán
- María Cristina Lozada ..... Roberta viuda de Mejía Guzmán. Villain
- Teddy Guzmán ..... Caridad López
- Camucha Negrete ..... Chabuca Flores de Morelli
- Ricardo Fernández ..... Luciano Morelli
- Katia Condos ..... Paula Mejía Guzmán
- Martha Figueroa ..... Patricia Mejía Guzmán de Hernández-Marín
- Hernán Romero ..... Diego Hernández-Marín. Villain
- Santiago Magill ..... Christian Mejía Guzmán
- Vanessa Saba ..... Rebeca Montenegro. Villain
- Javier Valdés ..... César Barrios
- Rossana Fernández Maldonado ..... Sandra Palacios
- Julián Legaspi ..... Luis Alberto Miller
- Carlos Victoria ..... Oscar Sandoval
- Gabriel Anselmi ..... José Guillen "Pichón"
- Erika Villalobos ..... Karina Linares
- Jesús Delaveaux ..... Orzabal
- Silvana Arias ..... Carmen
- Bruno Odar ..... Mario Paredes
- Ernesto Cabrejos ..... Antonio Jiménez
- Sergio Galliani ..... Garaban. Villain
- Ebelin Ortiz ..... Norma
- José Luis Ruiz ..... Joaquín Vallejo. Villain
- Elvira de la Puente ..... Elvira Moncayo
- Angelita Velasquez ..... Mercedes Farfan
- María Angélica Vega ..... Barbara Matos. Villain
- Maricielo Effio ..... Ofelia Caceres
- Haydee Caceres ..... Rufina Pérez
- Gianfranco Brero ..... Dr. Octavio Tapia
- Gilberto Torres ..... Chaveta
- Cecilia Rechkemmer ..... Silvana
- Javier Delgiudice
- Carlos Mesta ..... Juan Marquez
- Gabriela Billotti ..... Ana María Torreblanca
- Tatiana Espinoza ..... Ernestina
- Kareen Spano
- Miguel Medina ..... Malandro
- Carlos Alcántara ..... Ramón Pedraza
- Antonio Arrue
- María José Zaldivar ..... Sor Angelina
- Mari Pili Barreda ..... Nini
- William Bell Taylor
- Gian Piero Mubarak ..... Carlitos Hernández-Marín Mejía-Guzmán
- Lucia Oxenford ..... Patty Hernández-Marín Mejía-Guzmán

== Broadcasting ==
Country	TV network(s)	Series premiere	Series end
Lebanon	LBCI		
Peru	América Televisión	May 2, 2000	January 2, 2001
Serbia	3K (RTS)	October 26, 2001	2002
Slovakia	TV JOJ	May 4, 2002	September 9, 2003
Malaysia	TV3 (Malaysia)	September 16, 2003	August 3, 2004
Georgia	First Channel		

=== Americas ===
- Argentina: Channel 10 Avellaneda and Cablevisión
- Bolivia: Red PAT
- Chile: Chilevisión
- Colombia: Caracol Televisión and Novelas Caracol
- Costa Rica: Teletica y Repretel
- Ecuador: Televicentro
- El Salvador: TCS Canal 6
- Guatemala: Canal 13 of Ciudad de Guatemala
- Mexico: TVC Networks
- Nicaragua: Channel 2
- Panamá: Telemetro
- Paraguay: Paravisión Channel 5 Asunción and Unicanal
- Perú: Panamericana Televisión y RBC Televisión
- Uruguay: Channel 7 Montevideo and Multiseñal
- Venezuela: Televen

=== Europe ===
- Spain:
- Italy:
- United Kingdom: Channel 5
- Germany: ZDF
- Serbia: 3K (RTS)
- Slovakia: TV JOJ
- Bulgaria: Eurocom TV
- Sweden:
- Poland:
- Greece:Star Channel (2000, 2003)
- Slovenia: Kanal A

=== Middle East ===
- LBC Channels & Dubai TV (Dubbed into Arabic & Named: Fiorella) (175 Episodes)
