= Julián Arango =

Colombian actor

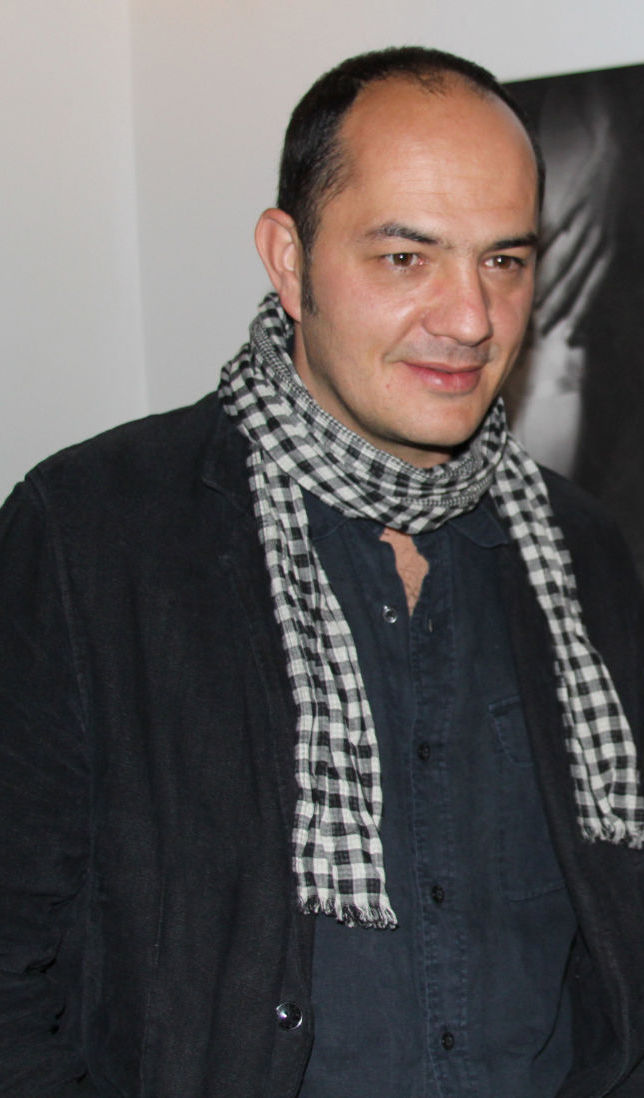
- Born: Julián Arango Robledo; October 6, 1968 (age 57); Bogotá, Colombia
- Years active: 1980–present
- Spouse: Ana María Orozco (m. 1999; div. 2000)

Julián Arango Robledo (born October 6, 1969) is a Colombian television actor.

He is best known to fans around the world for his role as the temperamental fashion designer Hugo Lombardi in the Colombian mega-hit telenovela Yo soy Betty, la fea and its spinoff Ecomoda.

In April 1999, he married his Yo soy Betty, la fea co-star, Ana María Orozco. The marriage was short-lived, and the couple divorced in 2000.

In 2014, he played Henry Navarro, a Spanish-language adaptation of Breaking Bad's Hank Schrader, on Metástasis.

== Filmograph ==
- Betty, la fea: la historia continúa....Hugo Lombardi
- Rigo (2023).... Evaristo Rendón
- El man es Germán (2019)....Hernando Perez
- Metástasis (2015)
- El Cartel de los Sapos (2011)
- Infiltrados (2011) ... Major Ramón García
- Las muñecas de la mafia (2009)....Claudio
- Adiós, Ana Elisa (2008) .... Calvo .... aka Te amo Ana Elisa
- El cartel de los sapos (2008) .... Guadaña
- Tiempo final (2008) .... Santiago
- Amas de Casa Desesperadas (2007) .... Tomas Aguilar
- Amores cruzados (2006) .... Santiago Rincón
- Ecomoda (2001) .... Hugo Lombardi
- El inútil (2001) .... Martin Martinez
- Yo soy Betty, la fea (1999) .... Hugo Lombardi
- Perro amor (1998) .... Antonio Brando
- Tiempos difíciles (1995) .... Juan Diego Ramos Perfetti
- Narcos (2015-2017)... Orlando Henao Montoya

== See also ==
- Betty la fea
