= At Close Distance =

- Directed by: Grigoriy Dobrygin
- Written by: Anton Yarush; Grigoriy Dobrygin
- Produced by: Grigoriy Dobrygin; Daniel Goroshko
- Starring: Kseniya Rappoport; Nurbol Uulu Kayratbek; Petr Rykov
- Cinematography: Kseniya Sereda (ru)
- Edited by: Dmitriy Kubasov
- Music by: Igor Vdovin (ru)
- Production companies: Mind the GAP Productions; Kinoprime Foundation; A-One Films Baltic; Lietuvos Respublikos kulturos ministerija
- Distributed by: White Nights
- Release date: December 2, 2021
- Running time: 94 minutes
- Countries: Russia; Lithuania
- Language: Russian

At Close Distance, also known or At Close Range (Russian: На близком расстоянии, romanized: Na blizkom rasstoyanii) is a 2021 Russian-Lithuanian drama film directed by Grigoriy Dobrygin.

== Plot ==
The film tells about a successful actress who met an unconscious migrant in her house and she decides to take him to her place, but with one condition...

== Cast ==
- Kseniya Rappoport
- Nurbol Uulu Kayratbek
- Petr Rykov
- Viktoriya Miroshnichenko
- Aytunuk Zulpukarova
- Nikita Taddei
- Oleg Glushkov
