= Santiago Magill =

Peruvian actor (born 1977)

Santiago Magill Moreno (born 17 January 1977 in Lima, Peru) is a Peruvian actor who acts in soap-opera, TV series and films.

== Selected filmography ==
- Malicia (1995) (TV series)
- Obsesión (1996) (TV series).... Domingo 'Mingo' Balarezo
- Torbellino (1997) (TV series).... Herman
- Boulevard Torbellino (1997) (TV series)
- Luz María (1998) (TV series).... Christian
- No se lo digas a nadie (1998)... a.k.a. Don't Tell Anyone .... Joaquín Camino
- Isabella (1999) (telenovela)... a.k.a. Isabella: Mujer enamorada....Augusto Calderón
- Pobre diabla (2000) (telenovela).... Christian Mejía Guzmán
- Ciudad de M (2000)... a.k.a. City of M .... M
- Before Night Falls... a.k.a. Antes que anochezca (2000).... Tomás Diego
- I Love You Baby (2001).... Daniel
- Vale todo (2002) (TV series).... Santiago
- Amiga (2003).... Mariano
- Eva del Edén (2004) (TV series)
- Corazón voyeur (2005)
