= María Emilia: Querida =

- Genre: Telenovela
- Created by: Ximena Suárez
- Based on: Emilia by Delia Fiallo
- Written by: Jorge Sarmiento
- Directed by: Eduardo Macías
- Starring: Juan Soler; Coraima Torres
- Theme music composer: Raul Di Blasio
- Opening theme: "Querida" by Juan Gabriel
- Country of origin: Peru
- Original language: Spanish
- No. of seasons: 1
- No. of episodes: 150

Production
- Executive producer: José Enrique Crousillat
- Producer: Malú Crousillat
- Cinematography: Rafael Ruiz
- Editor: Giancarlo Paz
- Production company: Ameríca Producciones

Original release
- Network: América Televisión
- Release: 8 November 1999 – 28 April 2000

María Emilia: Querida is a Peruvian telenovela produced by José Enrique Crousillat for América Producciones. It is an adaptation of the 1979 telenovela titled Emilia, written by Delia Fiallo, and was adapted for television in 1999 by Ximena Suárez. The telenovela is stars by the Venezuelan actress Coraima Torres, and the Mexican actor Juan Soler.

== Plot ==
María Emilia (Coraima Torres) lives with her grandmother and her two brothers. These are very capricious and do not care that María Emilia works every day to support her family. Mónica (Ana Patricia Rojo), her sister is very ambitious and her desire is to leave the humble neighborhood where they live and marry a millionaire. For that reason she tries to make Francisco (Roberto Sen), a rich businessman, fall in love with her. María Emilia gets another job to be able to earn more money as a teacher for Francisco's youngest daughter, there she will meet Alejandro (Juan Soler), also Francisco's son. María Emilia falls in love with Alejandro, and he who has no interest in falling in love only plays with her, but little by little he will begin to feel attraction for her.

== Cast ==
- Juan Soler as Alejandro Aguirre González
- Coraima Torres as María Emilia Pardo-Figueroa Núñez
- Ana Patricia Rojo as Mónica Pardo-Figueroa Núñez
- Ana Bertha Espín as Yolanda González de Aguirre
- Meche Solaeche as Hortencia González de Briceño
- Orlando Fundichely as Eduardo "Lalo" Méndez
- Roberto Sen as Francisco Aguirre
- Roberto Moll as Esteban Briceño
- Silvana Arias as Susana "Susanita" Peña
- Ernesto Cabrejos as Don Prudencio Jara
- Stephanie Cayo as Gabriela "Gaby" Aguirre González
- Giovanni Ciccia as Ricardo Murguía
- Javier Delgiudice as Ernesto Falcón
