= Yo soy Betty, la fea =

1999 Colombian telenovela

- Also known as: Betty, la fea
- Genre: Telenovela; Romantic comedy
- Created by: Fernando Gaitán
- Directed by: Mario Ribero Ferreira
- Starring: Ana María Orozco; Jorge Enrique Abello
- Theme music composer: Francisco Canaro; Ivo Pellay
- Opening theme: "Se dice de mí" by Yolanda Rayo
- Country of origin: Colombia
- Original language: Spanish
- No. of episodes: 335

Production
- Executive producer: María del Pilar Fernández
- Production locations: Bogotá; Cartagena
- Cinematography: Alirio Farfán
- Editor: María Vásquez
- Production company: RCN Televisión

Original release
- Network: RCN
- Release: 25 October 1999 – 8 May 2001

Related
- Ecomoda; Betty Toons; Betty, la fea: la historia continúa; Jassi Jaissi Koi Nahin; La fea más bella; Ugly Betty; I Love Betty La Fea; Bela, a Feia; Betty en NY; Maria i aschimi

Yo soy Betty, la fea (English: I am Betty, the Ugly one), often referred to simply as Betty, la fea, is a Colombian telenovela created by Fernando Gaitán. It aired from 25 October 1999 to 8 May 2001 on RCN. Ana María Orozco stars as the titular character, alongside Jorge Enrique Abello, Natalia Ramírez, Lorna Cepeda, Luis Mesa and Julián Arango.

It is the first telenovela to have been remade worldwide and has been regarded as bringing the telenovela to new levels of success. The story's appeal to global audiences has been credited to it being centered around the life of an unattractive character rather than that of a typical attractive character.

== Plot ==
Taking place mainly in Bogotá, Colombia, Yo soy Betty, la fea is essentially a Cinderella comedy about the rise of poor, ugly 'Betty' Beatriz Pinzón Solano and the fall of rich, handsome Armando Mendoza. Armando is a very incompetent playboy with a scheme to turn a huge profit as the new president of Eco Moda, a famous clothing manufacturing company, alongside the new vice-president Mario Calderon. However, his scheme is doomed for his faulty mathematics. Betty, his secretary (and economics wizard), is in love with him despite his engagement to Marcela Valencia. She helps Armando deceive the board of directors as he loses money and brings the company to ruin. The story has three movements: 1) Armando's foolish destruction of Eco Moda, 2) Betty's flight from the disgrace and her temporary new job in Cartagena where she undergoes an emotional and physical transformation, and 3) Betty's return to Eco Moda, where she is installed as new CEO.

== Cast ==
=== Main ===
- Ana María Orozco as Beatriz "Betty" Aurora Pinzón Solano; A rather uncouth woman but very skilled in economics with a good CV. Later becomes a CEO assistant and economist. She is the pride of her parents. She is in love with Armando Mendoza.
- Jorge Enrique Abello as Armando Mendoza Sáenz; Eco Moda's CEO. A somewhat irresponsible playboy with only basic knowledge in industrial engineering who presents a risky and ambitious proposal with which he wins the presidency of Eco Moda. When he manages it, it brings the company to the brink of bankruptcy, thus Betty steps in to help. Despite being a completely superficial playboy, he sincerely falls in love with Betty, seeing beyond her ugliness.
- Natalia Ramírez as Marcela Valencia; Armando's fiancée and Eco Moda's stockholder and retail manager. Despite her dislike of Betty, she is not actually a bad person, but a woman full of pride, classism and lacks dignity, and she loves Armando. She later willingly gives up on him as she discovers he actually loves Betty.
- Lorna Cepeda as Patricia Fernández; Marcela's best friend and secretary. A divorced woman, refined and superficial, as well as materialist, she is looking for a rich husband. Armando hates her because she is a dumb blonde and knows that Marcela wants her as Armando's secretary to watch over his infidelities.
- Luis Mesa as Daniel Felipe Valencia; Marcela's brother. Male chauvinist and arrogant, shareholder of Eco Moda. He rivals and dislikes Armando and unlike him, he is realistic and the only one worried about his company. He has an affair with Patricia.
- Julián Arango as Hugo Lombardi; Eco Moda's fashion designer. Openly gay and arrogant, who despises ugliness. He dislikes almost everyone at Eco Moda and especially hates Eco Moda's secretaries, whom he nicknames 'The Ugly Cuartel', with the exception of Inesita who is perhaps the only person he actually cares for. Arango was married to Ana María Orozco during the recording.
- Ricardo Vélez as Mario Calderón; Armando's best friend and Eco Moda's commercial vice president. A staunch playboy, inveterate enemy of commitments and fatherhood, he is strangely enough a rather neutral figure.
- Mario Duarte as Nicolás Flaminio Mora Cifuentes; Betty's best friend and economist. Like Betty, he is unattractive and highly intelligent. He is in love with Patricia and boasts of his position as president of Terramoda. Patricia softens to him but only because of his newfound wealth.
- Kepa Amuchastegui as Roberto Mendoza; Armando's father, founder of the company. Kind hearted and intelligent.
- Talú Quintero as Margarita Sáenz de Mendoza; Armando's mother.
- Adriana Franco as Julia Solano Galindo de Pinzón; Betty's mother. Loves her daughter dearly.
- Jorge Herrera as Hermes Pinzón Galarza; Betty's father and accountant.
- Pilar Uribe as María Beatriz Valencia; Marcela's and Daniel's sister. Carefree woman who loves opulence.
- Julio César Herrera as Freddy Stewart Contreras; messenger, infatuated with Aura Maria and also in love of Jenny. Flamboyant but not gay, he is a very happy man.
- Dora Cadavid as Inés "Inesita" Ramírez de Muriel; seamstress, member of the cuartel. Kind and wise, she is the elderly assistant to Hugo Lombardi who loves her like a mother. She is the voice of reason and is as sane as Betty in the cuartel.
- Estefanía Gómez as Aura María Fuentes Rico; receptionist, member of the cuartel. Single mother looking for a husband and stepfather for her son. Beautiful and voluptuous, she is usually promiscuous but with a big heart.
- Paula Peña as Sofía López de Rodríguez; secretary, member of the cuartel. Divorced woman who constantly fights with her ex-husband Efraín over their children's pension. She has a feud with Jenny, the current romantic partner of her ex-husband. Formerly Gustavo Olarte's secretary and after his dismissal, she temporarily becomes Betty's secretary.
- Luces Velásquez as Bertha Muñoz de González; Gutiérrez' secretary, somewhat gluttonous, member of the cuartel. She is married with children and deeply loves her husband. She occasionally imitates Patricia's way of dressing.
- Marcela Posada as Sandra Patiño; Calderón's secretary, member of the cuartel. Known for her height. She is usually aggressive with whoever is the enemy of the cuartel.
- María Eugenía Arboleda as Mariana Valdés; Marcela's secretary, member of the cuartel. Known for reading tarot, she is very optimistic and a lover of rumba.
- Celmira Luzardo as Catalina Ángel; Betty's "fairy godmother" and public relationist. A dignified, loquacious, eloquent and recognized woman.
- Alberto León Jaramillo as Saúl Gutiérrez; Eco Moda's Director of Human Resources. Pedantic and smug man who also despises ugliness and is known for his "Spanglish". He usually sides with whoever is in charge.
- Marta Isabel Bolaños as Jenny García; Efraín's younger girlfriend. Attractive but quite dimwitted and materialistic, she rivals Sofía for Efraín's money. She calls Efraín "pupuchurro".
- David Ramírez as Wilson Sastoque Mejía; Eco Moda's security guard and friend to Betty and her friends.
- Raúl Santa as Efraín Rodríguez Merchán "El Cheque"; Sofia's ex-husband and Jenny's boyfriend.
- Patrick Delmas as Michel Doinel; Betty's handsome friend and suitor. He is in love with Betty, to whom he offers a stable relationship without caring that she is virtually ugly.
- Diego Cadavid as Román; a street rat.

=== Recurring ===
- Alberto Valdiri as "Gordito" González, Bertha's husband.
- Angeline Moncayo as Karina Larson. Formerly a model and Armando's ex-mistress.
- Carlos Serrato as Gustavo Olarte, Eco Moda's ex-financial vice president. Daniel's right hand.
- César Mora as Antonio Sánchez, Betty's lawyer.
- Claudia Becerra as Mónica Agudelo.
- Diego Vivanco as Rolando "el Chesito su mercé", Hugo's boyfriend.
- Germán Tóvar as José Ambrosio Rosales; lawyer, Antonio's colleague.
- Hugo Perez as Rafael Muriel, Inesita's ex-husband.
- Iván Piñeros as Jimmy Fuentes (Aura María's son).
- Lorena McAllister as Diana Medina.
- Luis Enrique Roldán as Juan Manuel Santamaría, penalist Eco Moda's lawyer.
- Miguel Ángel Báes as a 2nd systems engineer.
- Paulo Sánchez Neira as Miguel Ortíz, Eco Moda's ex-systems engineer at the service of Olarte.
- Rubén Óliver as Miguel Robles, corrupt president of Rag Tela.
- Sebastián Sánchez as Miguel. (2001)
- Scarlet Ortiz as Alejandra Zingg.
- Yesenia Valencia as Susi.
- Verónica Ocampo as Claudia Bosch, an attractive model obsessed with Armando since both had an affair.
- Vilma Vera as Maruja Bravo de Gutiérrez, Saul Gutiérrez's wife.

== Sequels and spin-offs ==
=== Ecomoda ===
The success of Yo soy Betty, la fea led to its first sequel titled Ecomoda. It premiered first on Univision on 2 December 2001, concluding on 2 June 2002. Some scenes from the first episode were filmed in Buenos Aires, and some scenes for the opening sequence were filmed in Miami, Florida. In Colombia, the series premiered on 21 May 2002.

=== Betty Toons ===
Betty Toons is an animated television series that features Betty as a child with her friends. It aired on RCN Televisión between 2002 and 2003. In the U.S., Betty Toons previously aired Saturday mornings on most affiliates of Telefutura (now UniMás), as part of the Toonturama block from 2006 to 2008.

=== Betty, la fea: la historia continúa ===
In July 2023, it was announced that Amazon Prime Video had ordered a second sequel series. The series, titled Betty, la fea: la historia continúa premiered on 19 July 2024.

== International remakes ==
Country	Language	Name	Network	Protagonist	Date premiered	Date ended
Algeria	Algerian Arabic	طيموشة (Timoucha)	ENTV	Mina Lachter	24 April 2020	9 May 2021
Belgium	Dutch	Sara	vtm	Veerle Baetens	25 September 2007	29 June 2008
Brazil	Portuguese	Bela, a Feia	Rede Record	Giselle Itié	4 August 2009	2 June 2010
China	Mandarin Chinese	丑女无敌 / 醜女無敵(Chǒunǚ wúdí)	Hunan Satellite TV	Li Xinru	September 2008	
Czech Republic	Czech	Ošklivka Katka	TV Prima	Kateřina Janečková	3 March 2008	20 April 2009
Ecuador	Spanish	Veto al Feo	Ecuavisa	Efraín Ruales	16 April 2013	26 April 2013
Egypt	Arabic	هبة رجل الغراب (Heba Regl El-Ghorab)	OSN, CBC2, MBC 1	Amy Samir Ghanem	1 January 2014	15 April 2021
Georgia	Georgian	გოგონა გარეუბნიდან (Gogona Gareubnidan)	Imedi TV	Tina Makharadze	24 May 2010	21 October 2012
Germany	German	Verliebt in Berlin	Sat.1	Alexandra Neldel	28 February 2005	12 October 2007
Greece	Greek	Μαρία, ἡ Ἄσχημη (Maria i aschimi)	Mega Channel	Aggeliki Daliani	1 January 2007	23 June 2008
India	Hindi	जस्सी जैसी कोई नहीं (Jassi Jaissi Koi Nahin)	SET India	Mona Singh	1 September 2003	4 May 2006
Israel	Hebrew	אסתי המכוערת (Esti HaMekho'eret)	Channel 2	Riki Blich	2003	2006
Malaysia	Malay	Misi Betty	TV9	Siti Fazurina	2011	
Mexico	Spanish	La fea más bella	Televisa	Angélica Vale	2006	2007
Mexico	Spanish	El amor no es como lo pintan*	TV Azteca	Vanessa Acosta	2000	2001
Netherlands	Dutch	Lotte	Talpa	Nyncke Beekhuyzen	2006	9 April 2007
Philippines	Filipino	i ♥ Betty La Fea	ABS-CBN	Bea Alonzo	8 September 2008	24 April 2009
Poland	Polish	BrzydUla	TVN	Julia Kamińska	October 2008	December 2009
Portugal	Portuguese	Tudo por amor**	TVI	Sofia Duarte Silva	22 April 2002	19 June 2003
Russia	Russian	Не родись красивой / Ne Rodis Krasivoy	STS	Nelli Uvarova	5 September 2005	7 July 2006
Serbia	Croatian and Serbian	Ne daj se, Nina	FOX Televizija	Lana Gojak	29 October 2007	3 March 2008
Croatia	Croatian and Serbian	Ne daj se, Nina	RTL Televizija	Lana Gojak	3 January 2008	4 August 2008
South Africa	English	uBettina Wethu	SABC1	Farieda Metsileng	2021	-
Spain	Spanish	Yo soy Bea	Telecinco	Ruth Núñez	2006	2008
Thailand	Thai	ยัยเป็ดขี้เหร่ Ugly Betty Thailand	ThairathTV	Piyarat Kaljaruek	9 March 2015	7 September 2015
Turkey	Turkish	Sensiz Olmuyor	Show TV, Kanal D	Özlem Conker, Yeliz Şar	2005	
Ukraine	Ukrainian	Моя улюблена Страшко (Moja uljublena Straško)	1+1	Iryna Poplavska	30 August 2021	TBA
United States	English	Ugly Betty	ABC	America Ferrera	28 September 2006	14 April 2010
United States	Spanish	Betty en NY	Telemundo	Elyfer Torres	6 February 2019	12 August 2019
Vietnam	Vietnamese	Cô Gái Xấu Xí	VTV3	Nguyễn Ngọc Hiệp	11 February 2008	31 March 2009

*The Mexican Telenovela "El amor no es como lo pintan" was accused of being a plagiarism of the "Yo soy Betty, la fea".
**Remake of "El amor no es como lo pintan".

== See also ==
- List of Colombian TV Shows
- Cinema of Colombia
- Culture of Colombia
- Television in Colombia
- List of television show franchises
