= Amas de casa desesperadas (2007 TV series) =

- Starring: Ana Maria Orozco; Geraldine Zivic; Ruddy Rodríguez; Marisol Romero; Lorena Meritano
- Narrated by: Sofía Vergara
- Countries of origin: Colombia; Ecuador

Production
- Running time: 50 minutes
- Production company: Buena Vista International Television Latin America

Original release
- Network: RCN; Teleamazonas

Amas de Casa Desesperadas (Colombian-Ecuadorian version) is one of the Latin-tailored versions of Desperate Housewives, the Emmy and Golden Globe award-winning American television comedy-drama series created by Marc Cherry. It debuted on 21 May 2007 on Teleamazonas and on 1 October 2007 on RCN TV.

== Basic settings ==
The show takes place on the fictional street of Manzanares. It follows the lives of four women, seen through the eyes of their dead neighbor - as they work through domestic struggles while several mysteries unfold in the background.

== Cast ==
- Ana Maria Orozco as Susana Martinez
- Ruddy Rodríguez as Eugenia de Koppel (Season 1)
- Geraldine Zivic as Lina Yepes (Season 1)
- Sofía Vergara as Alicia Oviedo
- Lorena Meritano as Veronica Villa
- Marisol Romero as Gabriela Solis
- Carolina Gómez as Eugenia de Koppel (Season 2)
- Flora Martínez as Lina Yepes (Season 2)
- Diego Trujillo as Armando Koppel (who dies in Season 1)
- Diego Ramos as Miguel Delfino
- Víctor Mallarino as PabloOviedo
- Valeria Santa as Daniela Koppel
- Cristian Quezab as Andrés Koppel
- Valentina Acosta as Lucía Quiñónez
- Juan Manuel Gallego as Julián Oviedo
- Helena Mallarino as Felicidad Ruíz
- María Angélica Mallarino as Marta Ruíz
- Diana Guerrero Vélez as Domenica Koppet
- Julián Arango as Tomás Aguilar
- Rodrigo Guirao Díaz as Juan el Jardinero
- Juan Carlos Salazar as Carlos Solís
- Estefany Escobar as Alejandra Perreta
- Mario Moscoso as Leonardo Herrera
- María Cecilia Botero as Irene Peláez
- Tatiana Rentería as Luisa Quiñónez
- Jairo Camargo as Cristóbal Quiñónez

== Writers and directors ==
- Production: Buena Vista International Television Latin America
- Production Companies: Pol-ka Productions (Argentina) and Vista Productions (Colombia)
- Countries: Colombia, Ecuador
- Colombian Executive Producers: Jaime Sánchez Cristo and Sofía Vergara
- Ecuadorean Executive Producers: Sebastián Corral and Claudia Cárdenas
- Direction: Sebastian Pivotto, Martin Desalvo
- General Direction: Víctor Mallarino
- Executive Production: Diego Andrasnik
- Executive Production Buena Vista International Television: Leonardo Aranguibel and Fernando Barbosa
