= Sangre de Lobos =

- Genre: Telenovela
- Directed by: Víctor Mallarino
- Starring: Aura Christina Geithner; Edmundo Troya
- Country of origin: Colombia
- Original language: Spanish

Original release
- Network: Canal A (Producciones JES)
- Release: 1992

Sangre de Lobos ("Blood of Wolves") was a successful Colombian telenovela produced in 1992 by Producciones JES and aired on Canal A. It was written by Mónica Agudelo and Bernardo Romero Pereiro.

It spawned a Mexican remake in 1998, Tentaciones ("Temptations") produced by TV Azteca. It had to be removed from the air in that country.
