= 2021 Kids' Choice Awards Mexico =

Mexican entertainment awards ceremony

Kids' Choice Awards Mexico 2021
- Date: September 7, 2021
- Location: Mexico City
- Country: Mexico
- Hosted by: Ex de Lesslie Polinesia, hermano del Ex de Lesslie Polinesia, Fede Vigevani
- Most awards: BTS (3)
- Most nominations: SKabeche (5)
- Website: www.kcamexico.com

Television/radio coverage
- Network: Nickelodeon

The 2021 Kids' Choice Awards Mexico took place on September 7, 2021, via Nickelodeon. The awards recognizes the greatest acts of Mexican pop culture, various artists from music, TV and Cinema. As in the previous year the awards were held virtually and were hosted by the internet personalities Ex de Lesslie polynesia, Hermano del ex de Lesslie Polinesia and Fede Vigevani. The ceremony, in addition to being broadcast on the channel, was broadcast live on YouTube and Facebook.

== Performances ==
The performers were announced via the official KCA Mexico website.

Performers at the Kids' Choice Awards Mexico 2021
Performer(s)	Song(s)
Karol Sevilla	"Nadie Te Entiende"
Matisse	"De Pies a Cabeza"
Sofia Reyes	"Casualidad"
Piso 21	"Tan Bonita"

== Winners and nominees ==
Voting to choose the nominees began on June 28 and ended on July 26. As of the mentioned date, the voting to choose the winners began and ended on August 22.

Indicates the winner within each category.

Favorite Squad	Inspiration
SKuad SKabeche; Privé Crew; Aventureros; Fede Vigevani y la Vecibanda	Sol Carlos; Bala; Josué Benjamin; Pau Zurita
Favorite Actor	Favorite Actress
Emilio Osorio – ¿Qué le pasa a mi familia?; Ricardo Frascari – Club 57; Sebastián Silva – Club 57; Julio Peña – Bia: Un mundo al revés	Macarena García – 100 días para enamorarnos; Paulina Matos – ¿Qué le pasa a mi familia?; Evaluna Montaner – Club 57; Isi Vives – Si nos dejan
Favorite Show	Favorite Nick Show
¿Qué le pasa a mi familia?; Club 57; Madre sólo hay dos; Bia: Un mundo al revés	Club 57; Bob Esponja; The Loud House; Los Casagrande
Favorite Cartoon	Top Latin Artist
Bob Esponja; The Loud House; Los Vecinos Green; La Casa Búho	CNCO; Danna Paola; Camilo; Morat
New Artist	Global Hit
Humbe; Susana Cala; Ramón Vega; Nicole Gatti	"Butter" – BTS; "Baila Conmigo" – Selena Gomez & Rauw Alejandro; "Good 4 U" – Olivia Rodrigo; "Golden" – Harry Styles
Catchier Song	K-Pop Bomb
"Pareja del Año" – Sebastián Yatra & Myke Towers; "Calla Tú" – Danna Paola; "Todo de Ti" – Rauw Alejandro; "Ropa Cara" – Camilo	BTS; Rosé; Blackpink; TXT
Top Creator	Creator #ForYou
Karol Sevilla; Lesslie Polinesia; Kenia Os; Piculincito	Domelipa; Fefi Olivera; Jerry Castler; Darian Rojas
New Idol	Gamer MVP
César Pantoja; Gael Gamboa; Jimena Jiménez; Francisca Aronsson	AuronPlay; Eddy SKabeche; TheDonato; RaptorGamer
Coolest YouTuber	Viral of the Year
Fede Vigevani; Yolo Aventuras; SKabeche; Missa Sinfonia	Khaby Lame – El chico anti lifehacks; Baby Yoda; Among Us; Bárbara de Regil – Sonríe
InstaPets	Fashion Icon
SK Pets de SKabeche; Pets de Polinesios; Pets de los Rulés; Octavio de Kenia y Eloisa Os	Joaquín Bondoni; Darian Rojas; Eloisa Os; Joel Pimentel
Master Fandom	Ship of the Year
Army (BTS); Aventureros (Yolo Aventuras); Polinesios (Los Polinesios); CNCOwners (CNCO)	Yoloriana; Darian Rojas & Jashlem; Eddy SKabeche & Xio; Calle & Poché
Pro Social Award
Jorge Rickards
