= La Bala =

La Bala may refer to:

- La Bala (album), an album by Ana Tijoux
- La Bala (YouTuber), a Mexican YouTuber
- "La Bala", a track on the 2010 album Entren Los Que Quieran by Calle 13
