= List of Club 57 episodes =

Club 57 is a television series developed by Rainbow SpA and Nickelodeon in collaboration with RAI. It was created by Catharina Ledoboer and produced by Iginio Straffi and Pierluigi Gazzolo. The show follows a student from the 21st century named Eva (Evaluna Montaner) who accidentally travels to the year 1957, where she falls in love with an Italian greaser named JJ (Riccardo Frascari).

An unaired pilot episode for the series was filmed at Viacom's Miami studio in 2016. The first season consists of sixty 45-minute episodes, which were filmed in both the Apulia region of Italy and Miami. It made its world premiere on Rai Gulp in Italy on 15 April 2019. Rai Gulp divided the season into four 15-episode waves. In Latin America, the season premiered on Nickelodeon on 6 May 2019; all sixty episodes were aired daily over two months.

In October 2019, Rainbow SpA's Andrea Graciotti stated that a second season was in development. The second season premiered on Nickelodeon Latin America with its first 30 episodes between 14 June and 23 July 2021. The next 30 episodes premiered between 13 September and 22 October 2021.

== Overview ==
Wave	Episodes	Originally released (Italy)	
Wave	Episodes	First released	Last released
1	15	15 April 2019	3 May 2019
2	15	30 September 2019	16 October 2019
3	15	10 December 2019	26 December 2019
4	15	15 May 2020	4 June 2020

== Episodes ==
=== Wave 1 ===
No. overall	No. in season	Italian title / Spanish title Title translated to English	Italian air date	Latin American air date
1	1	"Un salto nel tempo" / "Un salto en el tiempo" "A Jump in Time"	15 April 2019	6 May 2019
2	2	"In fuga dal passato" / "Huyendo del pasado" "Fleeing from the Past"	16 April 2019	7 May 2019
3	3	"Un piano geniale" / "Un plan genial" "A Great Plan"	17 April 2019	8 May 2019
4	4	"Non sono tuo nonno!" / "¡No soy tu abuelo!" "I'm Not Your Grandfather!"	18 April 2019	9 May 2019
5	5	"Un ingaggio da star" / "Un contrato de estrella" "A Star Contract"	19 April 2019	10 May 2019
6	6	"L'effetto farfalla" / "El efecto mariposa" "The Butterfly Effect"	22 April 2019	13 May 2019
7	7	"Una missione per l'apprendista guardiano" / "Una misión para el guardián novato" "A Mission for the Apprentice Guardian"	23 April 2019	14 May 2019
8	8	"La centrale del tempo" / "La central del tiempo" "The Time Center"	24 April 2019	15 May 2019
9	9	"Il Bolorama A-Go-Go" / "El Bolorama A-Go-Go" "The Bowl-o-Rama A-Go-Go"	25 April 2019	16 May 2019
10	10	"A caccia di Galileo" / "Buscando a Galileo" "Hunting for Galileo"	26 April 2019	17 May 2019
11	11	"I talenti del Cristobal Colon" / "Cristóbal Colón tiene talento" "Cristóbal Colón's Got Talent"	29 April 2019	20 May 2019
12	12	"Ritorno in Italia" / "De vuelta a Italia" "Return to Italy"	30 April 2019	21 May 2019
13	13	"Quando il sogno è realtà" / "Cuando el sueño se hace realidad" "When a Dream Comes True"	1 May 2019	22 May 2019
14	14	"Ti regalo la luna" / "Te regalo la luna" "I Gift You the Moon"	2 May 2019	23 May 2019
15	15	"Addio 1957!" / "¡Adiós 1957!" "Goodbye, 1957!"	3 May 2019	24 May 2019

=== Wave 2 ===
No. overall	No. in season	Italian title / Spanish title Title translated to English	Italian air date	Latin American air date
16	1	"Ritorno al presente" / "Volver al presente" "Return to the Present"	30 September 2019	27 May 2019
17	2	"L'ammutinamento" / "El motín del tiempo" "Time Mutiny"	1 October 2019	28 May 2019
18	3	"Un nonno sconosciuto" / "Un abuelo desconocido" "Grandfather Unknown"	2 October 2019	29 May 2019
19	4	"Galeotto fu il fumetto" / "Todo cambio por el cómic" "The Comic Changes Everything"	3 October 2019	30 May 2019
20	5	"L'esibizione rubata" / "La presentación usurpada" "Stolen Show"	4 October 2019	31 May 2019
21	6	"Oltre i limiti del tempo" / "Más allá de los límites temporales" "Beyond the Limits of Time"	5 October 2019	3 June 2019
22	7	"La scoperta di Ruben" / "El descubrimiento de Rubén" "Ruben's Discovery"	7 October 2019	4 June 2019
23	8	"Parole che lasciano il segno" / "Palabras que dejan huella" "Words That Leave Their Mark"	8 October 2019	5 June 2019
24	9	"Lo scrapbook" / "La escrapola" "The Scrapbook"	9 October 2019	6 June 2019
25	10	"Amiche da sempre" / "Amigas...desde siempre" "Friends Since Forever"	10 October 2019	7 June 2019
26	11	"Mai fidarsi troppo..." / "Nunca confíes demasiado..." "Never Trust Too Much..."	11 October 2019	10 June 2019
27	12	"Un'incredibile rivelazione" / "Una revelación increíble" "An Incredible Revelation"	12 October 2019	11 June 2019
28	13	"Il cubo cancella-memoria" / "El cubo borra-memoria" "The Memory-Erasing Cube"	14 October 2019	12 June 2019
29	14	"Il tribunale del tempo" / "El tribunal del tiempo" "The Tribunal of Time"	15 October 2019	13 June 2019
30	15	"Il segreto di Eva" / "El secreto de Eva" "Eva's Secret"	16 October 2019	14 June 2019

=== Wave 3 ===
No. overall	No. in season	Italian title / Spanish title Title translated to English	Italian air date	Latin American air date
31	1	"I guardiani smarriti" / "Un aliado misterioso" "The Lost Guardians / A Mysterious Ally"	10 December 2019	17 June 2019
32	2	"Il protocollo scoiattolo" / "El protocolo ardilla" "The Squirrel Protocol"	11 December 2019	18 June 2019
33	3	"La vendetta di Barbanera" / "La venganza de Barbanegra" "Blackbeard's Revenge"	12 December 2019	19 June 2019
34	4	"Tra testa e cuore" / "Entre la razón y el corazón" "Between the Head and the Heart"	13 December 2019	20 June 2019
35	5	"Il reset temporale" / "El reseteo del tiempo" "Time Reset"	14 December 2019	21 June 2019
36	6	"Fratelli ritrovati" / "El reencuentro de los hermanos" "Sibling Reunion"	16 December 2019	24 June 2019
37	7	"Un patto scorretto" / "Un pacto injusto" "An Unfair Pact"	17 December 2019	25 June 2019
38	8	"Tutti all'opera!" / "¡Manos a la obra!" "Let's Get It Done!"	18 December 2019	26 June 2019
39	9	"La cyberlibellula" / "La cyberlibélula" "The Cyber-Dragonfly"	19 December 2019	27 June 2019
40	10	"Una promessa infranta" / "Una promesa rota" "A Broken Promise"	20 December 2019	28 June 2019
41	11	"Aspettami, Ruru!" / "¡Espérame, Rurú!" "Wait for Me, Ruru!"	21 December 2019	1 July 2019
42	12	"L'arrivo di Sofia" / "La llegada de Sofía" "The Arrival of Sofia"	23 December 2019	2 July 2019
43	13	"Il numero multidimensionale" / "El número multidimensional" "The Multidimensional Number"	24 December 2019	3 July 2019
44	14	"Che il concorso abbia inizio!" / "¡Qué empiece el concurso!" "Let the Contest Begin!"	25 December 2019	4 July 2019
45	15	"Il loop temporale" / "El bucle del tiempo" "The Time Loop"	26 December 2019	5 July 2019

=== Wave 4 ===
No. overall	No. in season	Italian title / Spanish title Title translated to English	Italian air date	Latin American air date
46	1	"Stop al tempo!" / "Congelados en el tiempo" "Frozen in Time"	15 May 2020	8 July 2019
47	2	"Il disgelo" / "El deshielo" "The Thawing"	18 May 2020	9 July 2019
48	3	"L'unità multidimensionale" / "El escuadrón multidimensional" "The Multidimensional Group"	19 May 2020	10 July 2019
49	4	"La sfida di ballo" / "El duelo de baile" "The Dance Contest"	20 May 2020	11 July 2019
50	5	"Un unicorno per amico" / "Mi amigo unicornio" "A Unicorn for a Friend"	21 May 2020	12 July 2019
51	6	"JJ, è la tua occasione!" / "¡JJ, es tu oportunidad!" "JJ, It's Your Chance!"	22 May 2020	15 July 2019
52	7	"Il blackout" / "El apagón" "The Blackout"	25 May 2020	16 July 2019
53	8	"Salviamo la nonna!" / "¡Rescatemos a la abuela!" "Let's Save Grandma!"	26 May 2020	17 July 2019
54	9	"Il tradimento di Sofia" / "Sofía la traidora" "Sofia's Betrayal"	27 May 2020	18 July 2019
55	10	"Il ritorno di Amelia" / "Amelia regresó" "The Return of Amelia"	28 May 2020	19 July 2019
56	11	"Troppo tardi per le scuse" / "Muy tarde para las excusas" "Too Late for Excuses"	29 May 2020	22 July 2019
57	12	"Dov'è finita Eva?" / "¿Qué pasó con Eva?" "Where Did Eva Go?"	1 June 2020	23 July 2019
58	13	"A carte scoperte" / "La verdad sale a la luz" "The Truth Comes to Light"	2 June 2020	24 July 2019
59	14	"Vero, ti presento Vero" / "Vero, te presento a Vero" "Vero, Meet Vero"	3 June 2020	25 July 2019
60	15	"Una scelta difficile" / "Una dura decisión" "A Difficult Decision"	4 June 2020	26 July 2019
