= Martín Barba =

Mexican actor and singer

- Born: Martín González Barba; December 2, 1989 (age 36); Oaxaca, Oaxaca, Mexico
- Occupation: Actor
- Years active: 2008–present

Martín González Barba (born December 2, 1989) is a Mexican actor and singer, known for his character Benjamín Casanegra in the series Último año.

== Career ==
Barba is a graduate of acting academy "CEA" of Televisa. He has participated in several Televisa productions. In 2013 he joined Telemundo, to participate in two soap operas.

== Filmography ==
=== Films ===
Year	Title	Role	Notes
2014	Los Ocho	Marcos	Film debut
2014	Cuatro lunas	Pepe	
2014	Lo que sí salía bien	Himself	Video short

=== Television ===
Year	Title	Role	Notes
2008	Las tontas no van al cielo		Minor role
2009	Verano de amor	Jordi	Episode: "Los anillos"
2009	Sortilegio		Minor role
2010	La rosa de Guadalupe		"Miss Narco" (Season 3, Episode 68)
2011	Como dice el dicho		"El lobo pierde el pelo" (Season 1, Episode 10)
2011	Una familia con suerte		Recurring role
2012	Último año	Benjamín Casanegra	Lead role
2013	La Patrona	David Beltrán Suárez	Recurring role
2014	En otra piel	Ricardo Cantú	Recurring role
2014–2015	Señora Acero	Joaquín	Recurring role; 18 episodes
2015–2016	Yo quisiera	Pablo	Lead role
2015–2016	Yo soy Franky	Christian Montero	Lead role
2017	Las Malcriadas	Eduardo Espinosa	Recurring role
2019–2021	Club 57	Aurek	Lead Role
2022	Supertitlán	Byron	Lead Role
2025	Breakdown	Leonardo Gutiérrez	Main role
