= Carolina Mestrovic =

Chilean singer, actress and TV hostess

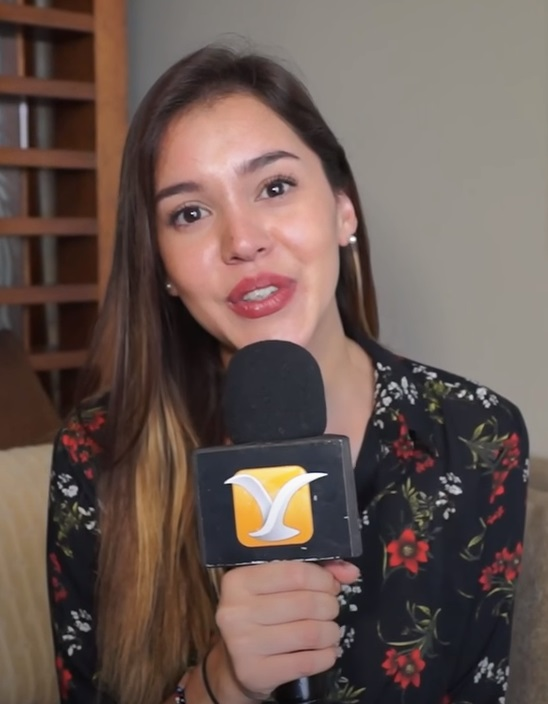
- Born: Carolina Verónica Mestrovic Moroni; July 20, 1991 (age 34); Arica, Chile
- Occupations: Actress, singer, television presenter
- Years active: 2003–present
- Spouse: Jonathan Freudman
- Partner: Mario Velasco
- Children: Julieta Velasco Mestrovic

Carolina Veronica Mestrovic Moroni (born July 20, 1991) is a Chilean singer, actress and TV host known for her role in TVN's Rojo fame contrafama, where she won the "singers category" in 2008.

== Career ==
Mestrovic first appeared on television in 2008 in the Chilean program Rojo fama contrafama (Red, the Value of Talent), where she won in the Singers category and received a car as her reward. She subsequently joined Chilevisión's youth program Yingo, which also showcased her singing talent. In 2010 she competed on Yingo and won second place, collecting a CL$1,000,000 prize. In December 2010 she participated in Yingo′s "great challenge" as a couple with Jaime Artus, but dropped out on December 22. Mestrovic was part of the second musical album of this program, called Yingo 2, and debuted as an actor with the miniseries Amor Virtual and Don diablo. She participated in the casting for the Latin American version of High School Musical.

On November 25, 2011, Mestrovic left Yingo to join the rival show Una nueva competencia por un Auto (A New Competition for a Car). She also played Linda in the miniseries Gordis and participated in the fifth season of Fiebre de Baile: Famosos en peligro (Dance Fever: Celebrities in Danger). She also went on to lead the backstage of El Rey del Show (King of the Show).

She then left to join the drama channel area to play Sofia in Telefe's TV series Graduotos, which became the most successful television series of 2012 in Argentina.

In addition, she was chosen to handle the backstage of the Viña Festival.

=== Music ===
In 2003, Mestrovic was in a band called "duoYndigo" with Fernando Alvarez and Federico Henriquez.

In 2009, she was part of the second Yingo soundtrack, called Yingo 2. She sang three songs, one a duet with Karen Paola.

== Personal life ==
Mestrovic's mother, Veronica Moroni, is Argentinian, and her father, Stanislav Mestrovic, is a Chilean-Croatian national. Mestrovic was born in Arica, Chile but spent her childhood and part of her youth in Mendoza, Argentina. In December 2010 she confirmed that she was pregnant by Mario Velasco, former host of Yingo; their daughter Juliet Velasco was born on July 13, 2011.

== Filmography ==
=== Television ===
==== TV shows ====
Year	Program	Result	Channel
2008	Rojo fama contrafama	Won	TVN
2008	Yingo Competencia por un departamento	2nd place	Chilevisión
2010	El gran desafío de Yingo	Dropped out	Chilevisión
2010	Una nueva competencia	Possibly won	Chilevisión
2011	Una nueva competencia (2nd season)	Lost	Chilevisión
2011	Una nueva competencia (3rd season)	Unknown	Chilevisión
2012	Fiebre de baile	Semi-finalist	Chilevisión

==== Host ====
Year	Title	Channel
2012	Yingo	
2012	El Rey del Show	
2013	54º Festival de Viña del Mar (backstage)	
2014	Sin Vergüenza	

=== Dramas ===
Year	Title	Characters	Channel
2010	Amor Virtual	Trinidad Ferreira	Chilevisión
2010	Don diablo	Malena Malebrán	Chilevisión
2012	Gordis	Linda Sepulveda	Chilevisión
2013	Graduados	Sofia Matic	Chilevisión
2019	Club 57	Vero	Nickelodeon

== Discography ==
Songs

- "No me hagas esperar"
- "Juntitos»
- "Así es el amor" (with Karen Paola) (Yingo 2)
- "Vivo en rebeldía" (Yingo 2)
- "Quiero saber" (Yingo 2)
- "Mentiras y egos"
- "No puedo olvidarte"

== Awards and nominations ==
Year	Award	Category	Production	Outcome
2010	TV Grama	Favorite Actress Youth	Don diablo	Winner
2012	GoldTie	Best Youth Performance	Gordis	Nominated
2012	GoldTie	Best Youth Camp TV	Yingo	Nominated
2012	TV Grama	Favorite Actress Youth	Gordis	Winner
2012	TV Grama	Best Entertainer / a Youth	Yingo	Nominated
