= Sebastián Silva (entertainer) =

Colombian actor and singer

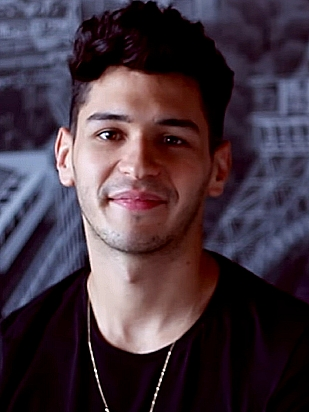
- Born: Juan Sebastián Silva Martínez
- Education: National University of Colombia
- Occupation: Actor
- Years active: 2011–present

Juan Sebastián Silva Martínez, commonly known as Sebastián Silva, is a Colombian internet personality, vlogger, actor, presenter and singer. He is best known for playing the roles of Pite in The Queen of Flow (2018), and Rubén in Club 57 (2019). He studied cinema and television at the National University of Colombia.

== Filmography ==
Television roles
Year	Title	Role	Notes
2016	Celia	Alberto	Recurring role; 2 episodes
2018–2021	The Queen of Flow	Pite	Main role (season 1–2)
2019–2021	Club 57	Rubén	Main role (season 1–2)

== Awards and nominations ==
Year	Award	Category	Work	Result	Ref.
2018	India Catalina Awards	Best Online Revelation Talent	True3D	Nominated	
2019	Kids Choice Awards Mexico	Favorite Actor	Club 57	Nominated	
