= La Bala (YouTuber) =

Mexican YouTuber, singer and actress

Bala (Isabela de la Torre)
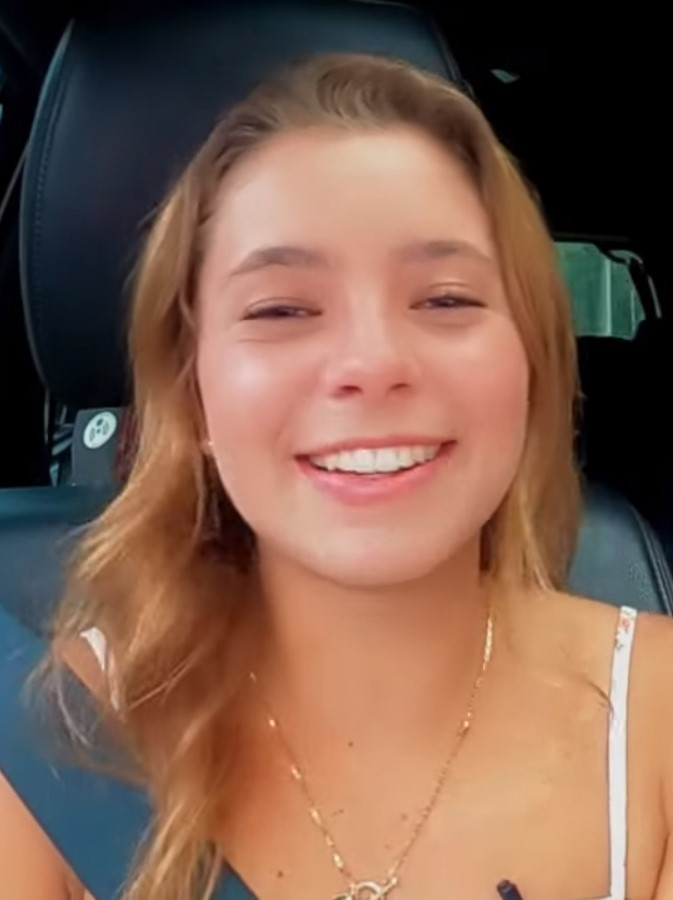
- La Bala in 2021
- Born: Isabella de la Torre; 19 July 2004 (age 22); Albuquerque, New Mexico, USA
- Occupation: YouTuber

YouTube information
- Channel: La Bala
- Years active: 2015–present
- Genres: Singer; Let's play
- Subscribers: 6.9 million
- Views: 1.01 billion
- Last updated: 2 September 2024

Isabella de La Torre Echenique (Mexico City; 19 July 2004) better known as "Bala" is a Mexican-American singer. With sed in Albuquerque, New Mexico, USA. She started as a YouTuber when she was 11 years old, when she had the idea to shoot a video and her parents gave her support. On her channel, she mainly did sketches and parodies, although in the following years she began to do vlogs, musical parodies, challenges, jesting, etc. In 2019 she was chosen as a Nickelodeon ambassador in Latin America, and appeared in the Club 57 series. She has collaborated with other YouTubers such as Luisito Comunica, Berth Oh!, La Diversión de Martina among others. and amassed over four million subscribers on YouTube.

== Biography ==
De la Torre was born in Mexico City, Mexico. She began producing videos on YouTube at the end of 2015 about her character "Bala", she had the nickname Bala since before she became a famous content creator, her parents were the ones who called her that since she was a child. It is a word game; a combination of the letters in her name Isabella, which also fits perfectly with her spontaneous and hyperactive way of being. She has two younger sisters named Luciana (Mini Bala) and Camila (Micro Bala) who have their own YouTube channel called Las Balitas.

== Career ==
In 2016, de la Torre started making videos of typical life situations, calling her fans "Balovers". It is a varied channel in terms of content, ranging from blogs, songs and reviews to annual awards such as the Kids' Choice Awards Mexico, televisión Argentina del canal, Telefe, Club Media Fest, Premios Tu Mundo and Spotify Awards.

On 23 August 2018, she released her first song called "Mi Momento", and later she released more songs, like: "Desde el Cielo" and "Soy Yo", as well as some musical parodies.

In October 2018, Bala launched her first book, which she called: Vistmond: The barracks of dreams, a fantasy story in which she invites all her followers to dream big: "I have always considered myself a dreamy girl. I think that little by little, and with the help of my family and my friends, I realized that dreams do not come true alone, but that you have to work on them every day. With this book I try to convey this message in an entertaining way to my readers ", commented the little author Bala. "I really like the subject of dreams and this idea arises because many times I dream of stories and I like to write them. And ‘Vistmond’ is the magical world that I would like to see, " Bala commented on the story he created for his book. "I started to write songs, poems, the book because what I read generates ideas that I try to transform to become my own. I hope my book does that for people, that's why I left the end open and because I would like to write the second one; I haven't started yet, but maybe it could be a saga. I am a person who imagines a lot, and I write it ".

After the contract, the singer had a stellar presence as a host at the Kids Chois Awards Mexico with Mexican singer Jaime Camil where she sang live and recognized the best of entertainment in various categories, such as Newcomer Artist, Favorite Comic YouTuber, Favorite Instagrammer and Best Fandom. and participated in the strip "Club 57" in addition to composing the song for the end of the series that included in its plot a time machine. "That participation in 'Club 57' was super stallion because I am a super fan of the 50s and I was very happy with the dress and everything," confesses la Torre.

In 2019 she released her song Infinitos. The successes for Bala did not stop there and in May 2019 she signed an exclusive representation contract with Nickelodeon Latin America with which her face became the exclusive image of the children's television network and was also an ambassador for all the content that was broadcast. produces on Nickelodeon. Nickelodeon Latin America worked on a comprehensive strategy with Bala that gave her the opportunity to develop consumer products and multiple marketing agreements with promotional partners in fashion and accessories, after which she commented: "I am very happy to be part of this great family, and I say 'family' because from the moment I met everyone at Nickelodeon, they made me feel like family, I've been watching the channel since I was very young, shows like the Kids' Choice Awards, and for me, being part of Nickelodeon right now is like a dream come true."

In 2020, she released a song called "Human" which was accompanied by a music video. A week later, the song was available on YouTube Music, Spotify and Deezer. The music video has more than 3.1 million views on YouTube, making it one of the most successful songs on her channel. And she released an English channel called Hey Bala! Was created. On April 30, 2020, he also released his song "Pijamas".

Also the following year she appeared in the film Lucha de Gigantes debuting as an actress with the role of "Beita". "I'm Ian's sister, a tomboy-like girl, a bit rude, but I think everything the script said from me is very funny. I sing ‘Who cares’ in the talent show and my brother starts throwing hints at my dad, and it gets very intense, "said Bala in the presentation of the film. He also participated in the movie Un papa pirata, in which Isabella de la Torre "Bala" appears, covering the song Who cares, originally performed by Alaska and Dinarama.

== Filmography ==
=== TV shows ===
Year	Title	Character	Role
2020	Club 57	She herself	Singer
2021	Planeta Bala	She herself	Ecologist

=== Movies ===
Year	Title	Character
2018	Ralph Breaks the Internet	Swati
2018	Lucha de Gigantes	Beita
2019	Un papá pirata	She herself

== Nominations and awards ==
Year	Award	Category	Nominated work	Outcome	Ref.
2016	Kids' Choice Awards México	Mejor influencer	She herself	Nominated	
2017	Kids' Choice Awards México	Mejor influencer	She herself	Nominated	
2019	Kids' Choice Awards México	Inspiración favorita	She herself	Won	
2020	Kids' Choice Awards México	Artista o grupo nacional favorito	She herself	Nominated	
2021	Kid's Choice Awards México	Inspiración	She herself	Won	
