= Jorge López (actor) =

Chilean actor

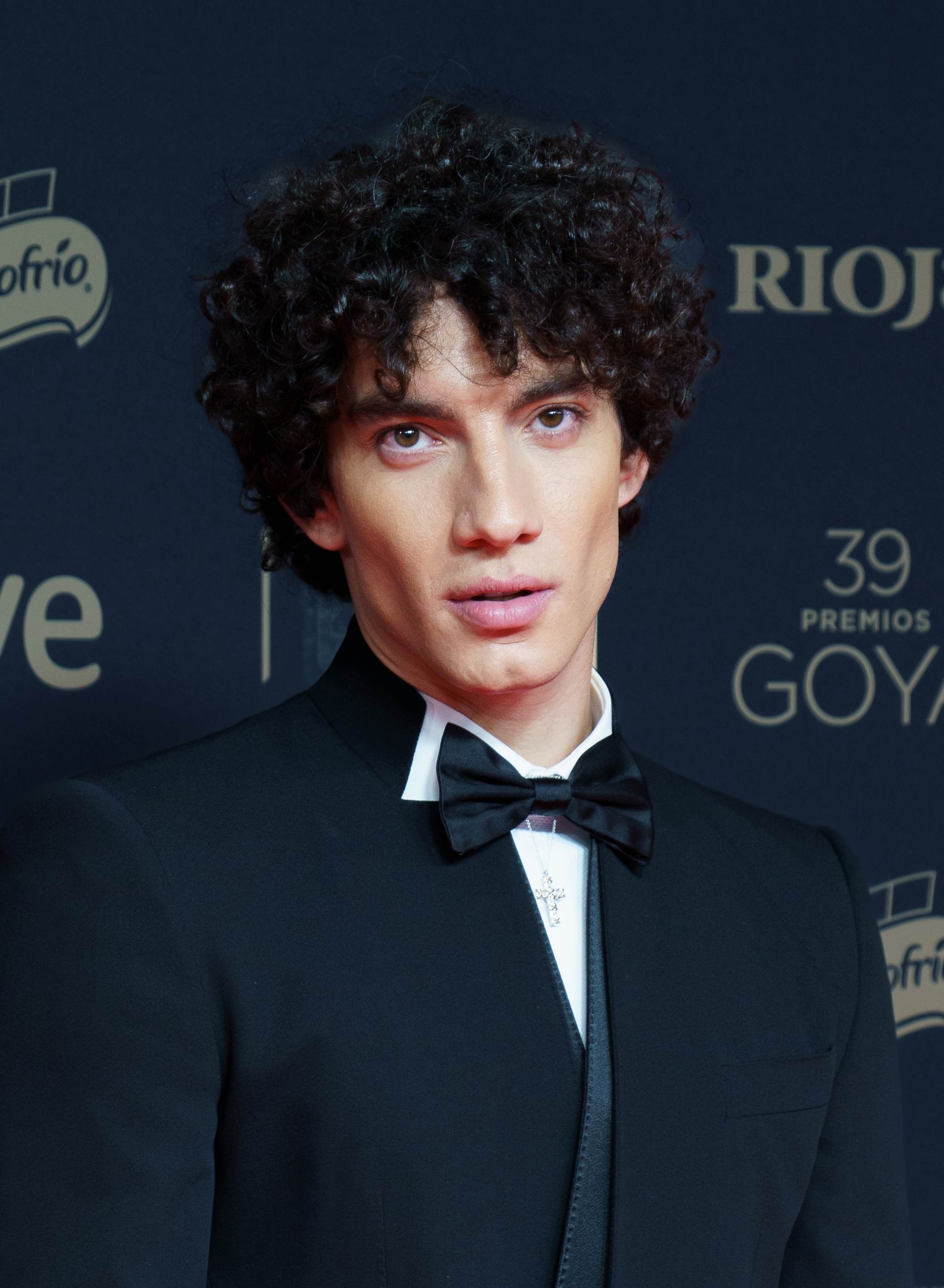
- López in 2025
- Born: Jorge López Astorga; 30 October 1991 (age 34); Llay Llay, Valparaíso, Chile
- Education: University for the Arts, Sciences, and Communication
- Years active: 2011–present
- Known for: Elite (Netflix)

Jorge López Astorga (born 30 October 1991) is a Chilean actor. Born in Llay Llay, Valparaíso, Chile, his first major role was in the Disney Channel Latin American telenovela Soy Luna (2016–2018). López played Valerio Montesinos in the Netflix series Elite, Lucrecia's half-brother.

He studied acting at the University for the Arts, Sciences, and Communication.

== Filmography ==
Films
Year	Title	Role	Notes
2011	Violeta Went to Heaven	Young Ángel	
2023	The Other Zoey	Diego	
2023	Sayen: La Ruta Seca	Gasper	

Series
Year	Title	Role	Notes
2012	Decibel 110	Jorge Ríos	8 episodes
2013	Los 80	Gustavo Morales	Episode: «La historia oficial» (season 6)
2014	Mamá Mechona	Presidente CEPSI	11 episodes
2016–2018	Soy Luna	Ramiro Ponce	Main cast; 219 episodes
2018	Wake Up	Iris	Lead role; 6 episodes
2019–2020	Elite	Valerio Montesinos Rojas	Main cast (seasons 2-3); 16 episodes
2022	Temporada de Verão	Diego	Main cast; 8 episodes
2022	Now and Then	Alejandro Vilas	8 episodes
2023–present	Operación Marea Negra	Fernando «Nando» Barreira Valdés	Lead role (season 2-3); 10 episodes
2023	Mala Fortuna	Michi Montefusco	Lead role; 8 episodes
2024	Bellas artes	Selk'nam	Episode: «Conciencia ecológica»
2025	Breakdown	Javier Lara Castillo	Main cast
