= Breakdown (TV series) =

Argentine-Mexican mystery thriller drama television series

- Spanish: Quebranto
- Genre: Drama; Thriller; Mystery
- Created by: Andrés Gelós; Natacha Caravia; Andrés Pascaner
- Starring: Tini Stoessel; Martín Barba; Jorge López; Antonio de la Vega; Otto Sirgo; Daniela Peña; Lucía Gómez-Robledo; Sebastián Silveti
- Composer: Camilo Lara
- Countries of origin: Mexico; Argentina
- Original language: Spanish
- No. of seasons: 1
- No. of episodes: 6

Production
- Executive producers: Jimena Arguelles; Patricio Rabuffetti; Leonardo Aranguibel; Fernando Barbosa
- Producers: Marina Donati; Marina Fernanda Briceno; Florencia Doynel; Manuela Grillo; Alex Sanchez; Priscila Uchôa
- Cinematography: Rodrigo Rocco Rodriguez
- Editor: Andres Riva Saft
- Running time: 42–49 minutes
- Production company: Non Stop Studios

Original release
- Network: Disney+
- Release: 15 August 2025

Breakdown (Spanish: Quebranto, lit. 'Brokenness') is an Argentine-Mexican mystery thriller drama television miniseries created by Andrés Gelós, Natacha Caravia and Andrés Pascaner for Disney+. The series plot follows Miranda Sanguinetti (Tini Stoessel), a young pianist woman, raised by an Argentine family, who decided to travel to Mexico, to discover the truth about her past and find clues about her biological family. However, her search for answers leads her into the hands of a criminal organization that soon throws her life into disarray. The first season premiered on August 15, 2025.

== Premise ==
Miranda Sanguinetti is a young Argentine woman raised with great affection by her adoptive family, who has anxiety disorders. She attributes her mental health struggles to the anguish caused by not knowing her origins. Because of that, she feels a strong pull to return to Mexico to learn the truth about her roots. Leo, her security guard, helps Miranda to find out the truth: she wasn't given up for adoption, but kidnapped right after birth. Determined to find those responsible, Miranda infiltrates the Lara Castillo family by exploiting her relationship with their recently arrived cousin from Chile, Javier. Unbeknownst to her, Javier is also using her to take control of the family's criminal enterprise. As Miranda seeks the truth, she is forced to face a high-stakes dilemma: choose between light and darkness, punishment and forgiveness, and the love of someone willing to die for her and someone poised to kill.

== Cast and characters ==
- Tini Stoessel as Miranda Sanguinetti
- Martín Barba as Leonardo Gutiérrez
- Jorge López as Javier Lara Castillo
- Antonio de la Vega as Emiliano Lara Castillo
- Rafael Ferro as Martín Sanguinetti
- Otto Sirgo as Santiago Lara Castillo
- Daniela Peña as Gabriela
- Lucía Gómez-Robledo as Victoria Lara Castillo
- Sebastián Silveti as Gerardo Lara Castillo
- Jyasú Torruco as Diego
- Karla Garrido as Sara
- Rebeca Manríquez as Elena
- Arelí González as Silvana Morales
- Daniela Vargas as María José Sanguinetti
- Albi De Abreu as Rafael Lara Castillo
- Leonidas Urbina as Sixto

== Production ==
=== Development ===
When Disney called us with such a powerful story, of course we wanted to be part of it. It was a matter of finding each piece, because it’s a very particular story. We needed to have the gears for the perfect machine. Together with the director, Bernardo de la Rosa, we began planning. Since it was such a complicated story—in the drama, the thriller elements, the special effects, in everything—it was very important for us to have not only the best at what they do, but also to build a crew made up of excellent professionals and excellent people.

— Jimena Argüelles, producer

The project was developed as an Disney+ original series, written by Andrés Gelós, Natacha Caravia, and Andrés Pascaner with Bernando de La Rosa serving as the series director. The series was produced by the Non Stop Studios company which was headed by Jimena Argüelles.

The creators pointed out that the series will oscillates between mystery, family intrigue, and emotional rawness, but that they don't want to make something too dark. In terms of some action elements in the series, they also added that although more and more action series are being produced in Mexico, they are still "not the norm". In an interview with The Hollywood Reporter, De la Rosa explains: "At the end of the day, it's a thriller, and the genre always has an element of suspense. We couldn't make something hyper-dark, but I did suggest from the beginning that all the characters started out broken. From that darkness, they move forward and discover the truth". In May 2024, it was announced that the provisional title for the project was Lost Girl, but was changed. Later that year, it was confirmed that the first season of the series would consist of six episodes. In December 2024, Disney+ Latin America shared the first trailer for the series, confirming that the title would be Quebranto, and its release was planned for the 2025. On July 21, 2025, the second teaser was released, revealing that the series would premiere on August 15, 2025.

=== Casting ===
Emilie Morán was in charge as a casting director. Tini Stoessel had been selected to star in the series in April 2024. It marks her return to acting in a lead role after more than a decade. She reflected on her return to acting and added: "Compared to the last project I worked on, which was Violetta, a show for younger audiences, this project touches on more adult themes and comes from a different life perspective. It was a big challenge for me compared to what I did years ago". Later that month, a photo with Stoessel, and actor Jorge López in a same studio appeared, which gave hints that he could participate in the same series with her.

The media also speculated that Stoessel would work together with Lali Espósito, Toto Ferro, and his father Rafael Ferro on the project, but it was confirmed that these were just rumours. In June 2024, it was officially confirmed that López and Rafael Ferro were part of the cast, along with Martín Barba. The following month the rest of the cast was added, that include Jyasú Torruco, Karla Garrido, Rebeca Manríquez, Areli González, Daniela Vargas and Albi De Abreu in recurring roles.

=== Filming ===
The series was filmed both in Argentina and Mexico. Argüelles explained that the shooting in two countries was relatively 'simple and smooth process', because Non Stop originated in Argentina and also has offices in Buenos Aires. Principal photography for the series began in June 2024 in Mexico City, Mexico. On July 30 of that year, filming concluded in Buenos Aires, Argentina, completing two months of recording.

== Episodes ==
=== Series overview ===
| Series | Episodes | Originally released |
|---|---|---|
| 1 | 06 | 15 August 2025 |

=== Season 1 (2025) ===
| No. overall | No. in season | Title | Directed by | Written by | Original release date |
|---|---|---|---|---|---|
| 1 | 1 | "Miranda" "Miranda" | Bernardo de la Rosa | Andrés Gelós, Natacha Caravia & Andrés Pascaner | 15 August 2025 |
Miranda suffers from panic attacks triggered by her repressed childhood memories; With the help of her security guard, Leonardo 'Leo' Gutiérrez, she learns that she was not adopted, but kidnapped right after birth; Her biological mother Gabriela, ended up in a psychiatric institution because she was tormented by the abuse she suffered at the hands of the Lara Castillo family.
| 2 | 2 | "Music From Another Time" "Música de otro tiempo" | Bernardo de la Rosa | Andrés Gelós, Natacha Caravia & Andrés Pascaner | 15 August 2025 |
After learning that she was taken from her mother, Miranda sets out to find out why and who is responsible; Gutiérrez takes her to Diego's auto repair shop; Miranda meets Javier Lara Castillo, who invites her to his family's nightclub.
| 3 | 3 | "Reasons for Not Returning" "Motivos para no volver" | Bernardo de la Rosa | Andrés Gelós, Natacha Caravia & Andrés Pascaner | 15 August 2025 |
Miranda arrives at Diego's house to find him dead; she desperately tries to reach Gutiérrez, who is being questioned as a suspect in Emiliano's attempted murder; Miranda seeks refuge at Silvana's house and considers returning to Argentina.
| 4 | 4 | "Your Daughter" "Tu hija" | Bernardo de la Rosa | Andrés Gelós, Natacha Caravia & Andrés Pascaner | 15 August 2025 |
Javier takes Miranda to see Emiliano; he tells Miranda that Gabriela was the one who gave up on him and that he tried to find her; when he learns that Gabriela is alive, he demands to see her; Emiliano offers Alcaraz a diplomatic solution.
| 5 | 5 | "Fallen Angel" "Ángel Caído" | Bernardo de la Rosa | Andrés Gelós, Natacha Caravia & Andrés Pascaner | 15 August 2025 |
Miranda takes Emiliano to meet Gabriela and together they learn about her past; Victoria orders Gutiérrez's murder and Javier's plan is revealed, putting the Lara Castillo family in a critical situation.
| 6 | 6 | "Nobody Said it Was Easy" "Nadie dijo que fuera fácil" | Bernardo de la Rosa | Andrés Gelós, Natacha Caravia & Andrés Pascaner | 15 August 2025 |
The truth costs Miranda dearly; she finds herself, but also suffers a great loss.
