= Club 57 (TV series) =

Italian-American television series

- Genre: Musical; Science fiction; Telenovela
- Created by: Catharina Ledoboer
- Directed by: Gustavo Cotta; Otto Rodríguez
- Starring: Evaluna Montaner; Riccardo Frascari; Carolina Mestrovic; Sebastián Silva; Martín Barba; Isabella Castillo; Andrés Mercado
- Music by: Ricardo Montaner; Mau and Ricky Montaner
- Countries of origin: Italy; United States
- Original languages: Spanish; Italian
- No. of seasons: 2
- No. of episodes: 120 (list of episodes)

Production
- Executive producers: Joanne Lee; Denise Bracci; Mario Anniballi; José Scheuren
- Producers: Iginio Straffi; Pierluigi Gazzolo
- Production locations: Miami, Florida; Apulia, Italy
- Cinematography: John Tarver; Eduardo Davila
- Camera setup: Multi-camera
- Running time: 45 minutes
- Production companies: Rainbow S.p.A.; Nickelodeon; Rai Ragazzi; Cinemat

Original release
- Network: Rai Gulp; Nickelodeon (Latin American TV channel)
- Release: 15 April 2019 – 22 October 2021

Club 57 is a television series developed by Rainbow SpA and Nickelodeon, which were both part of Viacom at the time. It was created by Catharina Ledoboer and produced by Iginio Straffi and Pierluigi Gazzolo. The series premiered on Rai Gulp in Italy on 15 April 2019, followed by its debut on Nickelodeon Latin America on 6 May 2019. The show follows a student from the 21st century named Eva (Evaluna Montaner) who accidentally travels to the year 1957. After Eva falls in love with an Italian greaser named JJ (Riccardo Frascari), she decides to stay in the past.

The show's first season was green-lit after Iginio Straffi held a meeting with other Nickelodeon creatives. Straffi wanted to co-develop another series with Nickelodeon after Winx Club. He watched an unaired pilot episode for Club 57, which was filmed at Viacom's Miami studio in 2016. Straffi took an interest in the concept, and at his direction, the show's male lead (JJ) was written as an Italian immigrant. Series creator Catharina Ledoboer worked closely with the Italian team during all aspects of production in order to suit the program for a European audience. Iginio Straffi brought over many of his former crew members from Winx Club to work on Club 57, including most of the writing staff and design team. (Note: Key Winx Club crew members who moved to Club 57 included: producer Iginio Straffi; executive producers Joanne Lee, Mario Anniballi, and Denise Bracci; writers Maurizio De Angelis, Chiara Capitanelli, and Angelica Gambini; production manager Paola Verdenelli; artistic director Marco Rossi)

The first sixty episodes were recorded over a period of six months, beginning in the Apulia region of Italy in September 2018 and continuing in Miami, Florida. During filming, the cast members studied films from the 1950s in order to accurately represent the time period. Riccardo Frascari, a native Italian speaker, learned the Spanish language for his role as JJ. The series' music was composed by Evaluna Montaner's father, Ricardo Montaner; her brothers, Mau and Ricky Montaner; and her fiancé, Camilo Echeverry. Club 57 premiered with high ratings, becoming the top-rated program in its time slot on Viacom's Telefe in May 2019.

In October 2019, Rainbow SpA's Andrea Graciotti stated that a second season was in development. Second season premiered in Latin America on Nickelodeon with its first 30 episodes between 14 June and 23 July 2021, last 30 episodes premiered between 13 September and 22 October 2021. There's no air date for season 2 in Italy.

== Premise ==
Eva (Evaluna Montaner) and Ruben (Sebastián Silva) are two siblings from the year 2019. After discovering an old time machine in their grandfather's laboratory, they accidentally send themselves back to the year 1957. As they try to find a way to return, Eva and Ruben initially try to stay as unnoticed as possible. Eva soon falls in love with an Italian boy named JJ (Riccardo Frascari), who works as a lighting technician for a popular dance show called Club 57. Eva also becomes friends with the show's lead performer, Amelia (Isabella Castillo), and provokes the ire of JJ's ex-girlfriend, Vero (Carolina Mestrovic). Not wanting to leave JJ, Eva decides to stay longer in the past. Meanwhile, Ruben starts selling his technology to his grandfather (Andrés Mercado), who is in his twenties in 1957.

Eva and Ruben's presence in 1957 attracts the attention of the Guardians of Time, a group of interdimensional agents monitoring the universe's timeline. They send an apprentice guardian named Aurek (Martín Barba) and his robotic assistant Droide (Jonathan Quintana) to catch the two siblings and stop their disruptions in the past. Eva and Ruben evade their capture and eventually return to 2019, but there they find that their actions in the past have had a butterfly effect on the present: their parents are no longer together and their grandfather is a spiteful millionaire. Eva and Ruben return to the past to undo their actions and recover their old lives.

== Cast ==
=== Main ===
- Evaluna Montaner as Eva
- Riccardo Frascari as JJ
- Sebastián Silva as Ruben
- Carolina Mestrovic as Vero
- Martín Barba as Aurek
- Isabella Castillo as Amelia
- Andrés Mercado as Manuel

=== Recurring ===
- Estefany Oliveira as Mercedes and Delaila
- Santiago Achaga as Tiago (season 2)
- Jonathan Freudman as Droide and Miguel
- Carlotta Bizzo as Francesca
- Lorenzo Maida as Nico
- Laura Rosguer as Maca
- Simoné Marval as Isa
- Ángela Rincón as Sofía
- Adriano Zendejas as Víctor
- Martina Lavignasse as Diana
- Santiago Bidart as Abel
- Mauricio Novoa as Checho
- Gael Sánchez as César
- Jesús Nasser as Fernando
- Frank Fernández as Andrés
- Gabriel López as Oso and Barba Negra
- Jorge Roguez as René
- Martha Picanes as the Cat Lady (Vero in the future)
- Luis Mayer as Xavier
- Xavier Coronel as Manuel in the future

== Development ==
=== Production ===
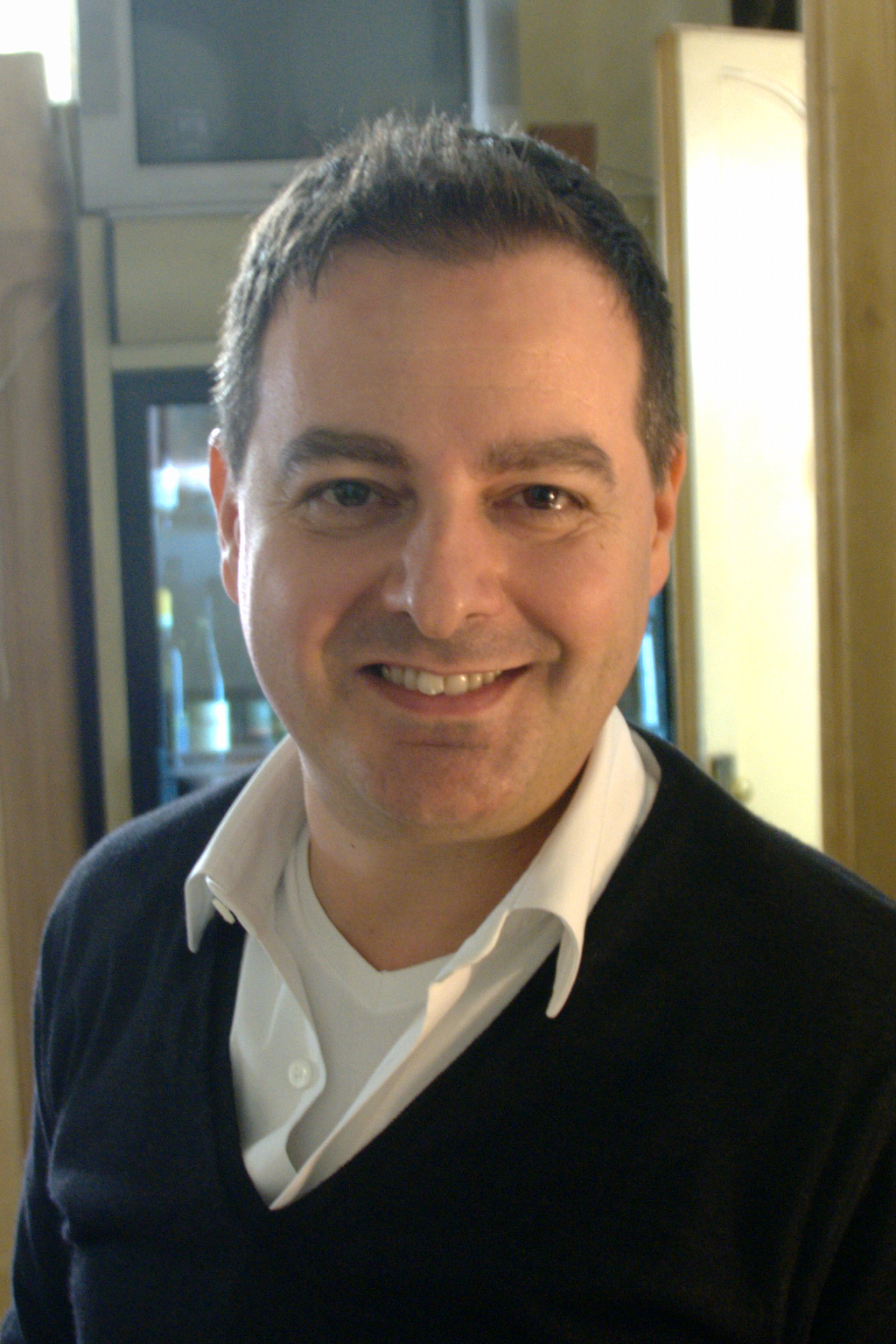
Series producer Iginio Straffi

Co-productions between Rainbow SpA and Nickelodeon, both part of Viacom, began in 2010 when they made new episodes of Winx Club together. At a 2017 meeting, Nickelodeon executives presented Rainbow's founder Iginio Straffi with potential follow-up projects to jointly produce. One was the pilot episode for Club 57, which was produced at Viacom's Miami studio in 2016. Rainbow held discussions with RAI to garner financial support for the show. In December 2017, Nickelodeon officially greenlit the series for a full season of 75 episodes, an order which was later reduced to 60 episodes.

At the direction of Rainbow, series creator Catharina Ledoboer rewrote the show's original outline to portray the character JJ as a 1950s Italian immigrant. Nickelodeon's vice president of programming, Tatiana Rodriguez, said in 2018 that this change helped the script have "greater depth." Ledoboer stated that "from the cast, the writing, all the way to the songs, Rainbow had a very important influence on the series to ensure that their audience would like it, not only in Italy but in the wider European community."

The show began filming on 24 September 2018 in the Italian city of Monopoli, Apulia. All of the show's exterior shots were filmed in the city of Martina Franca. Filming continued for six months, moving to Viacom's studio in Miami and involving an international cast of actors from the United States, Latin America, and Italy. Iginio Straffi, who produced the series alongside Pierluigi Gazzolo, commented that the multilingual cast "created real friendships... They have real chemistry. That was experiment number one accomplished!"

In total, over 2,700 minutes of footage were shot across 118 days of filming. After work on the first season wrapped, Iginio Straffi spoke about Rainbow and Nickelodeon's ongoing productions and said, "the know-how of Rainbow and the know-how of Nickelodeon are very complementary; the sensibilities of the Americans, with our European touch."

=== Casting ===
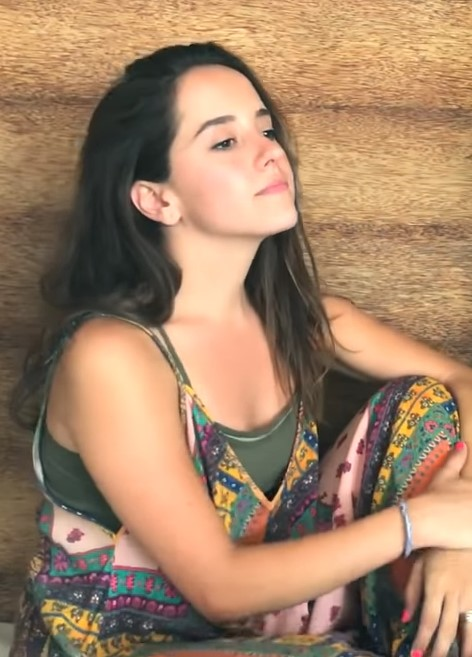
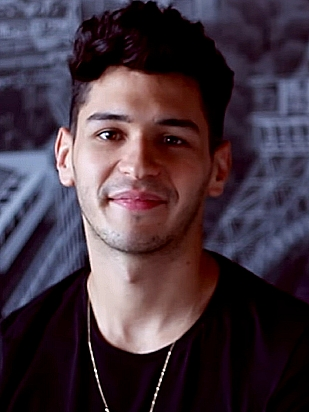
Evaluna Montaner and Sebastián Silva as main characters.

Actress and singer Evaluna Montaner was cast as the lead character, Eva. During the casting period, Montaner's father received a message from a friend, telling him that the show's lead role seemed fit for his daughter. Montaner's manager recommended that she audition for the character, who was named "Luca" at the time and renamed Eva after Evaluna got the part. For the show, Montaner sang multiple songs in both Spanish and Italian. Her father, brothers, and fiancé composed the music, continuing the Montaner family's tradition of creating songs together.

Riccardo Frascari, a native Italian, was cast as the show's male lead, JJ. Frascari first learned about the show in May 2018, when he was notified of a new Rainbow project looking for Italian actors who could dance, sing, and speak Spanish. Frascari sent Rainbow a video presentation of him singing a Spanish song, but he could not fluently speak the language at the time. After being cast as JJ, Frascari took an intensive Spanish class to become fluent.

With the exception of Evaluna Montaner and Sebastián Silva, most of the show's actors were given a list of 1950s films to study so that their characters would act like those from the time period. The cast members even took courses that covered "how they walked in the 50s, how they talked in the 50s, and what they ate." Montaner and Silva, whose characters Eva and Ruben are from the 21st century, were left out of the instruction so that their surprised reactions to the 1950s customs would come more naturally.

== Episodes ==
| Wave | Episodes | Originally released (Italy) | |
| Wave | Episodes | First released | Last released |
|---|---|---|---|
| 1 | 15 | 15 April 2019 | 3 May 2019 |
| 2 | 15 | 30 September 2019 | 16 October 2019 |
| 3 | 15 | 10 December 2019 | 26 December 2019 |
| 4 | 15 | 15 May 2020 | 4 June 2020 |

== Reception ==
When Club 57 was replayed on Viacom's Telefe network, it became the highest-rated program in its timeslot from May to July 2019, reaching a total of 17.8 million viewers. According to data from IBOPE Media, the Nickelodeon broadcast of Club 57 ranked as the top-rated program in Argentina and Mexico among the target audience of viewers aged 4–11. It also ranked as the second highest-rated series in Brazil and Colombia in the same age group. On the "Nick Play" mobile application, streams of the first season reached over 1.8 million viewers. On Nickelodeon's YouTube channel, music video clips from Club 57 achieved a combined total of over 30 million views, as of August 2019.

At RAI's Pulcinella Awards festival in Positano, Italy, Club 57 was nominated as the best live-action/hybrid TV series of 2019. At the 2019 Kids' Choice Awards Mexico, the series received multiple nominations: Favorite TV Show, Evaluna Montaner as Favorite Actress, and Riccardo Frascari and Sebastián Silva as Favorite Actor.

== Related media ==
=== Merchandise ===
In March 2019, Rainbow SpA announced a set of tie-in books based on the show, including a 128-page novel written from Eva's point of view. The books were released in Italy on 10 July 2019. Rainbow also launched a Club 57 magazine in October of the same year.

=== Live events ===
At the 2019 Giffoni Film Festival, Rainbow SpA held a "Rainbow Day" event featuring a performance from Riccardo Frascari as JJ. Then-unaired episodes of Winx Club and Club 57 were screened for the festival's jurors, and Frascari appeared for a question-and-answer session with fans.

On 30 November 2019, a live stage musical based on the series opened at the Teatro Gran Rex. It featured most of the television cast and all of the show's original songs. The stage show's plot was described by Billboard as a "spin-off" taking place after the first season's story.
