= Nickelodeon Mexico Kids' Choice Awards =

Annual entertainers award show

Nickelodeon Kids' Choice Awards México
- Previous: 2024 México Kids' Choice Awards; November 16, 2024
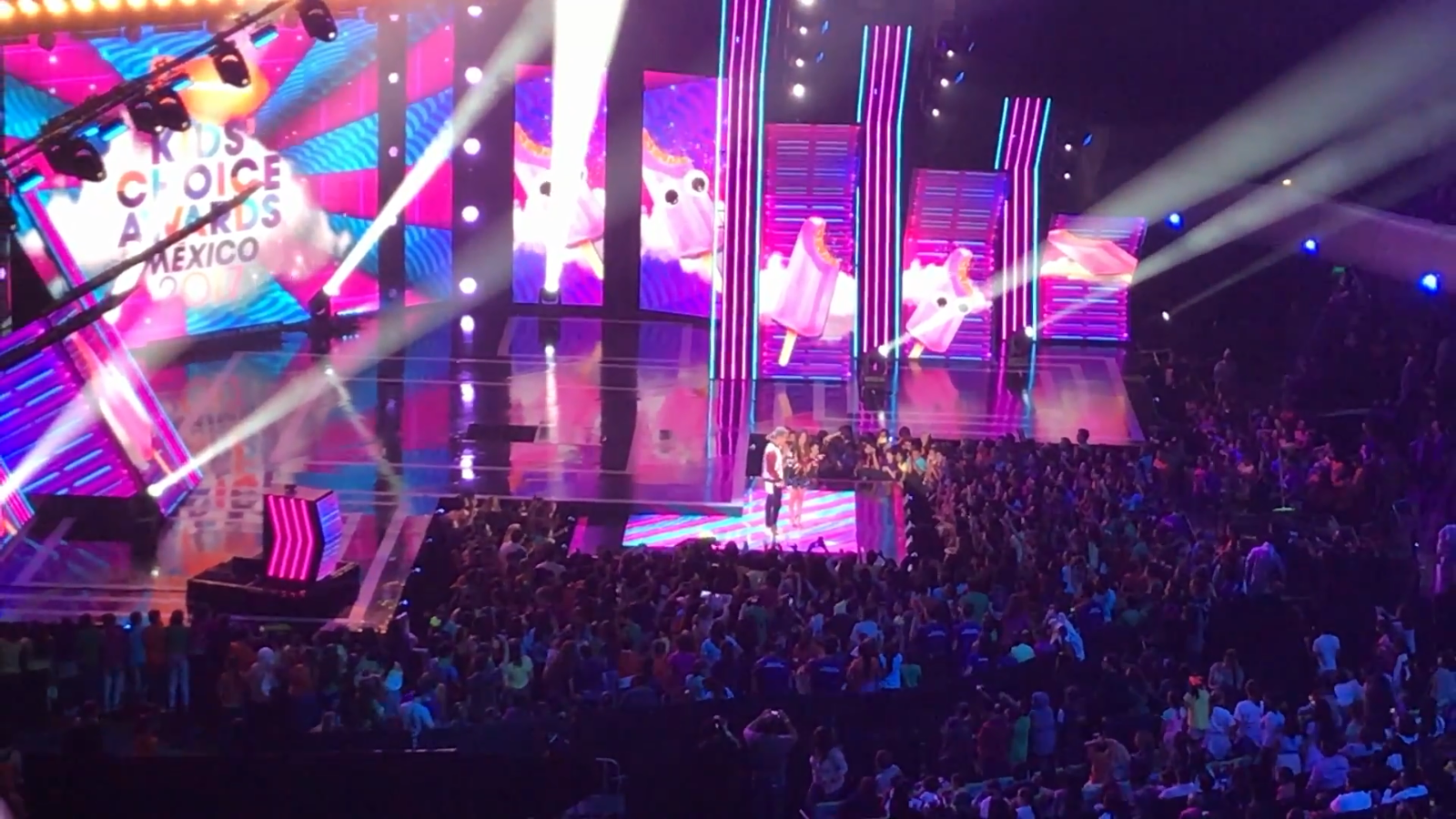
- Presenters at the 2017 show
- Country: Mexico
- Presented by: Nickelodeon
- Reward: KCA Blimp
- First award: 15 May 2003 as Mis Premios Nick; 4 September 2010 as KCA México
- Final award: November 19 2024
- Website: http://kcamexico.com

Television/radio coverage
- Network: Nickelodeon (Latin America)
- Runtime: Approx. 90–120 min. including commercials

The Nickelodeon Kids Choice Awards Mexico were an annual awards show that awards entertainers with a blimp trophy, as voted by children on the Internet. The show is usually held in September and televised days later through Nickelodeon.

== Hosts ==
Year	Date	Host(s)	Venue	City
2003	15 May	Arath de la Torre, Yordi Rosado and Wendy González	Six Flags México	Mexico City
2010	4 September	Anahí and Omar Chaparro	Six Flags México	Mexico City
2011	3 September	Danna Paola and Brian Amadeus	Six Flags México	Mexico City
2012	1 September	Jaime Camil	Pepsi Center WTC	Mexico City
2013	31 August	Jaime Camil	Pepsi Center WTC	Mexico City
2014	20 September	Roger González and Paty Cantú	Pepsi Center WTC	Mexico City
2015	15 August	Mario Bautista and Maite Perroni	Auditorio Nacional	Mexico City
2016	20 August	Galilea Montijo and Sebastián Villalobos	Auditorio Nacional	Mexico City
2017	19 August	Mario Bautista and Caelike	Auditorio Nacional	Mexico City
2018	18 August	Lesslie Polinesia, Karen Polinesia and Rafa Polinesio	Auditorio Nacional	Mexico City
2019	17 August	Jaime Camil and Isabella "La Bala"	Auditorio Nacional	Mexico City
2020	3 November	Camilo and Evaluna Montaner	Virtual Show	Mexico City
2021	7 September	Bryan SKabeche, Eddy SKabeche and Fede Vigevani	Pepsi Center WTC (Virtual Show)	Mexico City
2022	30 August	Danna Paola, Alex Hoyer and Luis de la Rosa	Auditorio Nacional	Mexico City
2023	29 August	Juanpa Zurita and Macarena Achaga	Auditorio Nacional	Mexico City
2024	16 November	Ángela Aguilar and Michael Ronda	Auditorio Nacional	Mexico City
2025	No ceremony held due to Paramount International Networks pause of several MTV events			

== Editions ==
=== 2010 edition ===
In June 2010, Viacom gave the rights for Mexico to release their own version of the Kids' Choice Awards. The awards ceremony took place on 4 September 2010 at "El Teatro Chino de Six Flags" (The Chinese Theater of Six Flags) of the Six Flags México park. It was presented by Omar Chaparro and Anahí. The show was not televised until 14 October 2010. The award show was a low-budget production. Presented via a 'giant screen' were special messages from the cast of iCarly (Miranda Cosgrove, Jennette McCurdy, Nathan Kress, Jerry Trainor and Noah Munck), and Canadian singer Justin Bieber in acceptance of their wins for the categories of Favorite TV Show and Favorite Song respectively.

=== 2011 edition ===
Filmed on 3 September 2011 in Six Flags, Mexico, and premiered on 22 September. It was hosted by Danna Paola and Brian Amadeus from Moderatto. Some of the winners were Big Time Rush For Favorite International TV Show and Favorite International Artist, and Katy Perry for Favorite Song, and Grachi was the biggest winner of the night with three awards won, including Favorite TV Show.

=== 2012 edition ===
It was confirmed a 3rd edition for the KCA México, it took place on Pepsi Center on 1 September 2012, and was first telecast on 18 September, it was hosted by Jaime Camil, the greatest winner was Miss XV, some international winners were iCarly for Favorite International TV Show and One Direction for Favorite International Artist and Favorite Song.

=== 2013 edition ===
The "Kids Choice Awards Mexico 2013" were held on 31 August 2013 at the Pepsi Center in Mexico City, Jaime Camil was the host again, and the Colombian categories were presented by Colombian actor Andrés Mercado. Some of the winners were Victorious for "Favorite TV Show", Big Time Rush for "Favorite International Artist" and One Direction for "Favorite Song".

=== 2014 edition ===
The awards ceremony were held on 20 September but aired on Nickelodeon on 25 September the hosts were singer Paty Cantú and presenter Roger González.

=== 2015 edition ===
The awards took place on 15 August 2015 at the National Auditorium, the presenters were the singers Maite Perroni and Mario Bautista.

=== 2016 edition ===
The awards were held on 20 August 2016 in Mexico City, the broadcast on Nickelodeon took place only on 23 August 2016, the presenters were Galilea Montijo and the Colombian YouTuber Sebastián Villalobos, with musical performances of Dulce María, CD9, Sebastián Yatra, Urband 5 and Ha*Ash.

=== 2017 edition ===
The awards were held on 19 August 2017 in Mexico City, the broadcast on Nickelodeon took place only on 22 August 2017, the presenters were Mario Bautista and YouTuber Caeli, had music performances from Río Roma, Fifth Harmony, CNCO and Pitbull.

=== 2018 edition ===
The event took place on 18 August 2018 at the National Auditorium in Mexico City. It was broadcast by Nickelodeon Latin America on 21 August and was presented by the trio of YouTubers Lesslie Yadid, Ana Karen and Rafael Velázquez (Los Polinesios).

=== 2019 edition ===
The event took place on 17 August 2019 at the National Auditorium in Mexico City. It was broadcast on Nickelodeon Latin America on 20 August and was hosted by YouTuber La Bala and Jaime Camil for the third occasion.

=== 2020 edition ===
Due to the COVID-19 pandemic, the event took place on 3 November 2020 in the format of a virtual show, it was presented by Camilo and Evaluna Montaner.

=== 2021 edition ===
The edition of the Kids' Choice Awards Mexico 2021 was held on 7 September 2021 through Nickelodeon. As in the previous year, the awards were held virtually and were hosted by internet personalities Bryan SKabeche, Eddy SKabeche and Fede Vigevani. The ceremony, in addition to being broadcast on the channel, was broadcast live on YouTube and Facebook.

=== 2022 edition ===
The edition of the Kids' Choice Awards México 2022 was held on 30 August 2022 through Nickelodeon. For the first time in two years, it was face-to-face and was hosted by personalities Alex Hoyer, Danna Paola and Luis de la Rosa. The ceremony, in addition to being broadcast on the channel, was broadcast live on YouTube and Facebook on Pluto TV.

=== 2023 edition ===
The edition of the Kids' Choice Awards México 2023 took place on 26 August at the National Auditorium in Mexico City and was broadcast on 29 August 2023. It had the participation of Juanpa Zurita and Macarena Achaga as hosts. They included Kidz Bop, Picus, Daniela Calle, Aitana, Mario Bautista and Alex Hoyer as performances for the ceremony.

=== 2024 edition ===
The edition of the Kids' Choice Awards Mexico 2024 took place on November 16 in Mexico City, it was hosted by Ángela Aguilar and Michael Ronda and the broadcast on TV on November 19.

== See also ==
- Nickelodeon Kids' Choice Awards
- Kids' Choice Awards Argentina
- Kids' Choice Awards Colombia
- Meus Prêmios Nick
