= Brussels International Fantastic Film Festival =

Annual film festival for speculative fiction film held in Brussels, Belgium

Coordinates: 50°51′53.05″N 4°20′51.02″E

- Location: Brussels, Belgium
- Founded: 1983
- Language: International
- Website: bifff.net

The Brussels International Fantastic Film Festival (BIFFF), previously named Brussels International Festival of Fantastic Film (French: Festival international du film fantastique de Bruxelles, Dutch: Internationaal Festival van de Fantastische Film van Brussel) was created in 1983 as a venue for horror, thriller and science fiction films. It takes place in Brussels, every year in March.

Initially organized by Annie Bozzo, Gigi Etienne, Freddy Bozzo, Georges Delmote and Guy Delmote, it now has prizes in both feature-length and short films, and also hosts an international body-painting competition.

== Winners ==
=== Golden Raven ===
| Year | Film title | Director | Ref. |
|---|---|---|---|
| 1983 | Wild Hunt of King Stach | Valery Rubinchik | |
| 1984 | Nightmares | Joseph Sargent | |
| 1985 | Dreamscape | Joseph Ruben | |
| 1986 | Little Flames | Peter Del Monte | |
| 1987 | Radioactive Dreams | Albert Pyun | |
| 1988 | Angustia | Bigas Luna | |
| 1989 | Paperhouse | Bernard Rose | |
| 1990 | La banyera | Jesús Garay | |
| 1991 | A Paucity of Flying Dreams | Eizō Sugawa | |
| 1992 | Timescape | David Twohy | |
| 1993 | Army of Darkness | Sam Raimi | |
| 1994 | Frauds | Stephan Elliott | |
| 1995 | Accumulator 1 | Jan Svěrák | |
| 1996 | The Day of the Beast | Álex de la Iglesia | |
| 1997 | Luna e l'altra | Maurizio Nichetti | |
| 1998 | Lawn Dogs | John Duigan | |
| 1999 | Ring (Ringu) | Hideo Nakata | |
| 2000 | The Nameless | Jaume Balagueró | |
| 2001 | The Isle | Kim Ki-duk | |
| 2002 | Dog Soldiers | Neil Marshall | |
| 2003 | Cypher | Vincenzo Natali | |
| 2004 | Save the Green Planet! | Jang Joon-hwan | |
| 2005 | Marebito | Takashi Shimizu | |
| 2006 | Adam's Apples | Anders Thomas Jensen | |
| 2007 | The Host | Bong Joon-ho | |
| 2008 | 13 Beloved | Chookiat Sakveerakul | |
| 2009 | Let the Right One In | Tomas Alfredson | |
| 2010 | Orphan | Jaume Collet-Serra | |
| 2011 | I Saw the Devil | Kim Jee-woon | |
| 2012 | The Awakening | Nick Murphy | |
| 2013 | Ghost Graduation | Javier Ruiz Caldera | |
| 2014 | Witching & Bitching | Álex de la Iglesia | |
| 2015 | Frankenstein | Bernard Rose | |
| 2016 | I Am a Hero | Shinsuke Sato | |
| 2017 | Better Watch Out | Chris Peckover | |
| 2018 | Inuyashiki | Shinsuke Sato | |
| 2019 | Little Monsters | Abe Forsythe | |
| 2021 | Vicious Fun | Cody Calahan | |
| 2022 | Vesper | Kristina Buožytė, Bruno Samper | |
| 2023 | Talk to Me | Danny and Michael Philippou | |
| 2024 | Steppenwolf | Adilkhan Yerzhanov | |
| 2025 | Twilight of the Warriors: Walled In | Soi Cheang | |
| 2026 | Never After Dark | Dave Boyle | |

== See also ==
- List of fantastic and horror film festivals
- Méliès International Festivals Federation
