= A Ton of Luck =

Soñar no Cuesta Nada
- Theatrical release poster
- Directed by: Rodrigo Triana
- Screenplay by: Jörq Hiller
- Produced by: Clara María Ochoa
- Starring: Diego Cadavid; Juan Sebastian Aragón; Manuel José Chávez; Marlon Moreno; Carolina Ramirez
- Cinematography: Sergio Garcia
- Edited by: Alberto Ponce
- Music by: Nicolás Uribe
- Release date: August 11, 2006
- Running time: 100 minutes
- Country: Colombia
- Language: Spanish

A Ton of Luck, (Spanish: Soñar no Cuesta Nada) is a 2006 Colombian black comedy film directed by Rodrigo Triana. Based on a true story, the plot follows a group of anti-guerrilla soldiers, whose lives are turned upside down after finding $45 million hidden in the jungle.

== Plot ==
The film begins with a young mother named Herlinda (Carolina Ramírez) and her 6 year old daughter Simona who comes to a remote village in southern Colombia, Herlinda asks a grocer go to the village of Coreguaje but a driver accepts carry them but then refuses to see the lady but she had little money and Simona convince him.

Them being carried by the driver, Herlinda reads a letter from her husband Elmer Porras, soldier of the national army of Colombia, who several days ago had lost the life savings of between Herlinda and a real estate business which resulted in running a scam that pushes the family into possible bankruptcy.

The story moves to a few days ago in soldiers are faced with the ultimate temptation, which affects their ethical standards in different ways. Justo Perlaza (Carlos Manuel Vesga), Silvio Lloreda (Diego Cadavid), Nelson Venegas (Juan Sebastian Aragon) and Porras (Manuel Jose Chaves) are four soldiers in the Colombian Army who are part of a counter-guerrilla unit dedicated to ferreting out revolutionaries who have set up camp in the nation's jungles. Porras is married and a dedicated family man, while the others are single and like to party hard when they are not on duty. The four soldiers visit a brothel in a nearby town in the battalion, in the above mentioned place the soldiers initiate a muss because of Perlaza's obsession towards an attractive prostitute known as Dayana (Verónica Orozco). The next day the soldiers firing anti-guerrilla combat against a FARC front which managed to escape the siege. After cleaning up after an ambush by guerillas, a few meters from the site of the battle, the soldiers find a guerilla camp whose occupants before fleeing had few provisions, having to feed on sugar water and apes, and close to the camp the soldiers seized a small arsenal of the guerrillas, but Solorzano noted that several soldiers of the troops suffering from diarrhea and malaria and calls for air support to take out soldiers and Major Loaiza (Julio Correal) warns that transport can not send them out of the jungle by weather issues.

A few minutes later the soldiers learn that their mission is not only to fight the guerrillas but rescue American engineers held hostage by the guerrillas, an order which Venegas berates Lieutenant Solorzano (Marlon Moreno) who in his position reminds him of his duty as a soldier. The soldiers also scanty of provisions sup on the same night rice with meat of ape but the above mentioned situation it begins to disappoint the soldiers, and to the moment Perlaza excreting in spite of the diarrhea it fixes his survival knife in something that seems to be anti-personnel mines but for his surprise it is the hiding place of an enormous quantity of money hidden in a can. Perlaza reported the discovery to his friends who early in the morning discover not only the money in the can but more money contained in more cans. The only one in rejecting the money is Porras, but accidental Lloreda actives a mine provoking a small explosion that alerts the soldiers. Solorzano discovers fragments of bills falling down as a result of the explosion, Solorzano discovers his soldiers makes a surprising discovery—several tubs buried in the jungle which hold $40 million in cash, hidden by drug kingpins in cahoots with the guerillas. While Porras predictably maintains they should leave the money and tell Lieutenant Solorzano about it, the others want to take the fortune for themselves. The soldiers decide not to appropriate only but also to distribute between if the same Colombian pesos and the contained dollars. Porras insists report money to battalion command peers reject her suggestion knowing that in a country so corrupt that money passed into the hands of corrupt politicians but Porras insists report the money to the command of the battalion but his companions reject his suggestion knowing that in such a corrupt country the above mentioned money would go on to hands of corrupt politicians, Solorzano orders Porras to be silence and Porras in turn it rejected his part of the booty by principles but Perlaza vainly tries to convince him that he can of the use the money to him after what he had lost in the real estate business. In the following days the soldiers invest money in each basic necessities, also exchanged pesos for dollars, betting and finally using some dollars to fuel a fire. However, the soldiers begin to lose patience not only due to lack of food but also the desire to go to a nearby town or village and invest money. A helicopter ride to see the sky, Venegas fired his gun to draw attention which fails and insists Lieutenant Solorzano ask the battalion air transport but Solorzano replied that he can not send the battalion after calling several times, Venegas desperate shooting at his own leg, thus giving the argument Lieutenant Solorzano to take the squad of the jungle.

Solorzano called the battalion arguing that after a guerrilla harassment of one of the soldiers had been hurt and the Mayor Loaiza decides to send helicopters to bring the soldiers. Solorzano requires soldiers to hide the money so that nobody in the battalion suspected. Half an hour later two helicopters arrive, one that collects the weapons seized and the injured Venegas, the other picks up the squad. This helicopter does not reach the military airport but a road that would take them to the battalion, hence the soldiers should go to the military airport.

Soldiers along the way discovered a small shop in a village, and the soldiers pay a large sum of money to the shopkeeper (Gloria Gómez) who gives them bread, stew, fruit, soft drinks, etc. food enjoyed by soldiers. Soon Solorzano communicates again with the battalion and Major Loaiza requires troop battalion comes soon, knowing that walking would not arrive, Solorzano comes with the troops at a rest stop and pay a driver (the same guy who brings days later Herlinda) and a trucker (Álvaro Rodríguez) for the lead to military airport. During the trip Perlaza argues that the Virgin Mary had given the money in the jungle.

Shortly after the military airport manager requires the captain (Ramsés Ramos) to make a requisition for be sure that the soldiers had not stolen the AK47 rifles but the soldiers begins be fearing to be discovered, but Porras not having accepted the money goes from first to requisition without the captain find nothing but the stink of his backpack. But at the moment requisitioned to Lloreda, Lieutenant Solorzano receives a call from Mayor Loaiza who demands to see the troops soon, so the soldiers addressed the Hercules aircraft en route to the battalion. Porras is hailed by soldiers for passing first through the requisition, and the joyful moment when the soldiers sang the anthem of the military forces of Colombia, an angry Lloreda threatens to detonate a grenade due that someone had stolen his part of the money, his companions ask him not to do it and there is discovered that Corporal Cataño stolen the money for what Solorzano demands from him to return it to what Cataño refuses and underestimates that Lloreda makes explode the grenade but Lloreda pulls the spike of the grenade but is stopped by other soldiers.

The soldiers come unharmed to the battalion and come to the bedrooms where Venegas had come before after having got treatment for his wounded leg, Perlaza tries to tell him what had happened in the plane. For his part Lloreda is sent to psychology and the psychologist tries to investigate on his behavior in the plane that could have unleashed a tragedy, but Lloreda answers suffer post-traumatic stress because of battling in the jungle. To the moment Lloreda it comes to the bedrooms where his companions suspect and are afraid that it has betrayed them, Lloreda denies to have done it. The Lieutenant Solorzano believes him, since if it had betrayed them, the military police already would be requisitioning the beds and the belongings, Solorzano returns the money to him and it is required silence from him while he would ask for a permission the Major Loaiza in order that the soldiers could go out for the nearby people and get out the money, which it obtains to the moment; Loaiza has given a permission of exit for one day, therefore Solorzano demands from the soldiers the soldiers not to call the attention with the money because it would cause a domino effect that would fuck them all.

Lloreda, Perlaza, Porras and Venegas go on a taxi into town and Venegas gives the driver (Frank Beltrán) a wad of cash to accompany them all day. the four soldiers spend money on fine clothes and sportswear, in relaxation in a spa and an elegant restaurant. Porras being the only one who had no money he was invited by his friends and by his side Lloreda buy a luxury van. Finally the 4 other soldiers accompanied by their partners come to the brothel and taking more wads of cash paid to the owner (Federico Lorusso) to organize a private party. Perlaza go to the room where is Dayana who was about to have sex with another man, but Perlaza throws the man of the room and gives him money. Dayana claims him for his action and Perlaza answers him that it does not want sex with her but to want to have a serious relation with her, declaring his love, Dayana is surprised at his words and seeing that as welded tape-worm a scanty salary would not be possible to have a stable relation but Perlaza shows her all the money that had of the cove, as what both have sex. Meanwhile in the bar, the soldiers and the driver enjoy the extravagant party and Perlaza given the news of his possible engagement with Dayana. Porras is the only one that is not about prostitutes being faithful to his marriage vows and leaves the party vowing to always care for their friends.

Herlinda and Simona continue their journey even reading the letter her husband coming to a small village and a coachman offers bring as close as possible to the sidewalk, in the letter according Porras despite the joy already happen 'from laughter to tears '.

The party in the brothel continues until the dawn. A sergeant in the battalion warns his superior of an anonymous call making serious accusations against a soldier; Perlaza awake in the room discovered that Dayana was gone and had stolen the money, he tries ask for it, but Perlaza is arrested by men of the military police and knowing that Dayana had not only stolen, also betrayed him.

Lloreda meantime the battalion arrives in his new van so striking entrance soldier who alerts the Mayor Loaiza. Later, other soldiers trying to enter the battalion but are immediately arrested, Venegas from the taxi to see this situation know that they will also catch him and tries to flee, but not before hiding the money within a TV and sends his family with express orders not to turn it on, but his younger brother ignoring the situation turns on the TV, and the TV explodes what triggers anger Venegas's dad. Venegas is subsequently arrested and taken in the same van that seconds before Perlaza who urges his friend to flee. Lloreda is taken to judgment being a judge the Major Loaiza. Lloreda denies to know on the money of the guerrilla warfare arguing to buy the luxurious light truck with the savings of the salary, but Loaiza does not believe him since a soldier gains less than one minimum wage. Then a soldier enters the court room wing reporting to Major Loaiza had found nothing in Lloreda belongings or truck except a camera whose roll is sent to reveal by the Mayor. Lloreda begins to fear and this photographic roll there are compromising photos of him and the soldiers in the jungle with the money, the Major Loaiza offers Lloreda to betray to negotiate since it was compromised up to the neck. Later Loaiza interrogates Venegas for whom before he was feeling admiration but then disappointment on having known that he had taken possession of this illegal money. Venegas defends himself arguing that would return to take the money in the same opportunity to finance his career as official. Mayor Loaiza warns Venegas with such decision ruined his career but Venegas makes a scandal and refuses to betray the whereabouts of the money. The soldiers are imprisoned but Lloreda is led by soldiers of the military police and his colleagues believe that he betrayed them except Perlaza and Venegas who know that Dayana was who had betrayed but that does not matter to Perlaza who believes what happened to her was worth it.

Porras guessing what would happen decides to desert the army. His wife Herlinda arrives at the store where he and the other soldiers had eaten and had given large sums of money for the service. While Simona was with the shopkeeper to drink water, Herlinda learns the scandal by the radio news of the soldiers who had found the stash of money from FARC whose maximum amount was $40 million. Porras days before send the letter to his wife, who had been reading all this time Herlinda on this adventure. On instructions from her husband in that letter, Herlinda go to a makeshift bathroom where in middle of three rocks found a backpack with many wads of cash, in another letter within the bag, Porras in that letter acknowledges having taken his share of the money, who had tried to give Solorzano and Perlaza. Porras agree that stolen money but knowing what had taken needs of his wife and daughter, but nevertheless Porras loves them and communicate with them soon. Herlinda burst into tears but conceals at his daughter and tells her that they would soon see their husband and father and both walk the horizon.

The movie finishes with Perlaza, Venegas, Porras and Lloreda respectively those who present themselves being observed in the mirror the same day they bought fine clothes.

== Cast ==
- Diego Cadavid - Silvio Lloreda
- Juan Sebastian Aragón - Nelson Venegas
- Manuel José Chávez – Elmer Porras
- Marlon Moreno – Lieutenant Víctor Solorzano
- Carlos Vergara - Corporal Edmundo Cataño
- Carolina Ramirez – Herlinda
- Carlos Manuel Vesga - Justo Perlaza
- Ramsés Ramos – Captain Edwin Camacho
- Julio Correal - Major Álvaro Loaiza
- Gloria Gomez - Shop owner
- Alexander Palacio - Willis' Driver
- Verónica Orozco – Dayana
- Leonardo Krys - Judge

== Reception ==
Based on a true story, Soñar No Cuesta Nada (aka A Ton Of Luck) was directed by Rodrigo Triana, an established name in Colombian television. When the film was released its real-life counterparts were on trial, 50 out of the 150 soldiers who took a share of the money were caught.

Soñar No Cuesta Nada was Colombia's submission to the 79th Academy Awards for the Academy Award for Best Foreign Language Film, but was not accepted as a nominee.

== Spin-off ==
In 2008, RCN Television produced a series called Regreso a la guaca, a spin-off of the film.
