= Undocumented (film) =

2010 American found footage horror film by Chris Peckover

- Film poster
- Directed by: Chris Peckover
- Written by: Joe Peterson; Chris Peckover
- Produced by: Jessica Wu; Keith Calder; Josh Finn
- Starring: Scott Mechlowicz; Alona Tal; Yancey Arias; Peter Stormare
- Cinematography: Matt Gulley
- Edited by: Glenn Garland; Jim May
- Production company: Snoot Entertainment
- Distributed by: IFC Midnight
- Release date: September 2010 (Fantastic Fest)
- Running time: 91 minutes
- Country: United States
- Language: English

Undocumented is a 2010 independent horror thriller directed by Chris Peckover and written by Chris Peckover and Joe Peterson. It stars Scott Mechlowicz, Alona Tal, Yancey Arias, Kevin Weisman and Peter Stormare.

== Plot ==
Filmmakers Travis, William, Liz, Davie, and Jim are filming a documentary on undocumented Mexican migrants. After interviewing several of Davie's family members and harassing an employer of undocumented migrants named Whitaker, the group accompanies a large group of migrants, including Davie's cousin Alberto and his wife and child, across the Mexico–United States border.

Once in the United States, the truck carrying the immigrants is intercepted by what seems to be the United States Border Patrol. The truck is taken to a facility where the filmmakers are interrogated and the migrants taken captive. The group that has taken them is a radical patriot group that despises undocumented migrants, Mexicans in particular. The patriots, led by Z, makes the filmmakers a proposition: film the patriots and document their torture of undocumented migrants, in exchange for their own freedom, or die along with the migrants. The leader of the patriots lets all of the immigrant children go, including Alberto's daughter.

The filmmakers are tasked with filming the torture of a drug smuggler. Liz tries to intervene but the migrant is beaten to death. The next morning, one of Z's henchman give the filmmakers a tour of the facility. When they are shown around the ‘pens’ holding men and women, Alberto becomes enraged and is sprayed by a high-pressure hose. He is then quizzed on American government and history. If he gets a question wrong, his wife's joints are pulled into stress positions. When asked which historical figure said "Give me liberty or give me death!", Alberto incorrectly answers Thomas Jefferson after being given the answer by William. His wife and William are killed.

The same night, the group tries to escape from the facility by using the night vision mode on their camera. After a close call, they find the body of Alberto's daughter caught in razor wire outside. Alberto's grieving alerts Z's henchman and a watchdog that mangles Jim's arm and leg. The group is recaptured, with a permanent guard standing watch outside their room. They are then forced to film the organ removal of a migrant who is conscious. Witnessing the scene causes Jim to collapse.

After trying to signal a truck that turns out to be operated by one of Z's henchmen, Davie's aunt is killed, and Davie is beaten to death after attacking a henchman. Travis is then forced to ‘interview’ Whitaker and the coyote who led the migrants into Mexico. Both are subsequently killed by Z. As a ‘parting gift’, Liz and Travis are branded with the radical group's symbol. A sedated and delirious Travis is forced to swing a baseball bat at a piñata that is unknowingly wrapped around Jim. Liz attempts to kill Z with the bat, but is also sedated before she can strike him.

Travis and Liz are told they will be held indefinitely. Travis beats their guard to death and steals his gun, shooting a second henchman in the leg. Travis and Liz release the migrants and save Alberto. When they attempt to start an old truck, Z nearly kills Travis, but he is shot by Alberto. The three escapees reach help, and state police raid the compound. Alberto is sent back to Mexico after nine months and anonymous tapes are sent to a media centre in Arizona, showing Z with an even larger group.

== Cast ==
- Scott Mechlowicz as Travis
- Alona Tal as Liz
- Peter Stormare as Z
- Yancey Arias as Alberto
- Kevin Weisman as Jim
- Greg Serano as Davie
- Noah Segan as Klaus
- Nicholas Tucci as The Artist
- Adam Kulbersh as Remy
- Jose Marquez as Miguel
- Deborah Martinez as Ophelia
- Castulo Guerra as Coyote
- Greta Quezada as Marta
- Julianne Flores as Pregnant Girl
- Miguel Martinez as Donor
- Nya Serano as Davie's Daughter
- Myrna Vigil as Hysterical Woman
- Giovanni Olsen as Grandson
- Marc Miles as Sheriff
- Richard Christie as Deputy
- Emelie O'Hara as Student #1
- Arron Shiver as Film Professor
- Kevin Wiggins as Tow Truck Driver
- Jsu Garcia as El Torro
- Leonardo Krys as the Judge
- Tom Connolly as Brad
- Tim Draxl as William
- Christopher Dempsey as Border Patrol Officer Marsh
- Chad Brummett as Whitaker
- Adam Kulbersh as Remy
- Christian Di Salvo as Dead Body
- Rafael Herrera as Bushy eyebrows
- Amy Baklini as Prisoner
- Casey Adams as Student
- Carmen Corral as Maria
- Jesus Mayorga as Cholo
- Lorél Medina as Selina
- Tina Borek as Maid Maria
- Chris Bentley as Graduate Student
