= Eva Lasting =

Colombian television series

- Spanish: La primera vez
- Genre: Romantic drama
- Created by: Dago García
- Directed by: Mateo Stivelberg; María Gamboa
- Starring: Emmanuel Restrepo; Francisca Estévez; Santiago Alarcón; Verónica Orozco; Sergio Palau; Brandon Figueredo; Mateo García; Julián Cerati; Sara Pinzón
- Narrated by: Jacques Toukhmanian
- Theme music composer: Manuel Medrano; Juliana Velásquez; Santiago Uribe
- Opening theme: "La primera vez" by Manuel Medrano and Juliana Velásquez
- Composer: Santiago Uribe
- Country of origin: Colombia
- Original language: Spanish
- No. of seasons: 4
- No. of episodes: 45

Production
- Executive producers: Dago García; Maria Isabel Páramo; Ampara Gutiérrez; Ángela Vergara
- Editor: Carolina Silva
- Production company: Caracol Televisión

Original release
- Network: Netflix
- Release: 15 February 2023 – 18 March 2026

Eva Lasting (Spanish: La primera vez, lit. 'The First Time') is a Colombian romantic drama television series created by Dago García. It is produced by Caracol Televisión for Netflix. The series stars Emmanuel Restrepo and Francisca Estévez. The first season was released in 2023, while the succeeding seasons were released until the fourth and final season in 2026.

== Premise ==
Set from 1976 to 1985, in Bogotá, Colombia, complete with disco fashion, vehicles, and the city's first bowling alley, Eva Lasting revolves around Eva Samper who is the first girl ever to attend an all-boys high school as a pioneer of co-ed public schooling in the city. She befriends Camilo Granados in particular and a group of awkward friends. Eva is far more knowledgeable about relationships, literature and world affairs than the gang, taking advantage of and having fun with their naïvety. Seasons three onward focus on the characters and their experiences in college and the military.

== Cast ==
=== Main ===
- Emmanuel Restrepo as Camilo Granados
- Francisca Estévez as Eva Samper, the first girl to attend Colegio Distrital José María Root. Eva was brought up by her father and was expelled from her previous school.
- Santiago Alarcón as José Granados, Camilo's father who wants him to conform to the male machismo norms of the day. Alarcón also plays a fictionalized version of Friedrich Nietzsche, a recurring character who converses with Camilo in season 4.
- Verónica Orozco as Ana Larrarte de Granados
- Sergio Palau as Martin Salcedo
- Brandon Figueredo as Álvaro Castro
- Mateo García as Rodrigo Arbeláez
- Julián Cerati as Gustavo Pabón Linares (season 1, 3-4; recurring season 2)
- Sara Pinzón as Luisa Salcedo (season 2-4; recurring season 1)

=== Recurring ===
- Cecilia Navia as Professor Estela
- Santiago Heins as Edgar Acuña
- Billy Heins as William Acuña
- John Alex Toro as Henry Pabón
- Mónica Giraldo as Adela
- Angelo Valotta as Quiñones
- Catherine Mira as Brigitte
- Cristian Duque as Milton Guzmán
- Ella Becerra as Sara
- Fernando Lara as Miguel Chacón
- Diana Belmonte as Lucrecia Linares de Pabón
- John Álex Toro as Henry Pabón
- Adriana Arango as Dr. Alicia López
- Pedro Suárez as Professor Tello
- Andrés Castiblanco as Romero
- Milton Lopezarrubla as Father Angarita
- María Cecilia Botero as Lucy
- Juan Pablo Acosta as Professor Adolfo
- Cesar Álvarez as Professor Luismi
- María de los Ángeles Toro as Mrs. Arbeláez
- Víctor Hugo Morant as Toño
- Carla Giraldo as Piluca
- Junior González as Emiliano
- Alisson Joan as Natalia
- Alejandro Santamaria as Alfredo
- Judith Seguro as Rosario Cadena
- Juliana Garciá as Janet
- Valentina Duque as Vandalia
- Juliana Velásquez as Olga
- Jose Baek as Roberto

== Episodes ==
Each episode is named after a literary work or identifiable characters from different books.

Season	Episodes	Originally released
1	13	15 February 2023
2	10	10 July 2024
3	10	4 June 2025
4	12	18 March 2026

=== Season 1 (2023) ===
No. overall	No. in season	Title	Original release date
1	1	"Lysistrata" "Lisístrata"	15 February 2023
In 1976, 17-year old Eva Samper, becomes the first female student to attend Jose Maria Root, an all-boys high school in Bogotá. She is a pioneer of co-ed public schooling in the city. She is assigned to Class 10B and befriends Camilo Granados in particular and his awkward group of friends: Martin Salcedo, Alvaro Castro, Rodrigo Arbelaez and Gustavo Pabón. She is far more knowledgeable about relationships, literature and world affairs, taking advantage of and having fun with their naivety. The gang of boys congregate frequently at 68, a pool hall, to discuss this new development. Meanwhile, Camilo is taken to a brothel by his macho father, José, impressed by his interest in women, but fails to follow through because of his growing feelings for Eva.
2	2	"The Lady of the Camellias" "La dama de las camelias"	15 February 2023
Eva's presence raises jealousies, with Camilo confessing to his mother that he has feelings for her. The gang decide to investigate her background. In a farcical scene they erroneously decide she must be a prostitute, get taken to her alleged house by her 'driver' allegedly her 'father', where she tricks them into stripping naked before photographing them. She diffuses their embarrassment by taking them to Bogotá's first bowling alley, adding to the mystery by revealing her bowling skills. She says she may be leaving the school, which is a recurring theme across several episodes. Some of the gang visit a whorehouse.
3	3	"A Portrait of the Artist as a Young Man" "Retrato del artista adolescente"	15 February 2023
Camilo begins to read more books recommended by Eva, and A Portrait of the Artist as a Young Man, which has father finds suspicious given Camilo's lack of interest in literature. But Eva is introduced to Camilo's parents, who are impressed. The gang decide to sing a song in English at a parent-teacher event for Mother's Day, coached by Eva, who strangely speaks good English. But reverting to Spanish for the performance on stage it becomes clear that Martin, who seemed to show a gift as a composer, had simply copied a song he heard on the radio, and jealousies erupt. The gang starts fighting in front of a packed hall and the parents start insulting each other too across the floor. In the heat of the moment Martin's mother, Adela, reveals that Henry, Gustavo’s father, is having an affair with Estela, 10B’s homeroom teacher. This leads to her dismissal from the school, but Eva (taking a feminist stance) and Camilo believe she is innocent.
4	4	"A Room of One's Own" "Una habitación propia"	15 February 2023
Eva and Camilo hatch a risky plan to start a school newspaper, in which they will expose Henry for his womanising and taking advantage of Estela. They print the information via a contact of Eva's, but both get suspended from school. Gustavo is devastated by what was printed. Eva reveals a little more of herself to Camilo, including that her mother died by suicide and that as a lonely child with an absent father, she turned to literature. It is revealed that Estela shot and injured Henry in a crime of passion, resulting in Estela’s imprisonment.
5	5	"The Scarlet Letter" "La letra escarlata"	15 February 2023
Eva and Camilo investigate the case of Estela and Henry further, finding that the latter has a dubious and violent past and Estela probably shot him in self-defence. Others are unconvinced. Gustavo confirms he had been violent towards the family. They confront Henry in hospital and faced with their knowledge of his violence and illegal activities, he agrees to drop the case against Estela, who is released from prison and leaves Bogota. Eva and Camilo's school suspension is reversed. With that saga over, Eva is suddenly kidnapped by two gunmen, and is driven off at speed. Camilo, who was in the hijacked taxi with her, is devastated and anxious.
6	6	"Siddhartha" "Siddharta"	15 February 2023
Camilo and his father José rush to the police station to report Eva's kidnapping, but an aggressive and opinionated José loses his temper with police indifference, and ends up spending 24 hours in jail himself. Meanwhile Eva shows up at Camilo's house, lying that the kidnappers had got the wrong person. At school Eva's poor grades threaten her future, so she stops sitting with Camilo and moves to Guzmán's desk (someone much disliked and bullied by the gang), also studying with him and falling for him in the process. The gang is incredulous, and jealous.
7	7	"Tess of the d'Urbervilles" "Tess d'Urbervilles"	15 February 2023
Eva is dumped by Guzmán, who was using her to study for his own benefit, and he leaves the school on a scholarship to Germany. Eva is devastated, and gets drunk at 68. Many of the mysteries of Eva's life are revealed. The boys shadow her movements and discover her real home, a large Bogotá mansion, where she reveals her father is actually a rich industrialist, not the driver of one. She was using her driver's home, where the boys had been invited in previous episodes, as a decoy. The kidnap attempt was a real one given the wealth of the family, but the police had been trailing the assailants for weeks, so quickly arrested them. But her mother did indeed commit suicide and Eva had been expelled from several schools: if she did not do well with this, her last chance in a public school, she would have been sent to a Catholic religious boarding school run by nuns, in France. Martin's sister Luisa becomes the second girl at the school, unsettling friendship and gender dynamics (and annoying Martin since she is placed in the same class).
8	8	"The Sorrows of Young Werther" "Las penas de amor del joven Werther"	15 February 2023
The friends see Fellini's Casanova at the cinema, on Eva's suggestion, provoking more jealousies. Camilo's simmering love for Eva is going nowhere. He flirts with Luisa and writes her letters, but Eva, his real target, does not seem jealous. There is growing unrest in the city, with rising inflation and street protests resulting from the beginnings of neoliberalism and attacks on unions, in which Camilo's father is implicated as an organiser. Martial law is declared. The boys are forced to ask Eva for loans to help their households, as the only rich person they know. The loans were not forthcoming, and the issue adds to conflict. Eva engineers some time for Camilo to see Luisa away from her protective brother, not knowing that Camilo is not really interested in Luisa. Nietzsche's writings prove incomprehensible to the students in English class who must write an essential essay on his work.
9	9	"Thus Spoke Zarathustra" "Así habló Zaratustra"	15 February 2023
Camilo, confused, accidentally expresses his love for Luisa, taking advantage of her in Eva's house. Martin arrives and strongly suspects Camilo is there. Camilo, realising his efforts to make Eva jealous have failed, tries to back out of the relationship with Luisa. Eva thinks he is a coward, and cruel, making his situation worse in several awkward scenes, anchored by Martin's furious protection of his sister.
10	10	"The Teachings of Don Juan" "Las enseñanzas de Don Juan"	15 February 2023
Eva saves Camilo from Martin's anger, but tragically, Luisa is shipped off to Popayan by her mother to attend a Catholic boarding school. After a fragile order is restored, Eva holds a party, and girls from her previous schools come, with whom the gang are initially awkward. Álvaro gets drunk and causes a scene, the girls leave, and Eva rolls marijuana joints for the gang. Camilo confesses his love for Eva, but she breaks off to take a call that distresses her. On leaving, Camilo is shocked to see Gustavo giving Martin a blowjob. This, accidentally revealed, combined with the situation between Eva and Camilo, creates huge awkwardness back at school.
11	11	"De Profundis" "De profundis"	15 February 2023
Camilo has to report to the school authorities what he saw at Eva's party, since Quiñones exposed the incident to the whole school. He lies, saving Martin but 'burying' Gustavo, accusing him of sexual harassment or worse. Gustavo is suspended. Eva reads a fragment of Wilde's De profundis to class and also defends Gustavo. A parent meeting is called with the school principal, Dr. Alicia at which Ana, Camilo's mother, speaks up in Gustavo's defence, and for respect and tolerance, causing a family rift with 'backward' José. The school meeting results in Gustavo being sent for counselling rather than expelled. Camilo can't handle his guilt, makes up with his father, and tells the truth about the sexual encounter he witnessed, but Gustavo and his mother leave the school and Bogota, but not before Gustavo makes peace with Martin.
12	12	"The Asphalt Jungle" "Jungla de asfalto"	15 February 2023
Eva catches the Acuña twins trying to steal expensive items from her house and sell them on the black market. Rather than calling the police, she enlists them to assist herself and Camilo to steal the grade list from Dr. Alicia's office, to alter any failing grades for everybody. There are repercussions the next day, but overshadowed by Eva reciprocating Camilo's kiss. He is then confined to his room by his parents for admitting the theft of grades. Meanwhile Eva's father is arrested in Spain for money laundering, and jailed in Colombia, just as Colombia's marijuana trade begins to make international news. Camilo finds Eva hiding at her driver's after encountering the drug squad at her real house. They return to school and later visit her father in jail, which does not go well. Eva also has to go and live with her aunt in the US, since she is not yet 18 and her father is in jail.
13	13	"The Catcher in the Rye" "El guardián entre el centeno"	15 February 2023
Rather than endure separation, Eva and Camilo run away together, taking a bus to a family house of hers by the Neusa Reservoir. Things go well between them, and Eva also rids herself of a gun. But the couple are discovered by the police and flee, cycling back to Bogotá at night. Eva hides at Rodrigo's house, then at Alvaro and Martin's houses, but Adela turns her in to the police. Camilo's parents consider divorce given their manifest differences, but Camilo returns to them and they help him lie to the police that he does not know where Eva is. Meanwhile he convinces his parents to use a legal statute he found in the school library to take in a minor who is in family distress and who lacks relatives. However, the adoption fails because Eva's father is not in favor, and Eva is flown to the US. Eva sends a devastated Camilo Cien Sonetos de Amor by Pablo Neruda, with a photo of herself. The gang agree to try and find the money for Camilo to fly to the US. However, Camilo's plans are interrupted when he receives a phone call from Luisa, saying that she is pregnant with his child.

=== Season 2 (2024) ===
No. overall	No. in season	Title	Original release date
14	1	"Letters to a Young Poet" "Cartas a un joven poeta"	10 July 2024
Eva suddenly reappears at Camilo's doorstep while he is dealing with the aftermath of Luisa's pregnancy, but breaks up with Camilo after he tells what happened. Luisa returns to Bogota and hides at Eva’s house. Eva opposes Luisa engaging in a shotgun marriage with Camilo, saying that love should only be the basis for it. She also suggests an abortion for Luisa if she is not ready for motherhood. Camilo expresses his support for Luisa, who ultimately decides to abort. Eva and Camilo seek help from Rodrigo, who tells them that Quiñones' uncle operates an underground abortion clinic. Martin and Alvaro suspect their friends of hiding a secret.
15	2	"The Second Sex" "El segundo sexo"	10 July 2024
Eva, Camilo and Rodrigo accompany Luisa to the abortion clinic, but Luisa changes her mind at the last moment and flees with her companions. In revenge, Quiñones squeals her pregnancy to Martin, leading him to assault Camilo at 68 and get themselves jailed. As both Martin and Camilo's parents find out what happened, Jose and Adela insist on a shotgun marriage for the children, but Camilo and Ana vehemently oppose it and insist that they should continue their studies. Jose admonishes Ana, but the latter, fed up with his sexist attitudes, evicts him from their house, forcing him to move in with his mother, Lucy. Luisa is also sent to live with the Granadoses. Eva and Camilo accompany Luisa to Jose Maria, but Luisa is prevented from reenrolling due to regulations. After Eva reads a passage from the The Second Sex, Martin realizes he has been too harsh on his sister.
16	3	"Letters to a Child Never Born" "Cartas a un niño que nunca nació"	10 July 2024
Eva instigates a student strike to force Luisa's return to Jose Maria, while Martin visits Luisa and reconciles with her and later with Camilo. Dr. Alicia holds a parent-teacher meeting in which Jose convinces the body to vote against Luisa's admission, at the cost of further damaging his relationship with Ana and seeing her become closer with the philosophy teacher, Adolfo. Eva uses her contacts in the newspaper sector to publish an article by Camilo to highlight Luisa's predicament, resulting in authorities allowing her readmission and giving Camilo a job to sustain Luisa. After Adolfo tells Eva that Alicia actually has feminist sympathies, Eva asks her why she blocked Luisa’s return, to which Alicia tells her that maternity is a serious responsibility that should be recognized as an occupation. As the school year ends, Eva convinces her friends to take a vacation to Cartagena under the guise of accompanying Camilo on his way to cover a boxing match by Kid Pambele in Puerto Rico for the newspaper.
17	4	"Gulliver's Travels" "Los viajes de Gulliver"	10 July 2024
Eva and the group make stopovers in Melgar and Bucaramanga on their way to Cartagena. In Melgar, they hitchhike with Antonio, a truck driver transporting produce, help him load the contents and rush him to hospital when he suffers a heart attack while driving. In gratitude, he gives them his life savings before succumbing to his illness. Luisa tells Camilo she will not stand in the way of his romance with Eva. In Bucaramanga, Eva tracks down Gustavo, who is joyfully reunited with his friends. Gustavo’s girlfriend, Natalia, treats Eva badly, with Gustavo later confessing that he hid his homosexuality and framed Eva as his ex-girlfriend. Eva urges him to come clean with Natalia, resulting in them breaking up. A dejected Gustavo joins his friends on their way to Cartagena. Luisa and Rodrigo become closer to each other.
18	5	"When God Was a Woman" "Cuando Dios era mujer"	10 July 2024
In Cartagena, Eva introduces her friends to the sea for the first time. Alvaro overindulges in the sun, resulting in him suffering a severe case of sunburn. Eva rents a friend’s house, but Camilo becomes suspicious after seeing pictures of Eva with one of her ex-boyfriends. After Eva rebuffs Camilo’s attempts to restart their relationship, Camilo goes on a drunk night out with Gustavo and misses his flight to Puerto Rico, to the disappointment of his friends and boss at the newspaper. After a concerned Gustavo shares Camilo’s worries to Eva, the latter helps Camilo finish his writeup about Pambele’s loss, which Camilo watches on television. Months later, Eva is invited to spend Christmas with the Granadoses. She then convinces her friends to do a secret Santa. Luisa picks Eva, but exchanges her entry with Camilo and gets Rodrigo instead. With the help of his aunt, Jose and Rodrigo, Camilo imports a copy of When God Was a Woman direct from the United States and gives it to a happy Eva.
19	6	"The Sexual Revolution" "La revolución sexual"	10 July 2024
After the events involving Luisa, Dr. Alicia introduces a new sex education subject for the new school year under a euphemistic title, but Eva stages another revolt when the subject teacher is revealed to be the ultraconservative Professor Tello. Camilo convinces the newspaper editor to renew his contract despite the fiasco with Kid Pambele. Caught up in his job and his studies, Camilo inadvertently neglects Luisa, leading her to grow closer with Rodrigo, who discreetly accompanies her to a pregnancy-related medical checkup. Ana applies to become a secretary for Dr. Alicia, after the latter suffers a nervous breakdown over her handling of Eva.
20	7	"Doña Flor and Her Two Husbands" "Doña flor y sus dos maridos"	10 July 2024
Eva introduces her ex-boyfriend, Alfredo, a friendly and sophisticated youth who arouses the group's fascination for his lifestyle and takes them to the hangouts of the rich. However, Alfredo politely warns Camilo that he intends to win Eva back before returning to the United States. After negotiations with Dr. Alicia, Eva succeeds to have Tello replaced as sex education teacher with Rosario, a psychologist who turns out to be Jose's old flame and Ana's former rival for his affection. After Camilo notices Luisa's absence, the latter confesses her feelings for Rodrigo. Camilo later congratulates Rodrigo for taking care of Luisa and supports them becoming a romantic couple.
21	8	"LIVEFOREVER" "¡Que viva la música!"	10 July 2024
A jealous Jose is arrested for assaulting Adolfo, who becomes friends with Ana. Eva convinces Camilo and Alfredo to head for the woods and take hallucinogenic mushrooms, resulting in them experiencing a psychedelic episode. Eva has visions of an infant on a stroller surrounded by a snake, leading her to confess to Camilo that she had undergone an abortion after being impregnated by an unaware Alfredo. Eva later confesses to Alfredo, but the later abruptly dumps her in disbelief. Rosario convinces Adolfo not to press charges against Jose and secures his release before accompanying him to Lucy's house, where she reveals that he fathered her daughter, whom she raised as a single parent. Camilo, Ana and Lucy arrive and learn about Jose's other child, but to Jose's horror, Lucy then reveals herself to be a lesbian and introduces her girlfriend, Lucero.
22	9	"The Origin of the Family, Private Property and the State" "El orígen de la familia, la propiedad privada y el estado"	10 July 2024
Shaken at learning that he has an older sister, Camilo unwinds to his friends at 68. Jose moves in with a colleague and is joined by a sympathetic Camilo, who strains his relationship with Eva by espousing patriarchal ideas at Rosario's class. After a heated debate on the merits of the nuclear family, a guilt-stricken Camilo reconciles with Eva, who tells him to set things straight with his family. Eva accompanies Camilo in going to Rosario's house to see his sister Janet, a sweet-natured girl with Down syndrome whom Rosario home-schooled. Fed up with his son's bigotry, Lucy also takes Jose to meet Janet, but Jose drives off in confusion after seeing his daughter for the first time. Alvaro gets involved in a robbery with the Acuña twins and gets expelled despite Eva's protests to Dr. Alicia.
23	10	"Crime and Punishment" "Crímen y castigo"	10 July 2024
Jose overcomes his guilt at fleeing from Janet and takes her out to his house, where they bond over Janet's make-up skills. Gustavo returns to Jose Maria and rejoins his friends. Eva runs against Quiñones for a position in the student council in a bid to reverse Alvaro's and the Acuñas' expulsion. She campaigns on principled ideas but ultimately loses out to Quiñones' smear tactics. Luisa goes into labor at school and is rushed to hospital by her friends. At the hospital, Jose apologizes for assaulting Adolfo, who tells him Ana merely wants to be friends. As Luisa gives birth, Camilo, Eva and Martin take turns holding the newborn infant, who is named Antonia.

=== Season 3 (2025) ===
No. overall	No. in season	Title	Original release date
24	1	"Jane Eyre"	4 June 2025
25	2	"A Streetcar named Desire" "Un tranvía llamado Deseo"	4 June 2025
26	3	"On Photography" "Sobre la fotografía"	4 June 2025
27	4	"The Incredible and Sad Tale of Innocent Eréndira and Her Heartless Grandmother" "La increíble y triste historia de la cándida Eréndira y de su abuela desalmada"	4 June 2025
28	5	"Lord of the Flies" "El señor de las moscas"	4 June 2025
29	6	"The Kama Sutra" "El Kama-sutra"	4 June 2025
30	7	"Lolita"	4 June 2025
31	8	"Siempre"	4 June 2025
32	9	"The Diary of Anne Frank" "El diario de Ana Frank"	4 June 2025
Martin and Luisa's father, Pascual, shows up at 364 after a prolonged absence, claiming to have overcome his alcohol addiction. Eva goes into hiding at 364 after being tailed by police over his association with Professor Silva, who in turn is revealed to be involved with an urban guerrilla movement. The group realizes that 364 is under police surveillance and arrange for Eva to escape during a costume party. Quiñones infiltrates 364 and discovers Eva but leaves her alone, only for Pascual to betray Eva after she rejects his demands for money. Eva's father arranges for her release, after which Eva reveals Pascual's blackmail to Camilo. Upon learning of this, Luisa confronts her father, but finds that he continues to be a drunkard. Luisa blackmails him into leaving their life in exchange for her not revealing the truth to Martin, fearing that Pascual's behavior would push back Martin's efforts to move past his drug addiction. An angry Eva finally breaks up with Silva over the phone for endangering her and moves back in to 364, to Camilo's relief.
33	10	"The Plague" "La peste"	4 June 2025
Alvaro suffers a gruesome injury while playing football, ending his career as an athlete. He sulks in despair in his room until Martin intervenes and sends in Vandalia, who lifts Alvaro's spirits by having sex with him. Jose reconciles with Lucy before her departure with Lucero to the US. Ana allows Jose to move back with her on condition that he respects her independence. Quiñones reveals himself as gay to Gustavo, but the latter rebuffs his advances and demands his respect. Gustavo voluntarily leaves the army, during which Quiñones expresses his dignified regards. Luisa and Rodrigo resolve to hold their wedding at 364 in an improvised animist-themed ceremony officiated by Adolfo. Eva reveals to Camilo that Alfredo is asking her to come to the US after he fell into depression and attempted suicide after learning of her abortion. Camilo helps Eva make a video message to Alfredo rejecting his request and asking him instead to seek proper help. Camilo and Eva make their romantic relationship official. A satisfied Camilo finally publishes his autobiographical novel inspired by Eva, titled The First Woman.

=== Season 4 (2026) ===
No. overall	No. in season	Title	Original release date
34	1	"The First Woman" "La primera mujer"	18 March 2026
Camilo's autobiographical novel nearly causes a falling out over his depictions of his friends, except for Eva and Gustavo, who is sympathetic because of his running a theater company. Eva resorts to taking the group to a showing of Amarcord by Federico Fellini. After the group expresses admiration of the film, Eva draws parallels with Camilo’s novel and makes them realize his sincere intentions in writing about them, leading to a reconciliation with Camilo. After Antonia nearly stumbles upon a debauched Martin and his cocaine stash, Luisa and Rodrigo move out of 364 to find a safer environment to raise their child. The group rents out Luisa's room to Vandalia, who turns the spot into her drug den and rejects Alvaro’s advances while at the same time flirting with Eva.
35	2	"Feminist Ideology" "Ideario feminista"	18 March 2026
Eva goes to the Dominican Embassy to do research on Abigail Mejia, only to find herself among several captives in a month-long hostage crisis staged by M-19. A desperate Camilo volunteers to cover the drama for his newspaper, enabling him to contact Eva inside the embassy. Camilo and his friends organize a mass rally demanding the release of the hostages, with positive results.
36	3	"Troubles and Other Poems" "Vainas y otros poemas"	18 March 2026
Camilo and Eva begin living together in one room at 364. While Vandalia is away, the group destroys her cocaine stash during a police raid to avoid arrest. Fed up with Vandalia's recklessness, the group evicts her from 364, but only after she forces them to pay compensation for the cocaine and warning Eva that her relationship with Camilo is fleeting. After Janet is turned down for acting school due to her Down's Syndrome, Rosario tries to start a school catering to other similar individuals, to no avail. Camilo and Eva decide to move out of 364.
37	4	"Miss Julie" "La señorita Julia"	18 March 2026
Camilo and Eva argue on finding a new apartment, but Eva’s father cuts her off financially for living unmarried with Camilo. Camilo is angered when Martin and Alvaro accumulate unpaid bills at 364 and joins Eva in competing at a game show hoping to win the prize money and pay the bills. Camilo is visibly unsettled when Eva calls him as merely a friend in public. Eva deliberately loses the game when she realizes the bickering over the bills could tear the group apart. After Eva reveals this to Camilo, Camilo reveals his frustration at Eva’s actions, to which she explains she did not want to milk their relationship for publicity and reconciles with him. Lucy returns to Colombia after a falling out with her girlfriend and family in the US, only to get into an argument with Ana over her mounting overseas phone bills.
38	5	"Mexico and the Journey to the Land of the Tarahumaras" "México y el viaje al país de los Tarahumaras"	18 March 2026
After an argument on finances, Eva reconciles with Camilo after Luisa makes her realize that she has been spending way beyond her means. Lucy becomes the new tenant at 364. Janet and Rosario move to Spain in the hopes of finding better opportunities, to Jose's grief. Eva joins Gustavo on a trip to Cauca to partake in an shamanistic ritual involving hallucinogens. A conservative Lucy expresses reservations to Gustavo over the trip, but ultimately helps raise funds for their journey after Gustavo makes analogies with the Holy Mass.
39	6	"The Theatre and Its Double" "El teatro y su doble"	18 March 2026
In Cauca, Gustavo confronts his abusive father and finds inspiration at the shamanistic ritual, while Eva has an encounter with her long-dead mother. Jose bonds with Camilo when the latter asks for help in finding an elusive wrestler for a school assignment.
40	7	"For a Critique of the Political Economy of the Sign" "Crítica de la economía política del signo"	18 March 2026
Eva takes on a job as a car saleswoman but is found to be pregnant after collapsing on duty. She reveals her pregnancy to Camilo. The couple obtain a car and a dog to prepare for motherhood. When the dog disappears while being taken out on a walk by Eva, Camilo chastizes her, prompting her to drive off. Eva is involved in a car crash and miscarries. She is rallied back to health by Camilo, his parents, her friends, and Dr. Alicia, but continues to grieve for her unborn child. Estela shows up at 364.
41	8	"Delta of Venus" "Delta de Venus"	18 March 2026
Eva tries to help Estela's collection of erotic poetry get published, but to no avail as even Camilo criticizes her work. Estela leaves 364, but not before helping a curious Lucy try smoking marijuana. After appearing stoned in front of Jose, Lucy reconciles with Ana and returns to the US, to Jose’s grief. Meanwhile, Eva decides to become a literary translator. After Camilo's draft second novel is rejected, he moves into script-writing for television shows, to the consternation of a snobbish Eva.
42	9	"Six Characters in Search of an Author" "Seis personajes en busca de un autor"	18 March 2026
Gustavo falls in love with Hugo, a journalist. Alvaro is fired from his job as an assistant football coach because of his anger issues. He then becomes involved in a robbery with the Acuña twins and conceals his arrest from the group. After an argument with Luisa over finances, Rodrigo spends a night out at the bar where Martin works as a DJ, but ends up rushing Martin to hospital after he suffers a cocaine overdose.
43	10	"The Bible" "La Biblia"	18 March 2026
Luisa and Jose comfort Martin in hospital, with the latter going to a church meeting on Jose's suggestion. Martin falls in love with a nun, Monica, while at the same time defending Gustavo and Hugo in front of Father Angarita when Hugo's ex-boyfriend dies from AIDS. Rodrigo and Luisa reconcile. Eva goes on a work trip to the US while Camilo successfully pitches his first TV script. Depressed at Eva's absence, Camilo starts a fling with the assistant director, Marcela, but is caught by Eva, who says she has fallen for Scott, her client in the US, and breaks up with Camilo.
44	11	"On Education" "Sobre la educación"	18 March 2026
Eva returns to Colombia after three years for Antonia's birthday. She is accompanied by Scott, leading a drunk and jealous Camilo to insult her. After a hangover, Camilo struggles to recall what he did and ultimately reconciles with Eva after an apology. Alvaro and Martin turn their lives around, with Alvaro becoming a football referee and Martin marrying Monica. Janet and Rosario return to Colombia. Rosario helps Ana on her proposal to revise the educational curriculum, while Janet becomes attracted to Oswald, a fellow Down Syndrome patient who works at a records store.
45	12	"The Rebellious One" "El atravesado"	18 March 2026
Rodrigo and Luisa are caught up in the Palace of Justice siege. Rodrigo is released, but Luisa disappears in military custody and is never seen again, sending everyone into mourning. Janet politely rejects Oswald's marriage proposal, saying she wants to do many other things first, but remains friends with him. Jose, Rosario and Dr. Alicia help Ana advance her proposed educational reforms before the government. Marcela realizes Camilo's heart remains with Eva and amicably breaks up with him. Rodrigo and Camilo resolve to raise Antonia together in Luisa's absence, with Antonia moving in with Camilo and Rodrigo staying at their apartment with Luisa awaiting her return. Eva rekindles her romance with Camilo and joins the group in accompanying Antonia to Jose Maria Root.

== Release ==
The series premiered on 15 February 2023.

On 24 February 2023, the series was renewed for a second season that premiered on 10 July 2024. On 30 July 2024, the series was renewed for a third season, which was released on June 4, 2025. On 31 July 2025, the series was renewed for a fourth and final season that premiered on 18 March 2026.

== Spin-off series ==
In June 2026, a spin-off series of Eva Lasting was announced, focusing on Martin Salcedo and titled Salcedo, Leather and Boogaloo. It premiered on 8 July 2026.
