= Verónica Orozco =

Colombian actress and singer (born 1979)

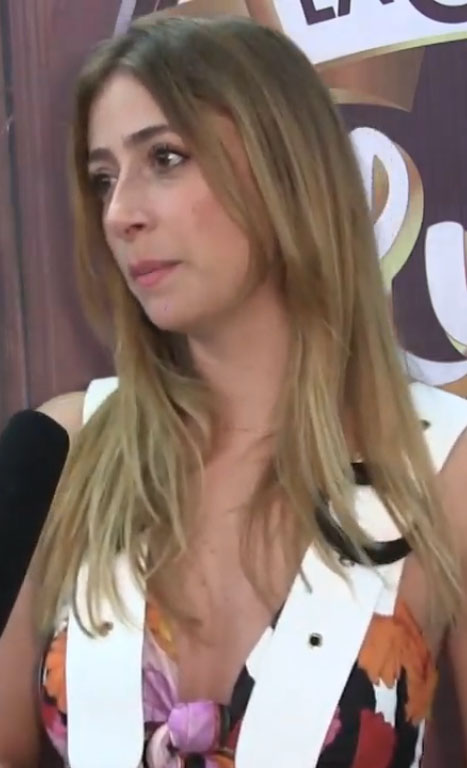
- Born: Verónica Orozco Aristizábal; June 8, 1979 (age 47); Bogotá, Colombia
- Occupations: Actress, singer
- Years active: 1992–present

Verónica Orozco Aristizábal (born June 8, 1979) is a Colombian actress and singer.

== Private life ==
Orozco is the daughter of actor Luís Fernando Orozco and Carmenza Aristizábal Hoyos. She has two sisters, actress Ana María and Juliana.

In January 2007, she married Colombian comedian Martín de Francisco in Villa de Leyva but the couple separated in April 2010 and divorced later the same year. The following year Orozco met psychologist Juan Sebastian Restrepo, and their daughter Violeta was born in 2012.

== Musical career ==
Orozco was a part of the Colombian TV musical show Okidoki, which led her to release three albums under the group name Okidoki in the early 1990s. In 2006 Orozco started her solo career, releasing the successful album Verónica Orozco. Her first single was "Las bragas", which had a lot of controversy around the lyrics suggesting lesbianism. Her second single was "Miénteme". It won an award for "Video del Año" (Video of the Year) at Los Premios Shock (Shock Awards). Her third single was "Descarada". She performed the song at Los Premios TV y Novelas and at one of the Nuestra Tierra 2007 concerts.

She also participated in the 2006 La Mega: Nuestra Tierra concerts, which showcased Colombian performers.

She later stated she would return to her music career and her second studio album was expected in mid-2009, but as of 2017 the only further release has been a one-off single "¿Dónde Está Mi Varón?" in 2016.

== Filmography ==
=== Films ===
Year	Title	Role	Notes
2001	Bogotá 2016	Cameo	Cameo in the segment "La venus virtual"
2006	A Ton of Luck	Dayana	
2006	Bluff	Rosmery, the death girl	
2012	Sanandresito	Fanny Correa	
2017	El Caso Watson	Ángela Rojas	
2018	El Reality	Constanza	

=== Television ===
Year	Title	Role	Notes
1992	Oki Doki	Vainilla	Supporting role
1994	Dejémonos de vainas	Daisy "LadiDi" Villegas	Supporting role
1996	Prisioneros del amor	Teresa	Supporting role
1998	La Madre	Lucía Suarez	Supporting role
1999	Francisco el Matemático	Magdalena Rivera	Supporting role
2000	Alicia en el País de las Mercancías	Alicia Cardona	Main role
2001	Isabel me la Veló	Isabel Vargas	Main role
2002-2003	La Lectora	Laura Cervantes	Main role
2004	Las Noches de Luciana	Katia Lopera	Supporting role
2007; 2011	Mujeres asesinas	Marta	Supporting role
2008-2009	Los Protegidos	Lina Santana	Main role
2010-2011	A Corazón Abierto	Dr. María Alejandra Rivas Cavalier	Main role
2015-2016	Anónima	Victoria Cuartas / Ángela Valera / Carolina Guerrero	Main role
2016	Bloque de búsqueda	Mónica María Barrera / Ana María Velandia de Gavilán	Main role
2017	Hermanos y hermanas	Catalina Soto	Main role
2019	La gloria de Lucho	Gloria Vargas	Main role
2019	Siempre bruja	Ninibé	Supporting role
2020	Verdad oculta	Colonel Diana Manrique	Main role
2022	A grito herido	Karla	Main role
2023–2026	Eva Lasting	Ana de Granados	Main role
2024	Arelys Henao: Aún queda mucho por cantar	Arelys Henao	Main role (season 2)
2025	Simplemente Alicia	Alicia Fernández	Main role
2026	Las de siempre	Lucía Durán	Main role

== Solo discography ==
=== Albums ===
==== Verónica Orozco ====
Verónica Orozco

Studio album by Verónica Orozco
- Released: 14 July 2006
- Recorded: 2005–06; Bogotá, Colombia, Buenos Aires, Argentina, New York City
- Genres: Latin pop, jazz pop
- Length: 38:33
- Label: Capitol
- Producers: Iván Benavides, Bernardo Ossa

Singles from Verónica Orozco
- 1. "Las Bragas" Released: July 1, 2006; 2. "Mienteme" Released: March 15, 2007; 3. "Descarada" Released: August 1, 2007

Verónica Orozco is the eponymous debut studio album by Orozco. It was released in Colombia on 14 July 2006 by EMI Music. Production for the album came primarily from Iván Benavides, alongside Bernardo Ossa. The album was certified gold in Orozco's home country.

Tracks:

All tracks are written by Verónica Orozco and Iván Benavides.

No.	Title	Length
1.	"Loca"	4:01
2.	"Cuchi, Cuchi"	3:55
3.	"Miénteme"	3:26
4.	"Las Bragas"	4:04
5.	"Perdóname"	4:05
6.	"Pienso en ti"	4:08
7.	"Descarada"	3:09
8.	"Pasion Asesina"	4:00
9.	"El Perfume"	3:53
10.	"Estar Contigo"	4:00

Personnel:

- Verónica Orozco – performer, lyricist, backing vocals
- Tom Coyne – mastering
- Iván Benavides – keyboard programming, sample programming, backing vocals
- Bernardo Ossa – producer
- Raul Higuera – photography

=== Singles ===
- "Las Bragas" (2006)
- "Miénteme" (2007)
- "Descarada" (2007)
- "¿Dónde Está Mi Varón?" (2016)
- "Mala" (2020)

Notes:

- Her song "Pasion Asesina" was included in the Colombian movie Soñar no Cuesta Nada (A Ton of Luck), in which she was featured, playing the role of the stripper Dayana.
- Her song "Las Bragas" was featured on the soundtrack for the Mexican TV show S.O.S.: Sexo y otros Secretos.
