= Arelys Henao (TV series) =

Colombian telenovela

- Also known as: Arelys Henao: Canto para no llorar (season 1); Arelys Henao: Aún queda mucho por cantar (season 2)
- Genre: Telenovela
- Created by: Héctor Rodríguez Cúellar
- Written by: Mayra Alejandra Henao; Ángela Milena Ardila; Jhonny Ortiz; Gustavo Salcedo; Jörg Hiller; María Cecilia Boenheim; Adriana Barreto; Tatiana Andrade
- Directed by: Andrés Felipe López; Liliana Bocanegra; Camilo Andrés Villamizar
- Starring: Mariana Gómez; José Ramón Barreto; Verónica Orozco; Santiago Alarcón
- Composers: Diego Lukumy; Sebastián Luengas; Nicolas Uribe
- Country of origin: Colombia
- Original language: Spanish
- No. of seasons: 2
- No. of episodes: 129

Production
- Executive producer: Manuel Peñaloza
- Editor: José Luis Oróstegui
- Production company: Caracol Televisión

Original release
- Network: Caracol Televisión
- Release: 11 January 2022 – 15 April 2024

Arelys Henao (English title: The Unbroken Voice) is a Colombian telenovela that premiered on Caracol Televisión on 11 January 2022. The series is based on the life of Colombian singer Arelys Henao. Mariana Gómez stars as Henao in the first season, while Verónica Orozco portrays the singer in the second season.

On 24 April 2023, it was officially announced that the series was renewed for a second season, that premiered on 9 January 2024.

== Cast ==
=== Main ===
- Mariana Gómez as Luz Arelys Henao Ruiz (season 1)
- José Ramón Barreto as Wilfredo Hurtado (season 1)
- Yuri Vargas as Yasmín Solano (season 1)
- Juan Sebastián Calero as Alonso Henao (season 1)
- Luis Eduardo Motoa as Tano Henao
- Victoria Ortiz as Clara Inés Ríos
- Ana María Pérez as María Ruiz de Henao (season 1)
- Sebastián Giraldo as Fernando "Nando" Henao Ruiz
- Daniel Mira as Martín Henao Ruiz
- Jim Muñoz as Fabián Viscaino (season 1)
- Carmenza Cossio as Leda Perea
- Anderson Ballesteros as Óscar Vargas "Patoco"
- Verónica Orozco as Luz Arelys Henao Ruiz (season 2)
- Santiago Alarcón as Wilfredo Hurtado (season 2)
- Mateo Rincón as Juan Esteban Hurtado Henao (season 2)
- Brandon Figueredo as Miguel Hurtado Henao (season 2)
- Linda Lucía Callejas as María Ruiz de Henao (season 2)
- Catalina Polo as Salomé (season 2)
- Freddy Ordóñez as Benancio Urrego (season 2, recurring season 1)
- Jairo Ordóñez as Baltazar Urrego (season 2, recurring season 1)
- Tatiana Ariza as Yasmín Solano (season 2)
- Laura Taylor as Adelaida Henao Solano (season 2)

=== Recurring and guest ===
- María José Correa as Alba Henao Ruiz
- Luis Alberto Rojas
- Juanita Molina as Ángela
- Marcela Vanegas as Aurora Moreno
- Simón Savi as Samuel
- Natalia Lara
- Juan Camilo Pérez
- María Alejandra Duque as Gabriela
- Juan Pablo Acosta as Jairo
- Valentina Duque
- Luis Bernal
- Juan Vargas Millán as Matías
- Isabella Betancur as Nubia Henao Ruiz
- Mauricio Mejía as Uriel
- Tatiana Arango as Sofía
- Camila Taborda as Amanda
- Juan Sebastián Velandia
- Henry Montealegre as Lázaro Henao Ruiz
- Felipe Bernedette as Jerónimo

== Episodes ==
Series	Title	Episodes	Originally released	
Series	Title	Episodes	First released	Last released
1	Canto para no llorar	65	11 January 2022	13 April 2022
2	Aún queda mucho por cantar	64	9 January 2024	15 April 2024

=== Season 1: Canto para no llorar (2022) ===
No. overall	No. in season	Title	Original release date	Colombia viewers (Rating points)
1	1	"Arelys llega al pueblo junto a su familia y se inscribe en el colegio"	11 January 2022	12.7
2	2	"Arelys le pide ayuda a Samuel para enfrentar a Patoco"	12 January 2022	12.7
3	3	"Arelys canta para un grupo armado"	13 January 2022	13.5
4	4	"Samuel le cuenta a María que Arelys se quedó en el campamento"	14 January 2022	15.1
5	5	"Arelys es expulsada del colegio"	17 January 2022	13.8
6	6	"Patoco se roba a la bebé del hospital"	18 January 2022	13.8
7	7	"La presentación de Arelys es saboteada por su director"	19 January 2022	14.0
8	8	"Martín y Yazmín aceptan adoptar a Julia"	20 January 2022	12.9
9	9	"Sofía denuncia a su esposo ante la Policía"	21 January 2022	11.9
10	10	"Yazmín y Martín huyen del pueblo junto a la pequeña Julia"	24 January 2022	12.3
11	11	"Arelys se entera de que su padre está desaparecido"	25 January 2022	12.8
12	12	"Con gran dolor, Arelys le da el último adiós a Samuel"	26 January 2022	11.5
13	13	"Arelys y su familia llegan a la casa de tío Tano"	27 January 2022	11.2
14	14	"Fabián y Yazmín se casan por lo civil"	28 January 2022	12.1
15	15	"Arelys empieza a tener más problemas en la peluqueria"	31 January 2022	13.0
16	16	"Walter les informa a Ronald y Arelys que venderá la peluquería"	2 February 2022	13.3
17	17	"Un amor del pasado regresa a la vida de Wilfredo"	3 February 2022	13.1
18	18	"Margarita pone en riesgo la presentación de Arelys"	4 February 2022	12.4
19	19	"A la vida de Arelys llegó un nuevo enemigo que querrá aprovecharse de ella"	7 February 2022	12.5
20	20	"Arelys tiene que elegir entre su carrera y sus convicciones"	8 February 2022	13.4
21	21	"Arelys se reencuentra con su padre, quien le pide que se retire de la música"	9 February 2022	13.1
22	22	"Wilfredo le salva la vida a Arelys"	10 February 2022	13.5
23	23	"Shirley se vuelve una enemiga más de Arelys"	11 February 2022	12.8
24	24	"Sin temor a nada, Arelys le tiende una trampa al prestamista"	14 February 2022	13.6
25	25	"Wilfredo confiesa su interés por casarse con Arelys"	15 February 2022	13.2
26	26	"¡Sí rotundo! Arelys acepta la gran propuesta de Wilfredo"	16 February 2022	13.9
27	27	"Un concurso de belleza que trae muchas sorpresas detrás"	17 February 2022	13.8
28	28	"Arelys recibe una sorpresa mientras está en el reinado"	18 February 2022	13.8
29	29	"Gonzalo le ofrece dinero a Wilfredo para alejarse de la vida de Arelys"	21 February 2022	11.9
30	30	"El alcalde le confiesa a Arelys que, si no canta donde Gonzalo, lo van a matar"	22 February 2022	12.8
31	31	"Fernando llega a la casa de Tano luego de salir de la cárcel"	23 February 2022	13.6
32	32	"Arelys regresa a su hogar mientras los hermanos Urrego están en peligro"	24 February 2022	13.7
33	33	"Grandes pruebas exigirán decisiones complicadas"	25 February 2022	13.2
34	34	"Don Kiko se nombra a sí mismo padrino musical de Arelys"	28 February 2022	14.5
35	35	"María y sus hijos se van de la casa de Tano"	1 March 2022	14.0
36	36	"Arelys termina de grabar el disco, pero una oscura noticia se avecina"	2 March 2022	13.6
37	37	"Arelys escucha su voz en la radio, pero se lleva una gran sorpresa"	3 March 2022	14.1
38	38	"María prepara una reunión familiar para Lázaro"	4 March 2022	14.2
39	39	"Martín tendrá que luchar ante falsas acusaciones"	7 March 2022	13.7
40	40	"Wilfredo regresa del servicio militar y se encuentra varias sorpresas"	8 March 2022	13.2
41	41	"Arelys y Wilfredo tienen un momento muy romántico"	9 March 2022	12.2
42	42	"Se descubre si Martín es culpable o no del ataque a Clemencia"	10 March 2022	11.4
43	43	"Patoco tiene la vida de Wilfredo en sus manos"	11 March 2022	11.5
44	44	"Una carta sentencia a Arelys a irse para salvarle la vida a Wilfredo"	14 March 2022	11.5
45	45	"Cegado por su obsesión, Patoco obliga a Arelys a que le cante"	15 March 2022	12.9
46	46	"De la tristeza a la felicidad: Arelys vive un mar de emociones"	16 March 2022	12.7
47	47	"Llegó su momento: la carrera de Arelys coge vuelo"	17 March 2022	11.9
48	48	"Los hombres aprenderán a valorar a sus mujeres, ¿será muy tarde?"	18 March 2022	11.0
49	49	"Arelys se entera de que está esperando un bebé"	22 March 2022	12.1
50	50	"Doña Leda le cuenta a Arelys que van a detener a Wilfredo por deserción"	23 March 2022	12.8
51	51	"Acatando la orden de su padre, Arelys abandona su residencia"	24 March 2022	12.9
52	52	"Gran especial de Arelys Henao, canto para no llorar"	25 March 2022	9.3
53	53	"Clara Inés y Jerónimo buscan desesperadamente a Arelys en la ciudad"	28 March 2022	13.1
54	54	"Arelys visita a Alonso en el centro de salud"	29 March 2022	13.0
55	55	"Alonso presenta complicaciones y es sometido a una operación de emergencia"	30 March 2022	12.6
56	56	"Alonso es dado de alta en la clínica y regresa a su hogar"	31 March 2022	12.0
57	57	"Un antes y después en la vida de Arelys Henao"	1 April 2022	10.5
58	58	"Arelys va a su presentación en Sabanalarga pero algo la hace dudar"	4 April 2022	11.9
59	59	"Arelys abandona Sabanalarga por su seguridad, sin saber que Jerónimo fue asesinado"	5 April 2022	11.4
60	60	"Arelys firma contrato con una disquera, mientras ‘Patoco’ sigue haciendo el mal"	6 April 2022	11.8
61	61	"Continúa la búsqueda de la sobrina de Arelys hasta que sucede algo inesperado"	7 April 2022	12.5
62	62	"Actores vs vida real: los personajes esenciales en la vida de Arelys Henao"	8 April 2022	9.1
63	63	"Arelys da a luz a Juan Esteban, mientras que su padre fallece inesperadamente"	11 April 2022	12.5
64	64	"Arelys entra en un dilema sobre su viaje a México"	12 April 2022	11.2
65	65	"En medio de una boda doble, Arelys se casa con Wilfredo"	13 April 2022	11.9

=== Season 2: Aún queda mucho por cantar (2024) ===
No. overall	No. in season	Title	Original release date	Colombia viewers (Rating points)
66	1	"Wilfredo es capturado en medio de un concierto de Arelys"	9 January 2024	7.1
67	2	"Arelys es obligada a cantar en el cumpleaños de Salomé"	10 January 2024	7.4
68	3	"Salomé busca ayuda de Arelys y El Sierra busca vengarse de la cantante"	11 January 2024	6.8
69	4	"Arelys toma la decisión de que Salomé viva con ellos"	12 January 2024	6.4
70	5	"La madre de Salomé llega para generar nuevos problemas"	15 January 2024	6.6
71	6	"Wilfredo es víctima de los planes de Salomé y Dorotea"	16 January 2024	6.6
72	7	"El Sierra vuelve a causar daño para recuperar su poder"	17 January 2024	6.7
73	8	"Wilfredo se mete en la boca del lobo para buscar a su hermano"	18 January 2024	6.6
74	9	"Salomé convence a Wilfredo de trabajar con el grupo de El Sierra"	19 January 2024	5.8
75	10	"Wilfredo se entera de una dolorosa noticia sobre su hermano"	22 January 2024	6.1
76	11	"Salomé firma su contrato con Henao Records"	23 January 2024	6.3
77	12	"Wilfredo va a la cárcel y se lleva una terrible sorpresa"	24 January 2024	6.2
78	13	"¿Wilfredo se gana otro enemigo en la cárcel?"	25 January 2024	6.7
79	14	"Arelys Henao firma los papeles del traspaso del bar y la casa"	26 January 2024	6.3
80	15	"Wilfredo es encontrado con el cuerpo de El Sierra e idea un plan para salvarse"	29 January 2024	6.6
81	16	"Wilfredo ejecuta un plan para fugarse de la cárcel, ¿logrará escapar?"	30 January 2024	6.3
82	17	"Arelys descubre que varios prisioneros se fugaron de la cárcel"	31 January 2024	6.6
83	18	"Wilfredo estará en problemas con la Fiscalía y otros prisioneros"	1 February 2024	6.6
84	19	"Wilfredo confiesa que ayudó a planear la fuga"	2 February 2024	5.9
85	20	"Tito se opone a que Arelys se presente en el festival"	5 February 2024	6.0
86	21	"Acusan a Arelys de robarse el dinero de la publicidad"	6 February 2024	6.8
87	22	"Arelys demuestra su inocencia frente a los oyentes"	7 February 2024	6.7
88	23	"Tano ve que Adelaida participa en el robo de su tienda"	8 February 2024	6.1
89	24	"Arelys descubre quién está detrás de la venta ilegal de su música"	9 February 2024	6.4
90	25	"El Rey ayuda a Arelys en medio del robo de sus instrumentos"	12 February 2024	6.4
91	26	"El chisme de la infidelidad de Arelys tiene consecuencias"	13 February 2024	6.4
92	27	"Leda no recuerda quién es y empieza a habitar en la calle"	14 February 2024	6.8
93	28	"Martín es acusado de intento de homicidio del juez Jaramillo"	15 February 2024	6.5
94	29	"Wilfredo cumple con la primera misión de Nando"	16 February 2024	5.5
95	30	"Wilfredo se gana la confianza de Nando y se infiltra en su grupo"	19 February 2024	5.6
96	31	"Martín Henao decide que se va a ir del país"	20 February 2024	6.1
97	32	"Juan Esteban y Miguel se reencuentran con Wilfredo en la cárcel"	21 February 2024	5.9
98	33	"Wilfredo recibe una golpiza y queda inconsciente"	22 February 2024	6.3
99	34	"Arelys pide cancelar el concierto para estar con Wilfredo"	23 February 2024	5.4
100	35	"Arelys se reencuentra con Salomé y Pancho, ¿le darán problemas?"	26 February 2024	7.0
101	36	"Wilfredo finalmente regresa a su casa con su familia"	27 February 2024	6.4
102	37	"Clara Inés insiste en que nadie sepa de la muerte de su bebé"	28 February 2024	7.0
103	38	"La esposa de Nando encuentra a Arelys gracias a Reinel"	29 February 2024	7.0
104	39	"Wilfredo culpa a Simón de que su familia corra peligro"	1 March 2024	6.1
105	40	"¿Yazmín descubre la verdadera identidad de Reinel?"	4 March 2024	6.8
106	41	"Clara Inés se entera que Reinel es un sicario"	5 March 2024	7.5
107	42	"Wilfredo amenaza a Nando con meter a Vicky a la cárcel"	6 March 2024	7.0
108	43	"Rosita muere y Vicky es capturada por la Policía"	7 March 2024	6.5
109	44	"Wilfredo vuelve a sufrir por una desgracia con su familia"	8 March 2024	6.0
110	45	"Wilfredo y Arelys vuelven a ilusionarse con la disquera"	11 March 2024	6.5
111	46	"Fernando se deja seducir con los encantos de Gloria"	12 March 2024	6.3
112	47	"Reinel sale de prisión y está ansioso por buscar a Clara Inés"	13 March 2024	6.4
113	48	"Reinel dispara y presiona a Arelys para saber de Clara Inés"	14 March 2024	6.2
114	49	"Pancho y Salomé causan problemas entre Simón y Arelys"	15 March 2024	6.0
115	50	"Reinel secuestra a Benancio y Zulma para asustar a Clara Inés"	18 March 2024	6.1
116	51	"Baltazar salva a Clara Inés de Reinel, pero resulta herido"	19 March 2024	6.9
117	52	"Pancho le arrebata a Arelys una banda que estaba en su disquera"	20 March 2024	6.6
118	53	"Salomé es amenazada, ¿se sabrá su rol en la muerte de Joaquín?"	21 March 2024	6.5
119	54	"Simón le cede su parte de la productora a Pancho"	1 April 2024	6.8
120	55	"Simón le confiesa a la artista que siempre la ha amado en secreto"	2 April 2024	7.1
121	56	"Arelys está a punto de perder su música, ¿lo descubrirá?"	3 April 2024	7.2
122	57	"Yazmín contempla irse del país con Simón"	4 April 2024	6.6
123	58	"Salomé le hace una propuesta a Adelaida que no puede rechazar"	5 April 2024	6.2
124	59	"Arelys Henao toma una decisión radical sobre la productora"	8 April 2024	6.7
125	60	"Arelys se entera de que perdió los derechos de sus canciones"	9 April 2024	6.4
126	61	"Martín descubre que tiene una grave enfermedad"	10 April 2024	6.3
127	62	"La familia se reúne para hacerle una propuesta a Martín"	11 April 2024	6.5
128	63	"Arelys pierde los derechos de sus canciones"	12 April 2024	6.5
129	64	"Arelys Henao recupera la productora y sus canciones"	15 April 2024	6.7

== Reception ==
=== Ratings ===
Season	Timeslot (COT)	Episodes	First aired		Last aired		Avg. viewers (in points)
Season	Timeslot (COT)	Episodes	Date	Viewers (in points)	Date	Viewers (in points)	Avg. viewers (in points)
1	Mon–Fri 9:30 p.m.	65	11 January 2022	12.7	13 April 2022	11.9	12.7
2	Mon–Fri 9:30 p.m.	64	9 January 2024	7.1	15 April 2024	6.7	6.5

=== Awards and nominations ===
Year	Award	Category	Nominated	Result	Ref
2022	Produ Awards	Best Superseries	Arelys Henao: Canto para no llorar	Nominated	
2022	Produ Awards	Best Lead Actress - Superseries or Telenovela	Mariana Gómez	Nominated	
2022	Produ Awards	Best Lead Actor - Superseries or Telenovela	José Ramón Barreto	Nominated	
2022	Produ Awards	Best Fiction Production - Superseries or Telenovela	Manuel Peñaloza	Nominated	
2023	India Catalina Awards	Best Fiction Series - Long Form	Arelys Henao: Canto para no llorar	Nominated	
2023	India Catalina Awards	Best Lead Actress	Mariana Gómez	Won	
2023	India Catalina Awards	Best Supporting Actress	Yuri Vargas	Nominated	
2023	India Catalina Awards	Best Directing	Arelys Henao: Canto para no llorar	Nominated	
2023	India Catalina Awards	Best Fiction Screenplay	Héctor Rodríguez	Nominated	
2023	India Catalina Awards	Best Editor	José Luis Oróstegui	Nominated	
2023	India Catalina Awards	Best Musical Director	Nicolás Uribe and Sebastián Luengas	Nominated	
2023	India Catalina Awards	Favorite Production of the Public	Arelys Henao: Canto para no llorar	Nominated	
2024	Produ Awards	Best Superseries	Arelys Henao	Nominated	
2024	Produ Awards	Best Lead Actress - Superseries	Verónica Orozco	Nominated	
2024	Produ Awards	Best Lead Actor - Superseries	Santiago Alarcón	Nominated	
