= Las Vega's =

Las Vega's may refer to:

- Las Vega's (Chilean TV series), 2013
- Las Vega's (Colombian TV series), 2016

== See also ==
- Las Vegas (disambiguation)
