= Chris Peckover =

Australian Canadian filmmaker

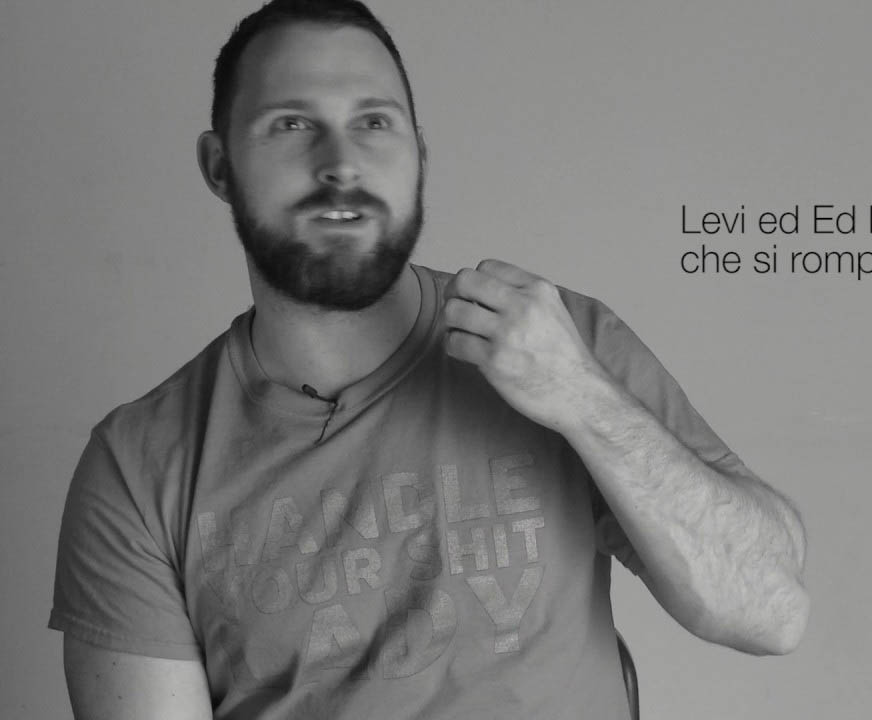
- Chris Peckover
- Born: 1981 or 1982; Montreal, Quebec
- Occupation(s): Film director, screenwriter

Chris Peckover (born 1981 or 1982) is an Australian Canadian filmmaker best known for the horror films Undocumented and Better Watch Out.

== Early life ==
Peckover was born in Montreal and holds dual citizenship in Canada and Australia as his mother is Australian. He was raised in Rockwall, Texas.

== Education ==
Peckover attended Yale University, where he initially intended to study psychology as a pre-med student before switching to a film studies major. He later graduated from the Peter Stark Producing Program at the University of Southern California.

== Career ==
A year after graduating from the University of Southern California, Peckover sold the script to his first feature film, Undocumented. The finished project was released in 2010.

Peckover's second feature, the holiday horror film Better Watch Out, was released in 2016.

== Personal life ==
Peckover identifies as queer.

== Filmography ==
Year	Title	Ref.
2010	Undocumented	
2016	Better Watch Out	

== Awards and nominations ==
Year	Award	Category	Nominated work	Result	Ref.
2016	Ithaca International Fantastic Film Festival	Audience Award for Best Film	Better Watch Out	Won	
2016	Ithaca International Fantastic Film Festival	Jury Award for Best Film	Better Watch Out	Won	
2017	Fantasia International Film Festival	Audience Award for Best European / North-South American Feature	Better Watch Out	Won	
2017	Brussels International Festival of Fantasy Film	Golden Raven	Better Watch Out	Won	
