= Las de siempre =

Colombian telenovela

- Genre: Telenovela
- Written by: Liliana Guzmán; Paola Arias; Rodrigo Holguín; Claudia Bautista; Angie López
- Directed by: Israel Sánchez; Catalina Hernández
- Starring: Verónica Orozco; Juliana Galvis; Viña Machado; Diana Wiswell
- Country of origin: Colombia
- Original language: Spanish
- No. of seasons: 1
- No. of episodes: 91

Production
- Executive producer: Ana María Pérez
- Producer: Carolina Vera
- Production company: RCN Televisión

Original release
- Network: Canal RCN
- Release: 13 January – 29 May 2026

Las de siempre is a Colombian telenovela created by Liliana Guzmán, Paola Arias and Rodrigo Holguín for RCN Televisión. It stars an ensemble cast headed by Verónica Orozco, Juliana Galvis, Viña Machado and Diana Wiswell. It aired on Canal RCN from 13 January 2026 to 29 May 2026.

== Plot ==
The telenovela tells the story of four friends who, after facing life-changing crises, decide to reinvent themselves and start over after turning 40. Lucía is a journalist who discovers that her marriage and career were always a sham. Mónica is a single mother who devoted herself entirely to caring for her deaf daughter Milagros, only to find her life meaningless when Milagros decides to study abroad. Silvia gave up her career as a lawyer for love, but discovers that not everything is as perfect as she thought, as her husband, Patricio, is a narcissistic and abusive man. Tania, Lucía's younger sister, has a youthful spirit and a carefree attitude towards life, until she faces pregnancy at 40.

== Cast ==
- Verónica Orozco as Lucía Durán
- Juliana Galvis as Silvia Buendía
- Viña Machado as Mónica Rojas
- Diana Wiswell as Tania Durán
- Rafael Novoa as Patricio Vivas
- Iván López as Duván Parra
- Carmenza Gómez as Karen Garzón
- George Slebi as Carlos Vegara
- Jair Romero as Fabián Celis
- Bárbara Perea as Doña Ceci
- Alisson Joan as Sara Forero
- Carolina Sabino as Xiomara Franco
- Carolina Acevedo as Clara Rodríguez
- Valerina Emiliani as Valeria Parra
- Elizabeth Chavarriaga as Lady Morpho
- Mafe Marín as Milagros Rojas

== Production ==
In May 2025, it was reported that Verónica Orozco would star in Las 40, alongside Viña Machado, Juliana Galvis, Diana Wiswell and Carolina Acevedo. Filming of the telenovela began on 3 July 2025. That same day, Las de siempre was announced as the official title of the telenovela.

== Ratings ==
Season	Timeslot (COT)	Episodes	First aired		Last aired		Avg. viewers (in points)
Season	Timeslot (COT)	Episodes	Date	Viewers (in points)	Date	Viewers (in points)	Avg. viewers (in points)
1	Mon–Fri 9:30 p.m.	91	13 January 2026	4.7	29 May 2026	4.5	3.7

== Episodes ==
No.	Title	Original release date	Colombia viewers (Rating points)
1	"Vida sin equilibrio"	13 January 2026	4.7
2	"Reprimiendo emociones"	14 January 2026	4.4
3	"Mundos paralelos"	15 January 2026	3.9
4	"La verdad, libera"	16 January 2026	3.7
5	"Cambio de vida"	19 January 2026	4.4
6	"Pasado enredado"	20 January 2026	3.5
7	"Los miedos de Mónica"	21 January 2026	3.4
8	"Paternidad en duda"	22 January 2026	3.7
9	"Mundo de mentiras"	23 January 2026	2.9
10	"Confesiones dolorosas"	26 January 2026	3.7
11	"Amistad en pedazos"	27 January 2026	3.8
12	"La voluntad de Patricio"	28 January 2026	4.0
13	"Rebuscando la vida"	29 January 2026	3.4
14	"Acuerdo amistoso"	30 January 2026	3.2
15	"Una ayuda conveniente"	2 February 2026	3.6
16	"Los sueños de Silvia"	3 February 2026	3.9
17	"Saliendo del nido"	4 February 2026	4.0
18	"Fuera de control"	5 February 2026	4.2
19	"Tocando fondo"	6 February 2026	3.3
20	"Cicatrices del pasado"	9 February 2026	4.2
21	"El secreto de Karen"	10 February 2026	3.6
22	"Destinados a encontrarse"	11 February 2026	4.0
23	"Sin miedo a equivocarse"	12 February 2026	3.4
24	"Cambiando el chip"	13 February 2026	3.2
25	"Despedida inesperada"	16 February 2026	3.7
26	"El dolor de Mónica"	17 February 2026	4.0
27	"Volver a sentir"	18 February 2026	4.1
28	"El fantasma del pasado"	19 February 2026	4.3
29	"Sueños pisoteados"	20 February 2026	4.5
30	"Recogiendo migajas"	23 February 2026	4.3
31	"El infiltrado de Lucía"	24 February 2026	3.6
32	"Lo mejor está por venir"	25 February 2026	4.0
33	"Ambición desproporcionada"	26 February 2026	4.1
34	"La vida en riesgo"	27 February 2026	4.0
35	"Promesa inquebrantable"	2 March 2026	4.3
36	"Mamá canguro"	3 March 2026	3.8
37	"Investigación en curso"	4 March 2026	3.7
38	"Dudas del poliamor"	5 March 2026	3.5
39	"Relaciones complicadas"	6 March 2026	N/A
40	"Sabotaje contra Silvia"	9 March 2026	4.1
41	"Maternidad abrumadora"	10 March 2026	3.7
42	"Un medio sin miedo"	11 March 2026	4.3
43	"Intenciones dudosas"	12 March 2026	3.1
44	"Poniendo en orden la vida"	13 March 2026	3.6
45	"Crisis de identidad"	16 March 2026	4.4
46	"Malentendido bochornoso"	17 March 2026	3.8
47	"Olvido imperdonable"	18 March 2026	4.1
48	"Enemigo silencioso"	19 March 2026	3.7
49	"Las prioridades de Lucía"	20 March 2026	3.9
50	"Las fichas de Patricio"	24 March 2026	3.3
51	"Paz para el alma"	25 March 2026	3.7
52	"La caída de un peón"	27 March 2026	3.5
53	"Duván en riesgo"	30 March 2026	4.2
54	"Acusaciones peligrosas"	31 March 2026	4.0
55	"Un compromiso inevitable"	1 April 2026	3.6
56	"Un pasado con heridas"	6 April 2026	3.4
57	"La salvación de Xiomara"	7 April 2026	3.3
58	"Corrupción oculta"	8 April 2026	3.6
59	"Confusos sentimientos"	9 April 2026	3.9
60	"Una vida que se apaga"	13 April 2026	4.4
61	"Culpa incesante"	15 April 2026	3.7
62	"Amor descontrolado"	16 April 2026	3.8
63	"Boda sin freno"	17 April 2026	3.5
64	"La confianza del amor"	20 April 2026	3.5
65	"¿Qúe pasa con los hombres?"	21 April 2026	4.0
66	"Cobrando traiciones"	22 April 2026	3.6
67	"Nuevo comienzo"	23 April 2026	3.1
68	"El karma de Patricio"	24 April 2026	3.0
69	"Cerrando ciclos"	27 April 2026	N/A
70	"Nuevas batallas"	28 April 2026	3.3
71	"Con el corazón en la mano"	29 April 2026	3.2
72	"Revelaciones dolorosas"	30 April 2026	2.8
73	"Viviendo el día"	4 May 2026	3.0
74	"Tiempo de cambios"	5 May 2026	3.4
75	"Sueños desvanecidos"	6 May 2026	3.3
76	"En busca del reposo"	7 May 2026	3.2
77	"La paz de Karen"	8 May 2026	3.5
78	"Premio influenciado"	11 May 2026	3.3
79	"La verdad de Víctor"	12 May 2026	3.3
80	"El secreto"	13 May 2026	3.0
81	"Cadena de perdón"	14 May 2026	3.7
82	"El destino de Tania"	15 May 2026	3.3
83	"Camila pierde el control"	19 May 2026	N/A
84	"Una inesperada propuesta"	20 May 2026	3.8
85	"Amor propio"	21 May 2026	4.0
86	"Embarazo sorpresa"	22 May 2026	N/A
87	"El llamado"	25 May 2026	N/A
88	"Despedida con amor"	26 May 2026	3.7
89	"El sospechoso Patricio"	27 May 2026	4.0
90	"El karma"	28 May 2026	4.0
91	"Justicia y amor"	29 May 2026	4.5
