= Hermanos y hermanas =

Colombian telenovela

- Genre: Telenovela
- Based on: Brothers & Sisters by Jon Robin Baitz
- Directed by: Sergio Osorio; Carlos Cock
- Starring: Verónica Orozco; Andrés Toro
- Country of origin: Colombia
- Original language: Spanish
- No. of seasons: 1
- No. of episodes: 82

Production
- Camera setup: Multi-camera
- Production company: Vista Producciones

Original release
- Network: RCN Televisión
- Release: September 12, 2017 – January 10, 2018

Related
- Venganza; Garzón vive; Secretos de familia

Hermanos y hermanas is a Colombian telenovela produced by Vista Producciones for RCN Televisión, based on the American television series created by Jon Robin Baitz, titled Brothers & Sisters. It stars Verónica Orozco and Andrés Toro as the titular characters. It premiered on September 12, 2017, and concluded on January 10, 2018. In its first episode it obtained a total of 5.3 million viewers, becoming the sixth most watched program in Colombia and without being able to be a leader of audience in its schedule.

== Cast ==
- Verónica Orozco as Catalina Soto
- Patrick Delmas as Alejandro Villegas
- Luis Fernando Montoya as Guillermo Soto
- Estefanía Borge as Vicki
- Helena Mallarino as Nora Matiz
- Jimmy Vásquez as Carlos Villegas
- Juan Fernando Sánchez as Camilo Soto Matiz
- Marcela Agudelo as Sofía Vásquez
- Diego Pelaez as Manuel
- Katherine Vélez as Consuelo Álvarez
- Estefanía Godoy as Rebeca Soto Álvarez
- Alberto Pujol as Emilio Rubio
- José Restrepo as Lucas Soto Matiz
- Julián Orrego as Felipe Plomo Villegas
- Natasha Klauss as Sara Soto Matiz
- María Cristina Pimiento as Isabel
- Catalina Londoño as Elsa María
- Jairo Camargo as Saúl Matiz
- Andrés Toro as Tomás Soto Matiz
- Francisco Restrepo as Sebastián Duval Valencia
- Dylan Fuentes as Rodri Plomo
- Juan Pablo Puerta as Jeison
- Rodrigo Candamil as Juan Carlos Estrada
