= El man es Germán =

Colombian television series

- Genre: Comedy drama
- Created by: Juan Manuel Cáceres Niño; Héctor Alejandro Moncada
- Written by: boca.ilacamila
- Directed by: Consuelo González (seasons 1-4); Ramiro Meneses (season 4)
- Creative directors: Germán Lozada (seasons 1-3); Romel Amador Daconte (season 4); Roberto Kattah (season 4)
- Music by: Juan Gabriel Turbay
- Country of origin: Colombia
- Original language: Spanish
- No. of seasons: 4
- No. of episodes: 305 (list of episodes)

Production
- Production location: Bogota, Colombia
- Cinematography: Sergio García (seasons 1-3); Rodrigo Torres (season 4)
- Editor: Silvia Ayala
- Camera setup: Multi-camera
- Production company: RCN Televisión

Original release
- Network: RCN
- Release: 20 December 2010 – 20 December 2019

El man es Germán is a Colombian comedy-drama television series created by Juan Manuel Cáceres for RCN Televisión. The series is a spin-off of the Colombian telenovela Las detectivas y el Víctor. The plot focuses on the fun situations that punk rock Germán Quintero (Santiago Alarcón), and his friends and family live on a daily basis. The series original aired from 20 December 2010 to 6 February 2012. On 1 October 2018 it was confirmed that the series would be revived for a four-season, which premiered on 20 May 2019, and ended on 20 December 2019.

== Series overview ==
Series	Episodes	Originally released	
Series	Episodes	First released	Last released
1	103	20 December 2010	25 March 2011
2	37	22 August 2011	20 September 2011
3	25	12 December 2011	6 February 2012
4	140	20 May 2019	20 December 2019

== Cast ==
- Santiago Alarcón as Germán
- Marcela Gallego as Doña Grace
- Carlos Camacho as Marcelo Cantor
- Heidy Bermúdez as Jasbleidy
- Aida Bossa as Patty
- Santiago Rodríguez as Calixto
- Santiago Reyes as Frito
- Jesús David Forero as Jonathan
- Alberto Saavedra as Don Eugenio Gonzales
- Bárbara Pérea as Doña Pina
- Jenny Vargas as Lady
- Inés Prieto as Tía Yolanda Santos
- Diana Belmonte as Kassandra
- Omar Murillo as Bolo 8
- Rafael Zea as Maicol Giovanni
- Javier Eduardo Peraza as Bulto e sal
- Julián Arango as Don HP
- Laura Hernández as Britney
- Marcela Posada as Sandra Patiño
- Fabián Mendoza as Edil-Berto
- Miltón Lópezarrubla as Cónsul
- Katherine Castrillón as María Dolly
- Andrés Ruíz as Orteguita
- Biassini Segura as Rómulo
