= Santiago Alarcón =

Colombian actor

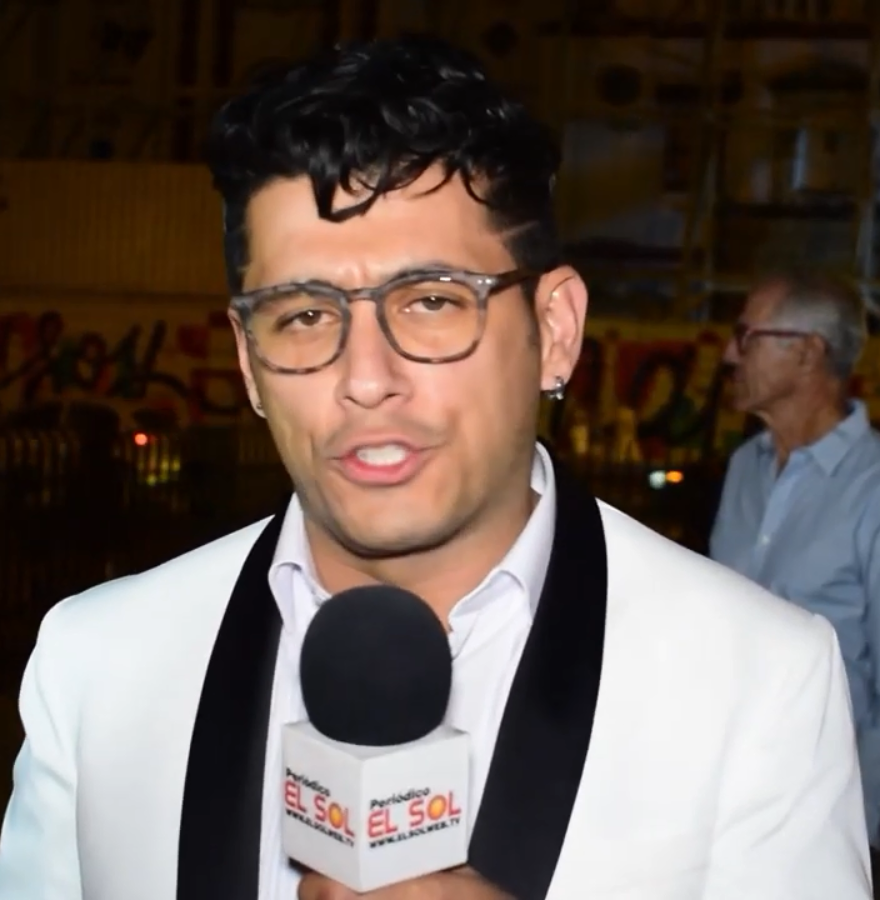
- Alarcón in 2019
- Born: Santiago Alejandro Alarcón Uribe; 23 November 1979 (age 46); Medellín, Colombia
- Occupation: Actor
- Years active: 1998–present
- Spouse: Cecilia Navia (m. 2005)
- Children: 2 María Alarcón, Matías Alarcón

Santiago Alejandro Alarcón Uribe (born on 23 November 1979 in Medellín, Colombia), is a Colombian actor. He is best known for his role of Germán in the RCN Televisión comedy drama El man es Germán. Later he obtained the leading role of Mauricio Reyna, in the telenovela Las Vega's. And he became more popular for playing the journalist Jaime Garzón, in Garzón vive.

== Personal life ==
Alarcón has been married to actress Cecilia Navia since 2005, whom he met at an acting academy in 1998. Currently the couple has two children; Matías and María.

== Filmography ==
Television performance
Year	Title	Role	Notes
1998	Amores como el nuestro	Unknown role	
2003	Sofía dame tiempo	Rodrigo	
2004	Me amarás bajo la lluvia	Unknown role	
2004	Te voy a enseñar a querer	Bernardo Ángeles	
2004	La viuda de la mafia	Osvaldo	
2005	El pasado no perdona	Unknown role	
2006	Hasta que la plata nos separe	Jaime Rincón	
2007–2008	Pura sangre	Juan	
2008	¿Quién amará a María?	Ramón Elías	
2009	Las detectivas y el Víctor	Germán "El Macho Alfa"	
2010–2019	El man es Germán	Germán "El Macho Alfa"	Main role (season 1–4); 305 episodes
2013	Contra las cuerdas	Lucho Contreras	
2015	Los hombres también lloran	Pablo	
2015–2016	Anónima	Maximiliano Velandia	Main role; 73 episodes
2016	The Girl	Dr. Horacio Fuentes	
2016–2017	Las Vega's	Mauricio Reyna	Main role; 72 episodes
2018	Garzón vive	Jaime Garzón	Main role; 80 episodes
2023	La primera vez	José Granados	Main role; 13 episodes
2026	Palacio	Alfonso Reyes Echandía	Main role
