= Verdad oculta =

Colombian police crime drama television series

- Genre: Police crime drama
- Based on: Una verdad oscura by Germán Castro Caycedo
- Written by: Verónica Triana; Pedro Miguel Rozo
- Directed by: Rodrigo Triana; Jorge Alí Triana
- Country of origin: Colombia
- Original language: Spanish
- No. of seasons: 1
- No. of episodes: 62

Production
- Production company: Dramax

Original release
- Network: RCN Televisión
- Release: 1 July – 28 September 2020

Verdad oculta is a Colombian police crime drama television series developed by Dramax for RCN Televisión that premiered on 1 July 2020. Based on the book Una verdad oscura by Germán Castro Caycedo, it was written by Verónica Triana and Pedro Miguel Rozo, and directed by Rodrigo Triana and Jorge Alí Triana.

The series was acquired by Sony Pictures Television for worldwide distribution. It is filmed in places like Urabá, Chocó, Costa Atlantica, La Dorada, Medellín and Bogotá.

The series is stars Verónica Orozco as Diana Manrique, and Rodrigo Candamil as Raúl Ceballos.

== Cast ==
- Verónica Orozco as Diana Manrique
- Rodrigo Candamil as Raúl Ceballos
- Andrés Suárez Montoya as Jorge Ramírez
- Andrés Castañeda as Uriel Zurria
- Sebastián Sierra as Gerónimo
- Juan Pablo Barragán as Dubán Correa "Alambres"
- Brenda Hanst as Irma Castaño
- Gustavo Angarita as Manuel Sepúlveda
- Pilar Álvarez as Cecilia Tamayo
- Víctor Hugo Morant as Procurador Fernando
- Eduardo López as Julián Botero
- María Barreto as Sandra Castañeda
- Jerónimo Cantillo as Yéison Vergara
- Brian Moreno as Fabio Montoya "Mesías"
- Andrés Felipe Martínez as Camilo Tapia
- Rodolfo Silva as Jhonny Zurria
- Nelson Camayo as William Gallo
- Julio Pachón as Alcides Montoya
- Brian Moreno as Fabio Montoya
- Lina Castrillón as Yolima Ferrero
- Valentina Duque as Zully Berrio
- Kevin Bury as Junior Zurria
- Pedro Roda as Comandante
- Mauricio Mejía as Jimmy Henao
- Sandra Reyes as Belén Caicedo
- Emilia Ceballos as Mayerly Garzón
- Valentina Afanador as Jazmín Berrio
- Ana María Durán as María Angélica Tamayo

== Television rating ==
Viewership and ratings per season of Verdad oculta
Season	Timeslot (COT)	Episodes	First aired		Last aired		Avg. viewers (millions)
Season	Timeslot (COT)	Episodes	Date	Viewers (millions)	Date	Viewers (millions)	Avg. viewers (millions)
1	Mon–Fri 10:00pm	62	1 July 2020	8.7	28 September 2020	7.3	6.37

== Episodes ==
No.	Title	Original release date	Colombia viewers (Rating points)
1	"Luego de varios años, Diana y Raúl se vuelven a encontrar"	1 July 2020	8.7
2	"Jorge se da cuenta que Raúl le envió un mensaje a Diana"	2 July 2020	9.0
3	"Zully busca vengarse de Uriel"	3 July 2020	8.7
4	"Jorge se reencuentra con Raúl y le cuenta sus planes con Diana"	6 July 2020	6.9
5	"Jeisson Vergara y Sandra se vinculan al Comando"	7 July 2020	7.2
6	"Raúl queda gravemente herido tras recibir un disparo"	8 July 2020	7.1
7	"‘La Chuqui’ acaba con la vida de Alcides"	9 July 2020	7.1
8	"Tras una discusión con Diana, Jorge se va de la casa"	10 July 2020	6.4
9	"Diana le pide a Jorge que vuelva a la casa"	13 July 2020	6.7
10	"Entre lágrimas, Raúl le hace una dura confesión a Diana"	14 July 2020	7.3
11	"Jorge le es infiel a Diana"	15 July 2020	7.4
12	"Raúl se infiltra en la fiesta de fin de año de Los Zurria"	16 July 2020	7.5
13	"Jhonny Zurria muere"	17 July 2020	8.2
14	"Fabio se une al Clan de Uriel"	21 July 2020	6.3
15	"El Clan del Norte organiza un paro armado"	22 July 2020	6.4
16	"Diana pasa la noche en la casa de Raúl"	23 July 2020	6.3
17	"Raúl se reintegra a El Comando"	24 July 2020	5.6
18	"Doris muere"	27 July 2020	6.4
19	"Diana le confiesa a Raúl que está embarazada"	28 July 2020	6.8
20	"Los hombres de Uriel se llevan a Zully"	29 July 2020	6.8
21	"Zully se vuelve a reencontrar con Uriel"	30 July 2020	6.8
22	"Diana descubre que Raúl pasó la noche con Sandra"	31 July 2020	7.7
23	"Obligada, Zully se casa con Uriel"	3 August 2020	7.5
24	"Raúl le cuenta a Diana sobre su romance con Sandra"	4 August 2020	7.2
25	"Jorge le confiesa a Diana que le fue infiel"	5 August 2020	6.6
26	"Junior le promete a Zully que la va a ayudar a escapar"	6 August 2020	6.4
27	"Zully es rescatada por el comando en medio del operativo"	7 August 2020	4.7
28	"Uriel se entera de que 'La Piraña' lo traicionó"	10 August 2020	6.4
29	"Raúl y Diana se besan"	11 August 2020	5.8
30	"Diana decide darle otra oportunidad a Jorge"	12 August 2020	6.3
31	"Al enterarse de la verdad, Jorge golpea fuertemente a Raúl"	13 August 2020	6.7
32	"'La Chuqui' acaba con la vida de 'La Piraña'"	14 August 2020	6.2
33	"Diana sufre un aborto espontáneo"	18 August 2020	5.5
34	"Jeisson se reencuentra con Sandra"	19 August 2020	5.3
35	"Junior habla con Diana y Raúl y accede a dar información sobre Uriel"	20 August 2020	5.6
36	"Raúl sorprende a Diana con una confesión"	21 August 2020	6.6
37	"Uriel descubre que Junior es el infiltrado"	24 August 2020	6.7
38	"Junior golpea a Uriel y lo deja gravemente herido"	25 August 2020	6.3
39	"Carroña se pronuncia sobre la muerte de Uriel Zurria"	26 August 2020	5.7
40	"'El Mesias' es detenido por la Policía"	27 August 2020	6.0
41	"Diana encuentra el video en el que Sepulveda confiesa que es el infiltrado"	28 August 2020	5.7
42	"Llega la orden de captura contra Sepúlveda, pero logra escapar"	31 August 2020	6.4
43	"Sepúlveda acaba con su vida"	1 September 2020	6.3
44	"Fabio le propone a Alambres asesinar a Uriel"	2 September 2020	6.4
45	"Alambres acepta la propuesta de 'El Mesías' de acabar con Uriel"	3 September 2020	6.5
46	"'El Mesías' es capturado por Diana"	4 September 2020	5.7
47	"El matrimonio de Diana y Jorge"	7 September 2020	6.1
48	"Encuentran sin vida a 'El Mesías'"	8 September 2020	5.7
49	"Diana y Raúl van juntos a una misión"	9 September 2020	5.0
50	"Raúl y Diana logran su primer objetivo en la misión"	10 September 2020	5.2
51	"Raúl y Diana identifican a 'La Chuqui'"	11 September 2020	5.1
52	"Irma se infiltra en el ejército de el Clan del Norte"	14 September 2020	5.4
53	"Diana y Raúl se besan y viven un apasionado momento"	15 September 2020	5.7
54	"'La Chuqui' recibe varios disparos y muere"	16 September 2020	5.3
55	"Carroña acaba con la vida de Jorge"	17 September 2020	4.8
56	"Por orden de Uriel, Carroña rapta a Zully"	18 September 2020	5.1
57	"Zully le dispara a Uriel"	21 September 2020	5.5
58	"Uriel arroja a un río a Zully y El Comando la rescata"	22 September 2020	5.3
59	"Raúl decide darse una oportunidad con Victoria"	23 September 2020	5.9
60	"Didier hiere a Jeisson"	24 September 2020	5.8
61	"El Comando tiene una dolorosa pérdida"	25 September 2020	5.8
62	"La importante misión de Raúl y Diana"	28 September 2020	7.3
