= Clara María Ochoa =

Colombian film producer

Clara María Ochoa is a Colombian film producer. She manages CMO Producciones, which promotes important Colombian films like Rosario Tijeras, Soñar no cuesta nada, Como el gato y el ratón (Like Cat and Mouse), Bolívar Soy Yo and Del amor y otros demonios (Of Love and Other Demons).
