= Como el gato y el ratón =

2002 film

- Como el gato y el ratón film promotional poster
- Directed by: Rodrigo Triana
- Written by: Jorge Hiller
- Produced by: Clara María Ochoa; Gustavo Angel Olaya
- Starring: Jairo Camargo; Alina Lozano; Patricia Maldonado; Gilberto Ramirez; Paola Rey; Manuel Jose Chavez
- Production company: CMO productions
- Release date: 23 September 2002 (San Sebastián Film Festival)
- Running time: 93 minutes
- Countries: France; Colombia
- Language: Spanish

Como el gato y el ratón (English: Like the cat and the mouse) is a 2002 French-Colombian comedy-drama film. It was directed by Rodrigo Triana, produced by Colombian filmmaker Clara María Ochoa, and stars Jairo Camargo, Alina Lozano, Patricia Maldonado, Gilberto Ramirez, Paola Rey and Manuel Jose Chavez.

The film deals with two families from a poor neighborhood in south Bogotá who await the arrival of electricity.

The film won the Premio de Apoyo a la Producción, Ministerio de Cultura, Dirección de Cinematografía (Colombia) 1998, Premio de Apoyo a la Postproducción, Ministerio de Cultura, Dirección de Cinematografía (Colombia) 2000, Círculo Precolombino de Oro Mejor Película Colombiana en el 19º Festival Internacional de Cine de Bogotá (Colombia) 2002, and the Biarritz Film Cinema Festival of Latin America.

== Plot ==
"La Estrella" is a poor neighborhood in south Bogotá, mostly inhabited by people displaced by violence. Electricity arrives and, despite objections, is greeted with jubilation. The district is grateful to the Brochero and Cristancho families.

Cayetano Brochero proposes stealing electricity from the posts along with his best friend Miguel Cristancho and the whole neighborhood. Kennedy Corzo, the mayor of the neighborhood knows the consequences of pirating electricity, and tries in vain to convince the people that such action could lead to jail time.

A dangerous cable passes through the Cristancho's clothes line just when Consuelo Cristancho goes to hang clothes. Consuelo asks her husband Miguel to tell Cayetano to remove the cable, but after a soccer game and a night of drinking, Cayetano forgets. At night, while Cayetano and his son Edson are watching a soccer game in TV, Consuelo scolds Miguel to remind Cayetano, and after a while seeing Consuelo talking to another neighbor, Miguel feels challenged and cuts the cable.

The next day Brochero face angry questioning over who had won the game. Miguel apologizes and admits to having cut the cable, but as a "joke". Even angrier, Cayetano gets a toy rat, belonging to his cat "Tapete", and puts it into Cristacho's daily "changua" soup. When Corzo and attorney Maria Angelica visit a restaurant to describe the consequences of pirating electricity. They find the rat and everyone flees.

Edson Brochero has his confirmation ceremony in the neighborhood chapel. Johana Cristancho, his neighbor was to sing at the ceremony but his mother forbids it. Cayetano and Miguel lead Kennedy to believe that their friendship is unbreakable, but later hold a reception to celebrate the confirmation. Albino is a homeless neighbor tricked into ruining the cake made in Edson's honor, causing the wrath of Brochero. Albino apologizes and fights with neighbors who tease him. Consuelo causes another fight. Albino spoils the car with groceries and Kennedy vainly tries to calm the fight.

Edson meets Johana and proposes to convince their parents to stop fighting. Johana says that her mother would make peace if Brochero apologizes. They declare their love in secret. Cristanchos hangs the cat from the Brochero house and Brochero's retaliate with molotov cocktails. Edson and Johana had seen the fire and Edson confesses to having had sex with Johana just to humiliate Cristancho. Miguel challenges Cayetano and his people to a fight to death. The two sides gather and are electrocuted when the electricity pole falls to the ground. The next morning, the power company announced it would install electricity and counters in homes, but finds only an empty district with Cristancho grandfather pulling a cart.
