= Just Alice =

Colombian television series

- Spanish: Simplemente Alicia
- Genre: Comedy drama
- Created by: Marta Betoldi
- Written by: Marta Betoldi; Esteban del Campo
- Directed by: Rafael Martínez Moreno; Catalina Hernández
- Starring: Verónica Orozco; Sebastián Carvajal; Michel Brown
- Composer: José Fernández
- Country of origin: Colombia
- Original language: Spanish
- No. of seasons: 1
- No. of episodes: 19

Production
- Executive producers: Juan Pablo Posada; Daniel Ucrós; Alex Marín
- Cinematography: Carlos Andrés Vallejo; Andrés García
- Editor: Catalina Candelaria García
- Production company: RCN Televisión

Original release
- Network: Netflix
- Release: 5 November 2025

Just Alice (Spanish: Simplemente Alicia) is a Colombian comedy drama television series produced by RCN Televisión and created by Marta Betoldi for Netflix. It stars Verónica Orozco, Sebastián Carvajal and Michel Brown. It premiered on 5 November 2025.

== Cast ==
=== Main ===
- Verónica Orozco as Alicia Fernández
- Sebastián Carvajal as Pablo Guevara
- Michel Brown as Alejandro "Alejo" Valdés
- Cony Camelo as Susana
- Julián Román as Marcelo Beltrán
- Leo Deluglio as Benjamín Laprida
- Ana María Medina as Laura
- Daniela Tapia as Carolina Rivera Valdés
- Fernando Arévalo as Eliseo Guevara
- Biassini Segura as Luis Fonseca
- Jacques Toukhmanian as Simón
- Diego Sarmiento as Ernesto
- Andrés Felipe Villada as Samuel Guevara

=== Recurring ===
- Luna Baxter as Rita
- Geraldine Zivic as Paula Laprida
- Felipe Botero as Father Juan
- Sebastián González as Frank
- Silvia de Dios as Verónica
- Andrés Toro as Martín
- Carlos Camacho as David
- Ernesto Benjumea as Dr. Álvaro Mancilla

== Episodes ==
| No. | Title | Original release date |
|---|---|---|
| 1 | "The Wedding" | 5 November 2025 |
| 2 | "Alejo" | 5 November 2025 |
| 3 | "Pablo" | 5 November 2025 |
| 4 | "I Love You, I Love You" | 5 November 2025 |
| 5 | "The After" | 5 November 2025 |
| 6 | "White Lies" | 5 November 2025 |
| 7 | "It's Not You, It's Me" | 5 November 2025 |
| 8 | "I Love You Lots, A Little, Not at All" | 5 November 2025 |
| 9 | "Christmas Eve" | 5 November 2025 |
| 10 | "Good News" | 5 November 2025 |
| 11 | "The Decision" | 5 November 2025 |
| 12 | "You Only Have One Mother... Thank God" | 5 November 2025 |
| 13 | "The Confession" | 5 November 2025 |
| 14 | "Daddy" | 5 November 2025 |
| 15 | "New Year, New Life" | 5 November 2025 |
| 16 | "The Truth" | 5 November 2025 |
| 17 | "Lost" | 5 November 2025 |
| 18 | "One Plus One Makes Three" | 5 November 2025 |
| 19 | "Happy End" | 5 November 2025 |
