= List of El man es Germán episodes =

The following is a list of episodes of the Colombian television series El man es Germán, broadcast on RCN Televisión from 20 December 2019 until 6 February 2012. On 1 October 2018 it was confirmed that the series would be revived for a fourth season, which premiered on 20 May 2019.

== Series overview ==
Series	Episodes	Originally released	
Series	Episodes	First released	Last released
1	103	20 December 2010	25 March 2011
2	37	22 August 2011	20 September 2011
3	25	12 December 2011	6 February 2012
4	140	20 May 2019	20 December 2019

== Episodes ==
=== Season 1 (2010–11) ===
No. overall	No. in season	Title	Original release date (Note: Because it is unknown on date these episodes were broadcast in their original broadcast. The dates on which they were uploaded to the official website of the series were used.)
1	1	"El regreso del macho alfa"	24 April 2019
2	2	"El cumpleaños del Tigre"	24 April 2019
3	3	"Las cenizas del abuelo"	24 April 2019
4	4	"Malos entendidos"	24 April 2019
5	5	"El Edil… Berto"	24 April 2019
6	6	"Soñar no cuesta nada"	24 April 2019
7	7	"Buenos ejemplos"	24 April 2019
8	8	"Por el honor"	24 April 2019
9	9	"El dinero no es todo en la vida"	24 April 2019
10	10	"No me rendiré"	24 April 2019
11	11	"El amigazo de la infancia"	24 April 2019
12	12	"Técnicas de supervivencia"	24 April 2019
13	13	"Un amigo es..."	24 April 2019
14	14	"Situación embarazosa"	24 April 2019
15	15	"El perro de los 12 millones"	24 April 2019
16	16	"El tiro por la culata"	24 April 2019
17	17	"La inquilina"	24 April 2019
18	18	"La primera conquista del Tigre"	24 April 2019
19	19	"Los teloneros"	24 April 2019
20	20	"El redentor"	24 April 2019
21	21	"El revendedor"	24 April 2019
22	22	"Las cosas importantes"	24 April 2019
23	23	"Viejo zorro viejo"	24 April 2019
24	24	"El campeón mundial"	24 April 2019
25	25	"El ladrón"	24 April 2019
26	26	"Una mujer muy peligrosa"	24 April 2019
27	27	"Enamorado de la profe"	24 April 2019
28	28	"El macho responsable"	24 April 2019
29	29	"El milagro de navidad"	24 April 2019
30	30	"Bola 8 infiel"	24 April 2019
31	31	"El campeón"	24 April 2019
32	32	"El amigo secreto"	24 April 2019
33	33	"Me gané la lotería llave"	24 April 2019
34	34	"El germancho de la mancha"	24 April 2019
35	35	"El arbitro"	24 April 2019
36	36	"El hijo pródigo"	24 April 2019
37	37	"El desmemoriado"	24 April 2019
38	38	"Despedida de soltera"	24 April 2019
39	39	"Noche de brujas"	24 April 2019
40	40	"Papito Isidro"	24 April 2019
41	41	"Pintores de brocha gorda"	24 April 2019
42	42	"Mala suerte"	24 April 2019
43	43	"La decepción de Doña Grace"	24 April 2019
44	44	"Instructores de buceo"	24 April 2019
45	45	"Soñando con Santa Marta"	24 April 2019
46	46	"El mejor papá del mundo"	24 April 2019
47	47	"Aeróbicos en la playa"	24 April 2019
48	48	"Los recreadores"	24 April 2019
49	49	"Señor locutor"	24 April 2019
50	50	"El regreso del franchute"	24 April 2019
51	51	"Empresa transportadora"	24 April 2019
52	52	"Pagar en especie"	24 April 2019
53	53	"Dólares calientes"	24 April 2019
54	54	"El fantasma del gran gimnasio"	24 April 2019
55	55	"El matrimonio"	24 April 2019
56	56	"Estatua humana"	24 April 2019
57	57	"De paseo con los gringos"	24 April 2019
58	58	"El hijo negado"	24 April 2019
59	59	"El prom"	24 April 2019
60	60	"El cacerolazo"	24 April 2019
61	61	"La novia de Frito"	25 April 2019
62	62	"Primera vez"	25 April 2019
63	63	"Germán y el gallo"	25 April 2019
64	64	"Ser mamá es cosa de machos"	25 April 2019
65	65	"La conciliación"	25 April 2019
66	66	"El mapalé"	25 April 2019
67	67	"Amor en la red"	25 April 2019
68	68	"El polvito blanco"	25 April 2019
69	69	"Posgrado en conquista"	25 April 2019
70	70	"El extra–actor"	25 April 2019
71	71	"El regreso del Silver Halcón"	25 April 2019
72	72	"¡Corra Germán, corra!"	25 April 2019
73	73	"Lo que es pa' uno, es pa' uno"	25 April 2019
74	74	"Happy Birthday to me"	25 April 2019
75	75	"Zapatero a tus zapatos"	25 April 2019
76	76	"El amor es así"	25 April 2019
77	77	"La tusa de Frito"	25 April 2019
78	78	"El reinado de la simpatía"	25 April 2019
79	79	"Lo quiero mucho papá"	25 April 2019
80	80	"Abuso de confianza"	25 April 2019
81	81	"Acto de misericordia"	25 April 2019
82	82	"Habemus circus"	25 April 2019
83	83	"El ángel y el diablo"	25 April 2019
84	84	"Paternidad irresponsable"	25 April 2019
85	85	"La convivencia"	25 April 2019
86	86	"El bachiller"	25 April 2019
87	87	"Adiós escuelita de fútbol"	25 April 2019
88	88	"Llama la llama"	25 April 2019
89	89	"Me voy"	25 April 2019
90	90	"Qué parto"	25 April 2019
91	91	"Germán Bizarro"	25 April 2019
92	92	"Solo por la pinta"	25 April 2019
93	93	"Tras bambalinas"	25 April 2019
94	94	"Por un hot dog"	25 April 2019
95	95	"De amigos a enemigos"	25 April 2019
96	96	"Claustrofobia"	25 April 2019
97	97	"Pie de atleta"	25 April 2019
98	98	"Suerte de tenerte"	25 April 2019
99	99	"Cobarde, cobarde"	25 April 2019
100	100	"Los libretistas"	25 April 2019
101	101	"We Are The Church"	25 April 2019
102	102	"Rumbo a los Unites"	25 April 2019
103	103	"Donde hubo fuego"	25 April 2019

=== Season 2 (2011) ===
No. overall	No. in season	Title	Original release date
104	1	"De sus cenizas"	25 April 2019
105	2	"Mi Buenaventura"	25 April 2019
106	3	"Nadie sabe lo que tiene"	25 April 2019
107	4	"Los abuelo alfa"	25 April 2019
108	5	"No se quede callado, denuncie"	25 April 2019
109	6	"Una noche de copas, una noche loca"	25 April 2019
110	7	"El día del padre"	25 April 2019
111	8	"La luna de miel"	25 April 2019
112	9	"Una pequeña lección"	25 April 2019
113	10	"Maldita vanidad"	25 April 2019
114	11	"Una pequeñísima historia de amor"	25 April 2019
115	12	"Diente por diente"	25 April 2019
116	13	"El hombre de mi vida"	25 April 2019
117	14	"La cita perfecta"	25 April 2019
118	15	"Nada es porque sí"	25 April 2019
119	16	"La gran oportunidad"	25 April 2019
120	17	"La maid… masita"	25 April 2019
121	18	"Qué dilema"	25 April 2019
122	19	"El mercado ganador"	25 April 2019
123	20	"El matrimonio de Michael Giovanni"	25 April 2019
124	21	"Todo o nada"	25 April 2019
125	22	"El Tigre no es como lo pintan"	25 April 2019
126	23	"Quiero un hijo"	25 April 2019
127	24	"Los exhibicionistas"	25 April 2019
128	25	"El juicio"	25 April 2019
129	26	"Sabia decisión"	25 April 2019
130	27	"La reconciliación"	25 April 2019
131	28	"La radionovela"	25 April 2019
132	29	"El paseo millonario"	25 April 2019
133	30	"En busca del camino"	25 April 2019
134	31	"La visita del alcalde"	25 April 2019
135	32	"La solupresa"	25 April 2019
136	33	"Ni una caloría más"	25 April 2019
137	34	"La plaga"	25 April 2019
138	35	"El enamorado secreto"	25 April 2019
139	36	"¡Por fin!, parte 1"	25 April 2019
140	37	"¡Por fin!, parte 2"	25 April 2019

=== Season 3 (2011–12) ===
No. overall	No. in season	Title	Original release date
141	1	"Siempre Germán"	25 April 2019
142	2	"La patria boba"	25 April 2019
143	3	"El sonámbulo"	26 April 2019
144	4	"Los lavadores"	26 April 2019
145	5	"El papá de Calixto"	26 April 2019
146	6	"Qué fácil es ser Germán"	26 April 2019
147	7	"El Mister Colombia"	26 April 2019
148	8	"De que las hay, las hay"	26 April 2019
149	9	"Tan dentro de mí"	26 April 2019
150	10	"El hijuepocho"	26 April 2019
151	11	"Del más allá"	26 April 2019
152	12	"Salto de fe"	26 April 2019
153	13	"Cinco pa’ las doce"	26 April 2019
154	14	"Nunca es tarde"	26 April 2019
155	15	"Demasiado tarde"	26 April 2019
156	16	"Cita triple"	26 April 2019
157	17	"¿Por qué está triste el payaso?"	26 April 2019
158	18	"La felicidad"	26 April 2019
159	19	"Déjese hablar"	26 April 2019
160	20	"Hoy me siento chimbita"	26 April 2019
161	21	"Eco Frito"	26 April 2019
162	22	"Cuando como camarón me voy"	26 April 2019
163	23	"El man es Germán, parte 1"	26 April 2019
164	24	"El man es Germán, parte 2"	26 April 2019
166	25	"Especial día de los inocentes"	26 April 2019

=== Season 4 (2019) ===
No. overall	No. in season	Title	Original release date	Colombia viewers (millions)
Series
167	1	"Germán inaugura su propio gimnasio"	20 May 2019	10.8
168	2	"Germán y Don HP compiten por ser el padrino de La Leona"	21 May 2019	12.3
169	3	"La manada conoce a Alicia"	22 May 2019	11.3
170	4	"Germán y Alicia ganan un concurso juntos"	23 May 2019	11.2
171	5	"El Tigre define su futuro"	24 May 2019	9.7
172	6	"La manada va en busca de Frito"	27 May 2019	10.7
173	7	"El despecho de Maicol Giovanny"	28 May 2019	9.6
174	8	"La manada cuida a Jasbleidy"	29 May 2019	10.3
175	9	"La gran estafa"	30 May 2019	10.3
176	10	"El Tigre afronta su primer reto profesional"	31 May 2019	10.3
177	11	"Germán, el entrenador de Parkour"	4 June 2019	9.6
178	12	"El Tigre sufre como millennial"	5 June 2019	8.8
179	13	"Maicol y doña Grace, cada vez más cerca"	6 June 2019	9.6
180	14	"Frito tiene una nueva amiga"	7 June 2019	8.5
181	15	"Germán tiene nueva competencia"	10 June 2019	8.6
182	16	"Germán entrena a Cónsul"	11 June 2019	7.8
183	17	"El regreso de la Picapolla le rompe el corazón a Doña Grace"	13 June 2019	9.1
184	18	"El Tigre organiza un torneo de videojuegos"	14 June 2019	7.6
185	19	"Don HP intenta conquistar a Doña Grace"	17 June 2019	8.4
186	20	"Germán enfrenta un reto de Ballet"	18 June 2019	6.5
187	21	"Britney y El Tigre atraviesan por una crisis de pareja"	19 June 2019	6.2
188	22	"Germán ayuda a Britney con una serenata para Don HP"	20 June 2019	8.7
189	23	"Germán y Patty planean su primera cita"	21 June 2019	8.5
190	24	"La llegada de Ceccilia"	25 June 2019	8.7
191	25	"Jazmín vuelve para confundir sentimentalmente a Germán"	26 June 2019	8.4
192	26	"Encerrados en la casa embrujada"	27 June 2019	6.5
193	27	"Germán enloquece"	28 June 2019	4.1
194	28	"Reconciliación"	1 July 2019	6.4
195	29	"Amor en redes"	2 July 2019	6.1
196	30	"Paloma llega a la comarca"	3 July 2019	6.6
197	31	"Maicol Giovanny quiere separarse de la Picapolla"	4 July 2019	7.5
198	32	"Germán es discriminado por su cresta"	5 July 2019	7.1
199	33	"Britney se presenta en el Show de las Estrellas"	8 July 2019	8.6
200	34	"Una lesión en el gimnasio del Macho Alfa"	9 July 2019	8.0
201	35	"Bulto E’ Sal cumple uno de sus más grandes sueños"	10 July 2019	7.6
202	36	"Germán se renueva"	11 July 2019	7.2
203	37	"Un viaje accidentado"	12 July 2019	7.3
204	38	"La vanidad cuesta mucho"	15 July 2019	8.0
205	39	"Terapia de pareja con Yokoi Kenji"	16 July 2019	8.1
206	40	"Testigo canino"	17 July 2019	8.9
207	41	"La manada se reúne para ver el final de una novela"	18 July 2019	7.5
208	42	"Ayuda desde el más allá"	19 July 2019	6.7
209	43	"El reto de Internet"	22 July 2019	7.9
210	44	"Germán busca plata para pagar el curso del Tigre"	23 July 2019	8.6
211	45	"Salvador, el hipnotizador"	24 July 2019	8.1
212	46	"El anciano challenge"	25 July 2019	8.0
213	47	"Un edil estafador"	26 July 2019	7.1
214	48	"El perro bandido"	29 July 2019	7.5
215	49	"Un fan intensamente peligroso"	30 July 2019	7.0
216	50	"El reencuentro de Derlys y Germán"	31 August 2019	8.3
217	51	"Un cuento de Navidad"	1 August 2019	8.0
218	52	"Don HP y Britney se llevan una gran sorpresa"	2 August 2019	6.2
219	53	"Germán ayuda a Pelos"	5 August 2019	8.4
220	54	"Germán quiere ayudar a Renacuajo a cambiar de vida"	6 August 2019	7.2
221	55	"La manada se une para hacer un show de payasos"	8 August 2019	6.5
222	56	"Maicol y Doña Grace participan en un show de baile"	9 August 2019	6.1
223	57	"El tío Alfonso"	12 August 2019	8.2
224	58	"Cónsul tiene su primera cita con Madeline"	13 August 2019	8.1
225	59	"La manada se une para vender papayas"	14 August 2019	7.7
226	60	"Mirta vuelve a la comarca"	15 August 2019	7.9
227	61	"Miss Simpatía II"	16 August 2019	6.7
228	62	"Germán acepta la invitación a salir de Patricia"	20 August 2019	6.9
229	63	"Britney ayuda a Patty a realizar un comercial"	21 August 2019	6.4
230	64	"El gringo Tom le hace una oferta muy especial a Patty"	22 August 2019	6.9
231	65	"Extrañando a Calixto"	23 August 2019	6.5
232	66	"El gran amor de la tía Yolanda"	26 August 2019	7.4
233	67	"La loca Azucena"	27 August 2019	7.4
234	68	"Ellos están aquí"	28 August 2019	7.3
235	69	"Doña Grace va al concierto de sus sueños"	29 August 2019	7.2
236	70	"Un partido para el recuerdo"	30 August 2019	5.9
237	71	"Papito, déjese hablar"	2 September 2019	6.8
238	72	"Frito, el modelo"	3 September 2019	7.0
239	73	"Permiso concedido"	4 September 2019	6.7
240	74	"La Pica Grace"	5 September 2019	6.7
241	75	"La historia de amor entre Britney y El Tigre"	6 September 2019	4.0
242	76	"Frito invita a salir a Paloma"	9 September 2019	7.6
243	77	"Don HP se comporta de forma extraña"	10 September 2019	5.3
244	78	"Arantxa se escapa de la cárcel y vuelve a la comarca"	11 September 2019	6.8
245	79	"Evento de lucha libre"	12 September 2019	6.9
246	80	"Las aventuras de la manada"	13 September 2019	5.6
247	81	"Buscando a Nemo…cón"	16 September 2019	7.1
248	82	"La loca Azucena regresa a la comarca"	17 September 2019	7.3
249	83	"Don H quiere ser Edil"	18 September 2019	7.6
Special (2019)
250	84	"Especial de bloopers"	19 September 2019	7.0
Series
251	85	"Noche de recuerdos"	20 September 2019	5.8
252	86	"La manada ayuda a Matilde a darle el último adiós a su gato"	23 September 2019	7.5
253	87	"Maicol Giovanny se reencuentra con la picapolla"	24 September 2019	5.7
254	88	"Patty, la invitada de Salomón"	25 September 2019	4.9
255	89	"El Tigre se inventa una historia de fantasía para arrullar a Jasbleidy"	26 September 2019	4.1
256	90	"Intrusos en el baúl de los recuerdos"	27 September 2019	4.1
257	91	"Jasbleidy se encuentra en una clínica de reposo"	30 September 2019	4.8
258	92	"El Tigre va hasta la clínica de reposo a entregar un pedido"	1 October 2019	4.8
259	93	"Un encuentro muy especial"	2 October 2019	4.6
260	94	"Aparece la mamá de Bulto E’ Sal"	3 October 2019	4.6
261	95	"Noche de recuerdos a cargo de Patty y Doña Grace"	4 October 2019	4.0
262	96	"El resfriado de la manada"	7 October 2019	3.3
263	97	"La manada ayuda a un niño que sufre de maltrato"	8 October 2019	4.7
264	98	"Inteligencia artificial"	9 October 2019	3.9
265	99	"La propuesta de matrimonio de Cónsul"	10 October 2019	3.1
266	100	"Noche de recuerdos"	11 October 2019	2.7
267	101	"Germán acepta que Rosa y sus primas se queden en el gimnasio"	15 October 2019	3.4
268	102	"Una manada de escoltas"	16 October 2019	3.9
269	103	"Ciberbullying"	17 October 2019	3.4
270	104	"Cónsul y Patty revisan el baúl de los recuerdos"	18 October 2019	3.0
271	105	"El beso del marrano"	21 October 2019	4.0
272	106	"El capitán chancleta"	22 October 2019	3.4
273	107	"El matrimonio de Cónsul"	23 October 2019	2.5
274	108	"Maicol Giovanny se prepara para un casting"	24 October 2019	3.1
275	109	"La conversación de los niños con los candidatos a la Alcaldía de Bogotá"	26 October 2019	3.6
276	110	"El cumpleaños #1 de la leona"	28 October 2019	3.8
277	111	"Los cobradores"	30 October 2019	2.7
278	112	"Oe, qué tiro"	31 October 2019	2.5
279–280	113–114	"La cita de Don H y Grace"	5 November 2019	3.4
279–280	113–114	"Letra menuda"	5 November 2019	3.4
281	115	"Un problema de peso"	7 November 2019	3.0
282	116	"Con H de Hidalgo"	8 November 2019	2.7
283	117	"Aldemártico"	12 November 2019	2.7
284	118	"El mejor papá del mundo"	15 November 2019	N/A
285	119	"Grace es internada en la misma clínica de reposo donde está Jasbleidy"	18 November 2019	N/A
286	120	"San Francisco de Asís hazlo Asís"	19 November 2019	N/A
287	121	"La familia de Madeline"	21 November 2019	N/A
288	122	"Por eso me quiero separar"	25 November 2019	N/A
289	123	"Recordando a mamá"	26 November 2019	N/A
