= Better Watch Out =

2016 psychological horror Christmas film

- Theatrical release poster
- Directed by: Chris Peckover
- Screenplay by: Zack Kahn; Chris Peckover
- Story by: Zack Kahn
- Produced by: Brett Thornquest; Brion Hambel; Sidonie Abbene; Paul Jensen
- Starring: Olivia DeJonge; Levi Miller; Ed Oxenbould; Aleks Mikic; Dacre Montgomery; Patrick Warburton; Virginia Madsen
- Cinematography: Carl Robertson
- Edited by: Julie-Anne de Ruvo
- Music by: Brian Cachia
- Production companies: Storm Vision Entertainment; Best Medicine Productions
- Distributed by: Well Go USA (United States); Rialto Distribution; Universal Pictures (Australia)
- Release dates: September 22, 2016 (Fantastic Fest); October 6, 2017 (United States); November 23, 2017 (Australia)
- Running time: 89 minutes
- Countries: United States; Australia
- Language: English
- Budget: $3 million
- Box office: $188,756

Better Watch Out (formerly titled Safe Neighborhood) is a 2016 Christmas psychological horror film directed by Chris Peckover, from a script he co-wrote with Zack Kahn. It stars Olivia DeJonge, Levi Miller, Ed Oxenbould, Aleks Mikic, Dacre Montgomery, Patrick Warburton and Virginia Madsen. Set on a quiet suburban street, the film follows a babysitter who must defend a 12-year-old child from intruders, only to discover it is far from a normal home invasion.

Better Watch Out had its world premiere at Fantastic Fest on September 22, 2016, and was released in the United States on October 6, 2017, by Well Go USA and in Australia on November 23, 2017, by Rialto Distribution. The film received generally positive reviews for Peckover's directing, the film's twists and the performances of the cast, but drew some criticism for its tonal inconsistencies and ending. It grossed $188,756 on a budget of $3 million.

== Plot ==
At Christmas time, 17-year-old Ashley is babysitting precocious 12-year-old Luke Lerner. Luke has romantic feelings for Ashley and unsuccessfully attempts to seduce her while watching a horror film. Eerie happenings outside put Ashley on edge, but it ultimately appears to be just Luke's best friend, Garrett, who has arrived to visit. Hearing a window break upstairs, the trio find a brick inscribed with "U leave and U die." Garrett panics and runs out the back door, but is apparently killed by an unknown shooter.

Shocked, Ashley and Luke run upstairs and hide in the attic. Ashley almost breaks her neck from a fall but Luke catches her. After they run into Luke's room and hide in his closet, a masked intruder armed with a shotgun walks in. Ashley recognizes the mask as one of Luke's and tells the intruder to take it off, revealing Garrett. Ashley realizes that Luke was hoping to seduce her by scaring her and staging a rescue. Angered, Ashley berates Luke before Luke knocks her unconscious.

Luke binds Ashley with duct tape, forcing her to play truth or dare. Her boyfriend Ricky arrives at the house after receiving a text message sent by Ashley earlier, though it is later revealed to have been sent by Luke. When Ricky fails to find Ashley, he realizes that something is wrong. Luke tries to knock him out but fails. Attacking Luke, Ricky is threatened by Garrett with the shotgun. Luke knocks Ricky out and they tie him up beside Ashley.

While Ashley uses a shard of glass to cut herself free, Luke hits Ricky with a paint can, killing him. Horrified, Ashley threatens Luke at gunpoint, before realizing that the gun is empty. She tries to escape to a group of carollers outside, but Luke uses the brick tossed through the upstairs window to knock her out again before she can alert them.

Luke calls Ashley's ex-boyfriend, Jeremy, claiming that she wants him to write an apology letter. While Jeremy does so, Luke hangs him from a tree, making the apology look like a suicide note. Garrett has a change of heart and starts to free Ashley, but is killed by Luke. Luke stabs Ashley in the neck and stages the scene to frame Jeremy. Afterward, he goes to bed and waits for the return of his parents, who contact the police. Ashley survives, having placed duct tape over the stab wound to stop the bleeding. Luke watches from his bedroom window as Ashley gives him the finger before being wheeled into the ambulance.

== Cast ==
- Olivia DeJonge as Ashley
- Levi Miller as Luke Lerner
- Ed Oxenbould as Garrett, Luke's friend
- Aleks Mikic as Ricky
- Dacre Montgomery as Jeremy
- Patrick Warburton as Robert Lerner, Luke's father
- Virginia Madsen as Deandra Lerner, Luke's mother

== Production ==
The film was shot in Sydney, Australia, in January and February 2016. It was originally set to be filmed in South Carolina for $500,000 when director Chris Peckover was approached by Australian producer Brett Thornquest, who offered a $3 million budget to shoot the film in Australia after hearing Peckover's mother was an Australian native.

== Release ==
In May 2017, North American distribution rights to Better Watch Out were acquired by Well Go USA, which released the film theatrically and through video on demand on October 6, 2017. In Australia, it was released in select theaters on November 23, 2017, by Rialto Distribution.

=== Home media ===
The film was released on DVD and Blu-ray by Well Go USA on December 5, 2017.

== Reception ==
=== Critical response ===
On review aggregator website Rotten Tomatoes, Better Watch Out has an approval rating of 89% based on 65 reviews, with an average rating of 6.9/10. The site's critical consensus reads, "Carried by its charismatic young cast, Better Watch Out is an adorably sinister holiday horror film." On Metacritic, the film has a weighted average score of 67 out of 100 based on 13 critics, indicating "generally favorable" reviews.

Luke Buckmaster of The Guardian gave the film a rating of 4 stars out of 5 and praised the performances of the actors, saying that, "deranged mind games and faultless performances in Christmas horror". Bill Goodykoontz of AZ Central praised the performances of the actors: "The performances are uniformly good" and concluded his review by saying that, "Better Watch Out is for fans of twisted, unhinged horror" and gave the film a rating of 3.5 stars out of 5. Simon Abrams of RogerEbert.com was not impressed with the film and said that, "Better Watch Out is an infuriating sit because it requires you to invest in the programmatic bullying of a certain type of character, then cheer on that same stock type as he or she defies expectations and refuses to be pummeled into oblivion. [...] When the film ends, we've been traded one set of unchallenging cliches for another" and gave the film a rating of 1 star out of 4.

=== Accolades ===
Award	Date of ceremony	Category	Nominee(s)	Result	Ref.
Saturn Awards	June 27, 2018	Best Horror Film	Better Watch Out	Nominated	

== See also ==
- Holiday horror
- List of films set around Christmas
- Christmas horror
