= Las Vega's (Colombian TV series) =

2016 Colombian television series

- Genre: Telenovela
- Based on: Las Vega's
- Screenplay by: Héctor Moncada; Cecilia Percy; Laura Bolaño
- Directed by: Fabio Rubiano; Ramiro Meneces
- Creative director: Ana María Carvajal
- Music by: Miguel Ángel de Narváez
- Country of origin: Colombia
- Original language: Spanish
- No. of seasons: 1
- No. of episodes: 72

Production
- Executive producer: Jaime Sánchez Cristo
- Producer: Silvia Durán
- Editor: Paola Mejía
- Camera setup: Multi-camera

Original release
- Network: RCN
- Release: 26 October 2016 – 10 February 2017

Related
- Las Bravo

Las Vega's is a Colombian comedy drama television series produced by Silvia Durán for RCN Televisión. It is an adaptation of the Chilean telenovela of the same name, and premiered on 26 October 2016, and concluded on 10 February 2017. The series stars an ensemble cast, starting with the singer Greeicy Rendón, Natalia Ramírez, Elizabeth Minotta, and Camila Zárate, along to the male cast; starting with Tiberio Cruz, Santiago Alarcón, Antonio Jiménez, Luis Alfredo Velasco, and Juan Alfonso Baptista.

The series revolves around of the Vega Díaz family, who live happily until the family's patriarch suddenly dies, leaving his wife and three daughters Mariana, Antonia and Camila in total bankruptcy. After they receive the news, the four women discover that their family's patriarch had a dedicated nightclub for men, and thanks to this nightclub they have the brilliant idea of turning it into a women's-only club, hiring 4 strippers, who become more than just employees for them.

The first episode of the series premiered with a total of 8.6 million viewers, becoming the third most watched programs nationwide in Colombia. Despite having premiered with a good average, he failed to overcome the expectations of the network, and received negative reviews from the Colombian audience; who did not receive the series in a good way for "showing naked men" at a schedule when there are still children awake. The final episode of the series ranked fifth as the least watched show with a total of 6.9 million viewers.

== Cast ==
=== Main ===
- Natalia Ramírez as Verónica María Bolaños de Vega
- Santiago Alarcón as Mauricio Reyna
- Alejandro Martínez as Álvaro Sandoval
- Juan Alfonso Baptista as Vicente Correa
- Greeicy Rendón as Camila Eugenia Vega Bolaños
- Camila Zárate as Antonia Vega Bolaños
- Elizabeth Minotta as Mariana de los Ángeles Vega Bolaños
- Luis Alfredo Velasco as José Luis "Coto" Rodríguez
- Tiberio Cruz as Pedro Vargas
- Antonio Jiménez as Robinson Garzón
- Carlos Manuel Vesga as Germán de Jesús Ordóñez Prieto
- Juan Manuel Restrepo as Kenny Marín
- Marcela Valencia as Rocío
- Diana Mendoza as Jesica Mejía
- Carlos Hurtado as Carlos Vega
- Gustavo Ángel as Concejal Javier Morales
- Biassini Segura as Carlos "Carlitos" Vega
- Julián Caicedo as Benjamín Orozco
- Javier Gardeazábal as Renzo Sandoval
- Cindy Yacamán as María José Duarte
- Mónica Uribe as Natalia de Vargas
- Juan Pablo Manzanera as Antonio "Toñito" Orozco Vega
- Alberto León Jaramillo as Lorenzo

=== Recurring ===
- Mónica Pardo as Natalia
- Luly Bossa as Yolanda Lozano de Sandoval
- Estefany Escobar as Lorena Cecilia Morales
- Jorge Monterrosa as Macardo Figueroa
- Manuel Busquets as Correa
- Giancarlo Mendoza as Javier

== Awards and nominations ==
Year	Award	Category	Work	Result
2017	India Catalina Awards	Actress or Actor Revelation of the Year	Elizabeth Minotta	Nominated
