= Garzón vive =

TV series about Jaime Garzón's life

- Genre: Telenovela
- Created by: Juan Carlos Pérez
- Starring: Santiago Alarcón
- Country of origin: Colombia
- Original language: Spanish
- No. of seasons: 1
- No. of episodes: 89

Production
- Production locations: Bogotá, Colombia
- Camera setup: Multi-camera

Original release
- Network: RCN Televisión
- Release: 15 January – 1 June 2018

Related
- Hermanos y hermanas

Garzón vive is a Colombian telenovela that premiered on RCN Televisión on 15 January 2018 and ended on 1 June 2018. Created by Juan Carlos Pérez, based on the life of the Colombian comedian, politician and journalist Jaime Garzón. It stars Santiago Alarcón as the titular character.

This TV series does not have the approval of the Garzón family, which, led by María Soledad 'Marisol', defender of her brother's legacy, announced lawsuits against RCN for misrepresenting her brother's story.

== Cast ==
- Santiago Alarcón as Jaime Garzón
- Sebastián Gutierrez as Young Jaime
- Darío Cifuentes as Child Jaime
- Zharick León as Yolanda
- Diana Belmonte as Cravis
- Alberto León Jaramillo
- Jacques Touckmanian as Mariano Garzón
- Carmenza González as Graciela de Garzón
- Cecilia Navia as Soledad Cifuentes
- Laura Rodríguez as Matsy
- Diana Wiswell as Julia Garzón Adulta
- Katherine Velez as Gabriela Másmela de Cifuentes
- Natalia Jerez as Maribel Sánchez
- Mario Ruiz as Alejandro Cortez
- Carlos Camacho as Santiago Villegas
- Julio Escallón as El Negro
- Jacques Toukhmanian as Alfredo Garzón
- María José Vargas Agudelo as Natasha Fonseca
- Santiago Rodríguez as Mauricio Vargas
- Nicolás Montero as Camilo Caballero
- Matías Maldonado as Bernardo Ortega Hoyos
- Carolina Cuervo as Lucy
- Viviana Sandoval as Shifon
- Fernando Rojas as Nestor Morales
- Germán Escallón as Padre Cuervo
- Carlos Hurtado as Tobías Garzón
- Luis Fernando Hoyos as Jorge Arenas
- Laura Perico as Tatiana Sáenz Santamaría
- Silvia de Dios as Elvira
- Mauricio Iragorri as Gerente
- Jorge López as Jorge Consuegra
- Mabel Moreno as Angela del Valle
- Rodolfo Silva as Comandante Angarita
- Waldo Urrego as Francisco Rueda
- Margarita Rosa de Francisco as Claudia de Francisco
- Carlos Andrés Ramírez as Tulio
