= Arelys Henao =

Colombian singer and songwriter

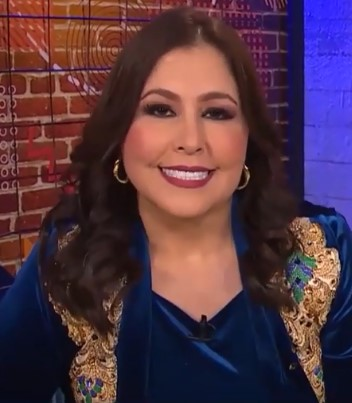
- Born: December 3, 1976 (age 49); Sabanalarga, Antioquia, Colombia
- Occupations: Singer; composer
- Years active: 1988–present
- Spouse: Wilfredo Hurtado
- Musical career
- Genre: Música popular
- Instruments: Vocals

Luz Arelys Henao Ruiz (born 3 December 1976), is a Colombian singer and songwriter.

== Career ==
Arelys was born in the municipality of Sabanalarga and moved to Medellín in 1988. In that city she began her artistic career, inspired by the referent of Colombian popular music Darío Gómez. In different journalistic spaces, the Colombian singer has spoken of the hard situation she had to live from a very young age due to her taste for music and the context of violence in which she grew up in the south of the department, very affected by the presence of guerrillas for decades.

Since 1996 she has released several solo albums and some collaborations with artists of the genre such as El Charrito Negro, Giovanny Ayala, Jimmy Gutiérrez and the aforementioned Darío Gómez. During her career she has been recognized as "La reina de la música popular" (The queen of popular music) due to her extensive musical career. In her more than twenty-year career, Henao has shared the stage with renowned Colombian and international artists such as Los Tigres del Norte, Ana Gabriel, Maelo Ruiz, Helenita Vargas, Diomedes Díaz y Tormenta, among many others. In 2015 she recorded the song "La reina y el rey" with Darío Gómez, composed by Argemiro Jaramillo, which achieved commercial and critical recognition in Colombia.

Henao has achieved four nominations to the Premios Nuestra Tierra in the categories of Best Female Performance and Best Female Artist.

Henao's musical story inspired Caracol Televisión to produce a self-titled biographical television series.

== Discography ==
- Por la puerta grande (1994)
- Única (2001)
- Reina sin rey (2005)
- Mujeres y despecho (2005)
- Mi historia (2018)
