= Anónima =

- Genre: Drama
- Written by: Juan Andrés Granados, Juan Francisco Domínguez, Gerardo Pinzón, Andrea López J.
- Directed by: Andrés Bierman; Carlos Mario Urrea
- Starring: Verónica Orozco; Juan Esteban Aponte
- Country of origin: Colombia
- Original language: Spanish
- No. of seasons: 1
- No. of episodes: 73

Production
- Executive producer: Agustín Restrepo
- Production locations: Bogotá, Colombia

Original release
- Network: RCN Televisión
- Release: November 17, 2015 – March 8, 2016

Anónima, is a Colombian television series produced by Sony Pictures Television and Teleset for RCN Televisión. The series stars Verónica Orozco as Victoria and Juan Esteban Aponte as Eric. The series originally aired from November 17, 2015 to March 8, 2016.

== Plot ==
The series follows the story of a woman who decides to stay in silence rather than confess their love, a decision that will eventually leave her in prison. After 10 years in prison, he will emerge as a different person, with an exterior hardened and focused on leaving the past behind. Fate, however has other plans and after a tragic turn of events should assume the role of the boy's mother which will take her to the underworld if you want to survive.

== Cast ==
- Verónica Orozco as Victoria Cuartas
- Juan Esteban Aponte as Eric
- Julián Arango as Ramiro Rocha
- Sebastián Martínez as Carlos Luna
- Miguel González as Joaquín
- Julio Pachón as Bermúdez
- Jordana Issa as Rincón
- Michelle Manterola as Martha
- Leandro López as Patrullero Montero
- Camila Murcia as Juanita
- Viña Machado as Sofía Linares
- Carlos Serrato as Orlando
- Alex Quiroga as Neyder Vanegas
- Susana Rojas as Yudy Mariño
- Paula Barreto as Betina Serrano
- Manuel Sarmiento as Gonzalo Zapata
- Martín Karpan as Fernando Osorio
- Sebastián Caicedo as Camilo Valderrama
- Fernando de la Pava as Jaime Villanueva
- Sara Pinzón as Victoria Cuartas Almanza
- Tatiana Arango as Jessica Lozano
- Andrés Felipe Martínez as General Ricaurte
- Santiago Alarcón as Maximiliano “Max” Velandia
- Mario Guerrero as Santiago Rocha Pardo
- Wilson Rangel as Rodríguez
- Hector Lucumi as Carlos
- Carolina Cuervo as Susana
- Juliana Galvis as Claudia Pardo de Rocha
- Valentina Gómez as Patricia Triviño
- Isabella García as Martina Velandia Suarez
- Giancarlo Mendoza as Darío Hoyos
- Juan Carlos Arango as Manuel Cáceres
- Natasha Klauss as Adriana
- Jenni Osorio as Ramona
