= Leonardo Krys =

Leonardo Krys (1944–2009) was a travel agent whose 1991 heart attack aboard a Lufthansa flight prompted U.S.-based airlines to install Automated External Defibrillators, or AED, on their planes.

== Heart attack ==
On November 30, 1991, Krys boarded a Lufthansa 747 in Miami, headed to Frankfurt, Germany. About an hour out, he suffered the symptoms of a cardiac infarction. The crew did not make an unscheduled landing and landed in Germany after a 10 hours flight. Upon landing, the plane was met by an ambulance which transported Krys to a hospital. At the hospital, the doctors concluded that Krys had indeed suffered a heart attack.

Krys and his wife argued that Lufthansa's crew acted negligently in responding to the symptoms displayed by Mr. Krys and thus aggravated the damage to his heart. They won a lawsuit against Lufthansa in Miami federal court which the 11th Circuit Court of Appeals upheld. Later the United States Supreme Court refused to hear the airline's appeal arguing that the incident should have been classified as an accident, per the Warsaw Convention, capping his payout.

The result of this suit prompted the airlines to review their safety manuals, including portable defibrillators and training the crew on how to use them.

== Life ==
Leo (as he was known by his friend and family) was born in Argentina, and moved with his family to Miami, USA in the late 1970s, due to the local economical and political situation.

He owned a travel agency at the time of the heart attack, but the health crisis spurred a midlife career switch to acting. He acted in Telemundo telenovelas, local theater, an episode of America's Most Wanted (as an Israeli searching for his son's killer), several independent films and in Latin pop star La India's video, Traicion, as a priest.

One of Krys' son, Sebastian, is a four-time American Grammy winner and eight-time Latin Grammy Awards producer and mixer (as of 2011)

Leonardo Krys died of a heart attack in Miami, on March 14, 2009.
