= List of RCN Televisión telenovelas and series =

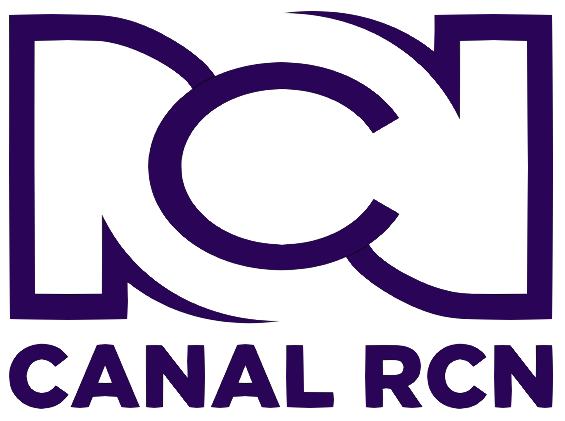

The following is a list of telenovelas and television series produced by RCN Televisión.

== 1980s ==
Year	Title	Ref.
1980	Cusumbo	
1980	La decisión de Camila	
1980	El ritmo a tu vida	
1980	Los Remansos	
1980	El amar y el querer	
1981	La flor de Cristina	
1981	Los Guadales	
1981	Llorando por amor	
1982	No tengo dinero para darte	
1982	Las flores de mi camino	
1982	Me llevaras en ti	
1982	Quiere ser mi amante	
1983	La corazonada	
1983	Hojas al viento	
1983	El Barcino	
1983	Luna roja	
1983	Como me haces falta	
1984	El Taita	
1984	Mamá pobreta	
1984	Casa brava	
1985	La cautiva	
1985	Cascabel	
1985	Camino cerrado	
1986	Vidas trocadas	
1986	Los dueños del poder	
1986	La espada de papel	
1986	Hojarasca	
1986	La intrusa	
1986	Destinos cruzados (co-produced with Colombiana de Televisión)	
1986	La espada y la pared	
1987	Vampiromanía	
1987	Mi sangre aunque plebeya	
1987	Dejémonos de vainas (1987–1991, produced by Coestrellas from 1984 to 1987 and later from 1992 to 1998)	
1987	Me estás haciendo falta	
1988	Garzas al amanecer	
1988	Te quiero pecas	
1988	El visitante	
1989	Azúcar (1989–1991)	
1989	Los colores de la fama	

== 1990s ==
Year	Title	Ref.
1990	Vanessa	
1990	La vorágine	
1990	La casa de las dos palmas	
1990	Laura por favor	
1991	María	
1991	Espumas	
1991	Lo que no perdona Dios	
1991	Pasiones peligrosas	
1992	Inseparables	
1992	Amor sin fronteras (co-production with Venevisión)	
1992	Puerta Grande	
1992	Oki Doki	
1993	La potra Zaina	
1993	La otra raya del tigre	
1994	Café, con aroma de mujer	
1994	Momposina	
1994	O todos en la cama	
1994	La Tele	
1995	Eternamente Manuela	
1995	Sabor a limón	
1995	Los cuentos de Bernardo Romero	
1995	Cara o sello: Dos rostros de mujer	
1995	Oro	
1995	Victoria	
1996	Guajira	
1996	Ruta del destino	
1996	Pa'Machos	
1996	Los pícaros del calvario	
1997	Las Juanas	
1997	Hombres	
1997	La cara de la moneda	
1997	Yo amo a Paquita Gallego	
1998	Carolina Barrantes	
1998	La madre	
1998	Siguiendo el rastro	
1998	Expedientes	
1998	Así es la vida Etapa 1 (1998–2000)	
1999	Tan cerca y tan lejos	
1999	El Fiscal	
1999	Me llaman Lolita	
1999	Yo soy Betty, la fea	
1999	Francisco el Matemático (1999–2004)	

== 2000s ==
Year	Title	Ref.
2000	Tabú	
2000	Alicia en el país de las mercancías	
2000	Brujeres	
2001	Isabel me la veló	
2001	Pandillas, guerra y paz	
2001	Juan Joyita	
2001	Pobre Pablo	
2001	Amor sin remedio	
2001	El informante en el país de las mercancías	
2002	La lectora	
2002	El precio del silencio	
2002	Milagros de amor	
2002	El inútil	
2002	Noticias Calientes	
2002	Ecomoda	
2003	La costeña y el cachaco	
2003	Amor a la plancha	
2003	A.M.A. La Academia	
2003	Un ángel llamado azul	
2003	No renuncies Salomé	
2003	Retratos	
2003	Punto de giro	
2004	Al ritmo de tu corazón	
2004	Todos quieren con Marilyn	
2004	Las noches de Luciana	
2004	Me amarás bajo la lluvia	
2004	La viuda de la mafia	
2004	Amor de mis amores	
2005	Lorena	
2005	El pasado no perdona	
2005	Juegos prohibidos	
2005	Juego limpio	
2005	Los Reyes	
2005	Enigmas del más allá	
2006	Por amor	
2006	La hija del mariachi	
2006	Floricienta	
2006	Hasta que la plata nos separe	
2006	Merlina, mujer divina	
2006	En los tacones de Eva	
2006	¿De qué tamaño es tu amor?	
2006	Así es la vida	
2007	La marca del deseo	
2007	Marido a sueldo	
2007	Amas de casa desesperadas	
2007	Pura sangre	
2007	Zona rosa	
2007	Mujeres asesinas	
2008	Sin retorno	
2008	Los protegidos	
2008	El último matrimonio feliz	
2008	Aquí no hay quien viva	
2008	La dama de Troya	
2008	Novia para dos	
2008	Amor, mentiras y video	
2008	Súper pá	
2008	Valentino, el argentino	
2009	Verano en Venecia	
2009	El penúltimo beso	
2009	El fantasma del Gran Hotel	
2009	Las detectivas y el víctor	
2009	Las trampas del amor	
2009	Cuando salga el sol	
2009	Inversiones el ABC	
2009	Regreso a la guaca	
2009	Pandillas, guerra y paz II	
2009	Amor en custodia	
2009	El Capo	

== 2010s ==
No.	Title	Season	Writer(s)	Executive Producers(s)	Original release		Ref.
No.	Title	Season	Writer(s)	Executive Producers(s)	First aired	Last aired	Ref.
2010
1	Rosario Tijeras	1 season, 60 episodes	Jorge Franco	Angela Pulido Serrano	8 February 2010	28 July 2010	
2	Amor sincero	1 season, 156 episodes	Fabiola Carrillo; Rodrigo Holguín; Fernando Gaitán; Mónica Agudelo	Juan Carlos Erazo	22 February 2010	12 October 2010	
3	A corazón abierto	2 seasons, 169 episodes	Fernando Gaitán	Jaime Sánchez Cristo	26 April 2010	11 August 2011	
4	Chepe Fortuna	1 season, 151 episodes	Miguel Ángel Baquero; Eloísa Infante	Consuelo Santamaría	26 July 2010	23 June 2011	
5	La Pola	1 season, 200 episodes	Juan Carlos Peréz		13 September 2010	27 July 2011	
6	A mano limpia	2 seasons, 233 episodes	Andrea Castillo	Luis Eduardo Chacón	22 November 2010	10 July 2013	
7	El man es Germán	4 seasons, 305 episodes	Juan Manuel Cáceres Niño; Héctor Alejandro Moncada	Lizette Torres; Ricardo Coral Dorado	20 December 2010	20 December 2019	
2011
8	Doña Bella	1 season, 88 episodes	Daniella Castagno	Verónica Pimstein; Armando Barbosa; Federico Castillo	25 April 2011	19 September 2011	
9	El Joe, la leyenda	1 season, 119 episodes	Andrés Salgado; Natalia Ospina	Guillermo Restrepo	30 May 2011	20 December 2011	
10	Correo de inocentes	1 season, 125 episodes	Clara María Ochoa	Ana Piñeres	28 June 2011	24 January 2012	
11	3 milagros	1 season, 70 episodes	Miguel Otero Silva	Frank Scheuermann	20 September 2011	19 January 2012	
12	La Traicionera	1 season, 267 episodes	Adrián Suar	Óscar Guarín	8 November 2011	21 December 2012	
2012
13	La mariposa	1 season, 60 episodes	Gerardo Reyes	Diana Sarmiento	6 January 2012	22 March 2012	
14	¿Dónde está Elisa?	1 season, 107 episodes	Pablo Illanes	Leonardo Aranguibel; Fernando Barbosa; Jaime Sánchez Cristo	12 March 2012	21 December 2012	
15	Pobres Rico	1 season, 120 episodes	Guillermo Restrepo	Germán Araque	7 May 2012	24 January 2013	
16	Historias clasificadas	1 season, 60 episodes		Stella Morales G.	8 May 2012	2 August 2012	
17	Corazones blindados	1 season, 139 episodes	Rafael Noguera; Ana María Londoño	Andrea Marulanda	3 September 2012	1 April 2013	
18	Casa de reinas	1 season, 51 episodes	Miguel Ángel Baquero	Nana Velásquez	19 November 2012	23 January 2013	
2013
19	Allá te espero	1 season, 135 episodes	Adriana Suárez; Javier Giraldo	Yalile Giordanelli	21 January 2013	30 September 2013	
20	Amo de casa	1 season, 169 episodes	Guido Jácome	Genoveva Rey	28 January 2013	4 October 2013	
21	Entérese	1 season, 80 episodes	Juan Carlos Troncoso	Kepa Amuchastegui	11 February 2013	2013	
22	Tres Caínes	1 season, 80 episodes	Gustavo Bolívar	Hugo León Ferrer	4 March 2013	18 June 2013	
23	Chica vampiro	1 season, 120 episodes	Marcela Citterio	Nelly Ordóñez	14 May 2013	5 November 2013	
24	Retrato de una mujer	1 season, 125 episodes	Mónica Agudelo	Óscar Guarín	12 June 2013	13 September 2013	
25	La prepago	1 season, 61 episodes	Jorge Franco	Juan Pablo Posada	19 June 2013	31 October 2013	
26	El día de la suerte	1 season, 132 episodes	Eloisa Infante	Consuelo Santamaría; Miguel Ángel Baquero	12 August 2013	25 March 2014	
27	Graduados	1 season, 257 episodes	Sebastián Ortega	Nelson Martinez	18 September 2013	16 October 2014	
28	Comando élite	1 season, 84 episodes	Germán Castro Caycedo	Claudia Faciolince	1 October 2013	21 February 2014	
29	Alias el Mexicano	1 season, 79 episodes	Gerardo Reyes	Óscar Guarín	5 November 2013	17 March 2024	
30	Mamá también	1 season, 105 episodes	Ana María Londoño	Agustin Restrepo	18 November 2013	28 April 2014	
2014
32	La playita	1 season, 147 episodes	Juan Manuel Cáceres; Héctor Moncada	Miriam Gómez Ariza	24 February 2014	3 July 2014	
31	Dr. Mata	1 season, 58 episodes	Nubia Barreto	Miriam Gómez Ariza	18 March 2014	16 June 2014	
33	Contra las cuerdas	1 season, 90 episodes	Tristán Bauer; Juan Pablo Domenech	Luis Eduardo Jiménez Padilla	29 April 2014	20 May 2015	
34	El estilista	1 season, 84 episodes	Nubia Barreto	Jaime Sánchez Cristo	17 June 2014	17 October 2015	
35	Un sueño llamado salsa	1 season, 90 episodes	Guido Jácome; Felipe Forero; Alejandro Torres	Amparo López	6 October 2014	13 January 2015	
36	El laberinto de Alicia	1 season, 92 episodes	Tania Cárdenas; Santiago Ardila	Juan Ortiz Osorno	20 October 2014	9 March 2015	
37	Secretos del paraíso	1 season, 182 episodes	Mónica Agudelo	Jaime Sanchez Cristo	10 November 2014	21 August 2015	
2015
38	Diomedes, el cacique de la junta	1 season, 196 episodes	Herney Luna; Maria Cecilia Vázquez	Yalile Giordanelli	13 January 2015	29 October 2015	
39	¿Quién mató a Patricia Soler?	1 season, 101 episodes	Ana Fernanda Martinez; Carlos Fernandez de Soto; José Fernando Perez	Felipe Aguilar; Rodolfo Hoyos	9 February 2015	30 July 2015	
40	Sala de urgencias	2 seasons, 140 episodes	Jörg Hiller; Claudia F. Sánchez; Johanna Gutiérrez	Gloria Vega	12 March 2015	29 December 2016	
41	Lady, la vendedora de rosas	1 season, 78 episodes	Felipe Cano	Andrea Marulanda; Juan Pablo Posada	16 June 2015	17 November 2015	
42	Las santísimas	1 season, 121 episodes	Luis Felipe Salamanca	Tony Navia	24 August 2015	22 June 2016	
43	Celia	1 season, 80 episodes	Andrés Salgado; Paul Rodríguez	Nelson Martínez	5 October 2015	8 February 2016	
44	Anónima	1 season, 73 episodes	Andrés Biermann; Carlos Mario Urrea	Agustín Restrepo	18 November 2015	8 March 2016	
2016
45	Contra el tiempo	1 season, 127 episodes	Albatros González	Claudia Facio-Lince	26 January 2016	10 August 2016	
46	Azúcar	1 season, 96 episodes	Rodolfo Gómez; Mauricio Navas; Conchita Ruíz	Óscar Guarín	9 March 2016	12 August 2016	
47	Bloque de búsqueda	1 season, 74 episodes	Jörg Hiller	Angélica Guerra	26 April 2016	29 August 2016	
48	Hilos de sangre azul	1 season, 126 episodes	Patricia Lara Salive; Ana Maria Londoño; Carolina Barrera	Luis Eduardo Jiménez	16 August 2016	21 February 2017	
49	En la boca del lobo	1 season, 80 episodes	William C. Rempel	Amparo Gutiérrez	16 August 2016	26 November 2016	
50	Todo es prestao	1 season, 79 episodes	Jorge Alí Triana	Madeleine Contreras; Juan Diego Villegas	30 August 2016	25 November 2016	
51	Las Vega's	1 season, 72 episodes	Héctor Alejandro Moncada; Cecilia Pérez; Laura Bolaño	Jaime Sánchez Cristo	26 October 2016	10 February 2017	
52	La ley del corazón	2 seasons, 277 episodes	Mónica Agudelo	Jorge Giraldo	28 November 2016	22 April 2019	
2017
53	El Comandante	1 season, 102 episodes	Moisés Naím	Luis Eduardo Jiménez; Andrea Marulanda; Juan Pablo Posada	30 January 2017	7 July 2017	
54	Francisco el Matemático: Clase 2017	1 season, 73 episodes	Diego Vivanco; Ana María Parra; Sandra Rita Paba	Jorge Giraldo	13 February 2017	4 May 2017	
55	Venganza	1 season, 129 episodes	Tania Cárdenas Paulsen; Conchita Ruiz	Fernando Barbosa; Leonardo Aranguibel	6 May 2017	11 September 2017	
56	No olvidarás mi nombre	1 season, 60 episodes	Fernando Gaitán; Nubia Barreto	Juan Carlos Erazo	13 June 2017	13 September 2017	
57	Pambelé	1 season, 80 episodes	Alberto Salcedo Ramos; A.F. Cortés	Andrés Libreros; Claudia Valencia	10 July 2017	3 November 2017	
58	Hermanos y hermanas	1 season, 78 episodes		Silvia Durán	12 September 2017	10 January 2018	
59	La luz de mis ojos	1 season, 77 episodes	Gerardo Pinzón; Claudia Rojas; Alonso Sánchez Baute	Madeleine Contreras; Juan Diego Villegas	19 September 2017	14 January 2018	
2018
60	Garzón vive	1 season, 90 episodes	Juan Carlos Pérez	Madeleine Contreras	15 January 2018	1 June 2018	
61	Paraíso Travel	1 season, 72 episodes	Jorge Franco; Juan Manuel Rendón	Angelica Guerra	15 January 2018	4 May 2018	
62	Nadie me quita lo bailao	1 season, 55 episodes	Guido Jácome	Unai Amustastegui; Nelson Martínez	7 May 2018	19 July 2018	
63	La esquina del diablo	1 season, 70 episodes	Covadonga Espeso; Jordi Arencón	Claudia Facio Lince	10 September 2018	16 November 2018	
64	Manual para ser feliz	1 season, 90 episodes	Esther Feldman; Alejandro Maci	Agustín Restrepo	22 October 2018	4 January 2019	
2019
65	Tormenta de amor	1 season, 74 episodes	Andrés Cortés; Raúl Prieto; Rosa Clemente	Claudia Facio Lince	10 July 2019	16 December 2019	
66	Enfermeras	2 seasons, 429 episodes	Víctor Cantillo; Luis Carlos Sierra	Ana María Pérez	23 October 2019	12 August 2022	

== 2020s ==
No.	Title	Season	Writer(s)	Executive Producers(s)	Original release		Ref.
No.	Title	Season	Writer(s)	Executive Producers(s)	First aired	Last aired	Ref.
2020
1	Pa' quererte	2 seasons, 137 episodes	Juan Andrés Granados	Yalile Giordanelli	7 January 2020	7 May 2021	
2	Confinados	1 season, 10 episodes	Lucho Sierra	Ana María Pérez Martínez	24 May 2020	26 July 2020	
3	Verdad oculta	1 season, 62 episodes	Verónica Triana; Pedro Miguel Rozo	Jorge Ali Triana; Rodrigo Triana	1 July 2020	28 September 2020	
2021
4	Lala's Spa	1 season, 80 episodes	Juan Manuel Cáceres; Héctor Alejandro Moncada	Andrés Santamaría	6 April 2021	2 August 2021	
5	Café con aroma de mujer	1 season, 92 episodes	Adriana Suárez	Yalile Giordanelli	10 May 2021	24 September 2021	
6	La nieta elegida	1 season, 72 episodes	Julio Jiménez; Iván Martínez	Nana Velásquez	20 January 2021	22 March 2021	
2022
7	Te la dedico	1 season, 107 episodes	Juan Andrés Granados	Ana María Pérez Martínez	8 February 2022	15 July 2022	
8	Hasta que la plata nos separe	1 season, 88 episodes	Juan Carlos Pérez Flores	Yalile Giordanelli	20 February 2022	22 March 2022	
9	Dejémonos de Vargas	1 season, 74 episodes	Guido Jácome	Federico Castillo	13 July 2022	16 July 2023	
10	Leandro Díaz	1 season, 82 episodes	Rafael Noguera; Cecilia Percy; Juan Sebastián Granados	Ana María Pérez Martinez	19 September 2022	28 February 2023	
2023
11	Manes	3 seasons, 18 episodes	Daniel Ayala López & Diego Ayala López	Daniel Ucrós Londoño and Juan Pablo Posada	15 February 2023	19 March 2025	
12	Ana de nadie	1 season, 94 episodes	Jimena Romero; Gilma Peña	Yalile Giordanelli	1 March 2023	25 July 2023	
13	Tía Alison	1 season, 63 episodes	Héctor Moncada	Andrés Santamaría	26 July 2023	31 October 2023	
14	Rigo	1 season, 99 episodes	Cesar Betancur	Ana María Pérez Martínez	9 October 2023	15 April 2024	
2024
15	Rojo carmesí	1 season, 81 episodes	Fernando Gaitán; Adriana Suárez	Juan Pablo Posada; Consuelo González Cuéllar	16 April 2024	14 August 2024	
16	La sustituta	1 season, 51 episodes	Julio Jiménez; Iván Martínez	Luis Eduardo Jiménez	28 June 2024		
17	Betty, la fea: la historia continúa	3 seasons, 30 episodes	Marta Betoldi; Juan Carlos Pérez; César Betancur	Juan Pablo Posada; Yalile Giordanelli	19 July 2024	TBA	
18	Darío Gómez: el rey del despecho	1 season, 100 episodes	Rafael Noguera; Juan Sebastián Granados; Cecilia Percy; Silvia León	Ana María Pérez Martínez	9 October 2024	19 February 2025	
2025
19	La hija del mariachi	1 season, 92 episodes	Gerardo Pinzón Ochoa; Carolina López Rodríguez	Ana María Pérez Martínez	11 June 2025	31 October 2025	
20	Simplemente Alicia	1 season, 19 episodes	Marta Betoldi; Esteban del Campo Bagu	Juan Pablo Posada; Daniel Ucrós; Alexander Marín	5 November 2025		
2026
21	Las de siempre	1 season, 91 episodes	Liliana Guzmán; Paola Arias; Rodrigo Holguín	Ana María Pérez Martínez	13 January 2026	29 May 2026	
22	Pa' seguirte queriendo	TBD	Juan Andrés Granados	Juan Pablo Posada; Yalile Giordanelli	21 July 2026	TBA	

== See also ==
- RCN Televisión
