= Café con aroma de mujer =

Café con aroma de mujer may refer to:

- Café con aroma de mujer (1994 TV series), a Colombian telenovela
- Café con aroma de mujer (2021 TV series), a Colombian television series based on the 1994 series
