= Alejandra Borrero =

Colombian actress

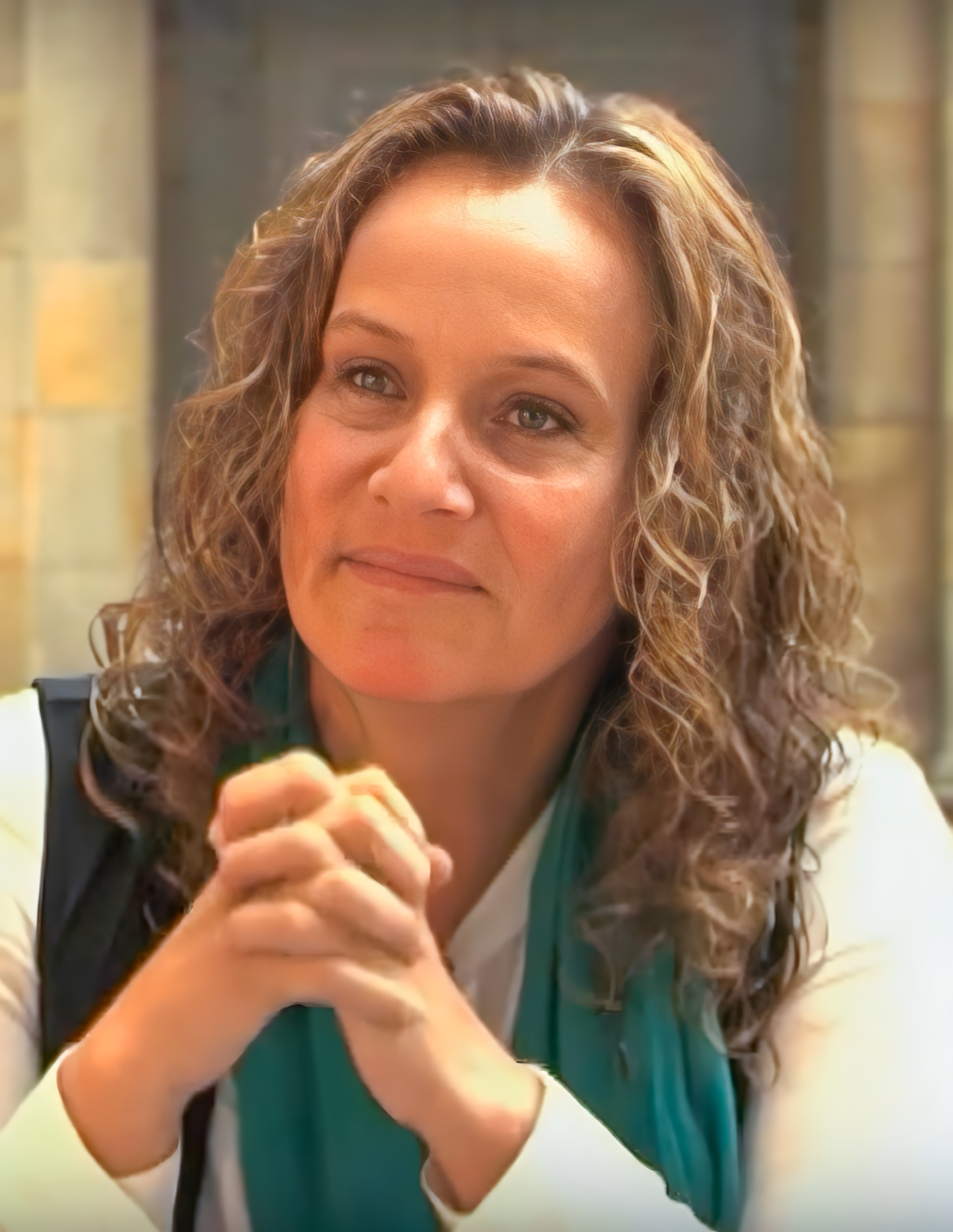
- Borrero in 2014
- Born: María Alejandra Borrero Saa; April 25, 1962 (age 63); Popayán, Colombia
- Occupation: Actress
- Years active: 1986–present

María Alejandra Borrero Saa (born April 25, 1962) is a Colombian actress of film, stage and television.

== Personal life ==
Born of a traditional family from Popayán, Borrero establishes a liberal life, where she manifests to be very different from the traditional standards which involved her in the world of acting.

In 1998, after years of work in Colombian television, she came out as lesbian, an issue that according to her was not well accepted by the country and caused her depression for four years. She decided to move to the United States, questioning how in Colombia there was no respect for difference. Four years after announcing her homosexuality, she returned to her homeland and agreed to interview her sexual orientation, concluding that little by little, society was already accepting sexual diversity. In 2015, she stated that she had a relationship with Katrin Nyfeler, is engaged to get married.

== Filmography ==
=== Television ===
Year	Production	Character	Notes
2018	La ley del corazón 2	Adela Zambrano	
2016	Azúcar	Tía Raquel	Antagonist
2014	Conflicto en la televisión	N/A	Presenter
2013	Protagonistas de nuestra tele (3ª Temporada)	N/A	Jury
2013	Allá te espero	Magnolia Jaramillo de Restrepo	Antagonist
2012	CM&	N/A	Guest Host
2012	Protagonistas de nuestra tele (2ª Temporada)	N/A	Jury
2012	Puro teatro	N/A	Presenter, in the framework of the International Festival of Bogotá
2010	Protagonistas de Nuestra Tele	N/A	Jury
2010	A corazón abierto	Helena Cavalier	Special and recurring cast
2009	Amor en custodia	Paz Delucci/ Mónica Martínez	Protagonist
2008	El último matrimonio feliz	Antonia Palacio	Protagonist
2008	Tiempo final	Irene	
2007	Mujeres asesinas	Emilia – La Carnicera	Protagonist
2007	Pura sangre	Genoveva Lagos	
2006	La hija del mariachi	Raquel de Guerrero	Main cast
2005	Merlina, mujer divina	Soledad Carbó	
2004	Protagonistas de novela 3, El juicio final	N/A	Teacher
2003	Punto de giro	Estefanía Braun / Katherine Braun	Protagonist-Antagonist
2002	Vale todo	Helena Roitman	
2001	Esta boca es mía	Ella misma	Presenter
2001	Solterita y a la orden	Amalia	
1999	Me muero por ti	Julia	
1999	Francisco el matemático	Adriana Pineda	Co-Protagonist
1999	El Fiscal	Tatiana Toledo de Valencia	
1998	Amores como el Nuestro	Carmen Elvira	
1997	Perfume de agonía	Helena	Protagonist
1996	Hombres	María Fernanda Acosta combers Padilla	Co-Protagonist
1996	La otra mitad del sol	Diana	Protagonist
1994	Café, con aroma de mujer	Lucía Sandoval Portocarrero de Vallejo	Main antagonist
1993	Crónicas de una generación trágica	Doña Francisca Villanova	Series
1993	La maldición del paraíso		
1992	Espérame al final		
1992	Escalona	Ana Belén	
1992	La María	La madre	
1989	LP loca pasión	Laura	
1989	Azúcar	Caridad Solaz	Protagonist-Antagonist
1988	Al final del arco iris		
1988	Décimo grado		
1987	La otra cara de la moneda		
1987	Las muertes ajenas		
1987	Marcela		
1987	Por amor		
1987	Cuentos del domingo		Dramatizados

=== Film ===
Year	Production	Character	Notes
2014	Gente de bien	María Isabel	Film selected in the week of the critique of the Cannes festival
2014	Anina	Voz rectora	Animated film
2009	Poker	Jefe de la Mafia	
2009	Del amor y otros demonios		
2008	Miradas urgentes	Alicia	
2007	El amor en los tiempos del cólera	Doña Blanca	
2007	Hacia la oscuridad	Marta Gutiérrez	
2005	Rosario Tijeras	Doña Ruby	
2005	Cuando rompen las olas	Helena	
2001	Bolívar soy yo	vicepresidenta	
1999	Soplo de vida	mujer en las escaleras	
1997	La deuda	Eugenia Alfaro	
1987	La noche que nos visitó Sonia		
1986	La madremontes		
1986	Debajo de las estrellas		

=== Theater ===
Year	Work	2022	Las Manuelas: Una Noche para Siempre
2014-5	Ella en Shakespeare		
2013-5	Pharmakon		
2013	Menáge à Trois		
2013	A 2.50 la Cuba Libre		
2012-4	Cinco mujeres un mismo trato		
2012	Habitación 3.3.3		
2012	Pharmakon		
2011	Pharmakon		
2010	A 2.50 la Cuba Libre		
2008	Bajo el volcán		
2008	Pharmakon		
2006	A la sombra del volcán		
2003-6	Frankie y Johnny al claro de luna		
2002	Púrpura		
1995	La Clepsidra		
