= 26th TVyNovelas Awards =

2008 Mexican TV awards

- Date: April 27, 2008
- Location: Forum Mundo Imperial, Acapulco, Guerrero
- Hosted by: Yuri

Highlights
- Most awards: Destilando amor (10)
- Most nominations: Destilando amor Pasión (12)

Television/radio coverage
- Network: Canal de las Estrellas

The 26th TVyNovelas Awards were an academy of special awards to the best soap operas and TV shows. The awards ceremony took place on April 27, 2008 in the Mundo Imperial Forum, in Acapulco, Guerrero. The ceremony was televised in Mexico by Canal de las Estrellas.

Yuri hosted the show. Destilando amor won 10 awards, the most for the evening, including Best Telenovela. Other winners Lola, érase una vez and Pasión won 2 awards each.

== Summary of awards and nominations ==
Telenovela	Nominations	Awards
Destilando amor	12	10
Pasión	12	2
Yo amo a Juan Querendón	7	0
Lola, érase una vez	3	2
Muchachitas como tú	3	0
Bajo las riendas del amor	2	0

== Winners and nominees ==
=== Telenovelas ===
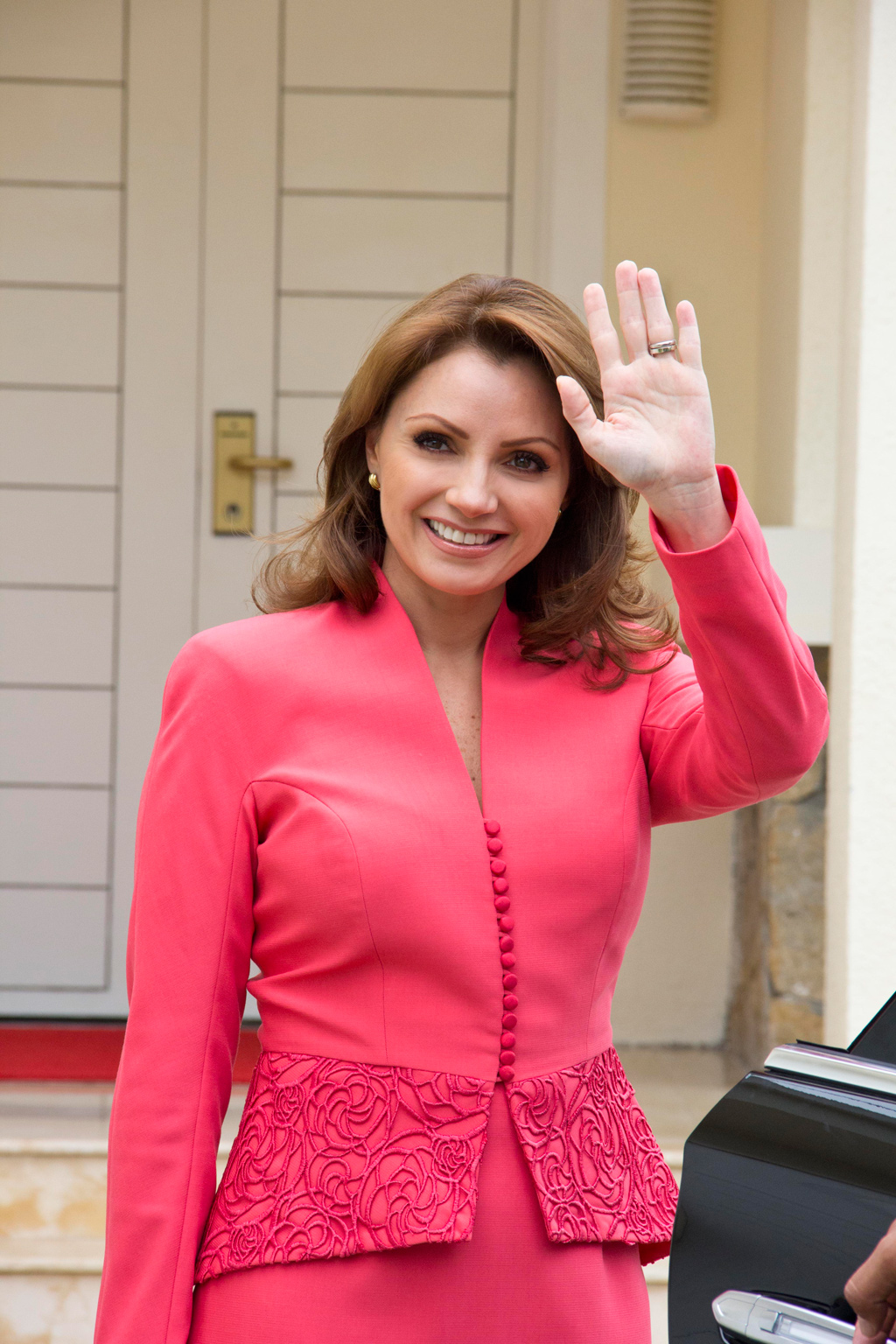
Angélica Rivera, winner for Best Actress.

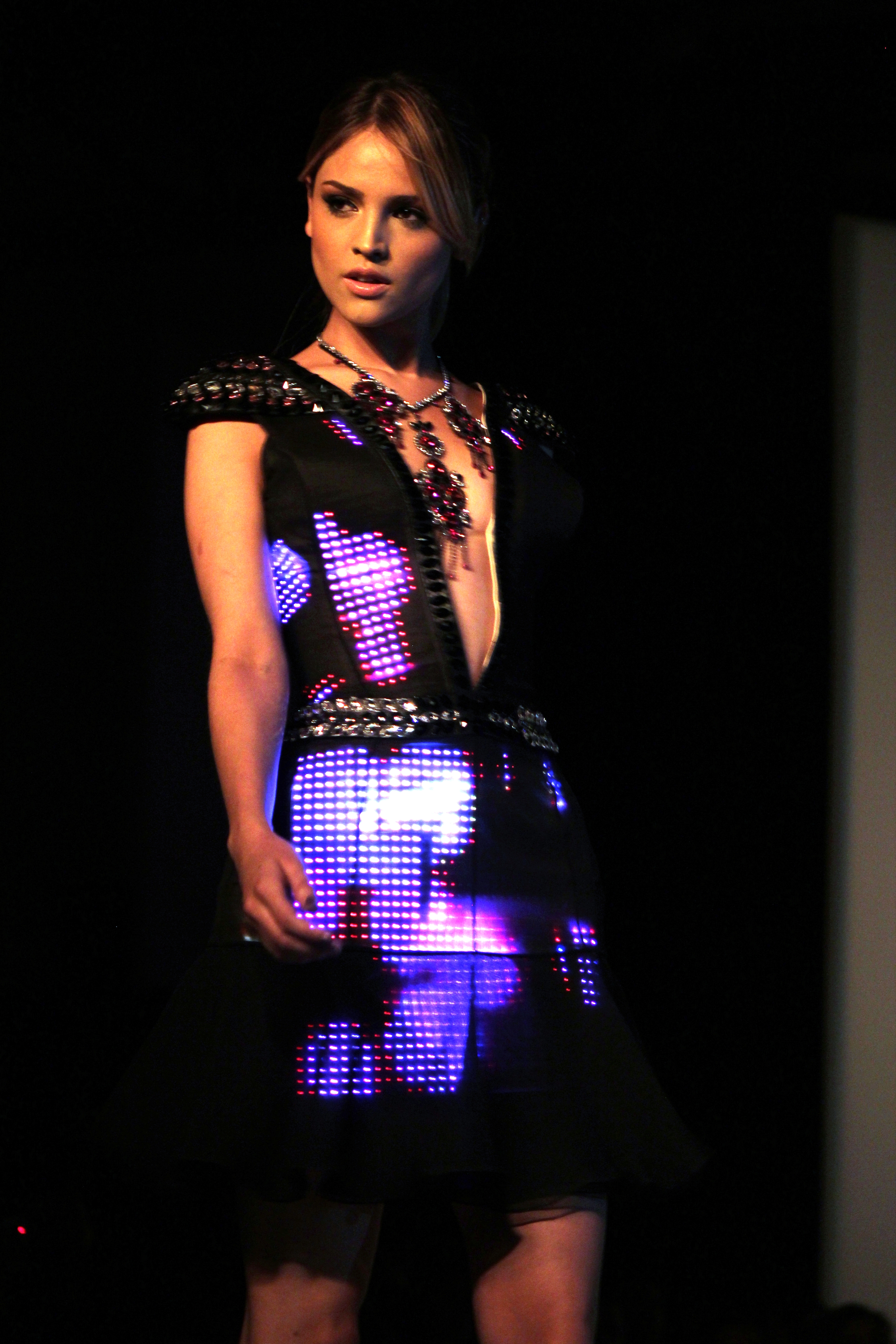
Eiza González, winner for Best Revelation.

Best Telenovela	Best Original Story or Adaptation
Destilando amor; Pasión; Yo amo a Juan Querendón	Fernando Gaitán, Kary Fajer and Gerardo Luna – Destilando amor; Gabriela Ortigoza, Antonio Abascal and Miguel Vallejo – Yo amo a Juan Querendón; María Zarattini – Pasión
Best Actress	Best Actor
Angélica Rivera – Destilando amor; Mayrín Villanueva – Yo amo a Juan Querendón; Susana González – Pasión	Eduardo Yáñez – Destilando amor; Eduardo Santamarina – Yo amo a Juan Querendón; Fernando Colunga – Pasión
Best Antagonist Actress	Best Antagonist Actor
Chantal Andere – Destilando amor; Adamari López – Bajo las riendas del amor; Daniela Castro – Pasión	Sergio Sendel – Destilando amor; Fabián Robles – Muchachitas como tú; José Elías Moreno – Pasión
Best Leading Actress	Best Leading Actor
Ana Martín – Destilando amor; Isela Vega – Pasión; Silvia Mariscal – Muchachitas como tú	Germán Robles – Pasión; Héctor Sáez – Bajo las riendas del amor; Julio Alemán – Destilando amor
Best Co-lead Actress	Best Co-lead Actor
Marisol del Olmo – Pasión; Martha Julia – Destilando amor; Sylvia Pasquel – Yo amo a Juan Querendón	Alejandro Tommasi – Destilando amor; Eugenio Bartilotti – Yo amo a Juan Querendón; Sebastián Rulli – Pasión
Best Direction	Best Direction of the Cameras
Miguel Córcega and Víctor Rodríguez – Destilando amor; Lily Garza and Mauricio Rodríguez – Yo amo a Juan Querendón; Mónica Miguel – Pasión	Ernesto Arreola – Destilando amor; Alejandro Frutos – Pasión; Vivian Sánchez Ross and Daniela Ferrer – Lola, érase una vez

=== Others ===
Best Child Actress or Actor	Best Series Made in Mexico
Octavio Ocaña – Lola, érase una vez; Danna Paola – Muchachitas como tú; Santiago Hernández – Plaza Sésamo	El Pantera; 13 miedos; S.O.S.: Sexo y otros secretos; ¿Y ahora qué hago?
Best Comedy Program	Best Variety Program
La familia P. Luche; Amor mío; Una familia de 10; Vecinos	Hoy; ¡Muévete!; Viva la mañana
Best Competitions Program	Best Restricted TV Program
Bailando por un sueño: Primer campeonato mundial de baile; Buscando a Timbiriche: La Nueva Banda; Los 5 magníficos	¡Es de noche! ... Y ya llegué; Derecho de admisión; Está cañón
Best Youth Program	Best Special Program
Incógnito; Pepsi Chart; WAX	Miguel Bosé desde el corazón de la tierra; 50 años de las telenovelas; Pedro Infante vive... El concierto

=== Special awards ===
- Revelation of the Year: Eiza González for Lola, érase una vez
- Special Recognition for Artistic Career: Joaquín Cordero
- Special Award for Teletón México: Fernando Landeros

=== Performers ===
Name(s)	Performed
Allisson Lozz; K-Paz de la Sierra	"No me supiste querer"
Eduardo Yáñez; Jorge Salinas; Pablo Montero	"Y me he eqivocado"
Eiza González	"Si me besas"
Emmanuel	"La chica de humo"
Fonseca	"Alma de hierro"
Mijares	"Bella"
Ninel Conde	"Ni un centavo"
Yuri	"Qué te pasa"
Yuri; Emmanuel; Mijares	"Toda una vida"
Yuri; Mijares	"Cuando baja la marea" "Uno entre mil"

=== Absent ===
People who did not attend the ceremony and were nominated in the shortlist in each category:

- Carla Estrada
- Eugenio Derbez (Luis Manuel Ávila, Bárbara Torres and Miguel Pérez received the award in his place)
- Isela Vega
- María Zarattini

== In Memoriam ==
- Antonio Aguilar
- Alfredo Ripstein
- Gerardo Alfaro
- Sergio Gómez
- Manuel Avila Camacho
- Alejandra Meyer
- Jorge Castro
- Zayda Peña
- Valentín Elizalde
- Emilio Carballido
- Francis García
- Pompin Iglesias
- Luis Demetrio
- Tito Bauche
- Alan Ledesma
- Pedro Knight
- Sergio Jiménez
- Trigo Figueroa
- Juan Jose Gurrola
- Monna Bell
- Jacqueline Voltaire
- Miguel Galván
