= Amor en custodia =

Amor en custodia may refer to:

- Amor en custodia (Argentine TV series), 2005
- Amor en custodia (Mexican TV series), 2005–2006, based on the above
- Amor en custodia (Colombian TV series), 2009
