= Hasta que la plata nos separe =

Television series

- Genre: Telenovela
- Created by: Fernando Gaitán
- Written by: Fernando Gaitán
- Directed by: Sergio Osorio
- Starring: Victor Hugo Cabrera; Marcela Carvajal
- Opening theme: Tu cariño es un castigo by Walter Martínez
- Country of origin: Colombia
- Original language: Spanish
- No. of episodes: 163

Production
- Production location: Bogotá
- Running time: 60 minutes
- Production company: RCN Televisión

Original release
- Network: RCN
- Release: May 22, 2006 – October 11, 2007

Related
- Hasta que el dinero nos separe

Hasta que la plata nos separe (English: Until Money Do[es] Us Part) is a Colombian telenovela created and written by Fernando Gaitán, starring Victor Hugo Cabrera and Marcela Carvajal. It is produced and broadcast by RCN Televisión from May 22, 2006 to October 11, 2007.

== Cast ==
=== Main ===
- Victor Hugo Cabrera as Rafael Méndez Rengifo
- Marcela Carvajal as Alejandra Maldonado Ricaurte
- Gustavo Ángel as Rubén Valenzuela Sáenz "El Tinterillo"
- Liliana González de la Torre as María Victoria "Vicky" Parra "La Pajarita"
- Katherine Porto as Susana Rengifo
- María Helena Doering as Rosaura Suárez de De la Peña
- Lincoln Palomeque as Nelson José Ospina "El Dandy"
- Constanza Duque as Rosario Maldonado
- Martha Isabel Bolaños as Claudia Bermúdez
- Álvaro Rodríguez as Vicente Chávez
- Joavany Álvarez as Carlos Arango "El Papeto"
- Ernesto Benjumea as Edgar Marino
- Mario Ruiz as Germán Ramírez
- Carlos Benjumea as Ismael Dueñas "El Bebé"
- Katherine Vélez as Isabel Duarte "La Generala"
- Ricardo Leguízamo as Efraín Álvarez "El Contacto"
- Carlos Serrato as Ramiro Jiménez
- Óscar Dueñas as Juanito Flórez "Trapito"
- Javier Gnecco as Dr. Gabriel Bernal
- Humberto Dorado as Jorge Maldonado
- Santiago Alarcón as Jaime Rincón
- Ana María Arango as Leonor Rengifo de Méndez
- Adriana Silva as Julieta Méndez
- César Mora as Don Gastón Parra
- Gustavo Angarita Jr. as Franklin Parra
- Fernando Solórzano as Giovanni Parra
- Margalida Castro as Azucena
- Pepe Sánchez as Alberto Manrique
- Vicky Hernández as Carmela Muñoz "Doña Bastantona"
- Valerie Domínguez as Marian Sajir
- Rosemary Bohórquez as Ruby
- Germán Escallón as "El poeta"
- Javier Gnecco Jr. as Eduardo De La Peña
- Diego Sarmiento as Spencer
- María Elvira Arango as Esperanza
- Carmenza Gómez as Doña Dolores
- Gustavo Angarita as Frank "Frankestein"
- Patrick Delmas as Michel
- Ricardo Vélez as Guillermo Soler
- Tatiana Rentería as Karen
- Jéssica Sanjuán as Mónica
- Juan Carlos Arango as Ramón
- Andrés Felipe Martínez as Rigoberto Martínez
- Laila Vieira as Carla Domínguez
- Jenny Vargas as Pilar
- Luis Fernando Salas as Tato Yerman
- Carolina Trujillo as Lariza

=== Recurring ===
- Carolina Ramírez as Rosario del Pilar Guerrero
- Mark Tacher as Francisco Lara
- Gregorio Pernía as Manuel "El Coloso" Rodríguez
- Mario Duarte as Vladimir "El Mil Amores" Fernando Molina

== See also ==
- List of RCN Televisión telenovelas and series
