= Manes (TV series) =

Colombian television series

- Genre: Romantic comedy Satire
- Based on: Hombres by Mónica Agudelo
- Developed by: Daniel Ayala López & Diego Ayala López
- Directed by: Mauricio Cruz
- Starring: Laura Londoño; Sebastián Carvajal; Natalia Jerez; Juan Pablo Urrego; Juan Manuel Restrepo; Simón Elías; Diego Cadavid; Brian Moreno; Variel Sánchez
- Country of origin: Colombia
- Original language: Spanish
- No. of seasons: 3
- No. of episodes: 18

Production
- Production location: Bogotá
- Production company: RCN Televisión

Original release
- Network: Amazon Prime Video
- Release: 15 February 2023 – 19 March 2025

Manes (English: Dudes) is a Colombian romance comedy satire television series produced by RCN Televisión for Prime Video, adapted by Daniel Ayala López and Diego Ayala López. It is based on the 1996 television series Hombres, created by Mónica Agudelo.

It stars Laura Londoño, Sebastián Carvajal, Natalia Jerez, Juan Pablo Urrego, Juan Manuel Restrepo, Simón Elías, Diego Cadavid, Brian Moreno, and Variel Sánchez. The series premiered on February 15, 2023, on Prime Video.

On March 19, 2024, the series was renewed for a second and third season, with the second season premiering on September 11 of the same year. The third season premiered on March 19, 2025.

== Plot ==
Billuka is a renowned fintech company created and co-managed by Julián and his friends: Ricardo, Simón, Santiago, Tomás, Daniel, and Mafe. Antonia, the daughter of a prominent businessman, arrives in Colombia hoping to start over. When Julián meets Antonia, it's love at first sight. Subsequently, Julián finds himself embroiled in a series of conflicts between love and business.

== Cast ==
=== Main Cast ===
- Laura Londoño as Antonia Miranda
- Sebastián Carvajal as Julián Quintana
- Natalia Jerez as María Fernanda "Mafe" Acosta
- Juan Pablo Urrego as Daniel Rivera
- Juan Manuel Restrepo as Simón García (Season 1)
- Simón Elías as Tomás Holguín
- Diego Cadavid as Ricardo Jaramillo
- Brian Moreno as Santiago Herrera
- Variel Sánchez as Marcel Londoño
- Damián Alcázar as Mario "El Pulpo" Miranda (Season 1)

=== Recurring and Guest Cast ===
- Natalia Ramírez as Eugenia (Seasons 1-2)
- Sebastián Moya as Lucas Jaramillo
- Laura Archbold as Lina
- Marie Man as Paula
- Maria del Rosario as Ximena Lozano (Season 1)
- Alejandra Villafañe as Lorena (Season 1)
- Juanita Molina as Andrea (Season 1)
- Juan Fernando Sánchez as Jacobo Paz (Season 2)
- Angélica Blandón as Ana María de Herrera (Seasons 2-3)
- Laura Junco as Naty Pérez (Season 2)
- Rafaella Chávez as Teffy Ramírez (Season 2)
- Elizabeth Chavarriaga as Valentina (Season 2)
- Juanpa Zurita as Rodrigo de Regil (Season 3)
- Natalia París as Herself (Season 3)
- Mario Ruiz as Himself (Season 3)
- Mauricio Mejía as Jairo Mejía (Season 3)
- Ernesto Benjumea as Jaime Holguín (Season 3)
- Carmenza Cossio as Clara (Season 3)

== Episodes ==
| Series | Episodes | Originally released | |
| Series | Episodes | First released | Last released |
|---|---|---|---|
| 1 | 6 | 15 February 2023 | 15 February 2023 |
| 2 | 6 | 11 September 2024 | 11 September 2024 |
| 3 | 6 | 19 March 2025 | 19 March 2025 |

=== Season 1 (2023) ===
| No. overall | No. in season | Title | Original release date |
|---|---|---|---|
| 1 | 1 | "Us guys" (Así somos los Manes) | 15 February 2023 |
| 2 | 2 | "Contemporary Dilemmas" (Dilemas contemporáneos) | 15 February 2023 |
| 3 | 3 | "Sex and its risks" (El sexo y sus compliques) | 15 February 2023 |
| 4 | 4 | "Money issues" (El problema de la plata) | 15 February 2023 |
| 5 | 5 | "Age and immaturity" (La edad y la inmadurez) | 15 February 2023 |
| 6 | 6 | "Committing and its sacrifices" (El compromiso y sus sacrificios) | 15 February 2023 |

=== Season 2 (2024) ===
| No. overall | No. in season | Title | Original release date |
|---|---|---|---|
| 7 | 1 | "Honesty and egoism" (La honestidad y el egoísmo) | 11 September 2024 |
| 8 | 2 | "Exclusivity and infidelity" (La exclusividad y la infidelidad) | 11 September 2024 |
| 9 | 3 | "Vulnerability and attraction" (La vulnerabilidad y la atracción) | 11 September 2024 |
| 10 | 4 | "Heartbreak and its faces" (La tusa y sus caras) | 11 September 2024 |
| 11 | 5 | "Fears and masks, Pt. 1" (Los miedos y las máscaras Pt.1) | 11 September 2024 |
| 12 | 6 | "Fears and masks, Pt. 2" (Los miedos y las máscaras Pt.2) | 11 September 2024 |

=== Season 3 (2025) ===
| No. overall | No. in season | Title | Original release date |
|---|---|---|---|
| 1 | 1 | "Change and Evolution" (Cambio y Evolución) | 19 March 2025 |
| 2 | 2 | "Risking to win" (Arriesgar para ganar) | 19 March 2025 |
| 3 | 3 | "Coexistence and Sexism" (Conveniencia y machismo) | 19 March 2025 |
| 4 | 4 | "Face to face Communication" (Hablar de frente) | 19 March 2025 |
| 5 | 5 | "Quitting and Sacrificing" (Renuncias y Sacrificios) | 19 March 2025 |
| 6 | 6 | "What are we willing to?" (¿A qué estamos dispuestos?) | 19 March 2025 |
