= Javier Ramírez (entertainer) =

Colombian actor

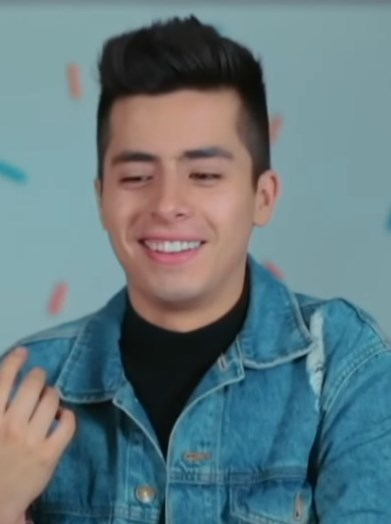
- Ramírez in February 2018
- Born: Javier Andrés Ramírez Espinosa; 19 September 1993 (age 32); Girardot, Cundinamarca, Colombia
- Occupations: Internet personality; vlogger; presenter; singer
- Years active: 2002–present

Javier Andrés Ramírez Espinosa (born 19 September 1993), commonly known as Javier Ramírez, is a Colombian internet personality, vlogger, actor, presenter and singer. Born in Girardot, Cundinamarca. He has been recognized in Colombia for his commercials on TV, as a presenter, participating in several telenovelas and series, as well as in Colombian films. His most outstanding performance was in the telenovela Mentiras perfectas as Matías Ucross.

He currently has 2 million subscribers on his official YouTube account.

== Personal life ==
In October 2017, he openly confirmed that he is gay through a video uploaded to his YouTube account.

== Selected filmography ==
| Year | Title | Roles | Notes |
|---|---|---|---|
| 2004 | Padres e Hijos | Camilo | TV series |
| 2005 | Decisiones | Various characters | TV series |
| 2010 | A corazón abierto | Joaquín / Samuel | TV series |
| 2011 | La Pola | Viviano | TV series |
| 2011 | Allá te espero | Pacho | TV series |
| 2013 | Mentiras perfectas | Matías Ucross | TV series |
| 2017 | La Nocturna | Raúl Saldarriaga | TV series |
| 2017 | El paseo de Teresa | Jairo Rico | Film |

== Awards and nominations ==
| Year | Award | Category | Works | Result |
|---|---|---|---|---|
| 2014 | 24th TVyNovelas Awards Colombia | Favorite Revelation of the Year | Mentiras perfectas | Won |
| 2014 | 24th TVyNovelas Awards Colombia | Favorite Supporting Actor of Telenovela | Allá te espero | Nominated |
