= No olvidarás mi nombre =

Colombian telenovel

- Genre: Telenovela
- Created by: Nubia Barreto
- Story by: Fernando Gaitán
- Directed by: Rodrigo Triana
- Starring: Iván López; Susana Rojas; Ana María Orozco
- Country of origin: Colombia
- Original language: Spanish
- No. of seasons: 1
- No. of episodes: 60

Production
- Production locations: Bogotá; Tolima
- Camera setup: Multi-camera

Original release
- Network: RCN Televisión
- Release: June 13 – September 13, 2017

No olvidarás mi nombre is a Colombian telenovela produced by Fernando Gaitán and written by Nubia Barreto for RCN Televisión. The series is starring Iván López as Sergio Aparicio, leading female role by Susana Rojas as Lucía Martinez and the return to television of Ana María Orozco.

== Plot ==
The series is a production based on real events and tells the story of Sergio Aparicio, a brilliant Bogota brokerage executive, who, at the end of an equine fair, meets a mysterious woman: Lucía Martínez. Both are in the place for different reasons, he to make money, and she, to talk with Monica Zapata about the real origin of the child Monica considers her son.

== Cast ==
- Iván López as Sergio Aparicio
- Susana Rojas as Lucía Martínez
- Ana María Orozco as Mónica Zapata
- Jairo Camargo as Leonardo Zapata
- Carmenza Gómez as Carmen Mojica
- Alina Lozano as Victoria Mera
- Michelle Rouillard as Miranda Londoño
- Ana Harlem Mosquera as Nieves Torres
- Hernán Méndez as Father Hipólito Castillo
- Andrés Toro as Martín Zapata
- Paula Estrada as Violeta Cortés
- Ricardo Mejía as Climaco Solano
- Laura Hernández as Beatriz Cadena
- Wildderman García as Ezequiel Martínez
- Mauricio Puentes as Abel Cadena
- Jorge Soto as César Palacios

== Colombia rating ==
Season	Timeslot (CT)	Episodes	First aired		Last aired	
Season	Timeslot (CT)	Episodes	Date	Viewers (millions)	Date	Viewers (millions)
1	Mon–Fri 9:00pm	60	June 13, 2017	8.5	September 13, 2017	7.1
