= Gente de bien =

2014 film

- Film poster
- Directed by: Franco Lolli
- Written by: Virginie Legeay; Franco Lolli; Catherine Paillé
- Starring: Bryan Santamaria; Carlos Fernando Perez; Alejandra Borrero
- Cinematography: Óscar Durán
- Edited by: Nicolas Desmaison; Julie Duclaux
- Production companies: Geko Films; Evidencia Films
- Distributed by: Ad Vitam Distribution
- Release dates: 18 May 2014 (Cannes); 18 March 2015 (France)
- Running time: 86 minutes
- Countries: Colombia; France
- Language: Spanish

Gente de bien (English: "Decent people") is a 2014 French-Colombian drama film directed and co-written by Franco Lolli. It was screened in the Critics' Week section at the 2014 Cannes Film Festival. It won the Grand Prix for Best Film at Film Fest Gent in 2014. On 2025 the movie had a local re-release amidst the celebration of the National Month of Colombian Cinema

== Cast ==
- Bryan Santamaria as Eric
- Carlos Fernando Perez as Eric's father
- Alejandra Borrero as Maria Isabel
