= Iván López (actor) =

Colombian actor

- Born: Iván Darío López; August 25, 1980 (age 45); Bogotá, Colombia
- Occupation: Actor
- Years active: 2006–present

Iván Darío López (August 25, 1980 in Bogotá, Colombia) is a Colombian television actor. He is best known for his telenovelas.

== Filmography ==
=== Film ===
Title	Year	Role	Notes
Pablo	2016	Julián	Debut film

=== Television roles ===
Title	Year	Role	Notes
La hija del mariachi	2006	Lalo	
El fantasma del Gran Hotel	2009	Amante de Paola	
Amor en custodia	2009	Nicolás Camacho	
A corazón abierto	2010–2011	Rafael Gómez	
La Pola	2010–2011	Simón Bolívar	
Allá te espero	2012	Samuel Fernández	
Secretos del paraíso	2013	Alejandro Soler	Lead role
La ley del corazón	2016–present	Nicolás Ortega	Lead role
No olvidarás mi nombre	2017	Sergio Aparicio	Lead role
Pambelé	2017	Cristóbal Román	Lead role
Testosterona Pink	2017	Daniel	

== Awards and nominations ==
Year	Award	Category	Work	Result
2010	Premios India Catalina	Revelation of the Year	Amor en custodia	Nominated
2010	TVyNovelas Award Colombia	Revelation of the Year of Telenovela or Series	Amor en custodia	Won
2014	TVyNovelas Award Colombia	Best Antagonist Actor in a Telenovela	Allá te espero	Nominated
2017	Premios India Catalina	Best Supporting Actor in a Telenovela or Series	La ley del corazón	Nominated
