= Testosterona Pink =

Colombian comedy web series

- Genre: Comedy drama
- Created by: Miguel Daza
- Written by: Héctor Chiquillo
- Country of origin: Colombia
- Original language: Spanish
- No. of seasons: 1
- No. of episodes: 9

Production
- Executive producers: Diana Manosalva; Ana Hernández
- Production company: Caracol Televisión

Original release
- Network: YouTube
- Release: 20 October – 14 December 2017

Testosterona Pink is a Colombian comedy web series created by Miguel Daza and produced by Caracol Televisión. Written by Héctor Chiquillo and produced by Diana Manosalva, and Ana Hernández. The series revolves around of Germán, played by Juan Carlos Messier, a homosexual who decides to return to heterosexuality.

== Cast ==
- Juan Carlos Messier as Germán
- Raúl Ocampo as Jerónimo
- Ana Wills as Natalia
- Carlos Hurtado as Alejandro
- Iván López as Daniel
- Alejandro Otero as Mariano

== Episodes ==
The season will consist of a total of 9 episodes.

No.	Title	Original release date	Length (minutes)
1	"Una amarga noche loca"	20 October 2017	6:58
Germán Antonio and Daniel Fernando go from bad to worse. A crazy party makes Germán risk what little he has and, what happens to Daniel. Fortunately, Daniel has the support of Natalia, that friend that every gay wants to have, the owner of a sex shop that has no filter at all, less if it is about sex toys. The only bright idea that occurs to him to save the life of his friend Daniel is to get him a roommate, but leaving everything in his hands may not be the most wonderful idea.
2	"De Jerónimo a Violeta"	25 October 2017	7:49
3	"Recuperando las buenas costumbres"	1 November 2017	9:10
4	"Y la reina de la casa es…"	9 November 2017	8:55
5	"Casete borrado junto a mi ex"	16 November 2017	8:07
6	"¿Anoche hice qué?"	23 November 2017	8:16
7	"La peor tusa"	30 November 2017	5:17
8	"Germán no se escapará de Matilda"	7 December 2017	7:48
9	"¿Qué pasará con Daniel y Germán?"	14 December 2017	8:25
