= Keller Wortham =

American actor and physician

- Born: February 18, 1976 (age 50); San Francisco, California, U.S.
- Education: Duke University (BA; BA); Georgetown University (MD)
- Occupations: Actor; physician

Keller Wortham (born February 18, 1976) is an American actor and physician known for appearing in English- and Spanish-language series.

== Early life ==
Native to San Francisco, Wortham spent much of his early life on the East Coast. He attended undergraduate at Duke University where he was a member of speak of the Devil with Aaron Scott Lazar. He went to medical school at Georgetown University in Washington, D.C.. He did his residency in internal medicine in Pittsburgh. He moved to Los Angeles to pursue his acting career.

== Career ==
Wortham's first major film role was in Now & Later in 2011, a film directed by Philippe Diaz. His first major television role was in Spanish-language series Allá te espero (2013). He played Esteban in a satirical telenovela Jane the Virgin (2014–2019). He appeared in a telenovela Sangre de mi tierra (2017–2018).

== Personal life ==
Wortham enjoys playing a piano.

== Selected filmography ==
Year	Title	Role	Footnote
2011	Now & Later	Bill	
2013	Allá te espero		
2014–2019	Jane the Virgin		
2017–2018	Sangre de mi tierra		
