= Laura De León Céspedes =

Colombian actress (born 1991)

Laura de León
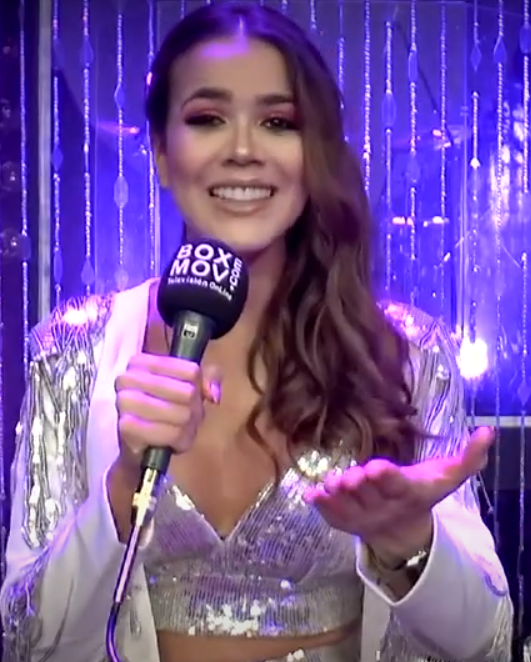
- Born: Laura Marcela De León Céspedes; January 19, 1991 (age 35); Cartagena, Colombia
- Education: Universidad Tecnológica de Bolívar
- Occupation: Actress
- Years active: 2012–present
- Known for: Pa'Quererte
- Height: 172 cm (5 ft 8 in)
- Spouse: Salomón Bustamante (m. 2021)

Laura Marcela de León Céspedes (born January 19, 1991) is a Colombian actress and model. She is best known for her television role in Pa' quererte.

De León was born in Cartagena. She has a degree in Communication studies. De León was elected Miss Bolívar, and in 2008 she participated in a local pageant.

De León is an actress, with performances in many TV shows, including La Playita, La Ley del Corazón, Leandro Díaz, and La luz de mis ojos.

De León is married to Salomón Bustamante and is the daughter of Martha Céspedes.

== Televisión roles ==
| Year | Title | Role | Notes |
|---|---|---|---|
| 2013 | El día de la suerte | | |
| 2013-2014 | Mamá también | Johanna Vargas | |
| 2014 | La playita | Soledad Martínez | |
| 2015 | Esmeraldas | Young Olga Guerrero | |
| 2016 | Todo es prestao | Lorena Serrani | |
| 2017 | La luz de mis ojos | Soledad Burgos | |
| 2018-2019 | La ley del corazón | Lucía Vallejo | Season 2 |
| 2020-2021 | Pa' quererte | Azucena Tinoco | |
| 2020 | La niña Julia | | |
| 2020 | Love motel | Alicia | |
| 2020 | Guía sexual | Ella | |
| 2022 | Primate | Karina | |
| 2022-2023 | Leandro Díaz | Matilde Lina | |
| 2024 | Rojo carmesí | Juana Levy | |
