= Rojo carmesí =

- Genre: Telenovela
- Created by: Fernando Gaitán
- Developed by: Adriana Suárez
- Written by: Adriana Suárez; Fernan Mauricio Rivera; Ana Fernanda Martínez
- Directed by: Víctor Cantillo; Catalina Hernández Zapata
- Creative director: Giovanni Gantiva
- Starring: Laura de León; Carlos Báez; Carolina Gaitán; Marcelo Dos Santos; Juan Guilera; Natasha Klauss; Kepa Amuchastegui; Germán Quintero
- Theme music composer: Simón Vargas; Juan Pablo Villamil; Juan Pablo Isaza; Martín Vargas
- Opening theme: "No Se Va" by Alejandro Savedra
- Composer: Oliver Camargo
- Country of origin: Colombia
- Original language: Spanish
- No. of seasons: 1
- No. of episodes: 81

Production
- Executive producers: Juan Pablo Posada Fernández; Consuelo González Cuéllar
- Editor: Silvia Ayala
- Production company: RCN Televisión

Original release
- Network: Canal RCN
- Release: 16 April – 14 August 2024

Rojo carmesí is a Colombian telenovela created by Fernando Gaitán. It aired on Canal RCN from 16 April 2024 to 14 August 2024. The series stars Laura de León, Carlos Báez and Carolina Gaitán.

== Cast ==
=== Main ===
- Laura de León as Juana Levy
- Carlos Báez as Jorge García
- Carolina Gaitán as Valeria Ruiz
- Marcelo Dos Santos as Alejandro Ruiz
- Juan Guilera as Marcelo
- Natasha Klauss as Paulina
- Kepa Amuchastegui as Khalil Fatat
- Germán Quintero as Bernardo Ruiz

=== Recurring and guest stars ===
- Ana Wills as Alexa
- Jeymmy Paola Vargas as Melisa
- Manuela Valdés as Daiana Vásquez
- María del Rosario as Lucrecia
- Alejandra Ávila as Lía Zúñiga
- Aida Morales as Nancy Quesada
- Gaston Velandia as Félix Forero
- Anderson Otalvaro as Daniel
- Nayra Castillo as Dora
- Jonathan Posada as Víctor
- Juan Pablo Posada as Mauricio
- Cristina Campuzano as Catalina
- Yuldor Gutierrez as Luis
- Natalia Durán as Helena
- Mya Durán as Gabriela

== Production ==
In June 2021, Adriana Suárez announced that she would write a telenovela based on a synopsis left by Fernando Gaitán before his death in 2019. In April 2023, Rojo carmesí was confirmed as the title of the telenovela. Filming began in January 2024.

== Ratings ==
Season	Timeslot (COT)	Episodes	First aired		Last aired		Avg. viewers (in points)
Season	Timeslot (COT)	Episodes	Date	Viewers (in points)	Date	Viewers (in points)	Avg. viewers (in points)
1	Mon–Fri 8:00 p.m. (1–4, 12–41); Mon–Fri 9:30 p.m. (5–11); Mon–Fri 10:30 p.m. (42–81)	58	16 April 2024	5.3	14 August 2024	3.2	3.2

== Episodes ==
No.	Title	Original release date	Colombia viewers (Rating points)
1	"El inicio de esta historia"	16 April 2024	5.3
2	"Comienza un sueño"	17 April 2024	4.3
3	"La verdadera historia"	18 April 2024	5.0
4	"El baile de la amistad"	19 April 2024	4.3
5	"Decisiones apresuradas"	22 April 2024	N/A
6	"El secreto fue descubierto"	23 April 2024	4.5
7	"Un pasado de infelicidad"	24 April 2024	4.3
8	"Una enfermedad devastadora"	25 April 2024	N/A
9	"El verdadero amor"	26 April 2024	3.6
10	"El desafortunado plan toma fuerza"	29 April 2024	3.7
11	"Negocios personales"	30 April 2024	N/A
12	"Brillando con su ausencia"	2 May 2024	4.0
13	"El último adiós"	3 May 2024	N/A
14	"Doble pérdida"	6 May 2024	3.8
15	"El dolor aumenta"	7 May 2024	4.1
16	"Empoderada y no derrotada"	8 May 2024	3.5
17	"El amor no se compra"	9 May 2024	N/A
18	"En caminos diferentes"	10 May 2024	N/A
19	"Cada vez más cerca"	14 May 2024	3.5
20	"El rojo es empoderamiento"	15 May 2024	N/A
21	"Se salió de control"	16 May 2024	N/A
22	"Dispuesta a recuperar lo suyo"	17 May 2024	N/A
23	"Impunidad y dolor"	20 May 2024	3.3
24	"Una somos todas"	21 May 2024	N/A
25	"Un camino juntos"	22 May 2024	N/A
26	"Dejando el pasado atrás"	23 May 2024	N/A
27	"Afrontando la realidad"	24 May 2024	N/A
28	"Una falsa coincidencia"	27 May 2024	4.1
29	"Siguen los negocios"	28 May 2024	4.0
30	"Llegó el anhelado momento"	29 May 2024	N/A
31	"Negocios, amores y rivalidades"	30 May 2024	N/A
32	"Una propuesta no deseada"	31 May 2024	N/A
33	"Aprovechando la oportunidad"	4 June 2024	N/A
34	"Un adiós y un regreso"	5 June 2024	N/A
35	"Nuevamente engañada"	6 June 2024	N/A
36	"Cerrando ciclos"	7 June 2024	N/A
37	"El corazón dolido"	11 June 2024	N/A
38	"Decisión tomada"	12 June 2024	N/A
39	"Inicia la batalla"	13 June 2024	N/A
40	"Una visita especial"	14 June 2024	3.6
41	"Cada uno por su lado"	17 June 2024	4.1
42	"Juana elige ser feliz"	18 June 2024	2.2
43	"Justicia divina"	19 June 2024	2.3
44	"Un amor que no se rinde"	20 June 2024	3.0
45	"Un desafortunado encuentro"	21 June 2024	2.3
46	"Un matrimonio fallido"	24 June 2024	2.8
47	"Juana vive un amargo momento"	25 June 2024	3.0
48	"Marcelo y Juana sellaron su amor"	26 June 2024	2.7
49	"La competencia del amor"	27 June 2024	2.7
50	"Juana se viste de empoderamiento"	28 June 2024	3.0
51	"Valeria se sale con la suya"	2 July 2024	3.7
52	"Las rojitas al rescate"	3 July 2024	2.8
53	"Un amor de otra época"	4 July 2024	2.7
54	"Una extraña coincidencia"	5 July 2024	2.7
55	"La sombra del pasado"	8 July 2024	2.7
56	"La encrucijada de Juana"	9 July 2024	3.5
57	"Juana enfrenta serios problemas"	10 July 2024	2.3
58	"El mal triunfó"	11 July 2024	2.7
59	"Un sentimiento de culpa"	12 July 2024	2.9
60	"Una señal de vida"	15 July 2024	2.7
61	"Dispuesto a una segunda oportunidad"	16 July 2024	2.7
62	"Una decisión irrevocable"	17 July 2024	2.4
63	"La traición se asoma"	18 July 2024	2.7
64	"¿Renace el amor?"	19 July 2024	2.8
65	"La maldad no tiene límites"	22 July 2024	3.3
66	"Entre la espada y la pared"	23 July 2024	3.0
67	"Todos los caminos conducen al amor"	24 July 2024	2.5
68	"Un amor para toda la vida"	25 July 2024	2.6
69	"Un juego de estrategias"	26 July 2024	3.0
70	"Poco a poco la verdad se asoma"	29 July 2024	2.6
71	"Nunca es tarde"	30 July 2024	2.7
72	"La justicia tarda pero llega"	31 July 2024	2.9
73	"Un mal presentimiento"	1 August 2024	2.9
74	"Una decisión equivocada"	2 August 2024	2.7
75	"Un desafortunado desenlace"	5 August 2024	2.8
76	"Todo está dicho"	6 August 2024	2.5
77	"Una verdad dolorosa"	8 August 2024	2.7
78	"No hay vuelta atrás"	9 August 2024	3.0
79	"Una poderosa alianza"	12 August 2024	3.3
80	"Unidas bajo un mismo propósito"	13 August 2024	3.0
81	"Una lección de amor"	14 August 2024	3.2
