= Salomón Bustamante Sanmiguel =

Colombian TV host

Salomón Bustamante Sanmiguel (born 1981) is a Colombian TV host.

== Career ==
Bustamante was born in Cartagena. He started his TV career in 2002 working for Canal RCN, in Estilo RCN and other shows.

In 2018 Bustamante participated in the reality show Reto 4 elementos. Later, Bustamante moved to work for rival network Canal RCN to host the TV morning show Muy Buenos Días.

== Personal life ==
Other than his TV appearances, Bustamante is a celebrity in Colombia for his Instagram account, and for being the husband of Laura de León.
