= Destilando Amor =

Mexican telenovela

- Genre: Telenovela
- Created by: Kary Fajer
- Based on: Café, con aroma de mujer by Fernando Gaitán
- Written by: Gerardo Luna
- Story by: Fernando Gaitán
- Directed by: Miguel Córcega
- Starring: Angélica Rivera; Eduardo Yáñez; Sergio Sendel; Chantal Andere; Ana Martín; Martha Julia; Alejandro Tommasi; Ana Patricia Rojo
- Theme music composer: Eduardo Murguía; Mauricio Arriaga
- Opening theme: "Por amarte" by Pepe Aguilar
- Ending theme: "Gaviota" by Angélica Rivera
- Country of origin: Mexico
- Original language: Spanish
- No. of seasons: 1
- No. of episodes: 171 (Original version); 170 (International version)

Production
- Executive producer: Nicandro Díaz González
- Producer: Antonio Arvizú
- Cinematography: Alejandro Frutos
- Editors: Susana Valencia; Pablo Peralta
- Camera setup: Multi-camera
- Running time: 45 minutes
- Production company: Televisa

Original release
- Network: Canal de las Estrellas
- Release: January 22 – September 16, 2007

Related
- Mundo de fieras; Pasión; Café con aroma de mujer (1994-1995); Cuando seas mía (2001-2002); Café con aroma de mujer (2021)

Destilando amor (English: Distilling Love) is a Mexican telenovela produced by Nicandro Díaz González for Televisa in 2007. It is the remake of the 1994 Colombian telenovela Café con aroma de mujer.

On Monday, January 22, 2007, Canal de las Estrellas started broadcasting Destilando amor weekdays at 9:00pm, replacing Mundo de fieras. The last episode was broadcast on Sunday, September 16, 2007 with Pasión replacing it the following day.

Starring Angélica Rivera, Eduardo Yáñez, Sergio Sendel, Chantal Andere, Ana Martín, Martha Julia, Alejandro Tommasi and Ana Patricia Rojo.

The telenovela received the TVyNovelas Award for Best Telenovela of the Year in the 2008 TVyNovelas Awards.

== Plot ==
Teresa Hernández (Angélica Rivera), whom everyone calls Gaviota, is a farm laborer who travels the country with her mother, Clara (Ana Martín), working the harvest. Every year, they return to Tequila, Jalisco for the reaping of the blue agave at the La Montalveña hacienda, owned by Don Amador (Joaquín Cordero), the patriarch of the Montalvos, a family with a long history of tequila production. At the beginning of the story, Don Amador knows his end is near and arrives to spend his final days in the land he so much loves.

When Don Amador dies, his family gathers for his funeral. His grandsons, Rodrigo (Eduardo Yáñez) and his cousin Aarón (Sergio Sendel), travel from London, where they are studying for a doctorate. The cousins grew up as brothers, but their grandfather's will awakens Aarón's ambition, as control of the family fortune will ultimately fall to the first son fathered by one of them. Aarón feels confident, knowing that Rodrigo has never been able to have sex; however, Gaviota's arrival in his life will change Rodrigo's destiny.

Upon meeting, Rodrigo and Gaviota feel the disturbing call of love for the first time; awakening a passion that dominates them and they both give themselves completely. Rodrigo promises Gaviota that he will return in a year when he finishes his doctorate to marry her. Shortly after, Gaviota discovers she is pregnant. Unaware of the size of the world, she decides to go to England to find Rodrigo. Tricked by a local photographer who promises her help, Gaviota falls into the hands of a gang of white slavers who send her to a brothel in Paris.

Gaviota escapes and begins traveling in search of the man she loves. Alone and without knowing the language, she relies on her faith and her feelings for him during difficult circumstances. Aided by an Italian man and a group of English nuns, she returns to Mexico to find a different life from the one she left behind, facing hardship and disappointment. She lives in a large city characterized by ambition, resentment, and deceit, which challenges the outlook she had when she began her journey in Distilling Love.

== Cast ==
=== Main ===
- Angélica Rivera as Teresa Hernández García "Gaviota" / Mariana Franco Villarreal
- Eduardo Yáñez as Rodrigo Montalvo Santos
- Sergio Sendel as Aarón Montalvo Iturbe
- Chantal Andere as Minerva Olmos
- Ana Martín as Clara "Clarita" Hernández García
- Martha Julia as Isadora Duarte Toledo
- Alejandro Tommasi as Bruno Montalvo Gil
- Ana Patricia Rojo as Sofía Montalvo Santos

=== Also main ===
- Julio Alemán as Roberto Avellaneda
- Martha Roth as Doña Pilar Gil de Montalvo
- José Luis Reséndez as Hilario Quijano
- Olivia Bucio as Fedra Iturbe de Montalvo
- Gustavo Rojo as Néstor Videgaray
- Irma Lozano as Constanza Santos de Montalvo
- Jaime Garza as Román Quijano
- Jorge Vargas as Felipe Montalvo Gil
- Jan as Patricio Iturbe
- Raúl Padilla Chóforo as Crispín Castaño
- Fernanda Castillo as Daniela Montalvo Santos
- Carlos de la Mota as James O'Brien
- Alicia Encinas as Bárbara de Torreblanca
- Miguel Galván as Carmelo
- Adriana Laffán as Ofelia de Quijano
- Archi Lanfranco as Benvenuto
- Mariana Ríos as Sanjuana Escajadillo
- Theo Tapia as Gaspar Torreblanca
- Rebeca Mankita as Colette
- Jacqueline Voltaire as Mother Felicity
- Joaquín Cordero as Don Amador Montalvo

=== Recurring and guest stars ===
- Sugey Ábrego as Nancy
- Sergio Acosta as Malagón
- Alejandro Aragón as Maximino Vallejo
- Kelchie Arizmendi as Eduvina
- Pedro Armendáriz Jr. as Irving Thomas
- Tony Balardí as Sócrates
- Rosángela Balbó as Josephine
- Marius Beigai as Hans Meinsdrucken
- Joana Benedek as Pamela Torreblanca
- César Bono as himself
- Rosita Bouchot as Flavia
- Julieta Bracho as Elvira
- Julio Camejo as Francisco de la Vega
- Arturo Carmona as Alfredo Loyola
- Juan Carlos Casasola as Lawyer Grajales
- Luis Couturier as Artemio Trejo
- Luis de Alba as Néstor
- Gabriel de Cervantes as Longoria
- Fernando de la Flor as Data entry clerk
- David del Real as Airplane pilot
- Rafael del Villar as Eugenio Ferreyra
- Hope Díaz as Teresa
- Edgardo Eliezer as Elvis
- Humberto Elizondo as Mr. de la Garza
- José Antonio Ferral as Plácido
- Laura Flores as Priscila Yurente
- Gabriela Goldsmith as Cassandra Santoveña
- Erik Guecha as Nelson
- Virginia Gutiérrez as Altagracia de Trejo
- Manuel "Flaco" Ibáñez as himself
- Salvador Ibarra as Lawyer Medina
- Rafael Inclán as Cordero
- Toño Infante as Gelasio Barrales
- José Julián as Singer
- Ricardo Kleinbaum as Lawyer López
- Manuel Landeta as Rosemberg
- Fabián Lavalle as Doctor
- Norma Lazareno as Nuria Toledo de Duarte
- Jaime Lozano as Rodeo presenter
- Hugo Macías Macotela as Arnulfo
- Rebeca Manríquez as Agripina
- Bibelot Mansur as Acacia
- Patricia Manterola as Erika Robledo
- Malillany Marín as Albertina
- Saraí Meza as Child Gaviota
- Rubén Morales as Lawyer Quintana
- Alma Muriel as Public prosecutor
- Felipe Nájera as Carlos
- Aleida Núñez as Presenter
- Juan José Origel as himself
- Claudia Ortega as Young Clara "Clarita" Hernández García
- Jorge Ortiz de Pinedo as Renato
- David Ostrosky as Eduardo Saldívar
- Adalberto Parra as Melitón
- Juan Peláez as Public prosecutor
- Yuliana Peniche as Margarita
- María Prado as Josefina "Jose" Chávez
- Luis Mario Quiroz as Paulino Tejeiros
- Silvia Ramírez as Lluvia Camargo
- Javier Ruán as Demetrio Urbán
- Nora Salinas as Karen
- María Sandoval as Woman
- Jorge Santos as TV journalist voice
- Julian Sedgwick as British newscaster
- Ricardo Silva as Rolando
- René Strickler as Alonso Santoveña
- Luis Uribe as Lorenzo Oñate
- Marco Uriel as Olavarría
- Roberto Vander as Ricardo Duarte
- Julio Vega as Lawyer Montesinos
- Ricardo Vera as Lawyer Soto
- Juan Verduzco as Father Cosme
- Hiram Vilchez as Leonel
- Pedro Weber "Chatanuga" as Othón Argüeyo
- Luis Xavier as Doctor
- Jorge Zamora as Sorcerer

== Original Motion Picture Soundtrack ==
The original motion picture soundtrack of the telenovela was released on April 3, 2007 by EMI Latin.

Track listing

1. "Por amarte (Tema de la telenovela Destilando amor)" - Pepe Aguilar
2. "Gaviota" - Gaviota
3. "La campirana (Rolitacampirana 4)"
4. "Llegando a ti" - Gaviota
5. "Esos Altos de Jalisco" - Gaviota
6. "Campo abierto (Rolitacampirana 3)"
7. "Esta triste guitarra" - Pepe Aguilar
8. "Penas del alma" - Gaviota
9. "Enamorándonos (0707DESVOXP1)"
10. "Cielo rojo" - Pepe Aguilar
11. "Música del campo (Rolitacampirana 1)"
12. "Corazoncito tirano" - Gaviota
13. "Échame a mí la culpa" - Pepe Aguilar
14. "Luz de luna" - Gaviota
15. "Ilusión de amarte (0107DESVOXP1)"
16. "El impedimento (1207DESORQS1)"
17. "Poder y soberbia (2007DESORQS1)"
18. "Gaviota (Versión Jalisciense)" - Gaviota

== Awards and nominations ==
Below is a listing of the most important awards and nominations received by the production:

Year	Award	Category	Nominee(s)	Result
2007	TV Adicto Golden Awards	Best Song	Destilando amor	Won
2007	TV Adicto Golden Awards	Best Leading Actress	Ana Martín	Won
2007	TV Adicto Golden Awards	Best Female Lead	Angélica Rivera	Won
2007	TV Adicto Golden Awards	Best Couple	Angélica Rivera; Eduardo Yáñez	Won
2007	TV Adicto Golden Awards	Best Character Design	Destilando amor	Won
2007	TV Adicto Golden Awards	Best Script	Kary Fajer; Gerardo Luna	Won
2007	TV Adicto Golden Awards	Best Locations	Destilando amor	Won
2007	TV Adicto Golden Awards	Best Mexican Telenovela	Destilando amor	Won
2007	TV Adicto Golden Awards	Special Award for Great; Telenovela of the Year	Destilando amor	Won
2008	TVyNovelas Awards	Best Telenovela	Nicandro Díaz González	Won
2008	TVyNovelas Awards	Best Actress	Angélica Rivera	Won
2008	TVyNovelas Awards	Best Actor	Eduardo Yáñez	Won
2008	TVyNovelas Awards	Best Antagonist Actress	Chantal Andere	Won
2008	TVyNovelas Awards	Best Antagonist Actor	Sergio Sendel	Won
2008	TVyNovelas Awards	Best Leading Actress	Ana Martín	Won
2008	TVyNovelas Awards	Best Leading Actor	Julio Alemán	Nominated
2008	TVyNovelas Awards	Best Co-lead Actress	Martha Julia	Nominated
2008	TVyNovelas Awards	Best Co-lead Actor	Alejandro Tommasi	Won
2008	TVyNovelas Awards	Best Original Story or Adaptation	Fernando Gaitán; Kary Fajer; Gerardo Luna	Won
2008	TVyNovelas Awards	Best Direction	Miguel Córcega; Víctor Rodríguez	Won
2008	TVyNovelas Awards	Best Direction of the Cameras	Ernesto Arreola	Won
2008	Bravo Awards	Best Telenovela	Nicandro Díaz González	Won
2008	Bravo Awards	Best Actress	Angélica Rivera	Won
2008	Bravo Awards	Best Actor	Eduardo Yáñez	Won
2008	Bravo Awards	Best Antagonist Actress	Chantal Andere	Won
2008	Bravo Awards	Best Antagonist Actor	Sergio Sendel	Won
2008	Latin ACE Awards	Best Soap	Destilando amor	Won
2008	Latin ACE Awards	Best Actor	Eduardo Yáñez	Won
2008	Latin ACE Awards	Best Supporting Actress	Ana Patricia Rojo	Won
2008	Latin ACE Awards	Best Direction	Miguel Córcega	Won
2010	Golden Awards Of The Decade	Best Leading Actress of the Decade	Ana Martín	Won
2010	Golden Awards Of The Decade	Best Mexican Telenovela of the Decade	Destilando amor	Won

- Recognition to 'Gaviota' for the international projection generated by the telenovela Destilando amor by spreading the culture of the most Mexican of beverages: tequila [Received by Angélica Rivera and Ana Martín (Date 2007)].
