= Diego Cadavid =

Colombian actor and cinematographer

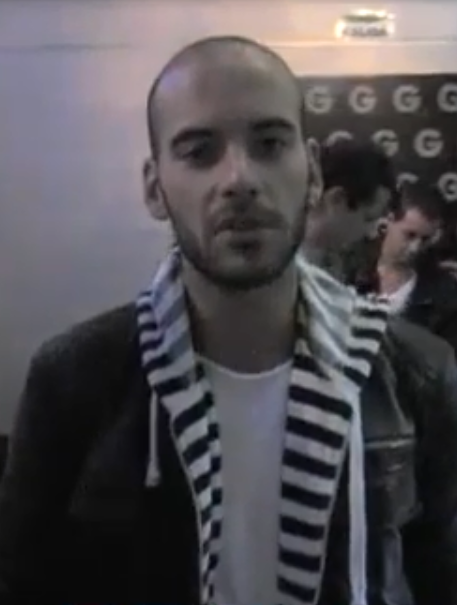
- Cadavid in 2011.
- Born: Diego Andrés Cadavid; December 8, 1978 (age 47); Medellín, Colombia
- Occupations: Actor, cinematographer, musician
- Years active: 1995-present

Diego Cadavid (born Diego Andrés Cadavid on December 8, 1978) is a Colombian actor, cinematographer and musician known for his roles in telenovelas.

He is currently dating Laura Archbold, a fellow Colombian actress who also appeared in the 2021 reboot of Café con aroma de mujer.

== Filmography ==
=== Film ===
| Year | Title | Role | Notes |
|---|---|---|---|
| 2002 | Te busco | José | |
| 2003 | El carro | Óscar | |
| 2006 | Soñar no cuesta nada | Lloreda | |
| 2006 | Dios los junta y ellos se separan | Wilman | |
| 2007 | Esto huele mal | Guzmán | |
| 2011 | El callejón | Gabriel | |
| 2011 | The Snitch Cartel | Pepe Cadena | Sequel to the telenovela |
| 2012 | La Lectora | Cachorro | |
| 2016 | El Empantanado: The Muddy | Juan Ignacio Gavaria | |

=== Television roles ===
| Year | Title | Role | Notes |
|---|---|---|---|
| 1995–2000 | Padres e hijos | Diego Montoya | |
| 1996 | Conjunto cerrado | Sarah's Husband | |
| 1997 | Yo amo a Paquita Gallego | Handsome Young Boy | Uncredited |
| 2000 | Se armó la gorda | Felipe Galán | |
| 2001 | Juan Joyita quiere ser Caballero | Roberto | |
| 2001 | Yo soy Betty, la fea | Román | 18 episodes |
| 2002 | María Madrugada | Juan Solo | |
| 2003 | Amor a la plancha | José Chipatecua | |
| 2004 | La saga, negocio de familia | Young Pedro Manrique / Young Manuel Manrique / Óscar Manrique | |
| 2004 | Mesa para tres | Alejandro "Alejo" Toro | |
| 2005 | El baile de la vida | Ricardo Zambrano | |
| 2006 | Las profesionales, a su servicio | Dante Quiróga | |
| 2007–2008 | Tiempo final | Almeida / Miguel / Ladrón | 3 episodes |
| 2008–2010 | El Cartel de los Sapos | Pepe Cadena | |
| 2008 | Sin retorno | Daniel | Episode: "Cruces" |
| 2010 | El encantador | Rolando Castaño | |
| 2011 | La Pola | Ambrosio Almeida | 24 episodes |
| 2013 | 5 viudas sueltas | Robin Ruíz | |
| 2014 | La ronca de oro | Álvaro José Sálas | 62 episodes |
| 2016 | Contra el tiempo | Leonardo Pérez | |
| 2017 | Ingobernable | Jaime Bray | 4 episodes |
| 2017–18 | Señora Acero | Julián Montero "Señor Romero" | Main role (season 4); guest role (season 5) |
| 2019 | El General Naranjo | Teniente Hector Talero | |
| 2021 | Café con aroma de mujer | Iván Vallejo | Main role |
| 2022 | Primate | Andrés | |
| 2024 | Darío Gómez: el rey del despecho | Darío Gómez | Main role |
| 2026 | Betty, la fea: la historia continúa | Román | Season 3 |
