= La luz de mis ojos =

Soap Opera

- Genre: Telenovela
- Written by: Gerardo Pinzón; Claudia Rojas
- Directed by: Jorge Alí Triana
- Creative director: Angélica Perea
- Starring: Laura de León; Édgar Vittorino
- Country of origin: Colombia
- Original language: Spanish
- No. of seasons: 1
- No. of episodes: 100

Production
- Executive producers: Juan Diego Villegas; Madeleine Contreras
- Production location: Córdoba
- Camera setup: Multi-camera

Original release
- Network: RCN Televisión
- Release: September 19, 2017 – January 14, 2018

La luz de mis ojos is a Colombian musical comedy-drama telenovela directed by Jorge Alí Triana for RCN Televisión. The series is written by Gerardo Pinzón and Claudia Rojas. It stars Laura de León and Édgar Vittorino as the titular characters.

== Plot summary ==
Soledad is a young woman who, despite not seeing, sings and dances with her soul because she carries the music of the Colombian Caribbean in her veins. However, she is the victim of her mother's contempt for an unforeseen event a few years ago and her dream of becoming a porro singer. For his part, Vicente, who is committed to his cousin Amira Rebecca, will have to make a difficult decision since true love has arisen with Soledad. However, Amira will do everything in her power to prevent him from canceling the marriage since she and her mother are interested in having all the money in the family, so he will resort to a false pregnancy. Finally, Soledad and his baby fruit of the love with Vicente will be who will pay the consequences of the bad decisions of his mother and of the family of Vicente as this will make the love between them becomes impossible.

== Cast ==
- Laura de León as Soledad Burgos
- Édgar Vittorino as Vicente Bula Chaid
- Majida Issa as Faride Chaid
- Daniela Tapia as Amira Rebeca Bula
- Tahimi Alvariño as Delfina Ricardo
- José Lombana as Adahir Lamprea
- Lucas Zaffari as Silvino Bula Chadid
- Brian Flaccus as Juan Abel
- Gaby Garrido as Romina Paternina
- Katherine Vélez as Guillermina "Mema" Chaid
- Johan Rivera as Pacho Mogolla
- Amanda Peter as Soledad Burgos
- John Alex Castillo as Crescencio Constantino
- Rodrigo Brand as Vicente
- Brittany Falardeau as Amira Rebeca Bula
- Libby Brien as Teresita Pretel
- Susana Torres as Evangelina Chaid
- Juan Carlos Messier as Eduardo Bula
- Orlando Lamboglia as David Bula
- Emerson Rodríguez as Silvino Bula Chaid
- María Eugenia Arboleda as Dominga
- Philip Hersh as Dr. Márquez
- Salvo Basile as Fuad Chaid
- Mimí Anaya as Cecilia
