= Darío Gómez: el rey del despecho =

Colombian biographical drama television series

- Genre: Biographical
- Based on: Mis verdades eternas by Darío Gómez & Olga Lucía Arcila Araque
- Written by: Rafael Noguera; Juan Sebastián Granados; Cecilia Percy; Silvia León
- Directed by: Lucho Sierra; Juan Carlos Mazo; Juan Pablo Posada
- Starring: Diego Cadavid; Yuri Vargas
- Composer: Oliver Camargo
- Country of origin: Colombia
- Original language: Spanish
- No. of seasons: 1
- No. of episodes: 100

Production
- Executive producer: Ana María Pérez Martínez
- Editor: Adriana Falla
- Production company: RCN Televisión

Original release
- Network: Amazon Prime Video
- Release: 9 October 2024 – 19 February 2025

Darío Gómez: el rey del despecho is a Colombian biographical drama television series produced by RCN Televisión. It tells the story of singer and composer Darío Gómez, played by Diego Cadavid, based on the book Mis verdades eternas written by Gómez and Olga Lucía Arcila Araque. The series premiered on Amazon Prime Video on 9 October 2024.

== Cast ==
- Diego Cadavid as Darío Gómez
  - Julián Zuluaga as young Darío
- Yuri Vargas as Olga Lucia Arcila
  - María José Vargas as young Olga
- Tatiana Ariza as Otilia
- Juan Pablo Barragán as Julio Gómez
  - Felipe Franco as young Julio
- Julio Sánchez Cóccaro as Albeiro "Cuerdita”
- Camila Rojas as Piedad Gómez
  - Maria Fernanda Duque as young Piedad
- Mila Martinez as Adelfa
- Ella Becerra as Abigail Zapata
- Rodolfo Silva as Horacio Arcila
- Aída Morales as Berenice de Arcila
- Luis Eduardo Arango as Rafael Mejía
- Víctor Hugo Trespalacios as Marco Aurelio Gomez
- Jairo Camargo as Gabriel Jaime
- Alejandro Tamayo as Alfredo
- Ricardo Vesga as Fidel Gómez
- Jim Muñoz as Mario Arango
- Laura Junco as Blanca Ligia
- Susana Rojas as Silvia Arcila
  - Michell Orozco as young Silvia
- Paula Castaño as Rosangela Gómez
- Melissa Cáceres as Adriana
- Ana María Sánchez as Libia
- Elizabeth Chava as Luz Dary Gómez
- Lina Castrillón as Mónica Restrepo

== Production ==
Filming began on 20 June 2024 and concluded in December of that year.

== Release ==
Darío Gómez: el rey del despecho premiered internationally on Amazon Prime Video on 9 October 2024, with five new episodes being released weekly. In Colombia, the series made its broadcast television premiere on Canal RCN on 27 January 2025.

== Awards and nominations ==
Year	Award	Category	Nominated	Result	Ref
2025	India Catalina Awards	Best Telenovela	Darío Gómez	Nominated	
2025	India Catalina Awards	Best Screenplay	Rafael Noguera, Cecilia Percy, Juan Sebastián Granados & Silvia León	Nominated	
2025	India Catalina Awards	Best Lead Actress	Yuri Vargas	Nominated	
2025	India Catalina Awards	Best Lead Actor	Diego Cadavid	Nominated	
2025	India Catalina Awards	Best Supporting Actor	Juan Pablo Barragán	Nominated	
2025	India Catalina Awards	Best Newcomer Actor or Actress	Felipe Franco	Nominated	
2025	Produ Awards	Best Contemporary Telenovela	Darío Gómez	Nominated	
2025	Produ Awards	Best Lead Actress - Contemporary Telenovela	Yuri Vargas	Nominated	
2025	Produ Awards	Best Lead Actor - Contemporary Telenovela	Diego Cadavid	Won	
2025	Produ Awards	Best Supporting Actor - Contemporary Telenovela	Juan Pablo Barragán	Won	
2025	Produ Awards	Best Directing - Superseries or Telenovela	Juan Carlos Mazo & Luis Carlos Sierra	Won	
2025	Produ Awards	Best Screenplay - Superseries or Telenovela	Rafael Noguera, Cecilia Percy, Juan Sebastián Granados & Silvia León	Nominated	
