= Allá te espero =

2013 Colombian telenovela

- Created by: Adriana Suárez; Javier Giraldo
- Directed by: Herney Luna
- Starring: Mónica Gómez; Keller Wortham; Sebastián Martínez; Alejandra Borrero; Ana Wills; Carlos Benjumea; Ana María Estupiñán; Valentina Rendón; Andrea Guzmán; Javier Ramírez
- Opening theme: Me fui by Gina Savino
- Country of origin: Colombia
- Original language: Spanish
- No. of episodes: 171

Production
- Producers: Flor Angela Devia; Yalile Giordanelli
- Production locations: Bogotá, Colombia; New York City, United States
- Production company: RCN Televisión

Original release
- Network: RCN
- Release: 21 January – 30 September 2013

Allá te espero (Wait for Me) is a 2013 Colombian telenovela produced and aired by RCN Televisión.

== Cast ==
- Mónica Gómez - Rosa María Restrepo Jaramillo
- Keller Wortham - David Schroeder
- Sebastián Martínez - Alex Montoya
- Alejandra Borrero - Magnolia Jaramillo de Restrepo
- Carlos Benjumea - Nazario Restrepo
- Valentina Rendón - Cecilia Restrepo Jaramillo
- Ana Wills - Sarah Visbal Schroeder
- Andrea Guzmán - Berenice Ortiz
- Luis Fernando Salas - Leonardo
- Ilja Rosendahl - Thomas
- Diego Sarmiento - Jose
- Ana María Estupiñán - Juana "Juanita" Salazar Restrepo
- Javier Ramírez - Francisco Javier "Pacho" Salazar Restrepo
- Carmenza Gómez - Rubiela Jaramillo
- Patrick Delmas - Phillipe
- Elkin Díaz - Félix Cascavita
- Juan Pablo Franco - Aurelio Salazar
- Juan Sebastián Parada - Michael Montoya Restrepo
- Lincoln Palomeque - Javier Linero
- Morella Zuleta - Norma
- Iván López - Samuel Fernández
- Cristina Campuzano - Amelia Patiño
- Carlos Camacho - Guido Ramírez
- Carlos Manuel Vesga - Álvaro Jaramillo
- Javier Gnecco - Gabriel Fernández
- Alberto Pujol - Silvio
- Humberto Dorado - Guillermo Visbal
- Bebsabe Duque - Maribel Rondón
- Gloria Zapata - Leonor de Visbal
- Jeimy Paola Vargas - Dora
- Maria Vanedi - María Guadalupe "Lupe" Aguilar
- Joavany Alvarez - Luis
- Giancarlo Mendoza - Nicolás Cascavita
- Adriana Silva - Paola
- Rodrigo Brand - Rilh
- Juan Luís Abisambra - Martín
- Guillermo Blanco - Danilo
- Rodolfo Valdés - René
- Alejandro Martínez - Jerónimo Castillo
- Diego León Hoyos - Israel
- Alberto Saavedra - Don Picasso/Octavio Jaramillo
- Ana Lucia Silva- Susana
- Sandra Monica Cubillos - Marina
- Ramsés Ramos - Omar Hernández

== International broadcasts ==
- United States: MundoFox
- Puerto Rico: MundoFox
- Ecuador: TC Televisión
- Paraguay: El Trece
- Panama: NEXtv
- Peru: ATV
- Venezuela: Venevisión
- Honduras: VTV
- Bolivia: Bolivisión
- Dominican Republic: Antena Latina
- South Africa: DStv
