= Leandro Díaz (TV series) =

Colombian biographical drama television series

- Genre: Biographical
- Based on: Leandro by Alonso Sánchez Baute
- Written by: Rafael Noguera; Cecilia Percy; Juan Sebastián Granados
- Directed by: Juan Carlos Mazo; Víctor Cantillo
- Starring: Silvestre Dangond; Laura De León
- Composer: Oliver Camargo
- Country of origin: Colombia
- Original language: Spanish
- No. of seasons: 1
- No. of episodes: 82

Production
- Executive producer: Ana María Pérez Martinez
- Editor: Silvia Ayala
- Production company: RCN Televisión

Original release
- Network: Canal RCN
- Release: 19 September 2022 – 28 February 2023

Leandro Díaz is a Colombian biographical drama television series produced by RCN Televisión. It tells the story of vallenato music composer Leandro Díaz, played by Silvestre Dangond, based on the book Leandro written by Alonso Sánchez Baute. The series aired from 19 September 2022 to 28 February 2023.

== Cast ==
=== Main ===
- Silvestre Dangond as Leandro Díaz
  - Abel Villa as Child Leandro
- Laura De León as Matilde Lina
- Viña Machado as María Ignacia Díaz Ospino
- Aida Bossa as Erótida Duarte
- Johan Rivera as Reinaldo Ramos
- Beto Villa as Toño Salas
- Diego Vásquez as Onofre Duarte
- Mario Espitia as Arturo Díaz

=== Recurring and guest stars ===
- John Bolívar as Chico Bolaños
- George Slebi as Moisés Cohen
- Antonio Jiménez
- José Chehab
- Carlos Andrés Villa
- Guillermo Vives as Ernesto Ángulo
- Yenifer González
- Edinson Salazar
- Breiner Minota
- Limedes Molina
- Jorge Oñate
- Anggy Pérez
- Ilain Contreras
- Ricardo Lapeira
- David Eduardo Díaz
- Mauro Andrade
- Juan Maya
- Sebastián Parejo
- Jair Romero as Pello Mestre
- Armando Castro
- Carmenza Gómez as Remedios Duarte
- Paula Castaño as Tomasa Díaz
- Daniela Tapia as Magdalena Malagón
- Marciano Martínez as Jose Luis Díaz
- Emilia Ceballos
- Emerson Rodríguez
- Víctor Hugo Ruíz as Julio Pantoja
- María Laura Quintero as Gala Pantoja
- Cristian Villamil as Mauricio Solórzano
- Antonio Cantillo as Laureano Duarte

== Episodes ==
No.	Title	Original release date	Colombia viewers (Rating points)
1	"Leandro Díaz conoce a Matilde Lina"	19 September 2022	6.8
2	"Leandro es rechazado por su padre y hermano"	20 September 2022	7.4
3	"Leandro recibe duro castigo de su padre"	21 September 2022	7.3
4	"Onofre lleva a Leandro al médico"	22 September 2022	7.4
5	"La casa de Leandro queda destruida tras una tormenta"	23 September 2022	7.3
6	"Leandro compone su primera canción"	26 September 2022	7.9
7	"Leandro conoce a Magdalena"	27 September 2022	7.2
8	"Leandro se da su primer beso con Magdalena"	28 September 2022	8.3
9	"Magdalena y Leandro consuman su amor en el río"	29 September 2022	8.2
10	"Leandro presenta a Magdalena como su novia"	30 September 2022	8.7
11	"Leandro sufre por Magdalena"	3 October 2022	8.0
12	"Leandro se reconcilia con Magdalena"	4 October 2022	7.6
13	"Leandro se va a vivir con Magdalena"	5 October 2022	8.2
14	"Leandro se va de Los Pajales"	6 October 2022	7.9
15	"Leandro consigue acordeonero"	7 October 2022	8.9
16	"Magdalena le es infiel a Leandro"	10 October 2022	8.4
17	"Magdalena le confiesa a Leandro su infidelidad"	11 October 2022	8.2
18	"Leandro sufre una dolorosa pérdida"	12 October 2022	8.0
19	"Arturo se une a Leandro"	13 October 2022	8.1
20	"Gala conoce a la familia de Arturo"	14 October 2022	8.5
21	"Leandro cantó La Diosa Coronada"	18 October 2022	8.8
22	"La viruela afecta a Leandro"	19 October 2022	8.6
23	"Leandro se queda sin voz"	20 October 2022	8.2
24	"Leandro recibe una advertencia"	21 October 2022	8.6
25	"Leandro rechaza grabar un disco"	24 October 2022	8.5
26	"Leandro se escapa con Matilde Lina"	25 October 2022	8.7
27	"Matilde Lina se despide de Leandro"	26 October 2022	8.9
28	"Leandro conoce a Clementina"	27 October 2022	9.0
29	"Leandro se entusiasma con Corina"	28 October 2022	7.7
30	"Leandro le declara su amor a Corina"	31 October 2022	7.0
31	"Corina le deja las cosas claras a Leandro"	1 November 2022	7.0
32	"Leandro se reencuentra con Matilde Lina"	2 November 2022	7.7
33	"Matilde Lina ayuda a Leandro"	3 November 2022	8.3
34	"Arturo confiesa que le robó la canción a Leandro"	4 November 2022	8.1
35	"Leandro se enfrenta a Onofre"	8 November 2022	7.6
36	"Matilde Lina da a luz a su bebé con Moisés"	9 November 2022	7.2
37	"Leandro logra componerle la canción a Matilde Lina"	10 November 2022	7.6
38	"Leandro se besa con Matilde Lina"	11 November 2022	7.5
39	"Leandro graba su primer disco"	15 November 2022	7.8
40	"Leandro no logra llegar al cumpleaños de Matilde"	16 November 2022	7.3
41	"Matilde Lina no quiso escuchar a Leandro"	17 November 2022	7.4
42	"Matilde y Leandro se reconcilian"	18 November 2022	8.0
43	"Moisés confiesa lo que hizo con Leandro"	21 November 2022	7.2
44	"El triste final de la abuela Remedios"	22 November 2022	7.4
45	"Leandro termina con Matilde Lina"	23 November 2022	7.5
46	"Nace el hijo de Leandro y Clementina"	24 November 2022	7.6
47	"Matilde Lina conoce al hijo de Leandro"	25 November 2022	7.2
48	"Leandro se casa con Clementina"	28 November 2022	8.2
49	"Leandro recuerda nostálgico a Matilde Lina"	29 November 2022	7.6
50	"Leandro tiene romántico sueño con Matilde"	30 November 2022	6.6
51	"Clementina discute con Leandro"	1 December 2022	6.8
52	"Leandro se reencuentra con Matilde"	2 December 2022	7.4
53	"Matilde le da una nueva oportunidad a Roberto"	5 December 2022	7.3
54	"Matilde se verá de nuevo con Leandro"	6 December 2022	7.0
55	"Un caótico bautizo"	7 December 2022	4.1
56	"Leandro deberá encontrar nueva disquera"	12 December 2022	7.9
57	"Arturo sigue arruinando la vida de Leandro"	13 December 2022	7.3
58	"Arturo prohíbe las fiestas en San Diego"	14 December 2022	7.0
59	"Leandro se va de su casa para conseguir trabajo"	15 December 2022	6.9
60	"Leandro hace famosa a Matilde Lina"	16 December 2022	7.5
61	"Matilde Lina recibe un fuerte reclamo de Moisés"	30 January 2023	7.0
62	"Arturo está más cerca de Leandro"	31 January 2023	5.8
63	"Los trabajadores se sublevan"	1 February 2023	5.9
64	"Matilde Lina llega a Codazzi para ver a Leandro"	2 February 2023	7.0
65	"Leandro visita a su familia en San Diego"	3 February 2023	5.8
66	"Leandro le tiende una trampa a sus persecutores"	6 February 2023	5.6
67	"Moisés le confiesa su enfermedad a Matilde Lina"	7 February 2023	6.8
68	"Tía Erótida y sus consejos a Leandro"	8 February 2023	6.7
69	"Tía Erótida viaja a Bogotá"	9 February 2023	5.7
70	"Los episodios violentos de Moisés"	10 February 2023	6.5
71	"Moisés se despide de Matilde"	13 February 2023	6.2
72	"Oscar parte de este mundo"	14 February 2023	6.2
73	"Tía Erótida tiene una cita romántica"	15 February 2023	6.2
74	"Nelsy besa inesperadamente a Leandro"	16 February 2023	5.4
75	"El plan de Arturo fue descubierto por Onofre"	17 February 2023	6.5
76	"A Onofre le queda poco tiempo de vida"	20 February 2023	5.1
77	"La familia Duarte Díaz sufre una gran pérdida"	21 February 2023	5.5
78	"Un dulce encuentro"	22 February 2023	6.5
79	"Los errores se pagan con creces"	23 February 2023	6.7
80	"El talento de Leandro traspasa fronteras"	24 February 2023	5.8
81	"El karma llegó a la vida de Arturo"	27 February 2023	6.0
82	"El legado de un cantante"	28 February 2023	7.1

=== Special ===
No.	Title	Original release date	Colombia viewers (Rating points)
1	"Silvestre, los ojos de Leandro"	25 September 2022	2.7
The special follows the story behind Leandro Díaz and a behind-the-scenes look at the production of the series.

== Production ==
In December 2020, it was announced that RCN Televisión was developing a biographical series based on Leandro Díaz, with Silvestre Dangond being confirmed as the titular character. Filming of the series began on 12 May 2022. On 31 August 2022, it was announced that the series would premiere on 19 September 2022.

== Reception ==
=== Ratings ===
Season	Timeslot (COT)	Episodes	First aired		Last aired		Avg. viewers (in points)
Season	Timeslot (COT)	Episodes	Date	Viewers (in points)	Date	Viewers (in points)	Avg. viewers (in points)
1	Mon–Fri 9:30 p.m.	82	19 September 2022	6.8	28 February 2023	7.1	7.3

=== Awards and nominations ===
Year	Award	Category	Nominated	Result	Ref
2023	India Catalina Awards	Best Fiction Series - Long Form	Leandro Díaz	Nominated	
2023	India Catalina Awards	Best Lead Actor	Silvestre Dangond	Nominated	
2023	India Catalina Awards	Best Supporting Actress	Viña Machado	Nominated	
2023	India Catalina Awards	Best Newcomer Actor or Actress	Silvestre Dangond	Won	
2023	India Catalina Awards	Best Child Talent	Abel Villa	Won	
2023	India Catalina Awards	Best Editor	Silva Ayala	Nominated	
2023	India Catalina Awards	Best Cinematography	Yon Franco and Germán Plata	Nominated	
2023	India Catalina Awards	Best Art Direction	Gonzalo Martínez	Nominated	
2023	India Catalina Awards	Best Musical Director	Oliver Camargo	Nominated	
2023	India Catalina Awards	Favorite Production of the Public	Leandro Díaz	Won	
2023	India Catalina Awards	Favorite Talent of the Public	Mario Espitia	Won	
2023	Produ Awards	Best Superseries	Leandro Díaz	Nominated	
2023	Produ Awards	Best Music Theme - Superseries or Telenovela	"Matilde Lina" by Silvestre Dangond	Won	
2023	Produ Awards	Best Lead Actor - Superseries or Telenovela	Silvestre Dangond	Nominated	
2023	Produ Awards	Best Supporting Actress - Superseries or Telenovela	Viña Machado	Won	
2023	Produ Awards	Best Supporting Actor - Superseries or Telenovela	Diego Vásquez	Won	
2023	Produ Awards	Best Newcomer Actor	Silvestre Dangond	Nominated	
