= Natalia París =

Colombian media personality and socialite (born 1973)

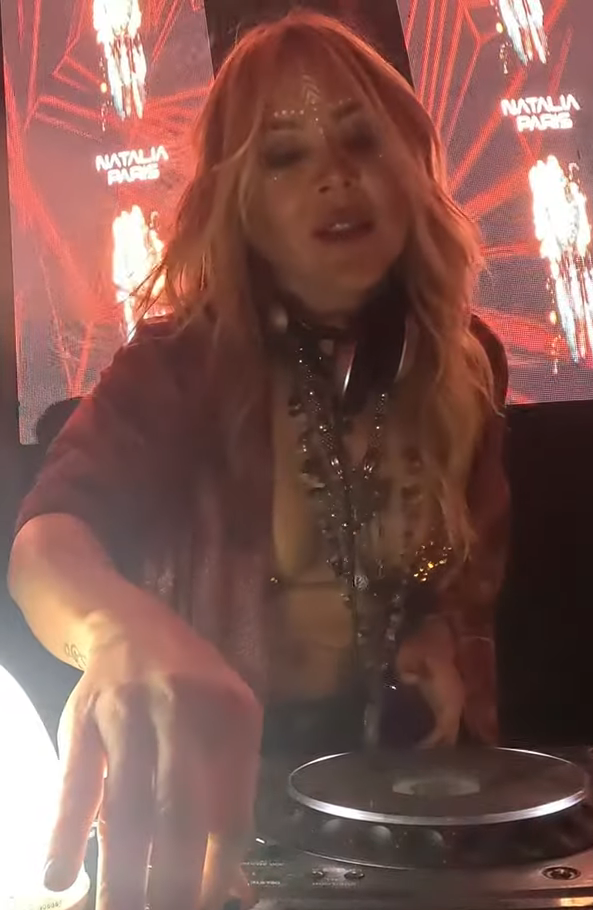
- Natalia París in 2024
- Born: Natalia París Gaviria; August 12, 1973 (age 53); Medellín, Antioquia, Colombia
- Occupations: Media personality; businesswoman; model; entertainer; DJ
- Years active: 1990–present
- Musical career
- Genres: Pop; dance

Natalia París Gaviria (born August 12, 1973) is a Colombian model, businesswoman, DJ and publicist. She has been one of the most recognized models in Colombia, owner of a brand of personal care products which bears her name.

== Background ==
París has been the subject of jokes and satires about her beauty and intelligence, about which she affirms that she sees them with a very good sense of humor since she considers herself an intelligent, professional and unconcerned woman about what they will say. She adds, "Thanks to those jokes I've sold more suntan lotions and beauty products than ever before "laughs", I've cleverly turned this around."

She has her own brand of jeans in a prestigious chain store in Colombia.

She has been an exclusive model for Cristal Oro beer and for the Bésame underwear brand. Her short stature (1.55 m) was not an impediment to becoming one of the most famous models in her country in the 1990s, although it was an obstacle in the United States and internationally; this prevented her from transcending the borders of Colombia. She, however, still enjoys popularity in her home nation, as well as in some Central and South American countries.

She participates in many other campaigns such as being the image of the Global Humanitarian Foundation, which helps children suffering from extreme poverty. Furthermore, she supports campaigns against child sexual abuse.

Since 1999 she has launched a line of suntan lotions and skin care products under her name.

== Early life ==
Natalia is the daughter of the pilot and merchant captain Carlos Enrique Ricardo París Toro and Lucía Gaviria, who was also a model and is now a criminal lawyer from Medellín. She studied at the La Enseñanza school until ninth grade and finished her studies at the San José de las Vegas school in Medellín. She graduated as a publicist at the Institute of Arts. She became a well-known model and actress by accident.

She started modeling diaper brands when she was eight months old, but it was in her teens that she became known for her campaigns in Colombian brands such as Bésame and Tanía, among others.

== Personal life ==
She was for several years, the partner of the drug trafficker Julio César Correa Valdés (known as Julio Fierro), with whom she has a daughter, Mariana, who was born in 2000. Shortly after Mariana was born, Correa was murdered. She later had a romantic relationship with the Venezuelan actor Juan Alfonso Baptista, better known as "El Gato", but after five years the couple separated.

She currently resides in Bogotá.

== Career ==
In the field of acting, she starred in the film In Fraganti (2010) and she also acted in the Colombian film En coma, in the role of a female victim of domestic violence. She also starred as Cindy in the TV series Los caballeros las prefieren brutas in its last season (2010).

In 2010 she was host of the reality show La Granja and host of E! Fashion week: Colombiamoda for the entertainment channel E!

In 2011 she debuted as a DJ, a role in which she has received the most varied reception.

Her story was briefly represented in the Colombian series El cartel de los sapos by actress Nataly Umaña who played the role of Juanita Marín. París expressed her opinion saying: "I don't see a novel where the truth is distorted and shows such a distorted version of my life (...) That they call me to represent myself, for that I am preparing myself in the field of acting".
