= Café con aroma de mujer (2021 TV series) =

Colombian telenovela

- Genre: Telenovela
- Created by: Adriana Suárez
- Based on: Café con aroma de mujer by Fernando Gaitán
- Written by: Adriana Suárez; Javier Giraldo; Paola Cazares; Cecilia Percy
- Directed by: Mauricio Cruz Fortunato; Olga Lucía Rodríguez
- Starring: William Levy; Laura Londoño; Carmen Villalobos; Diego Cadavid
- Theme music composer: Josefina Severino; Ricardo Torres; José Manuel Fernández; Nicolás Uribe; Sebastián Luengas; Natalia Rodríguez
- Opening theme: "Gaviota" by Laura Londoño
- Composer: Laguna Records
- Country of origin: Colombia
- Original language: Spanish
- No. of seasons: 1
- No. of episodes: 92

Production
- Executive producer: Yalile Giordanelli
- Production locations: Colombia; New York City, United States
- Production company: RCN Televisión

Original release
- Network: Canal RCN
- Release: 10 May – 24 September 2021

Related
- Cuando seas mía; Destilando amor

Café con aroma de mujer (English title: The Scent of Passion) is a Colombian telenovela produced by RCN Televisión and distributed by Telemundo. It first aired on Canal RCN from 10 May 2021 to 24 September 2021. In the United States, it aired on Telemundo from 25 May 2021 to 27 September 2021. It is a new adaptation of the 1994 Colombian telenovela of the same name written by Fernando Gaitán, of which two adaptations were made for Mexico with the titles of Cuando seas mía and Destilando amor. The shows stars William Levy, Laura Londoño, and Carmen Villalobos.

== Plot ==
Every year, Gaviota (Laura Londoño) and her mother arrive at Hacienda Casablanca to pick up the coffee from the second harvest of the year, but they hope that their next visit will be their last, because from now on they will be owners of their own land. However, fate has other plans. Octavio Vallejo, the owner of the hacienda, has just died. Gaviota previously had saved him from a kidnapping. Octavio promised as a reward to give her one hectare of land so that she could grow her own coffee. Trying to get the Vallejo family to honor the agreement, Gaviota meets Sebastián (William Levy), Octavio's son, and an irrepressible attraction is born between them, a heartbreaking, impossible love, becoming two lovers who belong to different worlds.

== Cast ==
=== Main ===
- William Levy as Sebastián Vallejo
- Laura Londoño as Teresa Suárez "La Gaviota"
- Carmen Villalobos as Lucía Sanclemente
- Diego Cadavid as Iván Vallejo
- Lincoln Palomeque as Leonidas Salinas
- Luces Velásquez as Julia de Vallejo
- Katherine Vélez as Carmenza Suárez
- Andrés Toro as Aurelio Díaz
- Mabel Moreno as Lucrecia Valencia de Castillo
- Ramiro Meneses as Carlos Mario
- María Teresa Barreto as Marcela Vallejo
- Laura Archbold as Paula Vallejo
- Juan David Agudelo as Bernardo Vallejo
- Laura Junco as Margarita Briceño
- Dailyn Valdivieso as La Maracucha
- Caterin Escobar as Marcia

=== Recurring ===
- Marcelo Dos Santos as Eduardo Sanclemente
- Yarlo Ruíz as Lemarcus Acosta
- Raúl Ocampo as Carlos
- Pedro Gilmore as Arthur
- Mario Duarte as Pablo Emilio
- Constanza Gutierrez as Margot
- Maia Landaburu as Diana
- Carlos Manuel Vesga as Danilo
- Waldo Urrego as Pedro Alzate
- María del Rosario as Aura
- Jorge López as Javier
- Juan Carlos Cruz as Wilson Briceño
- Julian Santamaría
- Julian Andrés Velásquez
- Juan Sebastián Ruíz

=== Guest stars ===
- Luis Eduardo Motoa as Octavio Vallejo

== Production ==
Production began in December 2020, in Colombia. The cast list was announced on 4 December 2020 by the American magazine People en Español. A trailer of the series was released on 5 April 2021.

== Soundtrack ==
Café con aroma de mujer

Soundtrack album by Laura Londoño
- Released: 12 July 2021
- Length: 31:01

The soundtrack of the telenovela was released on 12 July 2021.

No.	Title	Artist(s)	Length
1.	"Gaviota"	Laura Londoño	2:58
2.	"Sombra de su Amor"	Laura Londoño	3:50
3.	"Como Si Nada"	Laura Londoño	3:56
4.	"Como Un Cristal"	Laura Londoño	2:41
5.	"Mal Amor"	Laura Londoño	3:14
6.	"Amor Qué Me Hiciste"	Laura Londoño	4:19
7.	"As de Corazones"	Laura Londoño	4:01
8.	"Sangra un Corazón"	Laura Londoño	2:05
9.	"Cuanta Farsa"	Laura Londoño	3:53
Total length:			31:01

Café con aroma de mujer (Bonus Track)

Soundtrack album by Laura Londoño
- Released: 2 August 2021
- Length: 5:28

Two additional soundtracks for the telenovela were released on 2 August 2021.

No.	Title	Artist(s)	Length
1.	"Amor de Verdad"	Laura Londoño	2:40
2.	"Unidas para Siempre"	Laura Londoño	2:47
Total length:			5:28

== Episodes ==
No.	Title	Original release date	Colombia viewers (Rating points)
1	"Amor a primera vista entre Sebastián y Gaviota"	10 May 2021	8.7
2	"La sorprendente confesión que Sebastián le hace a Marcela sobre Gaviota"	11 May 2021	7.8
3	"Gaviota le confiesa a su mamá que se besó con Sebastián"	12 May 2021	7.6
4	"Sebastián le hace una importante revelación a Gaviota"	13 May 2021	7.0
5	"Gaviota y Carmenza reciben una noticia poco agradable"	14 May 2021	6.5
6	"Sebastián siente celos al ver a Gaviota junto a Léonidas"	18 May 2021	6.6
7	"Gaviota y Sebastián pasan la noche juntos"	19 May 2021	6.1
8	"Sebastián le confiesa a Lucía que está interesado en otra mujer"	20 May 2021	6.3
9	"Julia defiende a Gaviota ante las acusaciones de Iván"	21 May 2021	6.5
10	"Lucía se entera de la verdad sobre Sebastián y Gaviota"	24 May 2021	6.3
11	"Gaviota y Sebastián emprenden una aventura"	25 May 2021	6.2
12	"Sebastián y Gaviota viven un apasionado momento"	26 May 2021	7.3
13	"Lucía le confiesa la verdad a Julia sobre la relación de Sebastián"	27 May 2021	7.3
14	"Sebastián invita a Gaviota al matrimonio de Iván y se entera de una noticia"	28 May 2021	5.9
15	"Sebastián llega al matrimonio de Iván junto a Gaviota"	31 May 2021	7.1
16	"Sebastián confronta a Gaviota y le pide que le cuente la verdad"	1 June 2021	6.8
17	"La situación en la hacienda Casa Blanca se sale de control"	2 June 2021	7.3
18	"Una triste despedida"	3 June 2021	7.2
19	"Una drástica decisión"	4 June 2021	6.9
20	"Sebastián se entera de una fatal noticia"	8 June 2021	6.0
21	"La noticia que le cambiará la vida a Gaviota"	9 June 2021	6.6
22	"Gaviota lo dejará todo por amor"	10 June 2021	7.3
23	"Gaviota se arma de valor"	11 June 2021	6.6
24	"Gaviota recibe una sorpresiva noticia"	15 June 2021	6.6
25	"Gaviota llega a Nueva York"	16 June 2021	6.1
26	"Gaviota se juega todas las cartas por ver a Sebastián"	17 June 2021	6.9
27	"Gaviota se reencuentra con Sebastián"	18 June 2021	7.3
28	"Sebastián acude a Carmenza para encontrar a Gaviota"	21 June 2021	7.6
29	"Carmenza le da una inquietante información a Gaviota sobre Sebastián"	22 June 2021	7.4
30	"A Sebastián le dan una valiosa noticia"	24 June 2021	6.2
31	"Sebastián llega al mismo lugar dónde está Gaviota"	25 June 2021	6.0
32	"Lucía le tiende una trampa a Sebastián"	28 June 2021	6.9
33	"Gaviota toma una decisión inesperada"	29 June 2021	6.2
34	"Se descubre un embarazo"	30 June 2021	7.4
35	"Sebastián vuelve a ver a Gaviota"	1 July 2021	6.0
36	"Sebastián besa a Gaviota"	2 July 2021	6.0
37	"Sebastián y Gaviota se reconcilian"	7 July 2021	6.5
38	"Se vale volver a comenzar"	8 July 2021	6.3
39	"Lucía le revela una gran verdad a Gaviota"	12 July 2021	6.1
40	"Sebastián se entera del embarazo de Lucía"	13 July 2021	6.3
41	"Gaviota se reencuentra con su mamá"	14 July 2021	6.3
42	"La maldad de Lucía no tiene límites"	15 July 2021	6.0
43	"Leónidas le propone a Gaviota vivir juntos en Bogotá"	16 July 2021	5.6
44	"Las tensiones en la familia Vallejo se salen de control"	19 July 2021	6.1
45	"Marcela busca a Gaviota y le habla de Sebastián"	21 July 2021	6.4
46	"Gaviota y Carmenza comienzan una nueva vida"	22 July 2021	5.7
47	"Lucía pierde las esperanzas con Sebastián"	23 July 2021	5.8
48	"Lucía y Gaviota conocen el sexo de sus bebés"	26 July 2021	5.5
49	"El nacimiento de los hijos de Lucía y Gaviota"	27 July 2021	6.0
50	"Sebastián se encuentra a Leónidas en el hospital"	28 July 2021	5.9
51	"Leónidas y Gaviota se besan"	29 July 2021	6.0
52	"Sebastián y Lucía se casan"	30 July 2021	5.9
53	"El destino vuelve a poner en el mismo camino a Gaviota y a Sebastián"	2 August 2021	6.8
54	"Sebastián le hace una confesión a Gaviota que la deja sin palabras"	3 August 2021	6.1
55	"Sebastián le hace una invitación especial a Gaviota y a Carmenza"	4 August 2021	6.5
56	"Lucía recibe una visita que complicará la situación"	5 August 2021	6.4
57	"Leónidas sorprende a Gaviota con una revelación"	6 August 2021	5.4
58	"A Iván se le viene el mundo encima"	9 August 2021	6.8
59	"Sebastián le confiesa una fatal verdad a Julia"	10 August 2021	6.4
60	"Gaviota regresa al pueblo y se lleva una sorpresa"	11 August 2021	6.7
61	"La situación entre Sebastián e Iván se sale de control"	12 August 2021	6.6
62	"Gaviota rechaza a Leónidas"	13 August 2021	6.1
63	"Leónidas toma la decisión de terminar su relación con Gaviota"	17 August 2021	6.7
64	"Gaviota asiste al homenaje de Octavio"	18 August 2021	6.7
65	"El bello gesto que Sebastián tiene con Gaviota y Carmenza"	19 August 2021	6.4
66	"Sebastián y Gaviota no se pueden resistir a lo que sienten"	20 August 2021	6.2
67	"Sebastián se entera de que tiene un hijo con Gaviota"	23 August 2021	6.8
68	"Lucía queda entre la espada y la pared"	24 August 2021	7.6
69	"Sebastián toma la decisión de separarse de Lucía"	25 August 2021	7.7
70	"Lucía le revela a Julia que Sofía no es hija de Sebastián"	26 August 2021	7.1
71	"Julia conoce a Fernando, el hijo de Gaviota y Sebastián"	27 August 2021	6.8
72	"Lucía encuentra a Sebastián y a Gaviota besándose"	30 August 2021	7.1
73	"Lucía e Iván viven un apasionado momento"	31 August 2021	7.0
74	"Lucía le pide la mitad de su fortuna a Iván"	1 September 2021	6.9
75	"Sebastián y Leónidas viven un conmovedor momento"	2 September 2021	8.4
76	"Gaviota y Sebastián vuelven a creer en su amor"	3 September 2021	6.3
77	"Se le derrumba el mundo a Lucía"	6 September 2021	8.1
78	"Se cancela un esperado matrimonio"	7 September 2021	7.5
79	"Lucrecia le hace inesperada confesión a Iván"	8 September 2021	7.9
80	"Julia le confiesa una gran verdad a Sebastián"	9 September 2021	7.4
81	"Sebastián se entera de que Sofía no es su hija"	10 September 2021	7.4
82	"Sebastián le propone matrimonio a Gaviota"	13 September 2021	8.9
83	"Lucía e Iván mueven sus cartas en contra de Sebastián"	13 September 2021	8.9
84	"Iván confiesa una cruel verdad"	14 September 2021	9.0
85	"Sebastián es detenido por la Policía"	15 September 2021	9.0
86	"Lucía recibe una lamentable noticia"	16 September 2021	9.7
87	"Gaviota se entera de que Sebastián está detenido"	17 September 2021	8.5
88	"Iván intenta hacerle daño a Fernando"	20 September 2021	9.5
89	"Iván sigue haciendo de las suyas"	21 September 2021	9.2
90	"Marcia decide testificar contra Carlos Mario e Iván"	22 September 2021	10.3
91	"Sebastián queda en libertad"	23 September 2021	10.4
92	"Sebastián y Gaviota se casan"	24 September 2021	9.4

== Reception ==
=== Ratings ===
Viewership and ratings per season of Café con aroma de mujer
Season	Timeslot (COT)	Episodes	First aired		Last aired		Avg. viewers (millions)
Season	Timeslot (COT)	Episodes	Date	Viewers (millions)	Date	Viewers (millions)	Avg. viewers (millions)
1	Mon–Fri 8:00 pm (1–82); Mon–Fri 9:00 pm (83–92)	92	10 May 2021	8.7	24 September 2021	9.4	6.97

=== Awards and nominations ===
Year	Award	Category	Nominee(s)	Result	Ref.
2021	Produ Awards	Best Superseries	Café con aroma de mujer	Nominated	
2022	India Catalina Awards	Best Antagonist Actor	Diego Cadavid	Nominated	
2022	India Catalina Awards	Best Antagonist Actress	Carmen Villalobos	Won	
2022	India Catalina Awards	Best Supporting Actor	Ramiro Meneses	Won	
2022	India Catalina Awards	Best Music Director	Josefina Severino and Nicolás Uribe	Nominated	
2022	India Catalina Awards	Public's Favorite Talent	Katherine Vélez	Won	
