= A corazón abierto (Colombian TV series) =

Colombian telenovela

- Genre: Telenovela
- Created by: Fernando Gaitán
- Based on: Grey's Anatomy by Shonda Rhimes
- Written by: Sandra Gaitán; Fernan Rivera; Mauricio Guerra; Mauricio Miranda; Cecilia Percy; Elkin Opina
- Directed by: Sergio Osorio
- Creative director: Lucas Jaramillo Vélez
- Starring: Rafael Novoa; Verónica Orozco; Carolina Gómez; Jorge Enrique Abello; Jorge Cao; Rolando Tarajano; Juan Pablo Espinosa; Santiago Moure; Aída Morales; Natalia Durán; Juan Manuel Mendoza; Sandra Hernández; Marlon Moreno; Carolina Guerra; Iván López; María Lara
- Music by: Juan Gabriel Turbay
- Opening theme: "A corazón abierto" by Verónica Orozco
- Country of origin: Colombia
- Original language: Spanish
- No. of seasons: 2
- No. of episodes: 169

Production
- Executive producers: Leonardo Aranguibel; Jaime Sanchez Cristo; Fernando Barbosa
- Producer: Silvia Durán
- Production location: Bogotá
- Cinematography: Yon Franco
- Editors: César Barreto; Marcela Vázquez
- Camera setup: Multi-camera
- Production company: Vista Productions

Original release
- Network: RCN Televisión
- Release: April 26, 2010 – August 11, 2011

Related
- A corazón abierto (Mexican telenovela)

A corazón abierto is a Colombian telenovela premiered on RCN Televisión on April 26, 2010, and concluded on August 11, 2011. The series is created by Fernando Gaitán based on the American medical drama created by Shonda Rhimes, entitled Grey's Anatomy.

== Plot ==
=== Season 1 (2010) ===
Surgeon María Alejandra Rivas (Verónica Orozco) is admitted to the program for interns at the Hospital Universitario of Santa María. Now Alzheimer's diseased, Maria Alejandra bears responsibility that gives her his last name. His group of new friends, Jorge Viana (Juan Manuel Mendoza), Cristina Solano (Natalia Durán), Isabel Henao (Sandra Hernández) and Augusto Maza (Juan Pablo Espinosa), will from now on become their new family. María Alejandra faces loneliness helped by these new people and by the relationship that she establishes with Andrés Guerra (Rafael Novoa), a surgeon of the hospital.

== Cast ==
=== Main ===
- Rafael Novoa as Andrés Guerra
- Verónica Orozco as María Alejandra Rivas
- Carolina Gómez as Alicia Durán
- Jorge Enrique Abello as Mauricio Hernández
- Jorge Cao as Ricardo Cepeda
- Rolando Tarajano as Javier Burgos
- Juan Pablo Espinosa as Augusto Maza
- Santiago Moure as Germán de la Pava
- Aída Morales as Miranda Carvajal
- Natalia Durán as Cristina Solano
- Juan Manuel Mendoza as Jorge Viana
- Marlon Moreno as Juan Felipe Becerra (season 2)
- Sandra Hernández as Isabel Henao
- Carolina Guerra as Violeta Botero (season 2)
- Iván López as Rafael Gómez (season 2)
- Rodrigo Abed as Javier Burgos
- María Lara as Claudia Torres (season 2)

=== Recurring ===
- Juliana Gómez as Enfermera Nelly
- Jean Paul Leroux as Sebastián Cárdenas
- Alejandro López as Santiago
- Brian Moreno as Rolando
- Diego Trujillo as Marcos Perdomo
- Jacques Toukhmanian as Daniel Duque
- Carlos Kajú as Jeison Campos
- Jordana Issa as Usnaby
- Marcela Posada as Laura Cruz
- Lina Castrillón as Sandra Galindo
- María Elvira Arango as Elvira

== Premiere ==
On April 26, 2010, A Corazón Abierto premiered in Colombia to excellent ratings. With a 20.4 rating and 48 share, almost half the television viewing audience in Colombia watched the premiere.
