= Café con aroma de mujer (1994 TV series) =

Colombian telenovela of 1994, created by Fernando Gaitán

- Created by: Fernando Gaitán
- Directed by: Pepe Sánchez
- Starring: Margarita Rosa de Francisco; Guy Ecker; Alejandra Borrero; Cristóbal Errázuriz; Silva de Dios; Constanza Duque
- Opening theme: Gaviota by Margarita Rosa de Francisco
- Country of origin: Colombia
- Original language: Spanish
- No. of episodes: 169

Production
- Production locations: Bogotá, Colombia
- Running time: 45 minutes
- Production company: RCN Televisión

Original release
- Network: Canal A
- Release: 1994 – 1995

Related
- Café con aroma de mujer (2021 version)

Café con aroma de mujer ("Coffee with the Scent of a Woman") is a 1994 Colombian telenovela produced by then programming company RCN Televisión on state-owned Canal A. It was created and written by Fernando Gaitán. It was broadcast in several countries throughout Latin America, North America and Europe.

== Overview ==
Teresa Suárez (Margarita Rosa de Francisco), nicknamed "Gaviota" (Spanish for "gull"), and her mother Carmenza Suárez, work as harvesters and throughout the year they travel to different farmlands across Colombia searching for work. Each October, just prior to the harvest period in the coffee axis, they travel to the hacienda Casablanca in Filandia whose owner, powerful coffee businessman Octavio Vallejo, secures employment for them. One October, Vallejo dies and his family, spread over the world, heads back to Casablanca to attend the funeral. Once back in the hacienda after several years in London, his grandson Sebastián Vallejo (Guy Ecker) meets Gaviota and only with her he is eventually able to overcome his fear of women.

After a few encounters, Sebastián and Gaviota begin a short, but passionate affair that becomes for both of them their first true romantic experience. They keep their romance a secret, specially from his aristocratic family, but eventually he must leave back for London after his grandfather's funeral to finish his college studies. The pair agree to reunite in Casablanca exactly the same date the following year, once he graduates, to finally marry. Shortly after Sebastián's departure, Gaviota finds out she is pregnant. Finding no means to get in contact with him, distrusting his family and with no one else to turn to, she decides to travel to Europe herself to search for him, having been deceived by a network of human trafficking who prey on her naivete by offering her a job as a model but actually hoping to exploit her as a prostitute in Paris.

Sebastián returns to Casablanca the following year to keep his promise and, after searching for her in town, he finds out she went to Europe to work as a prostitute. Disheartened, and influenced by his avaricious cousin Iván Vallejo (Cristóbal Errázuriz), he weds his friend Lucía Sandoval (Alejandra Borrero) who accepts a lifetime in a completely sexless marriage just to be by his side.

Gaviota, having assumed a new identity in Europe as Carolina Olivares, finally returns to Colombia but only manages to arrive at Casablanca the morning after Sebastián and Lucía's wedding ceremony has taken place there. Dismayed by the sudden turn of events, Gaviota looks for her mother and secretly leaves Casablanca for good in order to stay away from Sebastián and to find a better life in Bogotá. Having much difficulty in the huge and unfamiliar city she eventually returns to the world of coffee, this time being employed by Cafexport, the coffee-exporting company owned by the Vallejo family, under her alternate identity as Carolina Olivares. After realising Gaviota's return to Casablanca and her almost immediate departure, and also regretting his hasty and love-lacking marriage, Sebastián decides to employ all his means to find her. Lucía eventually finds out about his previous story with Gaviota and vows to keep her marriage and fight by thwarting his plans, while Iván and his wife Lucrecia (Sylvia de Dios) secretly plot to keep Sebastián and Gaviota apart in order to keep late Octavio Vallejo's wealth for themselves.

== Impact ==
This telenovela marked a difference in Latin American telenovelas and the way they were created. The story involved both typical and modern parts of Colombia, taking place in the heart of Colombian coffee plantations, showing a panoramic and authentic view of the culture of Colombian coffee growers and the traditional heartland of Colombia's coffee-growing highlands, while also taking place in the capital city and providing an insight into the coffee business in an important coffee export company and the National Federation of Coffee Growers of Colombia.

In a short time, Café, con aroma de mujer became popular among audiences of all ages and genders, to the point that it became popularly told how the whole country would "come to a standstill" when the show came on the air on weeknights at 20:00. Its competition on Canal Uno was Las aguas mansas produced by RTI Colombia, which would be remade in 2003 as the successful Pasión de gavilanes.

The lead star Margarita Rosa de Francisco, already popular for her roles in Gallito Ramirez (1986) and Los Pecados de Inés de Hinojosa (1988) and for being a former Miss Colombia (second place in Miss World 1985), gave life to "Gaviota", one of the most popular characters in Colombian television and De Francisco's most important work.

== Cast ==
=== Main cast ===
- Margarita Rosa de Francisco ... Teresa "Gaviota" Suárez / Carolina Olivares Maldonado
- Guy Ecker ... Sebastián Vallejo
- Alejandra Borrero ... Lucía Sandoval de Vallejo
- Cristóbal Errázuriz ... Iván Vallejo
- Sylvia de Dios ... Lucrecia Rivas de Vallejo
- Constanza Duque ... Carmenza Suárez

=== Supporting cast ===
- Sílvio Ángel ... Buitrago
- Juan Carlos Arango ... Aurelio
- Santiago Bejarano ... Miguel Alfonso Tejeiros de Caballero
- Óscar Borda ... Harold McLein
- Alejandro Buenaventura ... Roberto Avellaneda
- Manuel Busquets ... Jorge Latorre
- Gustavo Corredor ... Rafael Vallejo y Cómo Octavio Vallejo joven.
- Juan Ángel ... Mauricio Salinas
- Luz Dary Beltrán ... Josefina
- Gloria Amparo Carmona ... Daniela
- Gerardo de Francisco ... Francisco Vallejo
- Kenny Delgado ... Víctor Ángel
- Myriam De Lourdes ... Ángela Sáenz de Vallejo
- Tania Fálquez ... Martha Benavides
- Danna García ... Marcela Vallejo Cortez
- Harry Geithner ... Dr. Carmona
- Claudia Liliana Gonzalez ... Daniela Reyes
- Jacqueline Henríquez ... Graciela
- Lina María Navia ... Paula Vallejo Cortez
- Haydee Ramírez ... Marcia Fontalvo
- Iván Rodríguez ... Reinaldo Pérez
- Andrei Satora ... Arthur
- Rey Vásquez ... El Galtero
- Guillermo Vives ... Bernardo Vallejo Sáenz
- Dora Cadavid ... Cecilia de Vallejo
- Bibiana Navas ... Matilde
- Carlos Serrato ... Maestro Computación y Ministro del Comité Cafetero.

== Soundtrack ==
1. Gaviota
2. Aroma de mujer - _{"Scent of a woman"}
3. Entre dos fuegos - _{"Between two fires"}
4. Volveran las Obscuras Golondrinas - _{"The dark swallows will return"}
5. Mal Amor - _{"Bad love"}
6. Sangra un corazón - _{"A heart bleeds"}
7. A mi pesar - _{"To my regret"}
8. As de Corazones - _{"Ace of hearts"}
9. Como si nada - _{"Like if nothing"}
10. Como un cristal - _{"Like a glass"}
11. Vuelve - _{"Come back"}
12. Café café - _{"Coffee - coffee"}
13. Ni soy río, ni soy flor - _{"Neither am river, nor a flower"}
14. Chapolera
15. Inquietud - _{"Concern"}

All tracks are sung by Margarita Rosa de Francisco with the exception of «Sangra un Corazón», sung by Argentinian singer Luis Andrés Penagos. The telenovela's opening credits feature «Gaviota», but its Argentinian broadcast used instead «Sin tí» by Donato y Estefano.

== Remakes ==
Cafe con Aroma de Mujer was remade in Mexico twice. In 2001, TV Azteca first produced Cuando seas mía starring Silvia Navarro and Sergio Basañez as 'Paloma' and 'Diego'. In 2007, Televisa produced Destilando Amor with Angélica Rivera and Eduardo Yáñez, changing coffee for tequila.

In 2021, a different, modern version of Cafe con Aroma de Mujer has been remade by RCN Televisión, starring Laura Londoño and William Levy. All the soundtracks in the 2021 remake are performed by Laura Londoño herself.

== International release ==
Country	Network(s)	Series premiere	Series finale	Title	Weekly Time	Timeslot
Brazil	(SBT) - Netflix BR)	March 5, 2001	September 3, 2001	Café Com Aroma de Mulher	Monday to Saturday	20:15 (UTC-3)
Colombia	Canal A(Now RCN)	November 30, 1994	1995	Café, con aroma de mujer	Monday to Friday	20:00 COL-PER-ECU/22:00 BRA-ARG-PAR-URU/21:00 CHI-BOL-VEN
Spain	TVE La 1	1997	1998	Café, con aroma de mujer	Monday to Friday	21:00ESP/15:00COL/17:00ARG
Brazil	SBT	April 3, 1995	August 18, 1995	Café, com aroma de mulher	Monday to Friday	18:45 BRA
Argentina	Canal 9	March 6, 1995; August 12, 1995	August 4, 1995; March 28, 2014	Café, con aroma de mujer	Monday to Friday	19:00 ARG/ 17:00 COL; 14:30 ARG / 12:30 COL
Argentina	El Trece	November 19, 1997	1998	Café, con aroma de mujer	Monday to Friday	14:00 ARG/12:00 COL
Paraguay	Canal 13	March 14, 1995	August 5, 1995	Café con aroma de mujer	Monday to Friday	19:00 PAR/ 17:00 COL
Uruguay	Canal 10	March 21, 1995	August 12, 1995	Café, con aroma de mujer	Monday to Friday	19:00 URU/ 17:00 COL
Brazil	NET	July 8, 2013	February 14, 2014	Café, con aroma de mujer	Monday to Friday	17:30
Argentina; Paraguay; Uruguay	TVC 4	May 8, 1995	October 6, 1995	Café, con aroma de mujer	Monday to Friday	18:00 ARG-PAR-URU/ 16:00 COL
Chile	TVN	April 3, 1995	September 8, 1999	Café, con aroma de mujer	Monday to Friday	14:30 CHI / 13:30 COL
Panama	Telemetro	April 10, 1995	September 15, 1995	Café, con aroma de mujer	Monday to Friday	15:00 (UTC-5)
Mexico	Netflix LA	January 6, 2014	present	Café, con aroma de mujer	Monday to Sunday	24 hours all episodes at 7:00 pm / 10:00 pm (Brazil, Argentina, Paraguay, Uruguay and South Sandwich) / 8:00 pm (Ecuador, Colombia, Perú and Panamá)/ 11:00 pm (some local times of Brazil) / 09:00 pm (Chile, Bolivia, Venezuela and Dominican Republic)

== DVD release ==
There are no plans to release the telenovela on DVD. However, there are bootleg copies of the show on DVD.

== Sources ==
- Cronología del cine latinoamericano: 1990-2004 Original Spanish article.

== See also ==
- Café con aroma de mujer (2021 TV series)
