= María Elvira Arango =

Colombian journalist

- Born: María Elvira Arango Pardo; June 3, 1967 (age 59); Bogotá, Colombia
- Occupations: Journalist, television presenter and media personality
- Notable credit(s): Presenting: The informants

María Elvira Arango Pardo (born June 3, 1967) is a Colombian journalist, actress, broadcaster and TV presenter. She is currently a television presenter of the program Los informants.

== Biography ==
María Elvira Arango studied journalism and social communication at Pontifical Xavierian University. Arango began her television career as a substitute presenter on Noticiero 24 Horas, under the direction of María Isabel Rueda to later be an official presenter next to Adriana Arango Muñoz and Javier Hernández Bonnet. Her stay in the newscasting was until 1995.

In 1997, she transitioned to Radionet, directing news and reports. Later she was part of the team of the program "Sábado Nuestro" of Caracol Radio, then in La FM later in W Radio, with Julio Sánchez Cristo.

Among her media jobs, she has ventured into CBS Telenoticias. Presented NotiCentro 1 CM& between 1995 and 1998. Later she presented with Jorge Alfredo Vargas, Vicky Dávila and Juan Eduardo Jaramillo in Noticias RCN twice 1998-1999 and 2005–2006. Arango came back to the W Radio in the program La hora del Regreso between 2007 and 2009.

She was a correspondent in London and in Miami for Caracol Radio. In 2006 she created and edited the men's magazine Revista DonJuan, and in 2011 she founded Bocas, the Sunday magazine for El Tiempo. In 2013 she returned to television as presenter and director of the program Los informantes for Caracol Televisión.
