= Amor en custodia (Colombian TV series) =

2009 Colombian television series

Amor en Custodia is a Colombian telenovela by Teleset for RCN Television, starring Alejandra Borrero and Venezuelan Ernesto Calzadilla. It was adapted by Julio Castañeda from the Argentinian original written by Marcela Citterio. It premiered on November 9, 2009 on RCN TV.

== Synopsis ==
It tells the story of love and passion of a mother and daughter, Peace and Barbara, by their bodyguards, Juan Manuel and Nicolas, respectively. Their relations are imbued with much drama as this love is not allowed, not only because of jealousy and envy, but because of past mistakes of their respective families.

== Cast ==
- Alejandra Borrero: Paz Delucci / Mónica Martínez
- Ernesto Calzadilla: Juan Manuel Aguirre
- Ana Wills: Bárbara Sanín Delucci
- Iván López: Nicolás Camacho López
- Estefanía Godoy: Tatiana Aguirre
- Marcelo Dos Santos : Alejandro Sanín
- Jenny Osorio: Carolina Acosta
- Humberto Dorado: Santiago Delucci
- Mario Duarte: Ernesto Salinas "Tango"
- Patricia Tamayo: Gabriela
- Nórida Rodríguez: Inés López
- Sonia Cubides: Priscila
- Ana María Medina: Laura Camacho
- Johana Morales: Victoria Delucci
- Carmenza González: Nora
- Ricardo Leguízamo: Gino
- Bibiana Corrales: Rubí
- Hugo Gómez: Walter Camacho
- Consuelo Moure: Alicia Álvarez
- María León Arias: Consuelo
- Cristian Villamil: Cristóbal
- María Eugenia Dávila: Débora
- Germán Escallón: El Holandés
- Jaime Barbini: Fabricio
- Sebastián Sánchez: Robert Gafter
- Felix Antequera: Carlos Gonzales / Frank Fonseca
- Alejandra Azcárate: Renata Shewin
- Valentina Rendón: Isabella
- Marcela Posada: Coral
- María Isabel Henao: Camela
- Juan Carlos Messier: Pascual Shewin
- Nicolás Pachón: Anderson
- Jorge "Kiko" Pubiano: José Barrancas "Jota"
- Héctor Mauricio Cabal: Germán Soler "Loco"
- Paula Silva: Katia
- Natasha Klauss: Sandra Estrada
- Emerson Rodríguez: Raúl Martinez
- Bernardo García: Eugenio
- María Eugenia Penagos: Cástula de Shewin
- Julio Medina: Ignacio Martinez
- Jorge López: Arturo Cáceres
- Giorgio Difeo: Marco Tardelli
- Ilenia Antonine: daughter of Marco Tardelli
- Ana Beatriz Osorio: Diana Miranda
- Marcela Bustamante Maritere
- Cristóbal Errazuriz: Mauricio Gafter

== Production ==
The male protagonists trained under Horacio Tavera (stage combat) and Gildardo Romero, professor of Hapkido (Korean martial art) who are responsible for choreographing the scenes of confrontation and teach weapons handling.

== Remake ==
In 2012 and 2013, Nicandro Díaz Gonzalez produced Amores verdaderos, a Mexican telenovela for Televisa. Eduardo Yáñez, Erika Buenfil, Sebastian Rulli and Eiza González star as the protagonists. Marjorie de Sousa and Guillermo Capetillo star as the antagonists.
