= Fernando Gaitán =

Colombian TV screenwriter (1960-2019)

Fernando Gaitán Salom
- Born: 9 November 1960; Bogotá, Colombia
- Died: 29 January 2019 (aged 58); Bogotá, Colombia
- Occupations: Screenwriter, television producer
- Writing career
- Notable works: Yo soy Betty, la fea Café con aroma de mujer Hasta que la plata nos separe

Fernando Gaitán Salom (9 November 1960 – 29 January 2019) was a Colombian TV series and telenovela screenwriter as well as a producer.

== Career ==
Fernando Gaitán was known for weaving different histories into diverse social contexts. He gained fame in Latin America after writing the telenovela Café, con aroma de mujer and world notoriety for his telenovela Yo soy Betty, la fea which has been adapted in different countries. Yo soy Betty, la fea won the TP de Oro for its nominated category, Mejor Telenovela (Best Soap Opera) in 2002.

The success of Yo soy Betty, la fea led to a sequel in 2002 with Univision's release of Eco moda. Yo soy Betty, la fea also spawned a number of international remakes and adaptations, such as Verliebt in Berlin in Germany, La Fea más bella in Mexico, Lotte in The Netherlands, Ne Rodis Krasivoy in Russia, Jassi Jaissi Koi Nahin in India, Sensiz Olmuyor in Turkey, Maria, i Aschimi in Greece, Yo soy Bea in Spain, Ugly Betty in the United States, and Bela, a Feia in Brazil.

Gaitán received multiple awards and nominations in Colombia and internationally; India Catalina Award (1993, 1994, 2000, 2001), Simón Bolívar Award (1994), El Tiempo Award (1999, 2000), Radio Caracas Televisión Award (2000), Asociación Cronistas del Espectáculo in the United States (1995), GES Awards and INTE Awards in Miami (2002).

An article in Variety reported that the success of Yo soy Betty, la fea spin-offs has led to the search for other telenovelas being planned for the United States.

His Cafe con Aroma de Mujer (Coffee With the Scent of a Woman), a hit for Colombia's RCN TV in 1994, was remade in Mexico twice. The first version was TV Azteca's Cuando seas mia in 2001. As of 2007 Televisa was airing its own Cafe con Aroma de Mujer, with the title Destilando Amor.

== TV filmography ==
=== Writer ===
- Destilando Amor (2007) TV Series
- Lotte (2006) TV Series
- Yo soy Betty, la fea (1999 - 2001) (I am Betty, the ugly)
- Hasta que la plata nos separe (2006) (Until Money do Us Apart) TV Series
- Eco Moda (2001) TV Series
- Cuando seas mía (2001) (When You are Mine) TV series
- Maria, i Aschimi (2007) (Maria, the ugly one) TV series
- Guajira (1996) TV Series (Guajira) Telenovela
- Café, con aroma de mujer (1994) Telenovela
- Azúcar - Part II (Sugar) Telenovela
- Laura por favor (Laura, Please) TV Series
- La quinta hoja del trébol (The Fifth Leaf of Clover)
- La fuerza del poder (The Force of Power)
- Hasta que el dinero nos separe (Until money do us part)
- A corazón abierto (Open-Heart)

=== Executive producer ===
- Ugly Betty (2006) ("The Lyin', the Watch and the Wardrobe") TV Episode

== Personal life ==
Besides writing, Gaitán had as a hobby being a DJ.

== Death ==
Gaitan died of heart failure in a Bogota hospital in 2019.
