= Botero =

Botero is a surname of Italian origin, common in Colombia and along with other similar variants (Boter, Boteri, Botter, Botteri, Bottero), it originated in the Piedmont region of Italy, more specifically, in the town of Bene Vagienna, province of Cuneo.

In the present time, Colombia is the country with the largest number of people bearing this surname. The founder of this family in Colombia was Giovanni Andrea Botero Bernavi, born in the Republic of Genoa, region of Liguria, Italy.

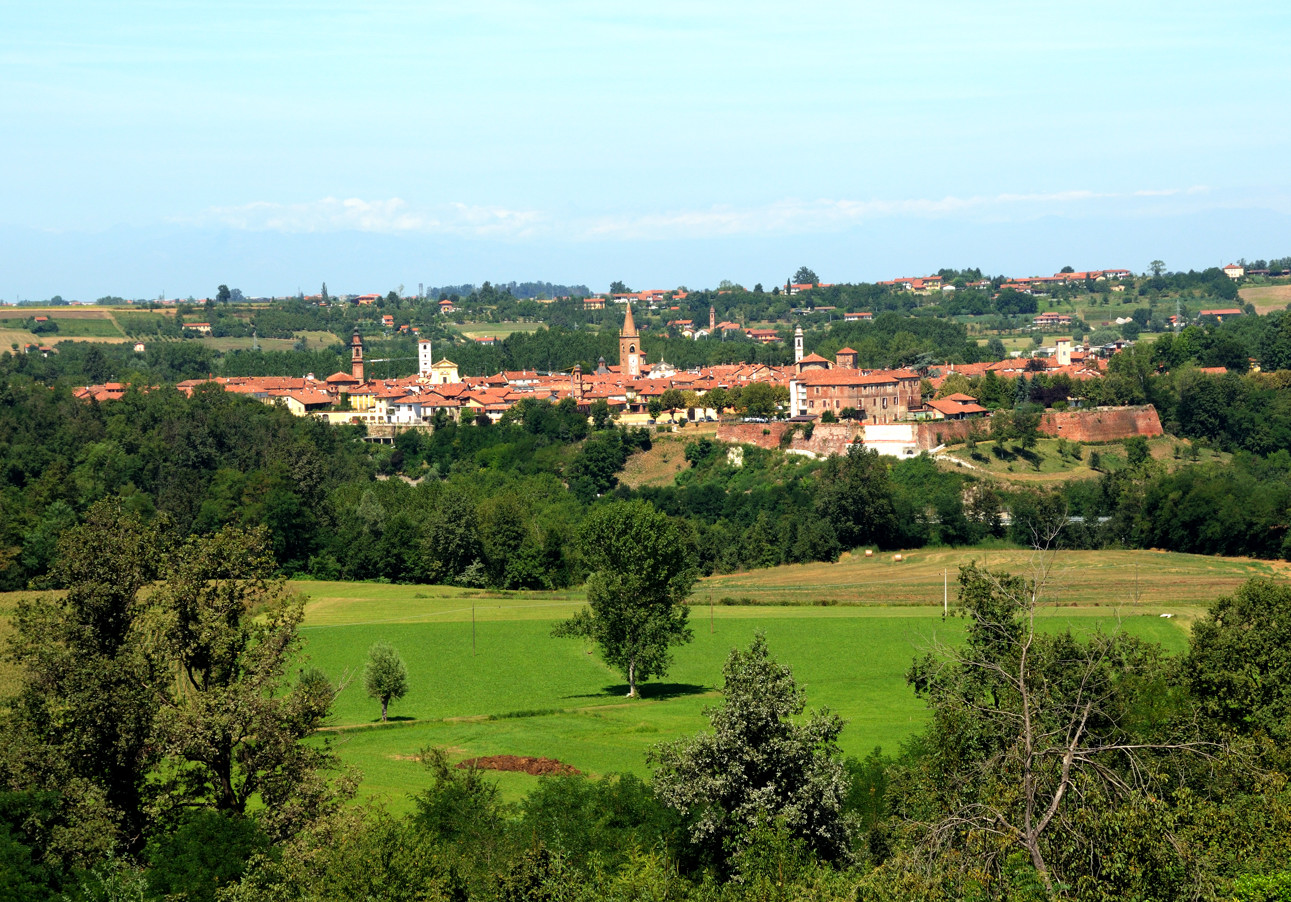
Town of Bene Vagienna, province of Cuneo, Piedmont, Italy

== Origin and etymology ==
It is an occupational surname that originated in the Middle Ages, around the year 500 CE, during which time people (coopers) made barrels for the storage and transportation of liquids and solids such as wine, water, honey, gunpowder, grains, salt and sugar.

At that time, when the Piedmont region was part of the Roman Empire, Boterus was the name given to the people who made the barrels in the town of Bene Vagienna.

== Botero surname in Colombia ==
=== Origins ===
This surname arrived in today's Republic of Colombia, in the 18th century, after the arrival of the Genoese Giovanni Andrea Botero Bernavi (Juan Andrés, in Spanish) from Cádiz, Spain to the city of Cartagena de Indias, Viceroyalty of New Granada around the year 1715, who worked in the service of the Spanish Crown as naval gunner of the Santa Rosa ship, built in the Republic of Genoa for King Philip V of Bourbon.

The main purpose of this trip was to take to present-day Peru, along with his companions, the Prince of Santo Buono, newly appointed Viceroy of Peru, Carmine Nicolau Caracciol, who suffered a family calamity after the death on board of his wife, when giving birth.

Among other factors, that event caused the boat to make a stop in Cartagena, where due to illness, Botero had to give up continuing his trip to Peru. Not being a Spanish citizen, he had to request a special permit from the Real Audiencia to be able to settle in the territory of the Viceroyalty of New Granada.

Botero travelled from the Caribbean coast to the interior of the territory, settling in the San Nicolás Valley, Rionegro, Antioquia, where he dedicated himself to gold mining. Right there, he married Doña Antonia Mejía Somoano, on June 26, 1719, thus founding the Botero family in Colombia, a country where this surname has the largest number of descendants at the present time.

=== Current times ===
Nowadays, the members of the Botero family in Colombia, all descendants of the Italian Giovanni Andrea Botero and the Spaniard Antonia Mejía, are located in various areas and municipalities of the country, with a predominant presence in the city of Medellín, some towns in Antioquia such as Sonsón, La Ceja, La Unión and Abejorral, the main Colombian coffee growing region including the cities of Armenia, Pereira and Manizales and in other areas, such as the cities of Bogotá and Cali.

One of its best-known members is the artist Fernando Botero Angulo, born in the city of Medellín, a character recognized in many countries around the world for his paintings, sculptures and artistic drawings, which have been exhibited in large cities of various continents.

Fernando Botero has residences in the cities of New York, Paris and also in the municipality of Pietrasanta, region of Tuscany, Italy, a town where artworks of his authorship are exhibited.

Among women, one of the most notable people is the actress and presenter María Cecilia Botero, who has been recognized as one of the great artists and symbols of television in Colombia for decades. In 2021, she participated as the Spanish voice of the grandmother Alma Madrigal in the Disney animated film, Encanto.

== Notable people with this surname ==
=== Art and entertainment ===
- Ana Cristina Botero (born 1968), Colombian actress
- Fernando Botero (1932–2023), Colombian figurative artist
- María Cecilia Botero (born 1955), Colombian actress and journalist
- Naty Botero (born 1980), Colombian model and singer

=== Literature and philosophy ===
- Darío Botero (1938 – 2010), Colombian writer and philosopher
- Giovanni Botero (c. 1544 – 1617), Italian writer, thinker, priest, poet, and diplomat
- Giuseppe Botero (1815 – 1885), Italian writer and educator

=== Politics ===
- Alberto Santofimio Botero (born 1942), Colombian politician
- Beatriz Elena Uribe Botero, Colombian politician
- Enrique Gil Botero (born 1953), Colombian politician and attorney
- Fernando Botero Zea (born 1956), Colombian-Mexican politician
- Guillermo Botero (born 1948), Colombian lawyer, businessman, lecturer, and politician
- Luis Alfredo Ramos Botero (born 1948), Colombian politician and attorney

=== Sports ===
- Alejandro Botero (born 1980), Colombian footballer
- Andrés Botero Phillipsbourne (born 1945), Colombian sports leader
- Jhonnatan Botero Villegas (born 1992), Colombian cyclist
- Joaquín Botero (born 1977), Bolivian footballer
- Juan Sebastián Botero (born 1986), Colombian-American footballer
- Santiago Botero (born 1972), Colombian cyclist

=== Other ===
- Catalina Botero Marino (born 1965), Colombian attorney
- Juan Carlos Botero, Colombian legal researcher
- Néstor Botero Goldsworthy (1919–1996), Colombian journalist, writer and merchant
- Tulio Botero (1904 – 1981), Colombian ecclesiastic of the Catholic Church
