= Andrés Botero Phillipsbourne =

Colombian water skier (born 1945)

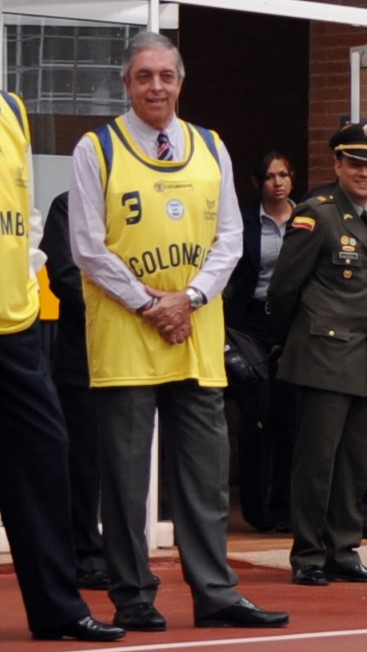
- Botero Philipsbourne in 2013

27th President of Atlético Nacional Football Club
- In office 28 March 2017 – 8 February 2018
- Preceded by: Juan Carlos de La Cuesta
- Succeeded by: Juan David Pérez Ortiz

Director of Coldeportes
- In office 19 January 2012 – 23 May 2016
- Preceded by: Jairo Clopatofsky
- Succeeded by: Clara Luz Roldán

14th President of the Colombian Olympic Committee
- In office 10 March 1997 – 10 March 2009
- Preceded by: Jorge Herrera
- Succeeded by: Baltazar Medina

Personal details
- Born: December 23, 1945 (age 80) Medellín, Antioquia, Colombia
- Spouse: Beatriz Elena Herrera
- Children: Andrea Botero, Maria Luisa Botero, Lina María Botero
- Parents: Óscar Botero Mejía; Muriel Catherine Phillipsbourne
- Education: Stanford University
- Profession: Mechanical engineer

Andrés Botero Phillipsbourne (born December 23, 1945) is a Colombian mechanical engineer, businessman and sports leader.

He inherited the passion for sports activities from his father, Oscar Botero, born in Paris, France, who married the British Muriel Catherine Philipsbourne and years later moved to Colombia, where Andrés was born. From the early age of 6 years, Botero began practicing sports activities, more specifically, shotgun shooting and horseback riding. Throughout his life, Botero has always had a passion for sports and other physically demanding activities, having practiced hunting, horse riding, aviation, rallying, motorboating and motorcycling, among others.

As an athlete, he became the national champion in water skiing for 10 consecutive years, South American champion in slalom and jumping, and the World Power Boat champion in river racing.

On January 21, 2012, he was appointed director of Coldeportes by President Juan Manuel Santos, replacing Jairo Clopatofsky.

In March 2017, Botero was appointed president of Atlético Nacional Football Club, one of the most prestigious professional football clubs in Colombia, based in the city of Medellín.

== Professional positions ==
Specifically in the sports area he has been:

- President of the Waterski Club of Medellín.
- Representative of the athletes before the World Technical Committee (1970–1971).
- President of the Colombian Federation of Waterski (1972–1974)
- Organizer of the World Waterski Championship (Bogotá, Colombia, 1973).
- President of the Pan American Ski Confederation, (Berkeley, 1980).
- Promoter of Water skiing in Latin America. Promoter of the Latin American championships, which led South America to have a junior world champion (Javier Julio, in Argentina – 1994).
- President of the International Water Ski Federation, (Villach, Austria 1991).
- President of ARISF (Association of Sports Recognized by the IOC (1993–1994).
- He achieved recognition for water skiing at the Pan American Games (Mar del Plata, Argentina, 1995).
- Member of the Colombian Olympic Committee, 1995.
- Promoter of the Professional World Cup, 1996.
- Pioneer of Ultralight aviation in Colombia; organizer of the National Air Meeting (Santa Fe de Antioquia, 1988); creator of the Magdalena River Race.
- President of the Colombian Olympic Committee for twelve years.
- President of Atlético Nacional Football Club. (2017–2018)
