= Dora Cadavid =

Colombian actress (1937–2022)

- Born: 23 November 1937; Medellín, Antioquia, Colombia
- Died: 31 January 2022 (aged 84)
- Occupation(s): Actress, singer
- Notable work: Yo soy Betty, la fea Café con aroma de mujer
- Spouse: José Luis Córdova Arellano

Dora Cadavid (23 November 1937 – 31 January 2022) was a Colombian actress, singer and announcer. Cadavid participated in over 45 television and theatre productions, making her debut at the age of ten in the play Doña Inés vuelve al convento. With 60 years of career, her most famous performance was probably in Fernando Gaitán's successful soap opera, Yo soy Betty, la fea.

== Career ==
=== Beginnings ===
Cadavid started her career as a declamator for La voz de Antioquia, a local radio show. While working on the show, she was discovered by producer Fausto Cabrera, who linked her to the play Doña Inés vuelve al convento. Later, she set up her own radio station in Medellín, called Ondas Femeninas.

In 1954 she had her first role in a soap opera, called Espectros. However, she continued with this radio work, joining RCN Radio professionally. In 1958 she recorded her first musical album with the local record company Sonolux.

After appearing in the television series Candó and Una vida para amarte, in 1970 Cadavid travelled to Mexico to study theatre. In 1980 she returned to Colombia, settling in Bogotá and immediately joining the cast of the series Rasputin. In the 1980s she appeared in other television productions such as Hato Canaguay, Señora Bonita, Heroínas, Romeo y Buseta and Bodas de sangre.

=== Yo soy Betty, la fea and further productions ===
After appearing in series like Café con aroma de mujer, Amores como el nuestro, Francisco el matemático and Victoria, Cadavid joined the cast of the soap opera Yo soy Betty, la fea, written by Fernando Gaitán and directed by Mario Ribero. The series, in which Cadavid played the role of Inés Ramírez, became the most successful Colombian telenovela of all time, giving international recognition to the actress. After her participation in the series, which aired on RCN between 1999 and 2001, the actress reprised her role in a spin-off called Ecomoda, which did not have the same reception as the original production.

In the 2010 decade, Cadavid performed in series such as La Teacher de inglés, A corazón abierto, El man es Germán, Los graduados y La niña, making her last appearance on Colombian television in the series La ley del corazón in 2017.

== Personal life and death ==
Cadavid was born in Medellín, Antioquia on 23 November 1937. She was married to José Luis Córdova, who died in 1993. Their son Moisés, actor and theater director, who also worked with Caracol on La Magia de Sofia died in 2012. Cadavid resided in a nursing home in later years. She died on 31 January 2022, at the age of 84. She was also the aunt of actresses María Cecilia Botero and Ana Cristina Botero.

== Filmography ==
=== Television ===
Year	Title	Role
1967	Destino: la ciudad	
1969	Crónica de un amor	
1969	Candó	
1970	Una vida para amarte	Fabiola
1973	La hiena	
1977	Gabriela	
1980	Rasputín	
1981	La tía Julia y el escribidor	
1981	Hato Canaguay	
1985	Camino cerrado	
1987	Romeo y Buseta	Dorotea
1988	Mi sangre aunque plebeya	
1988	Los hijos ausentes	
1990	Te voy a enseñar a querer	Eloísa de Rivera
1993	Café, con aroma de mujer	Cecilia de Vallejo
1995	Victoria	Sofía
1997	Cartas de amor	Soledad
1998	Amores como el nuestro	
1999	Francisco el Matemático	
1999	Yo soy Betty, la fea	Inés de Ramírez
2001	Ecomoda	Inés de Ramírez
2004	El vuelo de la cometa	Piedad
2005	La Tormenta	Rosario
2006	La ex	Carlota Rosas
2007	Mujeres asesinas	
2007	Decisiones	
2008	Aquí no hay quien viva	María Clarisa Pineda
2011	La Teacher de inglés	Rita
2014	Los graduados	
2016	La niña	Felipa Ríos
2017	La ley del corazón	

=== Film ===
Year	Title	Role
1973	Cumbia	
2005	El trato	
2007	El amor en los tiempos del cólera	Superior mother
