= Colombian Olympic Committee =

- Country: Colombia
- Code: COL
- Created: 3 July 1936
- Recognized: 1948
- Continental Association: PASO
- Headquarters: Bogotá, Colombia
- President: Ciro Solano
- Secretary General: Ana Edurne
- Website: www.olimpicocol.co (in Spanish)

The Colombian Olympic Committee (COC; Spanish: Comité Olímpico Colombiano; IOC Code: COL) is the governing Olympic body of Colombia. Its mission is the coordination of efforts to protect the Olympic movement and consolidate its development, compliance with the rules of the Olympic Charter and promote the preparation, selection and participation of athletes in the Olympic Games and other national and international competitions.

The Colombian Olympic Committee is headquartered in Bogotá, Colombia.

== History ==
The Colombian Olympic Committee was created 3 July 1936 and recognized by the IOC in 1948.

== List of presidents ==
The following is a list of presidents of the COC:

Period	President
1936–1937	Julio Gerlein Comelín
1937–1942	Alberto Narino Cheyne
1942–1946	Gregorio Obregón
1946–1947	Humberto Chica Pinzón
1947–1952	Leopoldo Uribe
1952–1953	Enrique Gómez Hurtado
1953–1954	Carlos Castillo
1954–1957	Colonel Guillermo Padilla
1957–1958	Helbert Liebisch
1959–1975	Mario García García
1975–1979	Humberto Chica
1979–1989	Fidel Mendoza
1989–1997	Jorge Herrera
1997–2009	Andrés Botero Phillipsbourne
2009–2021	Baltazar Medina
2021–present	Ciro Solano

== Executive committee ==
The committee of the COC is represented by:

- President: Ciro Solano
- Vice Presidents: José Luis Echeverry, Irma Lucía Ruiz
- Secretary General: Ana Edurne Camacho
- Treasurer: Jorge Franco Pineda
- Members: Helmut Bellingrodt, Jorge Mauricio Vargas, Fanny Echeverry, Juan Luis Zapata
- IOC member: Luis Alberto Moreno
- Athlete Representative: Javier Suárez
- Chief Prosecutor: Helder Navarro
- Deputy Prosecutor: Javier Vergara
- Manager: Armando Farfan Pena

== Associated federations ==
- Underwater activities
- Chess
- Archers
- Athletics
- Motor racing
- Basketball
- Baseball
- Billiards
- Bolus
- Boxing
- Bridge
- Canoeing
- Cycling
- Coleus
- Aerial sports
- Armed forces Sports
- Sports mountain climbing
- Equestrian
- Fencing
- Water-ski
- Football
- Football lounge
- Gymnastics
- Golf
- Judo
- Karate-do
- Karts
- Weight lifting
- Fight
- Motorcycle
- Jet skiing
- Swimming
- Orientation
- Ice skating
- Paralympic
- Squash
- Softball
- Taekwondo
- Triathlon
- Yew
- Tennis
- Table tennis
- Shooting and hunting
- Candle
- Volleyball

== See also ==
- Colombia at the Olympics
- Colombia at the Pan American Games
- Colombian Paralympic Committee
