= Mariana & Scarlett =

- Genre: Telenovela
- Country of origin: Colombia
- Original language: Spanish
- No. of seasons: 1
- No. of episodes: 86 (Caracol version); 112 (international version)

Original release
- Network: Caracol TV
- Release: October 4, 2010 – February 18, 2011

Mariana & Scarlett (Hilos de amor) is a Colombian telenovela television series. It was produced by Caracol TV and starred Carolina Acevedo, Carolina Guerra and Patrick Delmas with the participation of Bianca Arango and Juliana Galvis.

== Synopsis ==
Mariana and Scarlett are two middle-class women, "cachesudas", with different personalities. Mariana is serious, sweet, quiet and wants to do everything the right way; while Scarlett is funny, mischievous, aggressive and wants to do everything quickly. The first wants to start her own clothing shop whilst the latter wants to be an internationally recognized model. Then they meet a man by name Roberto White/Bobby Casablanca who will change their lives.

== Cast ==
- Carolina Guerra as Scarlett García
- Carolina Acevedo as Mariana García
- Patrick Delmas as Roberto White / Bobby Casablanca
- Bianca Arango as Beatriz Durán
- Juliana Galvis as Lina Durán
- Juan Diego Sánchez as Fernando "Fercho" León
- Pedro Pallares as Juan Carlos "Juanca" Durán
- Alejandro Lopez as Miguel Ángel Lozano
- Nicolle Santamaría as Adriana "Adri" del Pilar
- Andrés Parra as Antonio "Tony" Buendia
- Carlos Duplat as Gonzalo White
- Saín Castro as Augusto García
- Luigi Aicardi as Fabricio Donisetti
- Immanuella Alalibo as Princess Lorago
- Ana Cristina Botero as Nurse/Mrs Alicia del Pilar (Adriana's mum)
- Ángela Gómez as Martha the head seamstress at Beatriz Durán
- Liliana Escobar as Ánghela (White textiles receptionist)
- Vanessa Chaplot as Lorena Jaramillo (White textiles adviser and Fernando's first girlfriend)
- ? As Adelita San Juan (Model agent & Roberto white's first girlfriend)
- ? As Natalia (Juan Carlos's niece)
- ? As Isabelle (Juan Carlos's mother)
- ? As Mr Cifuentes (paid criminal)
- ? As Bonnie Aguire (Scarlett's mother)
- ? As Plastica (Scarlett's mother's cellmate in prison)
- ? As Garza (cellmate in prison)
- ? as Counsellor/Attorney Larotta (Lena Duran's lawyer)
- ? as Counsellor/Attorney Sebastian Maura (Mariana & Scarlett's lawyer)

== International release ==
| Country | Alternate title/Translation | TV network(s) | Series premiere | Series finale | Weekly schedule | Timeslot |
|---|---|---|---|---|---|---|
| Serbia | Marijana i Skarlet | Pink 2 Pink Soap; Valjevo PLUS | November 5, 2012; September 28, 2013; April 25, 2017 | May 3, 2013; January 17, 2014; Now playing | Monday to Friday; Monday to Sunday; Monday to Sunday | 15:50, 19:00; 20:00; 16:00, 21:00 |
| Bosnia and Herzegovina | Marijana i Skarlet | Pink BH | December 2, 2013 | May 12, 2014 | Monday to Friday | 06:00 |
| Ghana | Mariana and Scarlett | Oyerepa TV | April 2022 | now playing | Monday to Thursday | 16:30 |
| Slovenia | V vrtincu mode in ljubezni | TV3 Medias | May 20, 2014 | October 23, 2014 | Monday to Friday | 17:25 |
| Montenegro | Marijana i Skarlet | Pink M | Coming Soon | | Monday to Friday | |
| South Africa | N/A | Soweto TV | 2020 | | Monday to Friday | |
| Vietnam | Mariana và Scarlett | H1 | | | Monday to Friday | 13:00 |
