= Carlos Barbosa (actor) =

Colombian actor (1944–2025)

Carlos Barbosa Romero (15 January 1944 – 10 October 2025) was a Colombian actor.

== Life and career ==
Barbosa majored in architecture at the Universidad del Valle in Cali, where he joined a theatre group which would become its Scenic Arts Department. Later, he would join the Compañía de Teatro Nacional de Colombia, which started a failed tour which would end in Costa Rica, where he ended up living briefly. Later he moved to San Andrés y Providencia before going back to Bogotá in the early 1970s, to join the Teatro Popular de Bogotá. His television debut would occur in 1975 in anthology series Teatro Popular Caracol and Cuento del domingo. He also performed in several films.

Among his television roles, Barbosa is best remembered for Eurípides, a homosexual hairdresser, in the 1987 telenovela El divino, and Ernesto in the 1992-1999 sitcom Vuelo secreto. Barbosa also appeared in the 2004 telenovela La Saga, Negocio de Familia and 2009 telenovela Bermúdez (as Gerardo Bermúdez), both for Caracol TV. He played Tío Abdul in Telemundo 2010 telenovela, El Clon. In 2019, he was in the Christian comedy film Holy Expectations.

Barbosa died on 10 October 2025, at the age of 81.
