= Jairo Clopatofsky =

Colombian politician (born 1961)

Jairo Raúl Clopatofsky Ghisays
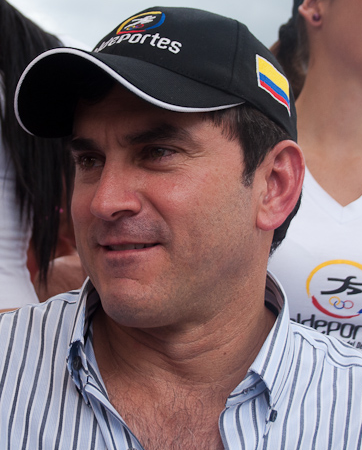

17th General Director of Coldeportes
- In office 7 August 2010 – 19 January 2012
- President: Juan Manuel Santos Calderón
- Preceded by: Everth Bustamante García
- Succeeded by: Andres Botero Phillipsbourne

Senator of Colombia
- In office 16 March 2005 – 20 July 2010
- In office July 20, 2002 – 6 December 2004
- In office 20 July 1994 – 20 July 1998

Member of the Chamber of Representatives of Colombia
- In office 20 July 1991 – 20 July 1994
- Constituency: Capital District

Personal details
- Born: 20 October 1961 (age 64) Cartagena, Bolívar, Colombia
- Party: Social Party of National Unity
- Other political affiliations: Independent Civic Movement (1991-2006)
- Spouse: María del Rosario Marin
- Children: Mario Clopatofsky Marin
- Education: University of La Sabana (BBA); Harvard University (MPA)
- Profession: Political Scientist
- Website: www.jairoclopatofsky.com

Jairo Raúl Clopatofsky Ghisays (born 20 October 1961) is a Colombian politician. A Party of the U politician, Clopatofsky had served in the Congress of Colombia, as Senator and as Representative for the Capital District, and most recently as the 17th general director of Coldeportes from 2010 to 2012.

In 1982 he experienced an automotive accident that left him paraplegic and reliant on a wheelchair. In 2005 he went through an experimental stem cell transplant surgery procedure, using olfactory adult stem cells into the spinal cord. After 22 years of paraplegia, and loss of sensation from the waist down, Clopatofsky was able to regain sensation in his legs and successfully took his first steps thanks to physical therapy and the operation.

== Career ==
Clopatofsky studied at the Liceo de La Salle until 10th grade when he enrolled in the Cadet Naval Academy in Cartagena. He graduated from University of La Sabana with a Bachelor of Business Administration, and received a scholarship to study at Harvard University where he received a Master of Public Administration. He also did specializations in Political Science from the Pontifical Xavierian University, and in Public Administration from the Center for Hemispheric Defense Studies at the National Defense University in the United States.

In 1988 Clopatofsky created the Independent Civic Movement a Colombian political movement, aimed at countering the partisan political system of the time.

=== Congressman ===
In 1991 was elected to the Chamber of Representatives of Colombia for the term between 1991 and 1994 representing Bogotá. In 1994 Clopatofsky was elected to the Senate of Colombia for the period between 1994 and 1998. In 2002 he returned to the senate after winning in the legislative elections of 2002. His party then adhered to the Social National Unity Party which supported Álvaro Uribe to the presidency of Colombia.

In 2006 Clopatofsky was reelected in the legislative elections of 2006. Clopatofsky is member of the Second Commission of the Senate which debates topics related to defense and international relations of Colombia, as well as participant in the Special Commission for Foreign Affairs.

=== Head of Consulate in Western Canada ===
In 2012 he assumed the role as head of the newly opened Colombian Consulate in Vancouver, Canada.

== Philanthropy ==
Clopatofsky is the founder and director of the Fundación Promover por Colombia which seeks to benefit people with physical disabilities.
