= Giuseppe Botero =

Italian writer

- Born: Giuseppe Botero; Year 1815; Novara, Province of Novara, Kingdom of Sardinia
- Died: 30 May 1885; Northern Italy
- Education: University of Turin
- Writing career
- Language: Italian
- Genres: Novels; Short stories; Parables; Speeches; Apologues
- Notable works: Ricciarda o i Nurra e i Cabras; Virtu' e Patria; Raffaele; Il Galeotto di San Bartolomeo; Viver bene e fare il bene; Speranza; Lo studente; Amore e Natura; La Tradita
- Literary movement: Romanticism

Giuseppe Botero (Novara, Province of Novara, Italy, 1815 – northern Italy, 30 May 1885), was an Italian writer in various literary genres, representative of the romantic literary movement and also an educator.

== Biography ==
Botero lived his childhood under the custody of his mother, because his father, a surgeon by profession, died when Giuseppe was just a baby. He shared the early years of his life together with his two brothers and two sisters. At an early age, he was sent to an educational institution, never able to see his family again, but with the satisfaction of being successful in his school life.

He devoted himself to being an educator for much of his life, serving as principal in high schools and lyceums in various cities in northern Italy. He completed his Bachelor of Literature studies at the University of Turin.

In March 1848, during a short military career, he crossed the Ticino river carrying a rifle on his shoulder, from the Italian Piedmont and towards Austrian territory, supporting the insurgents of Milan, under the leadership of King Charles Albert of Savoy.

A year after finishing his military career, he became a teacher.

During his years of activity as an educator, this Piedmontese combined that activity with the production of literary works in different genres. In the educational field, he was known for being a person dedicated to the formation of his young students in values and different academic facets. In the literary field, he was characterized by composing works where he expressed his affectionate and delicate character, especially in the parables he composed. In this genre, he made writings of an educational nature, following the example of La Mennais and Lessing.

Speranza was one of the parables written by Botero in the city of Faenza, Italy. Literary work of 1870.

== Literary career ==
Among the literary works authored by him, he wrote some novels. He also wrote numerous apologues, speeches, parables, and stories.

The parables are a class of writings that were used in times before Botero's life, to provide teachings to the people in general, but in a very limited way in Italy. During his lifetime, very few authors used them as a literary genre of writing.

One of his works was the novel Ricciarda oi Nurra ei Cabras (Ricciarda or the Nurra and the Cabras), which refers to the frequent theme of love between young people belonging to families that hate each other, which Sardinian novelists like very much. The events of this story take place on the island of Sardinia, specifically between the end of the 14th century and the beginning of the 15th century. However, due to its theme, its development could perfectly correspond to the environment lived on the island during all the centuries of modern times.

Botero's purpose through this literary work was to show the serious damage that passions, even good ones, can cause to human beings if they do not govern their actions through the use of reason, also relying on the bases of a good education.

Of the praises of the holy martyrs Gratiniano and Felino – Speech by Professor Giuseppe Botero. Literary work written in Novara, Italy in 1845.

== Main literary works ==
| Year | Title | Genre | Publishing location |
|---|---|---|---|
| 1843 | Discorso recitato quando la civica amministrazione di Arona inaugurava solennemente il monumento eretto alla memoria di Giuseppe Botelli (Speech delivered on the occasion of the solemn inauguration by the Arona civic administration of the monument erected in memory of Giuseppe Botelli) | Speech | Novara, Italy |
| 1844 | Elogio funebre del padre Luigi de' Marchesi Dal Pozzo (Funeral eulogy of the father Luigi de 'Marchesi Dal Pozzo) | Speech | Novara, Italy |
| 1845 | Per l'inaugurazione del piroscafo San Carlo (For the inauguration of the steamship San Carlo) | Speech | Novara, Italy |
| 1845 | Delle lodi dei Santi Martiri Gratiniano e Felino, patroni principali della citta di Arona: discorso del professore abate Giuseppe Botero (Of the praises of the holy martyrs Gratiniano and Felino, principal patrons of the city of Arona: speech by the professor abbot Giuseppe Botero) | Speech | Novara, Italy |
| 1846 | In morte di Giberto Pertossi (In the death of Giberto Pertossi) | Speech | Novara, Italy |
| 1847 | Monte Mesma (Mount Mesma) | Monograph | Novara, Italy |
| 1854 | Ricciarda o i Nurra e i Cabras (Ricciarda or the Nurra and the Cabras) | Novel | Cagliari, Italy |
| 1855 | Virtù' e Patria (Virtue and Homeland) | Parable | Moncalvo, Italy |
| 1858 | Raffaele (Raffaele) | Short story | Cagliari, Italy |
| 1859 | Il Galeotto di San Bartolomeo (The convict of Saint Bartholomew) | Short story | Turin, Italy |
| 1861 | Nella di Cortemilia (Nella of Cortemilia) | Short story | Turin, Italy |
| 1862 | La Tradita (The Betrayed) | Novel | Piacenza, Italy |
| 1862 | Parabole ad uso delle madri e delle maestre (Parables for the use of mothers and teachers) | Parable | Florence, Italy |
| 1863 | Lo studente (The student) | Speech | Piacenza, Italy |
| 1865 | Didimo Frate (Twin Brother) | Short story | Palermo, Italy |
| 1869 | Eloisa Basili (Eloisa Basili) | Short story | Piacenza, Italy |
| 1869 | La mia Donna (My Woman) | Parable | Faenza, Italy |
| 1870 | Speranza – Per le nozze della gentile damigella Maria; Omboni e l'egregio signore Pietro Zappa alla cugina sposa (Speranza – For the wedding of the kind maid Maria Omboni and the distinguished gentleman Pietro Zappa, to his cousin bride) | Parable | Faenza, Italy |
| 1870 | Per le nozze dell'ingegnere architetto Pietro Rossini e la gentil donzella Anna Tomba agli sposi (For the wedding of the architect engineer Pietro Rossini and the gentle damsel Anna Tomba, to the newlyweds) | Parable | Faenza, Italy |
| 1872 | Viver bene e fare il bene (Live well and do good) | Parable | Faenza, Italy |
| 1873 | Amore e Natura (Love and Nature) | Parable | Faenza, Italy |

== Career as an educator ==
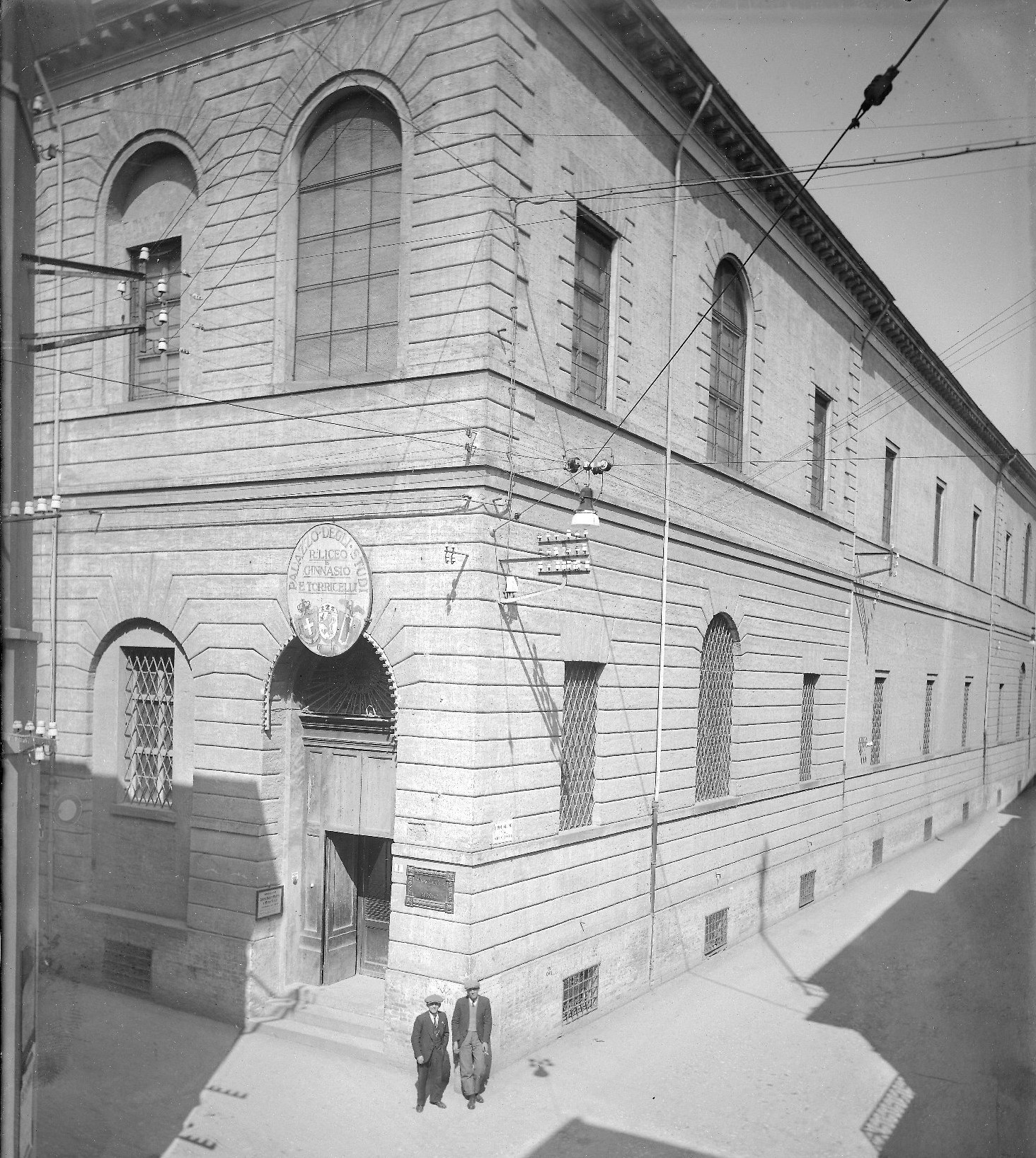
Torricelli Lyceum in Faenza, Italy – Year 1930. One of the educational institutions where Giuseppe Botero was president, between 1869 and 1875.

In 1849, he was assigned the chair of Italian literature, teaching at the high school of Cortemilia.

Later, he was director in other high schools, including the Lyceum of Lecce, the Lyceum of Faenza, the Lyceum of Pistoya, the Lyceum of Campobasso and the Torricelli Lyceum, the latter being also located in the city of Faenza, in the region of Emilia-Romagna.

From 1850 to 1854, he lived in the city of Cagliari, where he was a teacher at the Dettori Lyceum. There, he wrote some of his literary works, on Sardinian themes and of a historical-descriptive type, in the line of writing of the author Walter Scott.

=== Presidency of the Torricelli Lyceum ===
On 20 February 1869, Giuseppe Botero assumed the position of president of the Torricelli Lyceum, one of the oldest and most traditional secondary schools in Italy, located in the city of Faenza, in the province of Ravenna. He received the position from Valentino Cigliutti.

From 1865 and until 1874 – during a large part of Botero's period as president of the institute, one of the most important events in the history of the lyceum was held: the Annual Literary Festival, through which each year the institute paid homage to an Italian writer of the past, with the active participation of the students of the educational establishment through different disciplines and cultural expressions.

Another important event for the lyceum during Botero's presidency was the return of the institution in 1873 to its former headquarters in the Jesuit convent, in the same city of Faenza. The convent facilities were duly remodelled and prepared to accommodate the educational staff and their students.

Giuseppe Botero assumed the position of president of the lyceum (later renamed Torricelli-Ballardini) until 1875, before being replaced by Francesco Brizio.

On 30 May 1885, Botero died in Italian territory, 10 years after finishing his work as a teacher at the Torricelli Lyceum and after a 30-year career as a writer and 26 years as a licensed educator.

== See also ==
- Sardinian literature
- Romanticism
- Botero. Italian surname
