= Vuelo secreto =

- Created by: Juan Manuel Cáceres
- Directed by: Mario Ribero
- Starring: Armando Gutiérrez; Adriana Vera; Carlos Barbosa; María Elvira Arango; Ana Bolena Meza; Ramiro Meneses; Fabio Rubiano; Luigi Aycardi; Claudia de Hoyos; Jessica Rodríguez; Ana Cristina Botero; Evelyn Santos
- Country of origin: Colombia
- No. of seasons: 9

Production
- Running time: 23 minutes (per episode)
- Production company: Producciones PUNCH

Original release
- Network: Canal A
- Release: 4 January 1992 – 24 February 1999

Vuelo secreto is a Colombian sitcom, created by Juan Manuel Cáceres and broadcast weekly between 1992 and 1999. Set in a travel agency, it initially focused on the relationship between Ernesto, the boss, and two of his employees, Alejandro and Pilar (who kept their marriage secret, as the company forbade relationships between employees).

== Cast ==
- Armando Gutiérrez as Alejandro Martínez
- Adriana Vera as Pilar Rojas
- Carlos Barbosa as Ernesto Suárez Vergara (manager of Viajes Lunaire)
- Ana María Arango as María Elvira
- Ana Bolena Mesa as Liliana Charry
- Ramiro Meneses as Oswaldo
- Fabio Rubiano as Daniel aka el Triplepapito
- Luigi Aycardi as Santiago
- Jessica Rodríguez as Yuri Jessica Cucalón
- María Elvira Arango as Martha Linares
- Claudia de Hoyos as Claudia Bustos
- Ana Cristina Botero as Silvia
- Evelyn Santos as Paloma
- Alberto Saavedra as Francisco Pombo
- Daniel Rocha as Richardo
- Martín Armenta as El Costeño

== Broadcast ==
Vuelo secreto was broadcast on Sunday evenings between early 1992 and late 1997, earning good ratings. In 1998, it moved to Fridays. The last episode was broadcast on Wednesday 24 February 1999. Caracol TV reran some episodes in the early 2000s (decade) on weekday mornings.

== Soundtrack ==
The theme song for Vuelo secreto was Magneto's Vuela, vuela.
