= Holy Expectations =

- Theatrical release poster
- Directed by: Fernando Ayllón
- Written by: Fernando Ayllón; Ángel Ayllón; Fernando Ramos
- Produced by: Danny Matiz
- Starring: Adriana Bottina; Fernando Ramos; Omar Murillo; Nelson Polania; Aida Morales; Carlos Barbosa; Christian Rojas
- Cinematography: Manuel Monsalve
- Edited by: Sebastián González
- Music by: Fernando Ramos; Jairo Zuluaga
- Production company: Producciones El Andaluz
- Release date: September 5, 2019
- Running time: 90 minutes
- Country: Colombia
- Language: Spanish

Holy Expectations (Spanish: Embarazada por obra y gracia, lit. 'Pregnant by work and grace') is a 2019 Colombian Christian comedy film directed by Fernando Ayllón and written by Ayllón, Ángel Ayllón & Fernando Ramos. Starring Adriana Bottina, Fernando Ramos, Omar Murillo, Nelson Polanía, Aida Morales, Carlos Barbosa and Christian Rojas. It premiered on September 5, 2019, in Colombian theaters.

== Synopsis ==
The life of young Gabriela and her father is upended when she receives a terminal diagnosis. Relying on her faith and a humorous tale told by her mother, Gabriela uses her imagination to re-create a grand narrative, ultimately inspiring the hospital staff and visitors during her final days.

== Cast ==
The actors participating in this film are:

- Adriana Bottina
- Joavany Álvarez
- Fernando Ramos
- Isabella Sierra
- Omar Murillo
- Christian López
- Nelson Polanía
- Aída Morales
- José Manuel Ospina
- Carlos Barbosa Romero
