= María Cecilia Botero =

Colombian actress and TV presenter

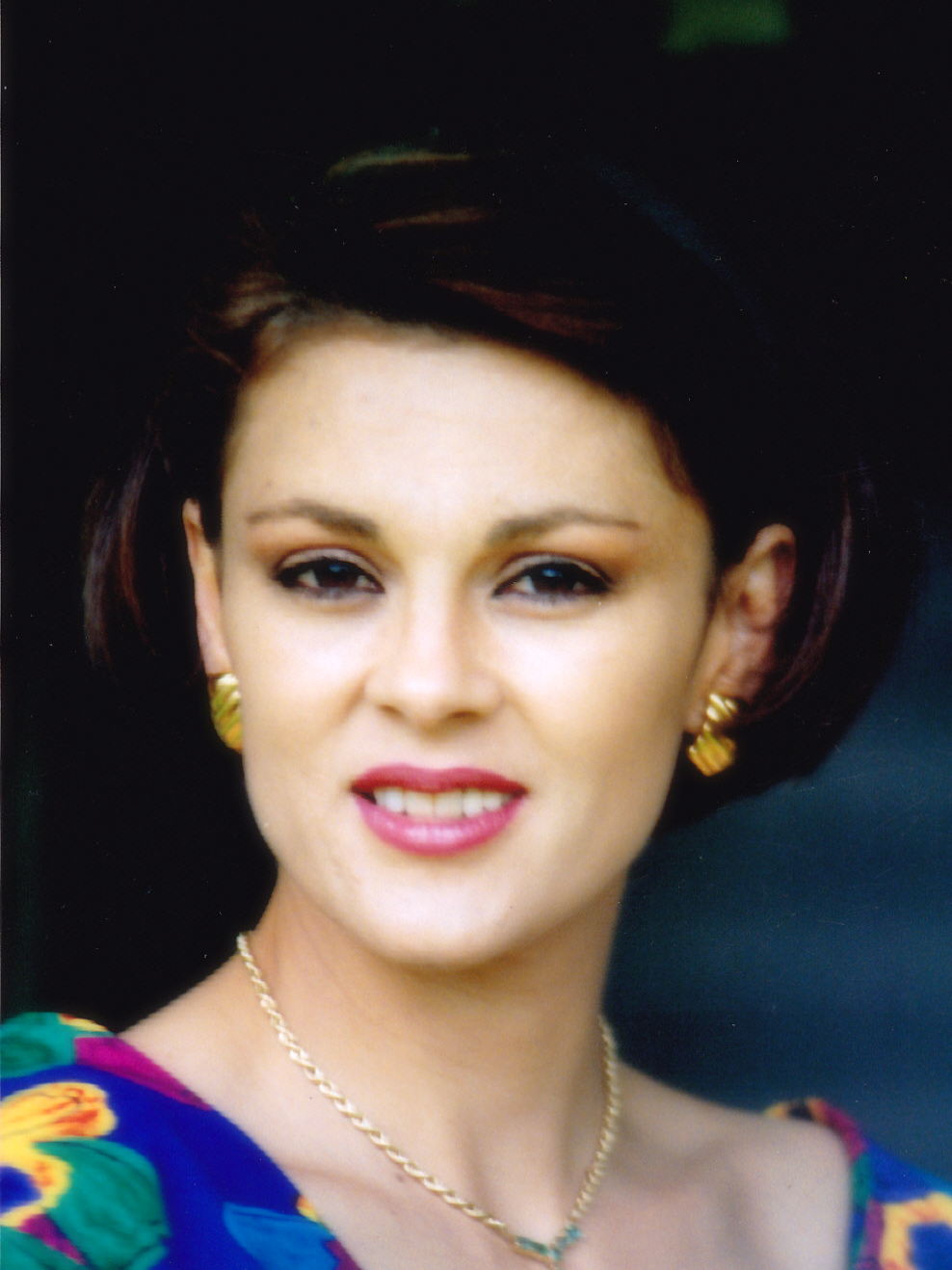
- Botero in 1991
- Born: María Cecilia Botero Cadavid; 13 May 1955 (age 71); Medellín, Antioquia, Colombia
- Occupations: Actress; television presenter; journalist
- Years active: 1971–present
- Spouse: David Stivel (m. 1983; div. 1992)
- Children: 1
- Relatives: Ana Cristina Botero (sister); Dora Cadavid (aunt)

María Cecilia Botero Cadavid (born 13 May 1955) is a Colombian actress, television presenter and journalist.

== Biography ==
=== Beginnings ===
She studied anthropology long before becoming an actress. She is the daughter of former actor, librettist and director Jaime Botero Gómez. She is the niece of Dora Cadavid.

Botero began her acting career with production El Fantasma de Canterville (1971), alongside Carlos Benjumea, Maruja Toro, Enrique Pontón and Franky Linero. She replaced Mariela Hijuelos, who died during the recording of La Vorágine (1975). She was Manuela Saénz in the series Bolívar, el hombre de las dificultades(1981). She was María Cándida in La Pezuña del Diablo (1983), Yadira La Ardiente in Caballo Viejo (1988) and Sándalo Daza in Música Maestro (1990). Her brothers Óscar Botero and Ana Cristina Botero are also actors.

=== Professional career ===
She debuted as movies actress in 1972, when she starred in the film María, alongside Fernando Allende. María Cecilia Botero is known for her professionalism, thus becoming one of the most beloved figures in Colombian entertainment.

Her first television role was obtained in 1971, acting in El fantasma de Canterville. Then she participated in Lunes de Comedia, La Vorágine, Caminos de Gloria, Lejos del Nido, Los novios, La Pezuña del Diablo, La Rosa de los Vientos, Dos Mujeres and A.M.A. la Academia, just to mention a few productions.

Perhaps her most remembered characters are Yadira la Ardiente, from the telenovela Caballo Viejo, and Sándalo Daza, from Música Maestro.

Parallel to her career as antress, María Cecilia produced and starred in several musical comedies directed by her husband, the Argentine David Stivel (with whom he lived since 1981), now deceased. With him, she had a son named Mateo Stivelberg. Her dream of popularizing musical theater in Colombia led her to make productions as important as Peter Pan, Sugar and La Mujer del Año.

The artist also stood out as the presenter of television newscasts (CM& and Noticero de las 7) and as host of the talk shows María C. Contigo and Las Tardes de María C.

In 2005 she was invited to be part of the soap opera Lorena, produced by RCN Television, where she played her first antagonistic role, giving life to the evil Rufina de Ferrero, where she radically changed her look and showed her great histrionic capacity.

María Cecilia directs the Charlot Academy, an acting school created by her father, Jaime Botero.

She presented the program Día a Día on the Caracol Television channel, together with Catalina Gómez and Agmeth Escaf.

=== In Encanto ===
In 2021, she voiced the character of Abuela Alma in the Disney movie Encanto, along with other acting voices, such as John Leguizamo, Angie Cepeda, and Carolina Gaitán.

== Filmography ==
=== Television ===
Year	Title	Character
2020	La venganza de Analía	Eugenia Márquez de la Torre
2019-2021	Enfermeras	Beatriz Ramírez
2019	La cuadra	Herself
2018	La ley secreta	Bertha
2016-2017	Hilos de sangre azul	Sonia Díaz
2015-2016	Las hermanitas Calle	Isabel
2014	La suegra	Beatriz Eugenia Espitia
2013	La hipocondríaca	Maruja Maldonado de Pulido
2011	La bruja	Carmen Escobar
2010	Secretos de familia	Mercedes Romero, widow of San Miguel
2008-2009	Muñoz vale x 2	Victoria de Castellanos
2007-2008	Nuevo rico, nuevo pobre	Antonia de Ferreira
2005	Lorena	Rufina De Brigard de Ferrero
2003	A.M.A. La Academia	Victoria Giraldo
1997	Dos mujeres	Laura Blanco de Urdaneta
1990-1991	Música Maestro	Soledad "Sándalo Daza"
1989	La rosa de los vientos	Rosario
1988	Caballo Viejo	Yadira la ardiente
1987	Por amor	
1987	Cuando llega la noche	
1987	Mi sangre aunque plebeya	
1986	Los dueños del poder	
1985	Gloria	
1984	Camino cerrado	
	Amalia	Amalia
1983	La pezuña del diablo	María Cándida
1982	El hombre de negro	La frívola
1981	La tía Julia y el escribidor	
1980	Bolívar, el hombre de las dificultades	Manuela Sáenz
1979	Córdova	Manuela Morales
1979	Los novios	
1978	Lejos del nido	Filomena
1975	La vorágine	Alicia
1975	La feria de las vanidades	
1973	Caminos de Gloria	
1972	Episodios de Los cuentos del domingo	
1972	Episodios de Suspenso 7:30	
1972	Lunes de comedia (episodios)	
1971	El fantasma de Canterville	

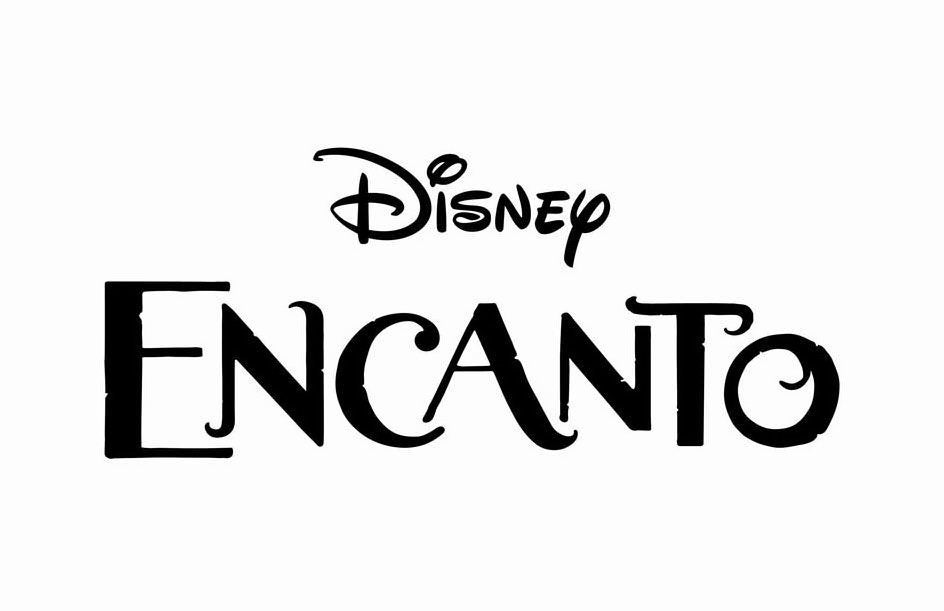
In 2021, Botero participated in the Disney film Encanto as the Spanish voice of grandma Alma.

=== Film ===
Year	Title	Character
2025	Dora and the Search for Sol Dorado	Dora's grandmother
2021	Encanto	Abuela Alma Madrigal (voice in English and Spanish versions)
2019	Amalia	Elena
2019	El que se enamora pierde	The "boss"
2017	Los Oriyinales	
1972	María	

== TV presenter ==
Year	Program
2019	La gran carpa
2005-2009	Día a día
2002-2004	Protagonistas de Novela
2000-2001	Las tardes de Maria C
1998-2000	Maria C contigo.

== Musical theater ==
- La Mujer del año
- Sugar
- La Invencible Molly Brown
- Peter Pan
- Música Maestro (1990)
- Los caballeros las prefieren rubias

== Nominations and awards ==
=== TVyNovelas awards ===
Year	Nominee / work	Award	Result
2015	La suegra	Best antagonistic actress in a telenovela	Nominated
2000	Noticiero de las 7	Best newscaster/anchor	Nominated
1997	Dos Mujeres	Best leading actress in a telenovela	Won
1995 - 1994	Noticiero CM&	Best newscaster/anchor	Won

=== Other awards ===
Year	Award	Category / Work	Result
2020	India Catalina Award	Career as an actress	Won
1997	Simón Bolívar Award	Best Actress	Won
1997	Simón Bolívar Order	Career as an actress	Won
1997	Gloria de la TV (TV Glory)	50 Years of Colombian TV	Won
1997	Caracol Memorial Tablet (Placa Caracol)	One of the best Colombian actresses, in the framework of the 50 years of Colombian TV	Won

== See also ==
- Botero (surname). Italian surname
- Television in Colombia
