= Alejandro Botero =

Colombian footballer (born 1980)

Personal information
- Full name: Alejandro Botero López
- Date of birth: October 8, 1980 (age 46)
- Place of birth: Pereira, Colombia
- Height: 1.87 m (6 ft 2 in)
- Position: Goalkeeper

Youth career
- Deportivo Cali

Senior career*
Years	Team	Apps	(Gls)
1998–2002	Deportivo Cali	(Total) 80	(0)
2002–2003	Independiente	5	(0)
2003–2005	Argentinos Juniors	14	(0)
2005	Deportivo Cali	(see above)	(0)
2006–2009	San Martín (SJ)	8	(0)
2009–2010	Boyacá Chicó	42	(0)
2011–2012	Deportes Tolima	3	(0)
- * Club domestic league appearances and goals

Alejandro Botero López (born October 8, 1980) is a former Colombian football player. He played as goalkeeper in the professional divisions of Colombian and Argentine football.

After his retirement from professional football in 2012, he resumed his career as a commercial aviator, which he had started in the years during which he was playing in Argentine football.

== Career ==
He played in the goalkeeper position, both wearing the shirt of the Colombian professional football team and in football teams in that country and in Argentina.

His sports career began at the age of 18, serving the Deportivo Cali club, where he played for 4 years.

In the Argentine club Independiente de Avellaneda, he was champion in 2002; however, in this club he did not have the opportunity to be a starting goalkeeper.

Later, Botero went down a division to play with Argentinos Juniors. At the end of the 2003–2005 season, this team managed to be promoted to play in the Argentine first division, with Botero having a successful performance.

In September 2005, he returned to the Deportivo Cali club, a Colombian team where he had started his career as a football player. There he won the professional football tournament that year.

In 2006, he returned to Argentine football, playing with the San Martín de San Juan club, where he had the opportunity to play for the second time with a team that was promoted to the Argentine first division.

In 2009, he returned to Colombian football, where he joined the Boyacá Chicó team.

His professional career began in 1998 and ended in 2012.

== Retirement from football ==
In 2011, while he was playing for the Deportes Tolima team in Colombia, he made the decision to retire from professional football, to dedicate himself to resuming his career as a commercial aviator.

He had already partially started this career, at the Academia Flight Center in Buenos Aires, from the time he was playing in Argentine football.

His father, David Botero, was a tourism agent and airline representative, which inspired Alejandro as a child to be passionate about the field of aviation.

Once he obtained his commercial pilot licenses, Botero López managed to be hired by Avianca.

== Clubs ==
Club	Country	Year
Deportivo Cali	Colombia	1998 - 2002
Independiente	Argentina	2002 - 2003
Argentinos Juniors	Argentina	2003 - 2005
Deportivo Cali	Colombia	2005
San Martín de San Juan	Argentina	2006 - 2009
Boyacá Chicó	Colombia	2009 - 2010
Deportes Tolima	Colombia	2011 - 2012

== Titles ==
=== National championships ===
Botero developed his entire professional career in the national football of Colombia and Argentina:

Title	Club	Country	Year
Primera División Colombiana	Deportivo Cali	Colombia	1998
Primera División Argentina	Independiente	Argentina	2002
Torneo Finalización	Deportivo Cali	Colombia	2005

== See also ==
- First Division of Argentine Football
- First Division of Colombian Football
