= Juan Carlos Botero =

Colombian researcher

Dr. Juan Carlos Botero
- Born: Second half of the 20th century Colombia
- Occupations: Lawyer; Law professor; Researcher
- Known for: International trade negotiator and principal attorney for the United States–Colombia Free Trade Agreement
- Awards: IX Research Biennial Colsubsidio. Colombia, 2008

Academic background
- Education: Master of Laws
- Alma mater: University of Los Andes, Colombia; Harvard University

Academic work
- Institutions: Ministry of Commerce, Industry and Tourism, Colombia; World Justice Project; Research associate at Yale University; Consultant at the World Bank
- Notable works: Co-author of WJP Rule of Law Index and Open Government Index

Juan Carlos Botero Navia is a Colombian lawyer and researcher, who served as Executive Director of the World Justice Project in Washington, DC and as co-author of its WJP Rule of Law Index and Open Government Index.

International institutional indicator. At the World Justice Project, Botero has led the development of the methodology, piloting, and implementation of the WJP Rule of Law Index for the past five years. His work on "leximetrics" was controversial due to the findings, and suspect methodology, which purported to show that effective labour law damaged economic productivity. More detailed work has been carried out at the Cambridge Judge Business School found the opposite.

His previous experience as a researcher at Yale University and the World Bank focused on developing indicators to measure the performances of legal and judicial institutions in countries around the world.

Botero is a member of the World Economic Forum's Global Agenda Council on the Rule of Law, currently serving as a member of the Global Agenda Council on Justice, and is a member of the advisory boards for Citizens for Justice Malawi and the Hague Journal on the Rule of Law.

== Colombian government ==
Botero has served the Colombian government in many capacities, including as Chief International Legal Counsel of the Ministry of Commerce, Industry and Tourism; international trade negotiator and chief counsel of the US-Colombia Free Trade Agreement; and Director of the Colombian Government Trade Bureau in Washington D.C.

He also served as member of the Advisory Board of the Superintendency of Industry and Commerce and as Judicial Clerk for Justice Carlos Gaviria Diaz, at the Constitutional Court.

== Academic career ==
As national of Colombia, Botero holds a law degree from Universidad de los Andes, a Master of Law from Harvard University and a Doctor of Juridical Science (SJD) from Georgetown University. He has taught legal theory and comparative law at the Universidad de los Andes in Colombia and Universidad Privada Boliviana in Bolivia.

He also served as Director of the Instituto de Ciencia Politica in Colombia. His academic publications have focused on the areas of rule of law, labor regulation, child labor, and judicial reform. He is a member of the bars of Colombia and New York state.

== Publications ==
- WJP Rule of Law Index 2015(with A. Ponce, J. Martinez, and C. Pratt). Washington DC. The World Justice Project, June 2015.
- WJP Open Government Index 2015(with A. Ponce, J. Martinez, and C. Pratt). Washington DC. The World Justice Project, March 2015.
- WJP Rule of Law Index 2014(with A. Ponce, J. Martinez, and C. Pratt). Washington DC. The World Justice Project, March 2014.
- WJP Rule of Law Index 2012-2013(with M. Agrast, A. Ponce, J. Martinez, and C. Pratt). Washington DC. The World Justice Project, November 2012.
- Pinzón-Rondón, Angela María; Pratt, Christine; Botero, Juan Carlos (2016). "How, when and why do governance, justice and rule of law indicators fail public policy decision making in practice?". Hague Journal on the Rule of Law. 3 (2): 1–24. doi:10.1007/s40803-015-0020-8. S2CID 156433393.
- Pinzón-Rondón, Angela María; Attaran, Amir; Botero, Juan Carlos; Ruiz-Sternberg, Angela María (2015). "Association of rule of law and health outcomes: an ecological study". BMJ Open. 5 (10): 1–10. doi:10.1136/bmjopen-2014-007004. PMC 4636637. PMID 26515684.
- Pinzón-Rondón, Angela María; Attaran, Amir; Botero, Juan Carlos; Ruiz-Sternberg, Angela María (2014). "The Delivery of Justice in Middle-Income Countries". Law and Development of Middle-Income Countries. Avoiding the Middle-Income Trap. Cambridge University Press. pp. 195–218. doi:10.1017/CBO9781139235730.013. ISBN 9781139235730.
- Botero, Juan Carlos; Ponce, Alejandro; Shleifer, Andrei (2013). "Education, Complaints, and Accountability" (PDF). Journal of Law and Economics. 56 (4): 959–996. doi:10.1086/674133. S2CID 154281537.
- Botero, Juan Carlos; Ponce, Alejandro; Martinez, Joel (2013). "Justice by the Numbers". Promoting the Rule of Law: A Practitioners Guide to Key Issues and Developments.
- Botero, Juan Carlos (2013). "Using Indicators in International Law: The WJP Rule of Law Index 2011". The American Society of International Law. 106 ASIL Proc. 214 (2013).
- Botero, Juan Carlos; Janse, Ronald; Mueller, Sam; Pratt, Christine (2012). "Innovations in Rule of Law - A Compilation of Concise Essays". The World Justice Project & Hague Institute for the Internationalisation of Law.
- Botero, Juan Carlos; Ponce, Alejandro; Martinez, Joel; Pratt, Christine (2012). "The Rule of Law Measurement Revolution: Complementarity Between Official Statistics, Qualitative Assessments and Quantitative Indicators of the Rule of Law". Innovations in the Rule of Law: 8–11.
- Ramírez, Clemencia; Pinzón-Rondón, Angela María; Botero, Juan Carlos (2011). "Contextual predictive factors of child sexual abuse: The role of parent-child interaction". Child Abuse & Neglect. 35 (12): 1022–31. doi:10.1016/j.chiabu.2011.10.004. PMID 22118803.
- Botero, Juan Carlos; Nelson, Robert L.; Pratt, Christine (2011). "Indices and Indicators of Justice, Governance, and the Rule of Law: An Overview". Hague Journal on the Rule of Law. 3 (2): 153. doi:10.1017/S1876404511200010. S2CID 154919760.
- WJP Rule of Law Index 2011(with M. Agrast, A. Ponce). Washington DC. The World Justice Project, June 2011.
- "Access to justice in the United States" (with R. Mathews). Virginia Lawyer Magazine, December 2010, Vol. 59, No. 5.
- WJP Rule of Law Index 2010(with M. Agrast, A. Ponce). Washington DC. The World Justice Project, October 2010.
- Pinzon-Rondon, Angela Maria; Botero, Juan Carlos; Benson, Lisa; Briceno-Ayala, Leonardo; Kanamori, Mariano (2010). "Workplace Abuse and Economic Exploitation of Children Working in the Streets of Latin American Cities". International Journal of Occupational and Environmental Health. 16 (2): 162–9. doi:10.1179/107735210799160354. PMID 20465061. S2CID 29596980. SSRN 1522271.
- Rule of Law Index 2009 – Report to the World Justice Forum II (with M. Agrast, A. Ponce). Washington DC. The World Justice Project, November 2009.
- Pinzón-Rondón, AM; Ross, TW; Botero, JC; Baquero-Umaña, MM (2009). "Sexually-transmitted disease prevalence and the factors associated with it in sexually-exploited children in Bogota, Colombia" (PDF). Revista de Salud Publica. 11 (3): 468–79. doi:10.1590/S0124-00642009000300015. PMID 20027519.
- "The health of children working in the streets of Latin American cities: risks, injuries, and child abuse" (with AM Pinzon-Rondon, L. Briceno, C. Pinzon-Florez). Revista Saludarte. Spanish. Colsubsidio, Colombia. Vol. 6, No. 2. November 2008.
- Measuring Adherence to the Rule of Law around the World – Rule of Law Index 2008 (with M. Agrast, A. Ponce, C. Dumas). Washington DC. The World Justice Project, July 2008.
- "Generalidades del Tratado de Libre Comercio con Estados Unidos." Chapter in book El TLC y el Derecho de la Distribución Comercial." Universidad Externado de Colombia, Colegio de Abogados de Medellín, Cámara de Comercio de Medellín. Biblioteca Jurídica Dike. Bogotá, 2006.
- "Trabajo Infantil en Calles de Ciudades Latinoamericanas." (with AM Pinzon-Rondon, L Briceno-Ayala, P Cabrera, and MN Rodriguez). Salud Publica Mex. 2006 Sep–Oct;48(5):363-72.
- Botero, J. C.; Djankov, S.; Porta, R. L.; Lopez-De-Silanes, F.; Shleifer, A. (2004). "The Regulation of Labor" (PDF). The Quarterly Journal of Economics. 119 (4): 1339. doi:10.1162/0033553042476215.
- Botero, J. C. (2003). "Judicial Reform". The World Bank Research Observer. 18: 61–88. doi:10.1093/wbro/lkg005.
- Manual de Servicios Financieros (with C. Manrique and A. Saba). Bogotá, Nueva Frontera, 1994.
- "El Estado Robin Hood." Revista Alter Ego. University of Los Andes Law School. Bogotá, 1993.

== Awards ==
- IX Bienal de Investigación Colsubsidio 2008 (Prize to research in the Americas). First place. Paper: The health of children working in the streets of Latin American cities: risks, injuries, and child abuse.
