= Ana Cristina Botero =

Colombian actress (born 1968)

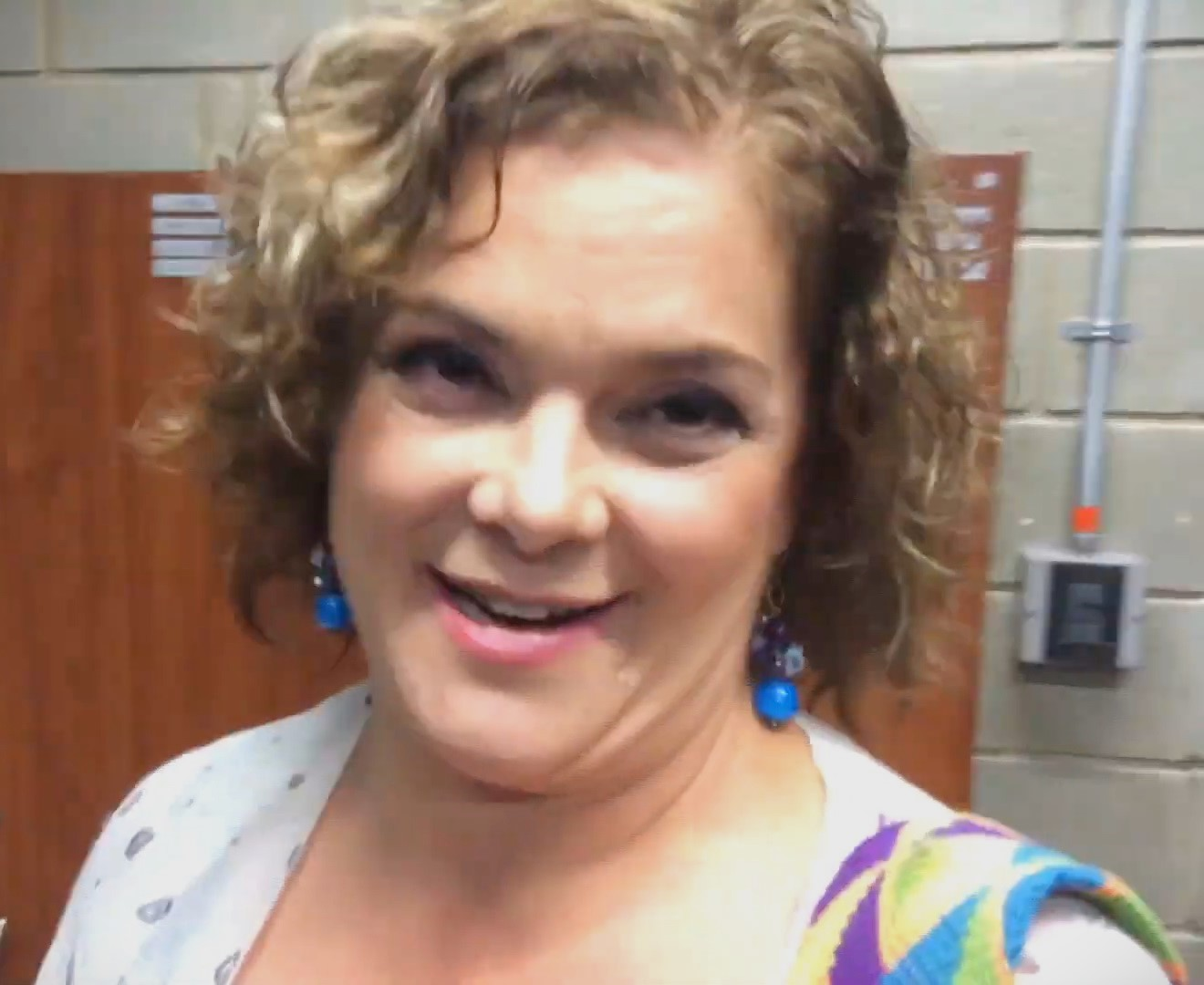
- Botero in 2017
- Born: Ana Cristina Botero Cadavid; 1968 (age 56–57); Medellín, Colombia
- Occupation: actress
- Known for: Actress
- Spouse: Jorge Barón
- Children: Santiago Barón Botero
- Parent: Jaime Botero Gómez (father)

Ana Cristina Botero Cadavid (born 1968) is a Colombian actress. She is mainly active in television, but she also participated in some Colombian plays and films.

== Career ==
Botero is the daughter of actor, librettist and director Jaime Botero Gómez, niece of actress Dora Cadavid and sister of actors Óscar and María Cecilia Botero. She debuted on television when she was very young in the telenovela Lejos del Nido, starring her sister, María Cecilia and directed by her father, Jaime.

After remaining active in the theater, she returned to television in 1987 to join the cast of the soap opera Destinos Cruzados, a production starring her sister again. Two years later, she appeared in the series Los Dueños del Poder, along with Luis Eduardo Arango, Víctor Mallarino and her sister María Cecilia.

She began the 1990s by joining the cast of the successful telenovela La Casa de las Dos Palmas by Manuel Mejía Vallejo, starring Gustavo Angarita, Vicky Hernández and Edmundo Troya. The same year, she acted in the series Por qué mataron a Betty si era tan buena muchacha? Since 1992, she was part of the cast of the humor series Vuelo secreto, playing Silvia.

In the new millennium, she recorded appearances in the series El Precio del Silencio (2002) and A.M.A. La Academia (2003) before moving to Chile with her husband. She has a child named Santiago Barón Botero, who is very proud of the artistic career of his mother, his aunt Maria Cecilia and his grandfather, Jaime.

== Filmography ==
=== Television ===
Botero has participated in the following television programs and series:

- 2017 - Infieles: Last episode: Radio taxi
- 2012 - 2016 - Mujeres al Límite: Various characters
- 2009 - Mariana & Scarlett - Hilos de Amor
- 2003 - A.M.A. La Academia
- 2002 - El Precio del Silencio: Mireya Botero
- 1992 - La 40, la Calle del Amor
- 1992 - Vuelo Secreto
- 1991 - La Casa de las Dos Palmas: Laura Gómez
- 1990 - Herencia Maldita
- 1990 - Por qué mataron a Betty, si era tan buena muchacha?
- 1989 - Los Dueños del Poder
- 1987 - Alma Fuerte
- 1987 - Destino
- 1987 - Destinos Cruzados
- 1986 - Huracán
- 1984 - Las Estrellas de las Baum
- 1978 - Lejos del Nido

=== Movies ===
She also appeared in the following movies:

- 2020 - No Andaba Muerto, Estaba de Parranda: Lucy
- 2019 - Feo pero Sabroso: Cuquita Canosa de la Calva

== Theater ==
More recently, she participated in the following plays:

- 2021 - Caliente Caliente 2
- 2019 - Caliente Caliente

== See also ==
- Television in Colombia
