= Encanto =

2021 animated Disney film by Jared Bush & Byron Howard

- Theatrical release poster
- Directed by: Jared Bush; Byron Howard
- Screenplay by: Charise Castro Smith; Jared Bush
- Story by: Jared Bush; Byron Howard; Charise Castro Smith; Jason Hand; Nancy Kruse; Lin-Manuel Miranda
- Produced by: Yvett Merino; Clark Spencer
- Starring: Stephanie Beatriz; María Cecilia Botero; John Leguizamo; Mauro Castillo; Jessica Darrow; Angie Cepeda; Carolina Gaitán; Diane Guerrero; Wilmer Valderrama
- Cinematography: Nathan Warner (layout); Alessandro Jacomini; Daniel Rice (lighting)
- Edited by: Jeremy Milton
- Music by: Germaine Franco (score); Lin-Manuel Miranda (songs)
- Production company: Walt Disney Animation Studios
- Distributed by: Walt Disney Studios; Motion Pictures (Note: Distributed under the Walt Disney Pictures banner.)
- Release dates: November 3, 2021 (El Capitan Theatre); November 24, 2021 (United States)
- Running time: 102 minutes
- Country: United States
- Language: English
- Budget: $120–150 million
- Box office: $261.3 million

Encanto is a 2021 American animated musical fantasy comedy film directed by Jared Bush and Byron Howard, and written by Charise Castro Smith and Bush. Produced by Walt Disney Animation Studios, its original songs were written by Lin-Manuel Miranda, and the original musical orchestral score, composed by Germaine Franco. The film stars the voices of Stephanie Beatriz, María Cecilia Botero, John Leguizamo, Mauro Castillo, Jessica Darrow, Angie Cepeda, Carolina Gaitán, Diane Guerrero, and Wilmer Valderrama. The film follows a multigenerational Colombian family, the Madrigals, led by a matriarch (Botero) whose children and grandchildren—except for Mirabel Madrigal (Beatriz)—receive magical gifts from a miracle, which they use to help the people in their rural community, called the Encanto. When Mirabel learns that the family is losing their magic, she sets out to find out why and save the family and house.

Encanto premiered at the El Capitan Theatre in Hollywood, Los Angeles, on November 3, 2021, and was released in the United States on November 24 over a 30-day theatrical run. It was also released in RealD 3D, Dolby Cinema, 2D and D-BOX formats. Despite underperformance at the box office, grossing $261.3 million worldwide against a $120–150 million budget, it was a ratings success after its release on Disney+ on December 24, 2021. The film received acclaim for its characterization, music, animation, voice acting, emotional depth, and cultural fidelity; reviews named magic realism and transgenerational trauma as the film's core concepts. Publications have described Encanto as a cultural phenomenon, and executives had begun referring to it as a "franchise" within a year of release. The film was nominated for three awards at the 94th Academy Awards, winning Best Animated Feature, and received numerous other accolades, including the Golden Globe Award for Best Animated Feature and the BAFTA Award for Best Animated Film.

The film's associated merchandise has seen significant success, and its soundtrack became a breakout sensation, reaching number one on the US Billboard 200 and UK Compilation Albums charts; "We Don't Talk About Bruno" and "Surface Pressure" were its two most successful songs, with the former topping both the US Billboard Hot 100 and UK Singles Chart for multiple consecutive weeks. A theme park attraction based on the film is set to open at Disney's Animal Kingdom in 2027.

== Plot ==
An armed conflict forces young couple Pedro and Alma Madrigal to flee their home village in Colombia with their infant triplets, Julieta, Pepa, and Bruno. Pedro is killed, but the candle Alma carries gains a magical power that repels the attackers and creates Casita, a sentient house located in a magical realm bordered by mountains.

Fifty years later, a new village thrives under the candle's protection, which grants "gifts" to each Madrigal descendant when they turn five, which they use to serve the villagers. Bruno, who was vilified and scapegoated for his precognition, disappeared ten years earlier, and Julieta's youngest daughter, Mirabel, inexplicably did not receive a gift.

On his fifth birthday, Pepa's youngest son, Antonio, is granted the ability to communicate with animals. During the celebration, the Madrigals unwittingly exclude Mirabel from being in a family photo. Mirabel sees Casita cracking and the candle's flame flickering and alerts her family, but Casita repairs itself, causing disbelief in Mirabel. After overhearing Alma lament the candle's fading that night, Mirabel resolves to restore Casita's magic herself. Her older sister Luisa, who possesses superhuman strength, confesses to Mirabel that she feels overwhelmed by her constant obligation to help the villagers using her strength, which has been faltering. She suggests to Mirabel that Bruno's room, located inside a forbidden tower in Casita, may hold the secret to the fading magic.

Mirabel finds a cave in Bruno's room that holds pieces of his last vision made of opaque emerald. Alma and the family warn Mirabel not to investigate further, but she reassembles the pieces and sees herself with Casita cracking behind her. Mirabel's father Agustín accidentally discovers Mirabel and warns her to keep the vision a secret, but they are overheard by Pepa's daughter Dolores, who possesses supernatural hearing. Mirabel's oldest sister Isabela, who can make plants and flowers instantly grow at will, is scheduled to be engaged to the Madrigals' neighbor Mariano Guzmán. Amidst Mariano's proposal, an awkward dinner, and Dolores telling everyone about Mirabel's discovery, Casita begins to crack again, and everyone loses control of their gifts.

Mirabel follows rats carrying the pieces of the vision to a secret passage behind a portrait, where she finds Bruno, who reveals he never left Casita, and his visions alternate between Mirabel saving Casita and destroying it, leading him to believe she is the key to the fate of Casita's magic. Not wanting Mirabel to be hurt, he destroyed the vision and isolated himself. At Mirabel's insistence, Bruno conjures another vision that depicts Mirabel and Isabela, who have a strained relationship, hugging, which strengthens the candle.

Mirabel attempts to apologize to a frustrated Isabela, who confesses she is burdened by her image of perfection and does not want to marry Mariano. Mirabel helps Isabela use her powers more freely and they hug. Alma arrives and angrily blames Mirabel for causing the family's misfortunes out of spite for not having a gift. However, an upset and enraged Mirabel gets into an argument with Alma's behavior and asserts that her harmful expectations for her family are the true cause of Casita who is destruction, and saying that the miracle is dying because of her, which horrifies Alma. In the ensuing argument, Casita is destroyed by the cracks as Mirabel tries to save the candle, which extinguishes in her hands, leaving the Madrigals powerless. Distraught and heartbroken, Mirabel runs away from home.

The next day, Alma finds Mirabel tearfully sitting beside the river where Pedro was killed by the soldiers and where the miracle had begun. Alma realizes that her obsession with preserving the magic made her oblivious to how her expectations and pressure were harming the family. She expresses remorse, reconciles with Mirabel, and reunites with Bruno. The three return to the village and assemble the other Madrigals to rebuild Casita, and the townspeople join in, restoring the family's gifts and reviving Casita. The Madrigals celebrate and take another family photo, this time including Mirabel and Bruno.

== Voice cast ==
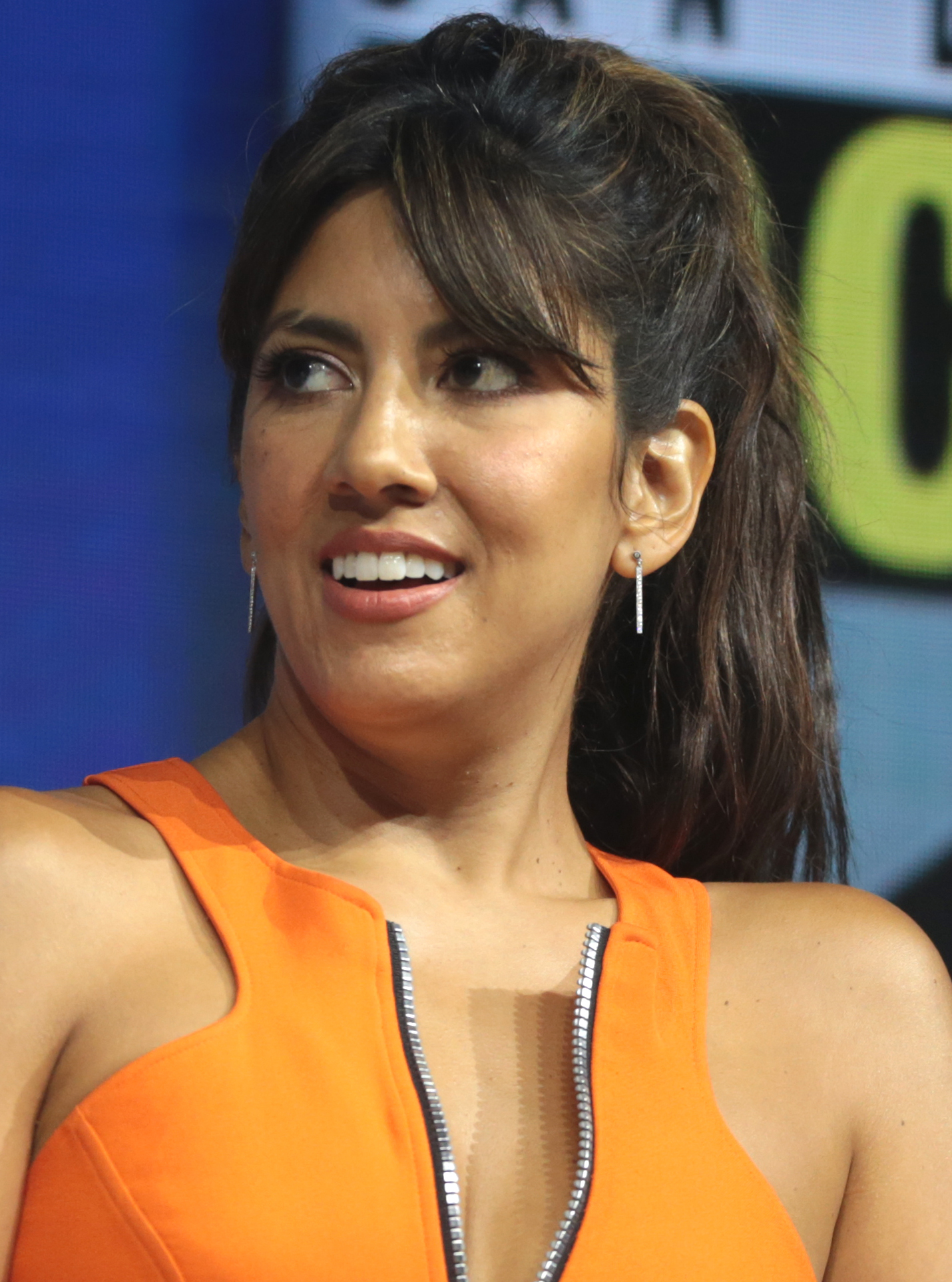
American actress and singer Stephanie Beatriz voices Mirabel Madrigal.

- Stephanie Beatriz as Mirabel Madrigal: Alma's youngest granddaughter, Bruno, Félix and Pepa's youngest niece, Luisa and Isabela's younger sister, Julieta and Agustín's youngest daughter, and Camilo, Antonio, and Dolores' cousin who, unlike her family, does not have a special gift. Director and co-writer Jared Bush described her as "imperfect and weird and quirky, but also deeply emotional and incredibly empathetic".
  - Noemi Josefina Flores voices a 5-year-old Mirabel.
- María Cecilia Botero as "Abuela" Alma Madrigal: Mirabel's 75-year-old grandmother and the family matriarch. In the film, her full name is not given and she is simply called Abuela, which is grandmother in Spanish.
  - Olga Merediz provides Abuela's singing voice. Botero reprises her role in the Spanish dub of the film, while Yaneth Waldman provides her singing voice in that version.
- John Leguizamo as Bruno Madrigal: Mirabel's 50-year-old ostracized uncle who has the ability to see and create visions of the future. Bruno also has two other personalities, Hernando and Jorge.
- Mauro Castillo as Félix Madrigal: Mirabel's uncle and Pepa's husband. Bush stated that Félix is "just there to have a good time!". Castillo reprises his role in the Spanish dub of the film.
- Jessica Darrow as Luisa Madrigal: Mirabel's older sister, who is 19, has superhuman strength and is the tallest of the family. Co-writer and co-director Charise Castro Smith described Luisa as someone who "[carries] all the burdens and never [complains]".
- Angie Cepeda as Julieta Madrigal: Mirabel's 50-year-old mother and Agustín's wife who can heal people with her cooking. Cepeda reprises her role in the Spanish and Italian dubs of the film.
- Carolina Gaitán as Pepa Madrigal: Mirabel's 50-year-old aunt and Félix's wife whose mood controls the weather. She often creates rain and storms due to her strong emotions. Gaitán reprises her role in the Spanish dub of the film.
- Diane Guerrero as Isabela Madrigal: Mirabel's oldest sister, who is 21 and can make flowers and other plants bloom anywhere. Director Byron Howard described her as "perfect" and "a success".
- Wilmer Valderrama as Agustín Madrigal: Mirabel's father and Julieta's husband whom Bush described as "accident-prone" as seen when he had different accidents revolving around him getting attacked by bees.
- Rhenzy Feliz as Camilo Madrigal: Pepa and Félix's older 15-year-old son, Dolores and Antonio's brother, and Mirabel's older cousin who can shapeshift. Castro Smith stated that Camilo is someone who "doesn't quite know who they are yet".
- Ravi Cabot-Conyers as Antonio Madrigal: Pepa and Félix's younger five-year-old son, Dolores and Camilo's brother, and Mirabel's younger cousin who gained the ability to talk to and understand the animals. He looks up to Mirabel and considers her a big sister.
- Adassa as Dolores Madrigal: Pepa and Félix's 21-year-old daughter, Camilo and Antonio's older sister, and Mirabel's oldest cousin who has superhuman hearing.
- Maluma as Mariano Guzman: Isabela's fiancé. Maluma reprises his role in the Spanish dub of the film.

Additionally, Rose Portillo voices Señora Guzman, Mariano's mother and the Madrigal family's neighbor; Alyssa Bella Candiani, Noemi Josefina Flores, Paisley Herrera, Brooklyn Skylar Rodriguez, and Ezra Rudulph voice the town kids; Juan Castano voices Osvaldo, a donkey delivery man who Bruno predicted would grow a gut, which came true; Sarah-Nicole Robles voices Señora Ozma, a townsperson who once asked Luisa to reroute the river; Hector Elias voices Old Arturo, a townsperson who asks Alma about their fellow townspeople becoming anxious about the fading magic; Alan Tudyk provides the vocal effects of Pico, a toucan whom Bush described as "clueless"; and animator Jorge E. Ruiz Cano voices the Tiple Maestro, an unseen tiple player.

== Production ==
=== Development ===
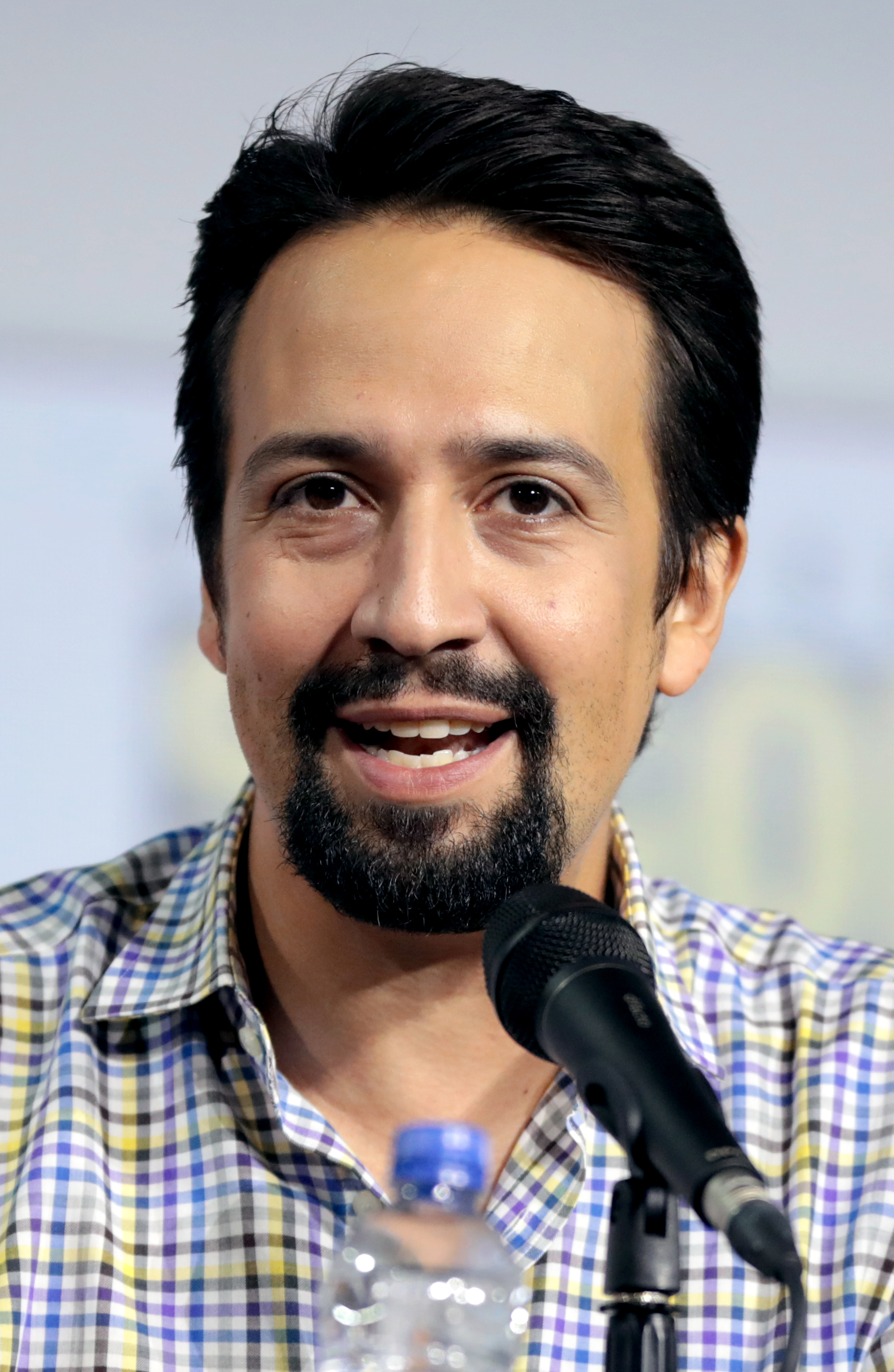
Lin-Manuel Miranda in 2019

During a November 2016 publicity tour for Moana, Miranda revealed that early-stage work had begun on an animated project that John Lasseter, then the chief creative officer of Disney Animation, had presented to him and Howard. Howard and Bush subsequently revealed that after finishing Zootopia (2016), they knew they wanted their next project to be a musical—which turned into a Latin American musical after Miranda came on board. Howard and Bush had already worked on buddy films "where two characters go out into the world and learn about each other" and wanted to try something "completely different". The three men discussed their common experience of having large extended families, and decided to make a musical film about a large extended family with a dozen main characters.

During the five years it took to develop the film, Howard and Bush's "true north" was the theme of perspective, "about how you see the other people in your family and how you're seen". They began by brainstorming ideas on a whiteboard. Early on, they made "three important discoveries" about families which became the basis of the film's story: "1) most of us don't feel truly seen by our families, 2) most of us carry burdens we never let our families see, and 3) most of us are oblivious that nearly all of us, especially within our own families, feel the exact same way". In turn, it was Miranda who suggested that the "vibrant, broad spectrum" of Latin American music could "best capture" the complexity of family relationships.

Early in development, the production team spoke with many therapists and psychologists. All were asked who would be treated best by the parents in a four-person family; every answer differed. Bush concluded: "It's about how you perceive yourself in the family." The crew also consulted family members and Disney Animation people.

Howard and Bush started to discuss Latin American culture at length with Juan Rendon and Natalie Osma, who had previously worked with them on the making-of documentary Imagining Zootopia. Rendon and Osma both happened to be from Colombia and repeatedly drew upon their personal experiences with Colombian culture in their discussions, which caused Howard, Bush, and Miranda to focus their research on that country. Rendon and Osma became the first two of several cultural experts hired by Disney Animation as consultants on the film, who collectively formed what Disney called the "Colombian Cultural Trust".

In 2018, Rendon and Osma accompanied Howard, Bush, and Miranda on a research trip to Colombia. During their two weeks in the country, they met with architects, chefs, and artisans to immerse themselves in the country's culture. They also visited the Gabriel García Márquez foundation. They visited big cities like Bogotá and Cartagena, but they found inspiration in small towns such as Salento (terrain) and Barichara (architecture). Bush noticed that "every town we went to had a very specific personality", because of how the country's mountainous terrain divides and isolates them.

According to Disney fan club publication Disney twenty-three, this isolation became the key to placing the Madrigals' residence in a "remote 'encanto'—that is, a place that's 'charmed', or spiritually blessed, a domain where magic and reality merge". As Colombian tourist guide Alejandra Espinosa Uribe explained, Colombians are surrounded by "sacred lands that feel magical, and we coexist with them, not questioning their existence".

In Barichara, they befriended Espinosa Uribe, who showed them around the town, and later hired her to consult on the film's historical and cultural authenticity. Uribe was an inspiration for several aspects of the film's protagonist Mirabel, including her curly black hair, large eyeglasses, and gestures. The design of Mirabel's skirt was inspired by traditional skirts woven in the Vélez area.

The final version of the film is deliberately vague as to the timeframe in which it is set, but drew inspiration from early-20th-century Colombia. After exploring the 1950s, the directors decided to shift the look of the film to the early 1900s and to use a "folkloric Colombian aesthetic". At the beginning of the 20th century, the country endured the Thousand Days' War, which resulted in the populations of entire villages fleeing to save themselves as depicted in the film.

=== Writing ===
As the film steadily became more complex, with an entire family to develop, multiple songs, and a rich cultural setting with a deep tradition of magical realism, Howard and Bush realized they needed a second screenwriter to help write the screenplay. They selected Charise Castro Smith for her strong background in magical realism and experience with handling "real-world family dynamics". Bush described her as a "godsend", as she provided "a foundation of heart, vulnerability and authenticity". Castro Smith sought to create a distinct, imperfect, and completely human character in Mirabel, one that spoke to the lives of many Latinas while also being relatable to viewers globally.

From working on Moana, Miranda knew that film's protagonist, Moana, originally had eight brothers before they were removed to streamline the film's plot. As Miranda had expected from that experience, Disney Animation initially resisted moving forward with a dozen main characters for Encanto. Miranda deliberately wrote the film's opening number, "The Family Madrigal", to prove to Disney Animation that it was possible to efficiently introduce such a large family and its internal dynamics to the audience. Because of the film's 90-minute runtime, the filmmakers struggled to make the center family feel genuine, fleshed out, and human, and to give them arcs.

The crew worked hard to develop Encanto upon instantly identifiable family archetypes. The team focused on pushing past the archetypes and showing that family members are more complicated than the "masks" imposed on them. Each member of the Madrigal family is inspired by a common family archetype if it were exaggerated and made magical; for example, Isabela and Luisa are based on that of the golden child and rock, respectively. Bush explained that this method prevented each gift from feeling arbitrary, instead being prescribed by emotions and personality.

Like most Disney Animation films, Encanto went through "many different versions" in its development, as various story ideas were explored and discarded. The ideas discarded along the way include:

- a young modern-day woman is transported by a magical doorknob to another world;
- Agustín was the family patriarch who discovered Encanto and personally built Casita there;
- setting the film expressly in the 1950s featuring cosmopolitan and modern fashions, as well as motor vehicles and a trip to the big city where Alma had originally come from;
- Casita was an extension of only Alma's personality, rather than the entire family;
- following the story of multiple generations and Casita over a 100-year timespan;
- Mirabel was desperately trying to find her magical gift, rather than merely expressing frustration with not being granted one;
- the colors of Mirabel's world as seen from her perspective would have reflected her emotional state as she narrated the first two acts, and then changed over to more realistic colors when the film shifted to Alma's point of view in the third act;
- Luisa's room would have been made out of stone and appeared "boring" to reflect her sense of responsibility, but would have concealed a "secret exit" to a hidden room similar to a "theme park" where she could have fun;
- Isabela at one point had a "dorky" suitor named Bubo who came from the big city.

After the film's release, Bush revealed via Twitter several more ideas which had been discussed and set aside: Alma gave birth to the triplets at the river, at the moment of Pedro's death; Isabela and Mirabel's mutual hostility culminated in a fistfight; and Mirabel celebrated her quinceañera. According to Howard, as the plot evolved over several years, "the core of the whole film" was always the relationship between Mirabel and Alma.

=== Casting ===
Disney cast several actors with Colombian heritage, including Stephanie Beatriz, whose father is Colombian; John Leguizamo, who was born in Bogotá; and Wilmer Valderrama, who spent his childhood in Colombia, where his mother is from.

Though no obvious roles which he could voice existed, due to the Madrigals' Colombian nationality and Mirabel's lack of an animal sidekick, Alan Tudyk—considered Disney's "good luck charm"—makes a cameo as Pico, a toucan. When he first came into the recording studio, Tudyk informed the crew that their scratch vocals for Pico were not actually those of toucans, but instead were parrots. He spent many hours doing imitations of various toucans. The team would speak to him in English, and Tudyk would respond using toucan noises.

=== Design ===
Encanto was the "hardest film" to date for heads of animation Renato dos Anjos and Kira Lehtomäki because they were asked to fully develop a dozen characters, as opposed to other animated films which primarily feature two or three characters out of a large cast. Accordingly, the characters required a degree of complexity that Disney Animation had previously never achieved. Journalist Edna Liliana Valencia Murillo was the Afro-Caribbean consultant and contributed greatly towards Félix, Dolores, and Antonio's designs. According to Howard, certain characters' Afro-Latin hairstyles were essential. Disney veterans Ian Gooding and Lorelay Bové were hired as production designers for the film. Lorelay and her sister, costume design lead Neysa Bové, hoped to represent the film's various communities well. Neysa requested Colombian consultants, which included an anthropologist and botanist.

Instead of fabrics similar to neoprene that are often depicted in films, the characters' costumes are generally loose. The clothes are meant to appear as though they are from Colombia. The designers emphasized embroidery, texture, and movement; each costume—except Isabela's—is asymmetric, with a handmade feeling. In Encanto, personalities and family ties are represented through color. For example, Pepa and Félix's side of the family wear warm tones of orange, yellow, and red—an homage to his Caribbean ancestry.

By contrast, Julieta and Agustín's side wear cool tones of blues, purples, and greens. Alma "sits in the middle", with darker hues, such as purple, black, and brown. Each Madrigal has a symbol on their clothing that denotes their gift, such as barbells on Luisa's skirt and Pepa's sun earrings. Due to her lack of a gift, Mirabel has symbols of the other family members' gifts embroidered across her skirt, in addition to her face and name.

The residents of the Encanto dress in neutral tones; thus, the main family are distinguished by their vivid colors. They needed to be distinctive while not standing out, which visual development artist Jin Kim said occasionally made them harder to design than the main cast. Disney used simple silhouettes for the villagers' clothes to make them seem and feel similar to typical residents from the Colombian coffee region. They incorporated depictions of the Sombrero vueltiao from the Zenú Indigenous Community and the Sombrero Aguadeño from the Aguadas Community.

=== Animation ===
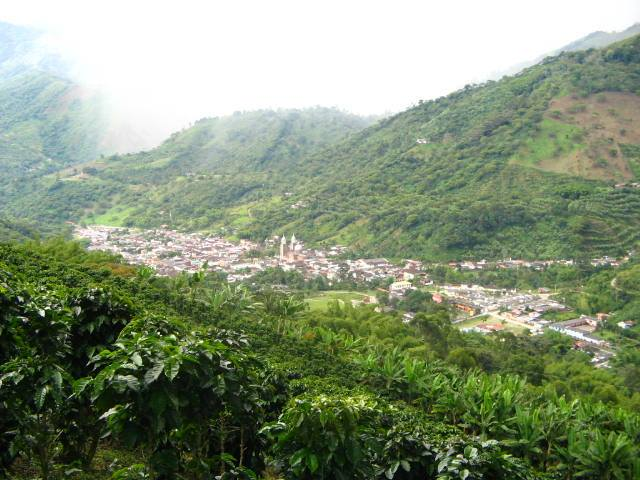
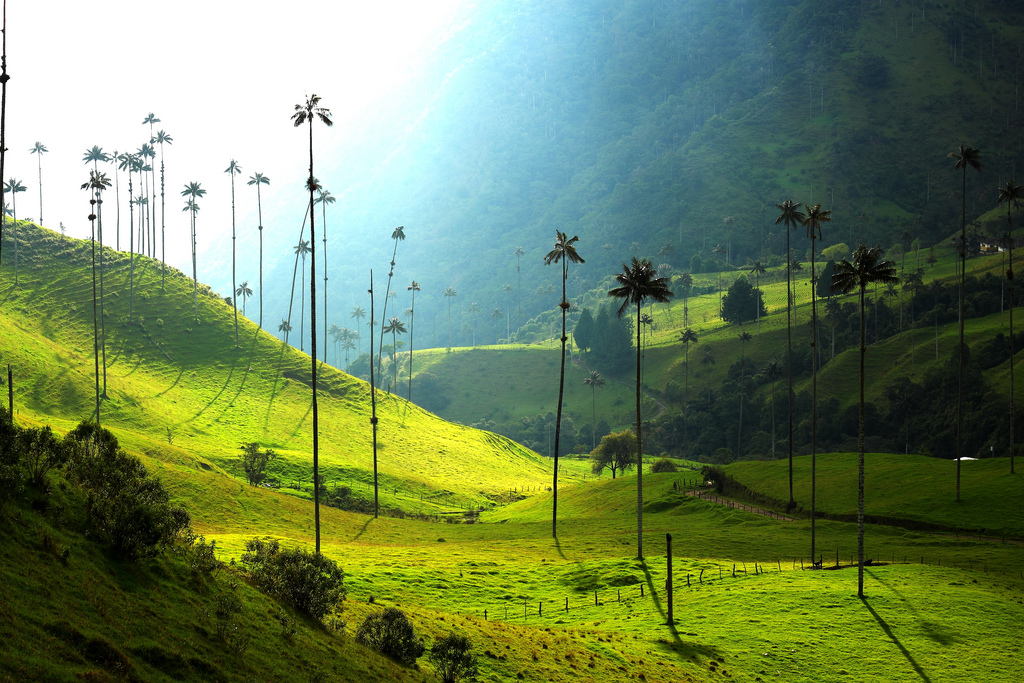
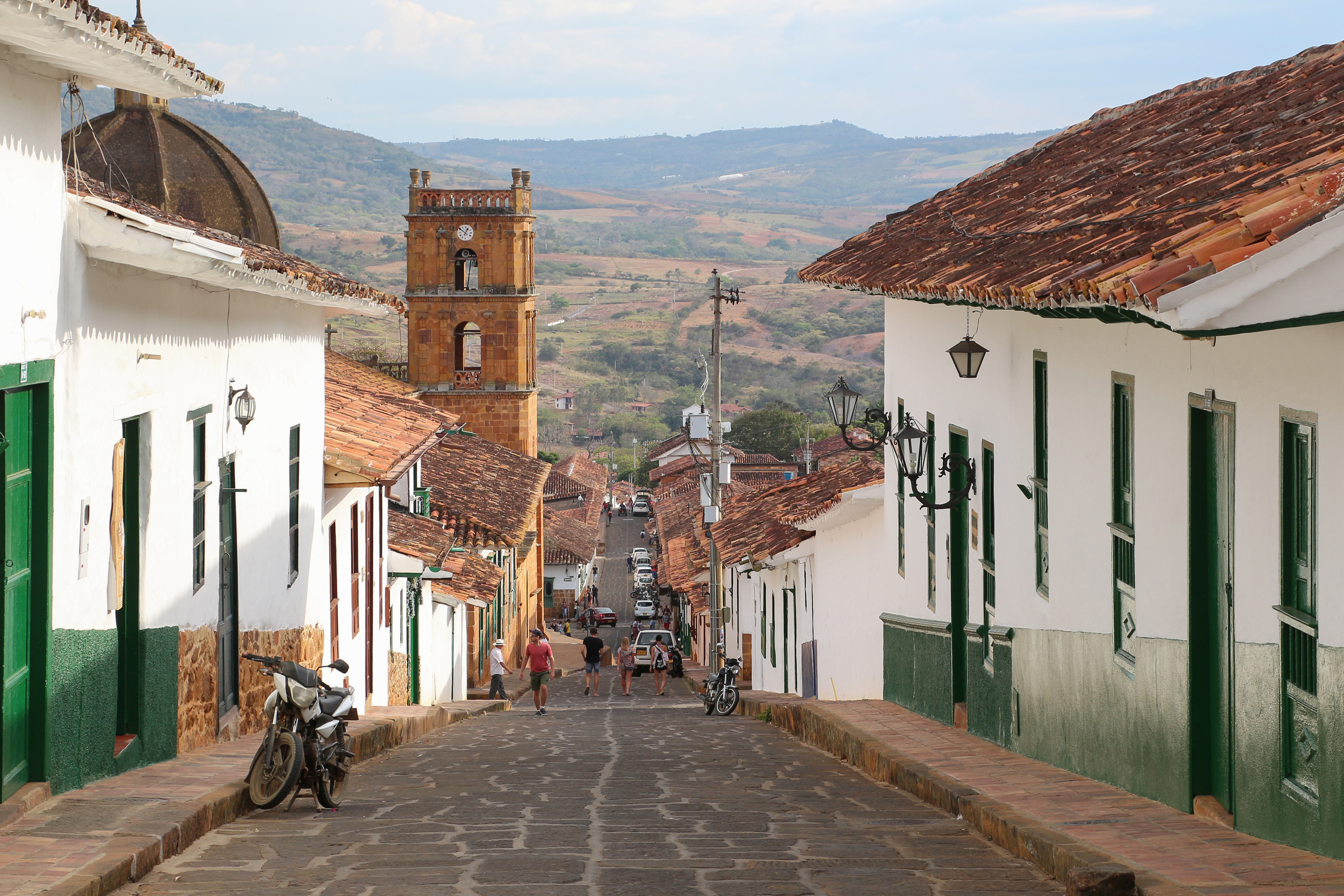
Quindío, Cocora Valley and Barichara in Santander were some of the places that the Encanto production team visited in Colombia to develop the film.

The animators were challenged by the directors to make Mirabel distinctively different from all prior Disney heroines; she had to be both capable and imperfect, but not merely just clumsy. The Casita was inspired not only by traditional Colombian homes but films in which houses come alive, especially Beetlejuice (1988).

The production team learned in their research that music, dance, and rhythm are core elements of everyday life in Colombia. As a result, Encanto was the first Disney Animation film to have choreographers involved in the development process from start to finish, meaning they worked closely with the production team to develop songs, characters, and story.

This is in contrast to older films where the story was already in place by the time a choreographer was hired to consult on specific scenes. For Encanto, Disney Animation initially hired African-American choreographer Jamal Sims, who insisted on immediately hiring Colombian-American dancer Kai Martinez as the film's animation reference consultant. They worked together with a team of dancers to prepare choreography reference footage for each scene, and then gave feedback to the animators on scenes as they were animated. They developed different dance styles for different characters; Luisa's style is reggaeton, while Mirabel's style is Cali salsa.

For selection and animation of the plants and flowers that Isabela could make grow, the production team consulted with Colombian botanist Felipe Zapata. His advice allowed appropriate plants to be selected and then shown in accurate detail. The river of jacarandas and strangler figs and the cascade of sundew that Isabela produces are all based on this input. Plants in the background scenery are also realistic. These included the iconic, but now vulnerable wax palm and dramatic Cecropia trees. Economically important plants, like coffee, also appear.

Over 800 people, 108 of them animators, were involved in the production of Encanto. Disney Animation was planning to send many of its animators to Colombia starting on March 15, 2020, in preparation for the film's transition from development to production. This second research trip had to be cancelled after the onset of the COVID-19 pandemic. The studio's animators ended up having to work remotely with the Colombian Cultural Trust; for example, Espinosa Uribe gave the animators a virtual tour of Colombia with the help of her cell phone. Diane Guerrero sent the studio's designers photographs of Colombian food taken by her relatives in Colombia.

On June 22, 2020, Miranda confirmed on Good Morning America that he and Bush were working on an animated Disney film set in Colombia, with Bush and Byron Howard directing, and Charise Castro Smith co-directing.

On June 18, 2020, the tentative title was revealed to be Encanto. The project was also confirmed to be the film Miranda was involved in, and it was reported to be about a girl in a magical family. On December 10, 2020, the project was officially confirmed at a Disney Investor Day meeting, where a clip was shown, a fall 2021 release was announced, and magical realism was referenced. According to Bush, development of the film's script wrapped in August 2021, and production on the film wrapped a month later. Due to the COVID-19 pandemic, many crew members worked together remotely for over a year and did not meet each other in person until Disney put on a socially distanced outdoor screening of the final version of the film.

=== Cinematography ===
Encanto is the first Walt Disney Animation Studios film since Winnie the Pooh (2011) to employ the taller 1.85:1 aspect ratio instead of 2.39:1, a decision made to "get closer to the characters". This layout was supplemented by romantic lighting. According to Howard, romantic (meaning heightened in spirit) is the film's key word in terms of the approach towards cinematography and lighting. The latter was also inspired by magical realism, due to the genre's heavy influence on the writing and characters.

The directors aimed to use the film's optics to portray strong emotions. Alessandro Jacomini and Daniel Rice—directors of cinematography and lighting, respectively—stated this use "would amplify, exaggerate, and distort perception, which is very in line with Mirabel's point of view as a narrator". Her feelings of being left out were also shown using emotive lighting. The directors frequently reminded the crew of the emotional subtext of every scene as well as the intricacies of the individual parts. That subtext was applied by Warner, Jacomini, and Rice in elaborate sequences, such as the song "Surface Pressure".

== Soundtrack ==
In June 2020, Miranda publicly revealed that he had begun to write the film's music, which would have eight original songs in both Spanish and English. After the film's premiere, he disclosed that he had been writing songs for the film from the very beginning. On September 8, 2021, Germaine Franco, co-composer of the songs for Coco (2017), began to score the film.

Encanto was released on November 19, 2021. A huge commercial success like the film, the soundtrack reached number one on the US Billboard 200, becoming the first Disney soundtrack since that of Frozen 2 (2019) to top the chart. The track "We Don't Talk About Bruno" broke various records and became one of Disney's most successful songs of all time. It topped the US Billboard Hot 100 and the UK Singles Chart, and marked Disney's first number-one song on the former in the 21st century and its first ever on the latter, making Encanto the first Disney film to produce a number-one song and a number-one album.

== Release ==
=== Marketing ===
The first look of the film was shown on December 10, 2020, during Disney's Investor Day. The teaser trailer was released on July 8, 2021, which garnered acclaim from internet users due to Luisa's physical appearance, especially her muscles; she was dubbed the "Buff Lady". The official trailer was released on September 29, 2021. For its opening weekend at the box office, Disney spent $14 million on television advertisements to promote the film, generating 1.26 billion impressions. Deadline Hollywood said the marketing failed to distinguish the film from other Disney properties, causing audience members to believe that it would be similar to Coco. /Film was critical of Disney's merchandising, most of which featured Mirabel and Isabela. Many members of the Madrigal family could only be bought in more costly merchandise of the entire family. Since Isabela is considered the perfect and beautiful sister, the website stated the merchandise reinforces the idea that beauty is the most effective marketing tactic for young girls.

=== Theatrical ===
Disney held the film's world premiere at the El Capitan Theatre in Hollywood, Los Angeles, on November 3, 2021, and also held a Colombia premiere at the Teatro Colón in Bogotá, Colombia on November 23, 2021. The film was theatrically released in the United States on November 24. In response to the COVID-19 pandemic, it had an exclusive 30-day theatrical run before being released on Disney+ on December 24. The film was paired with the short film Far from the Tree. Encanto was released in China on January 7, 2022. On February 16, 2022, the film was re-released in cinemas after its success on Disney+ and Academy Award nominations. As part of Disney's 100th anniversary, Encanto was re-released in Helios theaters across Poland on October 28, 2023.

=== Home media ===
Encanto was released on Disney+ on December 24, 2021, and was released by Walt Disney Studios Home Entertainment on DVD, Blu-ray, and Ultra HD Blu-ray on February 8, 2022. Bonus features include "Let's Talk About Bruno", "Our Casita", "Journey to Colombia", "Familia Lo Es Todo", "A Journey Through Music", and a sing-along version of the movie. The short film Far from the Tree was also released alongside the film on streaming and on physical media.

Analytics company Samba TV, which gathers viewership data from certain smart TVs and content providers, calculated that 2 million U.S. households watched Encanto over the holiday weekend of December 24–26, 2021. Viewership was particularly high in Sacramento (+58%), Seattle (+36%), and Los Angeles (+30%). Demographics that over-indexed compared to the U.S. overall included households with younger viewers (0–19 years), female viewers (+9%), and Hispanic viewers (+64%). Nielsen Media Research, which records streaming viewership on some U.S. television screens, calculated that Encanto was the most-watched film of 2022 with 27.4 billion minutes viewed—approximately 269 million complete showings. This figure was more than double that of the second-place film on the year-end list, Turning Red (11.43 billion minutes). Encanto subsequently ranked as the second most-streamed film of 2023 with 9.7 billion minutes viewed, behind Moana. In 2024, Encanto ranked as the fifth most-streamed film of the year, recording 6.61 billion minutes of watch time. Between January and June 2025, Encanto accumulated 2.620 billion minutes of viewing time, ranking as the nineteenth most-streamed film in that period. Nielsen subsequently reported that Encanto had accumulated 29.3 billion minutes of watch time between 2020 and 2025, ranking No. 2 among the most-streamed films during that time frame.

== Reception ==
=== Box office ===
Encanto grossed $96.1 million in the United States and Canada, and $160.4 million in other territories, for a worldwide total of $256.5 million. Encanto was 2021's highest-grossing animated film before it was surpassed by Sing 2. Factoring in both the film's production budget and marketing expenses, along with the theaters' share of revenues, Encanto was estimated to need to gross at least $300 million worldwide to break even. Nevertheless, the film went viral over the 2021 holiday season and achieved wider commercial success after its digital release to Disney+ on December 24, 2021.

In the United States and Canada, it was released alongside House of Gucci and Resident Evil: Welcome to Raccoon City, and originally projected to gross $35–40 million from 3,980 theaters in its five-day opening weekend. It opened nationwide on Wednesday, November 24, 2021 (the day before American Thanksgiving), and made $7.5 million on its first day, including $1.5 million from Tuesday night previews. It went on to make $40.6 million in its first five days. Of the 3.7 million moviegoers who saw it, 52% were Latino and Hispanic, 51% were families, and 62% were female. Though its five-day opening gross was lower than Pixar's The Good Dinosaur (2015) ($55.4 million), which failed at the box office in 2015, Encanto had the best opening weekend for an animated film during the COVID-19 pandemic.

In its second weekend, it made $13.1 million, less than the second-weekend results of The Good Dinosaur ($15.3 million) and Tangled (2010) ($21.6 million) but higher than The Princess and the Frog (2009) ($12.1 million). It went on to finish in second place in its third and fourth weekends, earning $10 million and $6.5 million, respectively. In its fifth weekend, it made $1.8 million and dropped to ninth place at the box office. In its sixth weekend, it finished in tenth place with $1.08 million. It dropped out of the box office top ten in its seventh weekend, finishing eleventh with $613,501.

Outside of the U.S. and Canada, it made $29.3 million from 47 markets in its opening weekend. The top countries in its first five days were France ($3.5 million), Colombia ($2.6 million), the UK ($2.4 million), Korea ($2.2 million), and Italy ($2.1 million). It earned $20.7 million in its second weekend and $13.6 million in its third. In its fourth weekend, it became Colombia's second-highest-grossing animated film of all time. In its fifth weekend, it crossed the $100 million mark outside the U.S. and Canada. It earned $3.5 million in its sixth weekend, $5.8 million in its seventh, and $3.6 million in its eighth. As of January 9, 2022, its largest markets are France ($18.5 million), Colombia ($10.2 million), the UK ($8.8 million), Spain ($7.3 million), and Japan ($6.6 million).

=== Critical response ===
[T]he general consensus on Encanto is that, if you tend to enjoy most modern Disney movies, you'll probably enjoy Encanto, as it has a lot in common with them. However, you might just find something truly special within that tried and true formula.

— Dirk Libbey, CinemaBlend writer

Encanto received critical acclaim. (Note: Attributed to multiple references:) News channel CNBC reported reviewers considered it among Walt Disney Animation's best films. On the review aggregator website Rotten Tomatoes, 92% of 210 critics' reviews are positive, with an average rating of 7.5/10. The website's consensus reads, "Encanto's setting and cultural perspective are new for Disney, but the end result is the same – enchanting, beautifully animated fun for the whole family." Metacritic, which uses a weighted average, assigned the film a score of 75 out of 100 based on 41 critics, indicating "generally favorable" reviews. Audiences polled by CinemaScore gave the film an average grade of "A" on an A+ to F scale, while those at PostTrak gave it an 88% positive score, with 70% saying they would definitely recommend it.

The film's animation, which journalists considered beautiful, was a source of plaudits. RogerEbert.com critic Monica Castillo thought the musical sequences and characters' rooms allowed animation more artistic and abstract than that of previous Disney films. Writing for Good Morning America, Peter Travers deemed the visuals of Encanto miraculous, while Shreemayee Das of Firstpost described the animation as having spellbinding intricacy. Variety's Owen Gleiberman gave acclaim, saying "Encanto has been visualized with a vivacious naturalistic glow (swirling flower petals, eye-candy pastels) that, at moments, is nearly psychedelic". David Rooney from The Hollywood Reporter highlighted the film's colors and the designs of the costumes, natural settings, and Casita for particular praise. For IndieWire, Kristen Lopez lauded the visuals as stunning and life-like. IGN's Andrea Towers called the animation beautiful. The Daily Telegraph film critic Robbie Collin was particularly amazed: "Encanto's animation is dazzling in all sorts of ways, with technical effects and flights of creative fancy that would have been unimaginable even a year ago, particularly during the musical numbers."

Critics found the film's songs "spellbinding". According to Ben Travis of Empire, the songs once again demonstrate Miranda's abundant skills for enchanting, wondrous melodies and lyrics. For Chicago Sun-Times and the Daily Herald, respectively, Richard Roeper and Dann Gire described the music as "infectious and instantly memorable", and "emotionally distilled [and] verbally nimble"; The Detroit News writer Adam Graham agreed, commenting that the songs "lift [Encanto] to the sky". Similarly, The Arizona Republic's Bill Goodykoontz regarded them as the film's peak. CNN writer Brian Lowry shared a similar view. Nevertheless, many journalists found fault with the music, such as National Review's Kyle Smith, who called it "thuddingly mediocre". Though he found the songs "breezy and fun", Christian Holub of Entertainment Weekly deemed them unmemorable. Writing for Bleeding Cool, Kaitlyn Booth believed the music was "[no]thing particularly special" and that a lack of songs would have benefited the film.

[Encanto] is about a lot more than just representation. The happiness portrayed in Encanto isn't just escapism, it's defiance. It's about challenging that notion that we Colombians have to be miserable forever. ... It's about the miracle of thriving when you seem almost cosmically predisposed to suffer ad infinitum. Because that's what Colombia is: a country of people trying their best to thrive in spite of themselves.

— José María Luna, Polygon writer

Reviewers singled out Encanto's representation and diversity for particular praise. Writing for The Guardian, Simran Hans found the awareness of culturally unique generational trauma and displacement intriguing and surprising. Despite being critical of a perceived disguise of cultural representation, Rafael Matomayor of The New York Observer stated that "when the film dives into the specificity of its portrayal of Colombia[,] ... it becomes an exciting, nuanced, complex magical realist adventure" that propels Disney into "a new era". The Independent's Clarissa Loughgrey highlighted that the cultural specificity was more than simple aesthetic or linguistic references, commending the incorporation of magical realism and various skin tones. Whelan Barzel of Time Out summarized the film as a "genuine love letter to the diversity of Latin America".

Reviews with regards to the film's portrayal of family dynamics deemed the aspect one of its strengths. According to Slant Magazine's Derek Smith, Encanto thrives in expressing not only the typical message of the value of family but also the concept that even the best families require much effort to stay intact. Preston Barra of Denton Record-Chronicle named the message of family a contributing factor to the film becoming a "must-see family event"; fellow journalist Matt Goldberg, who writes for Collider, commended the message of "[being] enough because family is enough". Polygon's Petrana Radulovic found the familial interactions stunningly realistic and strengthened by magical metaphors. Many critics also acclaimed Encanto's emotional depth. The A.V. Club's Caroline Siede lauded the depiction of intergenerational trauma. According to Screen International critic Tim Greierson, when the directors concentrate on the script's underlying emotions, the film is extremely moving. Writing for CinemaBlend, Dirk Libbey opined that every audience member would eventually cry once they discovered which character they identified with most. MovieWeb singled out Mirabel's search for acceptance and a purpose, stating "[b]uckets of tears are going to be shed".

Regarding "Disney's regular formula", Encanto divided reviewers; some thought that it departed from the formula well. Forbes's Scott Mendelson called the film "terrifically unconventional", while World critic Collin Garbarino highlighted several aspects that he recognized as deviating from the formula; such as a lack of princesses and villains, as well as the focus on community. Vulture's Bilge Ebiri attributed the film's enchanting qualities to the "smaller-scale narrative". He explained that when the Madrigals' inner journey is combined with the typical "Disney spectacle", it becomes an unexpected, "downright Sirkian power". Others found it too similar to other Disney films. For Pittsburgh Magazine, Sean Collier felt the film was "just another by-the-numbers Disney flick", while Peter Bradshaw from The Guardian thought that the story "wants to have its metaphorical cake and eat it", deeming it contrived. /Film's Josh Spiegel thought Encanto included a mixture of formulaic aspects from many of the previous Disney and Pixar films, and failed to make them unnoticeable.

Some critics found the story unfocused. The Irish Independent's Paul Whittington considered the plot "too aimless, to satisfy anyone for long". Alice Forman of Mashable concurred and felt several parts of Mirabel's journey were arbitrary; she had a particularly negative opinion of the film's middle section, which she called tedious. The Globe and Mail writer Aparita Bhandari asserted the internal, rather than external, source of conflict and several unanswered questions confused her, preventing her from immersing herself in the film. From USA Today, Brian Truitt expressed his disappointment in the third act, which he said misses Encanto's focal point. David Lynch, writing for KENS, agreed, and stated the act was weak due to an underdeveloped relationship between Mirabel and Alma, as well as clumsy writing. Multiple critics also cited the film's lack of villains as a detractor.

Metacritic reported that Encanto appeared in five critic top-ten lists, including CNN and New York Daily News's non-ranked lists, and Pittsburgh Post-Gazette's ranking (ninth). The film has also appeared on several lists of the best animated films of 2021, including those by Paste (tenth), Rotten Tomatoes (sixth), Screen Rant (non-ranked), MovieWeb (fifth), Vulture (non-ranked), and Comic Book Resources (sixth). Variety, IndieWire, Gold Derby, Entertainment Weekly, The Hollywood Reporter, Den of Geek, and the Los Angeles Times named the film the most likely to win the Academy Award for Best Animated Feature, (Note: Attributed to multiple references:) which was ultimately the case.

=== Impact and response ===
The Denver Post journalist John Wenzel wrote, with Encanto alongside other 2021 films like West Side Story and Being the Ricardos, "Latino voices are having a moment in U.S. cinema, injecting a diverse set of cultures long ignored by TV, books, movies, video games, stage shows and news media." Pamila Avila, writing for USA Today, underscored that Encanto is Disney's first feature with an all-Latin American cast, capturing "the complicated tug and pull between older and younger generations in Hispanic families." Roughly 25% of viewership comes from Hispanic households, while 40% of viewers are between the ages of 2 and 11.

Billboard writer Leila Cobo said, following the success of Colombian musicians like Shakira, Maluma and J Balvin in the U.S., Colombia is "finally seen and not just heard" via Encanto. Cobo praised the film for not homogenizing all of the Latin American countries in the manner U.S. media has generally been, instead accurately depicting the culture unique to Colombia: "from accents to outfits to minute details like the hand-painted tableware, the embroidered dresses, the food, the many colors of our skin, even the animals – including the ubiquitous toucan and the yellow butterflies that are synonymous with García Márquez."

Johanna Ferreira of PopSugar wrote that the success of both Encanto and its soundtrack speaks to "not just the importance and significance of this type of representation in animated films, but also how movies like this are really changing how Latino stories are being told." She stated Encanto celebrates the importance of family and respect for Latin American culture, featuring "animated stories about Latinos written by Latinos, with characters voiced by Latinos, and a storyline that actually celebrates Latino communities rather than stereotype [Latino]."

Mikael Wood of Los Angeles Times stated Encanto became "2022's first widespread cultural phenomenon", bolstered by its unique direction and music. Far Out journalist Tyler Posen called the effect "Encanto-mania". Various social media trends surrounding Encanto had "people posting videos of their children recognizing themselves for perhaps the first time in the movie's characters." Luisa's physical appearance has been praised for representing muscular women—a departure from Disney's conventionally "feminine" depiction of female protagonists as "small and skinny". As of January 23, 2022, the videos tagged with the hashtag "#encanto" have collectively amassed more than 11.5 billion views on TikTok.

The film's characters and their dynamics have fueled a discourse among mental health specialists, many of whom reported that their clients, especially first-generation children of immigrants, "see themselves reflected" in the story of Encanto and use the film to communicate "about things that otherwise might go unsaid." Mirabel, Isabela, Luisa, Alma and Bruno have been the most discussed characters, with Bruno being associated with neurodivergent family members. Speaking to CNN, psychotherapist Kadesha Adelakun stated "there are so many layers" to Encanto, portraying issues "many families are going through."

=== Accolades ===
At the 94th Academy Awards, Encanto received nominations for Best Original Score and Best Original Song, and won Best Animated Feature. The film won three awards at the 65th Annual Grammy Awards in the visual media categories: Best Score Soundtrack, Best Compilation Soundtrack, and Best Song ("We Don't Talk About Bruno"). Encanto's other nominations include nine Annie Awards (winning three), a British Academy Film Award (which it won), two Critics' Choice Movie Awards, and three Golden Globe Awards (winning one). It also won the National Board of Review Award for Best Animated Film.

== Other media ==
=== Encanto at the Hollywood Bowl ===
Encanto at the Hollywood Bowl is a 2022 live musical hosted by Lin-Manuel Miranda, which includes some of the film's cast members performing the songs from the film. The stage musical was performed on November 11 and 12 at the Hollywood Bowl, and a concert film version was released on December 28, 2022 on Disney+.

=== Nightmares and Sueños ===
The young adult novel Nightmares and Sueños, written by Alex Segura, is a prequel to the film that focuses on seventeen-year-old Bruno and shows why people do not talk about him. It released on December 3, 2024.

=== Video games ===
Mirabel was added to Disney Dreamlight Valley in a February 2023 update as one of the villagers of the titular valley, along with a small version of Casita called "Mini Casita" as her home. In the world building game Disney Magic Kingdoms, during a limited time event with a storyline set after the events of the film, Mirabel, Bruno, Isabela, Luisa and Antonio were added as playable characters, along with Casita and Isabela's Room as attractions. Mirabel, Bruno, Isabela and Luisa appear as playable characters in the mobile game Disney Heroes: Battle Mode.

=== Theme park attractions ===
On March 21, 2024, Disney announced that a new Encanto stage show, ¡Celebración Encanto! would temporarily run from June 10 through September 6, 2024. However, it was later announced that it would become a full-time entertainment offering, and is currently permanent. The show is held multiple times daily at the CommuniCore Plaza in the World Celebration area at Epcot, and features live appearances from Mirabel and Bruno.

==== Upcoming theme park ride ====
In August 2024, it was announced that an Encanto ride is in development for Disney's Animal Kingdom, scheduled to open in 2027 as part of a new Tropical Americas section of the park, which will replace DinoLand U.S.A.. The ride will take guests on a tour of the Casita on the day of Antonio's gift ceremony, celebrating his connection with animals. In December 2025, it was announced that the original voice actors will return for the ride.

=== Other films ===
The characters of Encanto make cameo appearances in the 2023 short film Once Upon a Studio, where they meet with other Walt Disney Animation Studios characters to take a group photo.

The 2026 film Descendants: Wicked Wonderland of the Descendants franchise includes the character Luis Madrigal (portrayed by Alexandro Byrd), who is the son of Luisa Madrigal, and has the same strength as his mother.

== Future ==
Jared Bush and Charise Castro Smith said they are open to a potential Disney+ series. Bush stated he would be happy to see a show about any member of the family, and Castro Smith shared that Miranda was very interested in creating a show about Dolores. Then–Disney CEO Bob Chapek described Encanto as the company's latest franchise during a February 2022 earnings call. However, Miranda revealed in December 2024, three years after the film's release: "We haven't talked about any Encanto sequels".

In March 2025, John Leguizamo reported that the possibility of a sequel is in the works, once the team in charge comes up with a storyline.
