= Coldeportes =

Administrative Department of Sport, Recreation, Physical Activity and the Use of Free Time
- Departamento Administrativo del Deporte la Recreación, la Actividad Física y el Aprovechamiento del Tiempo Libre

Agency overview
- Formed: 3 November 2011
- Colombian Institute of Sport
- Headquarters: Avenida 68 № 55-65; Bogotá, D.C., Colombia
- Annual budget: COP$145,817,414,686 (2011); COP$248,123,313,894 (2012); COP$334,888,914,916 (2013)
- Agency executive: Andres Botero Phillipsbourne, Director
- Website: www.coldeportes.gov.co

The Administrative Department of Sport, Recreation, Physical Activity and the Use of Free Time, Coldeportes was the national government department of sports in and for Colombia; it is charged with fomenting, planning and organizing the activities of sport and physical education.
