= History of journalism in Colombia =

Journalism in Colombia was born in the 18th century—when the territory was still part of the Viceroyalty of New Granada—with publications such as the Gazeta de Santa Fe (1785), promoted by Manuel del Socorro Rodríguez, from Cuba, and considered the father of national journalism. Since then, the press has played a central role in the formation of public opinion and in the country's political processes, especially during the Independence, when newspapers such as La Bagatela by Antonio Nariño became instruments for disseminating republican ideas.

Throughout the 19th century, Colombian journalism consolidated itself as a partisan tribune for liberals and conservatives, reflecting political polarization while simultaneously promoting literacy and public debate. The arrival of the 20th century brought with it radio, cinema and television, which transformed the informative practice and brought communication closer to popular sectors, marking the beginning of a modern media culture.

During the second half of the 20th century, Colombian journalism experienced processes of professionalization and modernization, influenced by the National Front, the expansion of television and the subsequent liberalization of the media sector. Despite censorship, violence and the murders of numerous journalists, the press maintained its role as an instrument of memory and resistance. In the 21st century, digitalization has reconfigured traditional media and has opened new spaces for citizen participation, although it has also brought challenges such as misinformation and economic concentration. The history of journalism in Colombia is, in sum, a reflection of the country's political, cultural and technological evolution, from its colonial origins to the current digital era.

== History ==
=== Birth in the viceregal period ===
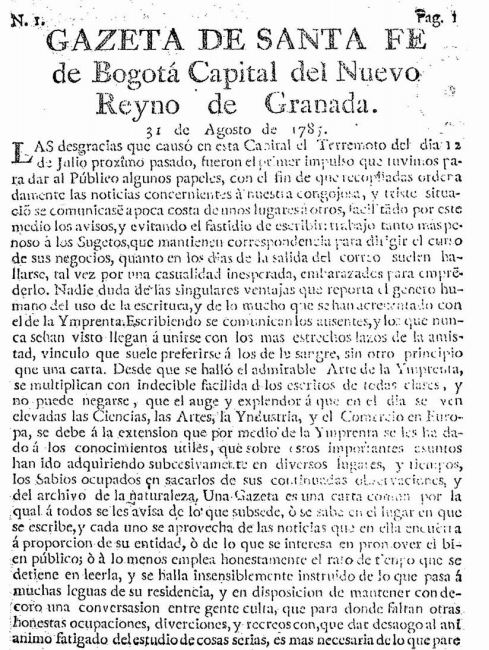
Front page of the Gazeta de Santa Fe de Bogotá, printed in 1785 at the Royal Printing Press of Antonio Espinosa de los Monteros in the Viceroyalty of New Granada.

Journalism in Colombia was born in the final context of the viceregal period, when Enlightenment ideas began to permeate Spanish overseas territories. The first journalistic manifestations appeared in 1785 with the Aviso del Terremoto sucedido en la ciudad de Santafé el día 12 de julio de 1785, a publication that narrated in chronicle format the events that occurred during an earthquake that shook the capital of the Viceroyalty of New Granada. This document detailed the identity of some of the dead and the damage caused in the city, thus establishing a fundamental precedent for the development of national journalism.

That same year appeared the Gazeta de la ciudad de Santafé de Bogotá, both publications considered the beginning and preamble of Colombian journalism. These first editorial experiences were modest and lacked information about their editors or exact publication dates, but they represented the first organized attempt to inform the population about relevant events. The late arrival of the printing press to the colonies was due in large part to the censorship exercised by the Tribunal of the Holy Office of the Inquisition, which deeply distrusted the power of the written word.

The printing press had operated in the Viceroyalty for more than half a century before the birth of the first proper newspaper, but its production was limited to religious materials: novenas, sermons, prayers, ecclesiastical news and pious compositions. The Spanish government and ecclesiastical authorities were aware of the subversive potential of the printed word, so they established strict controls over what could be published. This censorship, however, did not manage to prevent ideas of freedom and independence from circulating among enlightened creoles.

The true watershed of Colombian journalism came on February 9, 1791 with the founding of the Papel Periódico de la Ciudad de Santafé de Bogotá, directed by Manuel del Socorro Rodríguez. This publication already met the criteria to be considered a modern news medium: it had a director-journalist, was published weekly and maintained remarkable continuity for the time. The newspaper had a total of 265 issues and circulated until January 6, 1797, totaling six years of uninterrupted existence.

The first 259 issues were edited at the Royal Printing Press of Don Antonio Espinosa de los Monteros; each issue consisted of eight pages and circulated on Fridays. The newspaper operated under a subscription scheme, with approximately 146 subscribers who probably had informational advantage in the gatherings of the time. Among its regular readers and collaborators were distinguished creoles such as José Celestino Mutis, director of the Botanical Expedition; his disciple Pedro Fermín de Vargas; Francisco Antonio Zea, future vice president of Gran Colombia; and Antonio Nariño, independence politician and military man who also supported with his printing press the publication of several issues until his exile.

=== Manuel del Socorro Rodríguez: The father of Colombian journalism ===
Manuel del Socorro Rodríguez was as interesting a figure as he was multifaceted, considered the father of Colombian journalism. Born in Cuba, throughout his life he practiced various trades: carpenter, cabinetmaker, draftsman and painter, in addition to developing a deep taste for calligraphy and the humanities. His training was completely self-taught, the product of a fierce discipline that led him to dedicate five hours a day of his rest to reading and writing during his childhood and adolescence.

Thanks to his love for the humanities and his ability for stimulating conversation, Rodríguez developed a close relationship with the newly appointed viceroy José de Ezpeleta, who invited him to Bogotá to occupy the position of official librarian of the capital, a position he held until his death. This position allowed him to be in permanent contact with the knowledge and ideas circulating at the time, thus enriching his journalistic work and his vision about the role of the press in colonial society.

The Papel Periódico de la Ciudad de Santafé de Bogotá addressed diverse themes that included the daily and social life of the colonies, the recovery of certain colonial literary values, military and civil activity, among other topics of public interest. Despite the high censorship that existed on the part of Spain, which required that all writing be approved by the authorities delegated by the king before being sent to print, Rodríguez managed to make subtle criticisms against colonialism and the cultural exile of indigenous peoples through his publications.

Rodríguez also offered a broader and more complex vision of colonial reality, talking about how internal wars between indigenous communities had weakened the strength of these peoples, facilitating the European invasion. This multidimensional perspective distinguished him as a thinker ahead of his time, capable of critically analyzing both Spanish colonialism and the internal dynamics of pre-Columbian societies. His balanced approach laid the foundations for a more analytical and reflective journalism.

The continuity of the Papel Periódico never depended on changes in direction, and when this newspaper closed in 1797, Rodríguez founded another weekly called El Redactor Americano in 1806, to which in 1807 he added a supplement called El Alternativo al Redactor Americano. This persistence demonstrates his unwavering commitment to journalism and the circulation of ideas, consolidating his legacy as a fundamental pioneer in the history of communication in Colombia. His work established standards of quality and continuity that would influence subsequent generations of Colombian journalists.

=== Journalism during Independence and the formation of the Republic ===
During the period of Independence, Colombian journalism acquired a militant character and was put at the service of the patriot armies. The press was used to talk about the needs of the troops, celebrate their triumphs, recount the defeats of the enemy and keep the population informed about the continuous independence mobilization. Printed materials became fundamental propaganda tools for the liberating cause, transforming the role of the journalist into a front-line political actor.

The Spanish attempt to prevent both the arrival and publication of secular texts proved futile. Many people who would later become heroes of Independence were exiled to Europe, from where they returned with much more consolidated ideas and a broader vision of the world. Literary gatherings and salons multiplied throughout the colonies, spaces where the influence of European Enlightenment ideas was evident and where many of the publications that would accompany the independence process were conceived.

From 1810 onwards, innumerable daily and biweekly or weekly newspapers were founded. Among them stood out La Bagatela, founded by Antonio Nariño, from which it was possible for him to overthrow the first Government Junta and seize power. This newspaper, considered by some authors as the first political newspaper in the country, demonstrated the immense power that the press could exercise over political events. Nariño fought through his writings so that the weak and inexperienced provinces would abandon the idea of becoming independent republics.

On the other hand, the federalist newspaper Argos Americano of Cartagena was in charge of confronting Nariño's attacks against the Junta, evidencing the deep political divisions that would characterize the country throughout the 19th century. The conception of journalism at the time established that only those at the head of power could speak freely, which led Nariño and other journalists to be forced to live in exile for their journalistic work. This persecution demonstrated both the power and the risks inherent in the exercise of political journalism.

When the independence struggles ended, important figures sought in the press a means of literary and intellectual expression to make known their works and organize the new State. Each figure published in the newspaper closest to his political line, which surprisingly allowed press freedom to be respected, perhaps more by accident than by authentic will for concord. This proliferation of publications laid the foundations for a plural, although deeply partisan, press system.

=== Journalism in Colombia during the 19th century ===
During the 19th century, Colombian journalism was characterized by its eminently political nature, which prevented the development of a journalistic industry comparable to that of other countries in America, the United States or Europe. While in those regions large companies generated newspapers of wide circulation and abundant pagination, in Colombia newspapers were invariably four sheets that appeared to defend political ideas and disappeared at the whim of civil wars or occasional dictatorships. This instability was reflected in the fact that the longest-running Colombian newspaper in the 19th century did not manage to maintain itself for thirteen continuous years, contrasting dramatically with the situation of other Latin American countries where at the end of the century, Argentina exhibited two newspapers of old circulation and universal renown, Chile had El Mercurio, Peru had El Comercio and Uruguay had El Día.

The first decades of Colombian republican and independent life, between 1810 and 1820, were characterized by the issuance of newspapers linked to the revolutionary cause or to the maintenance of colonial power. Between 1808 and 1815, in what had been the viceroyalty of New Granada, there was a deployment of formulas for organizing an incipient republican system that appealed to the principle of popular sovereignty and that erected some freedoms, whose main beneficiaries were literate creoles. Newspapers constituted a device elaborated by individuals trained for the tasks of dissemination and persuasion, in a public space of opinion that was beginning to expand and become conflictive. Publications such as Diario Político de Santafé de Bogotá and La Bagatela played a crucial role in the dissemination of political debates and the transmission of the Declaration of the Rights of Man and of the Citizen by Antonio Nariño.

Between 1820 and 1830, during the era of Gran Colombia, newspapers of all kinds proliferated: religious, federalist, centralist, santanderista, Bolivarian and Masonic. Particularly noteworthy were those dedicated to political satire, such as Los Toros de Fucha created in 1821 by Antonio Nariño. Prominent political figures such as Simón Bolívar and Francisco de Paula Santander had active participation in the founding and direction of newspapers during this period. The rapid expansion of the press was an indication that the Enlightenment of the late colonial era was reaching a wider section of the literate population, reflecting material progress and the active interest of governments. The journalism of this era was not a place of rest but of combat, where journalists had to adapt to the violent political game typical of caudillismo.

During this period, the Gazeta de Colombia (later titled Gaceta de Colombia) emerged as a prominent publication, whose first issue was published on September 6, 1821, in Villa del Rosario de Cúcuta. It consolidated itself as the official broadcasting organ of the government of the Republic of Colombia, functioning initially as a platform to legitimize the executive power led by Santander to promote fiscal and educational reforms. Under the successive direction of figures such as Miguel Santa María, Vicente Azuero, and Casimiro Calvo, the publication structured its format into an official section for decrees and an unofficial one for opinion and international news. With the independence crises and the assumption of dictatorial powers by Bolívar starting in 1827, the newspaper underwent a forced editorial shift, becoming the main organ of legitimization for the new regime until its final closure on December 29, 1831, coinciding with the end of Gran Colombia.

Once Venezuela and Ecuador separated from Colombia in the 1830s, civil and regional wars returned with force. The decade between 1830 and 1840 was characterized by an incipient development of the press in the country, particularly affected by the War of the Supremes in 1839 and 1840, a situation that destroyed much of the journalistic projects. With the civil wars appeared the press dedicated to defending the interests of the different factions in conflict, such as El Granadino of 1831 and El Cachaco of Bogotá of 1833. The balcony at the newspaper's house was a tribune on demonstration days; when in Bogotá the crowd grew restless, people went to newspapers such as El Tiempo, El Diario Nacional or El Espectador. Prominent figures such as Rafael Núñez reached the presidency from newspapers such as El Porvenir of Cartagena.

The relationship between journalism, civilization and politics formed a conflictive triad that profoundly marked the country's development. The Liberal and Conservative parties, newly created in the mid-century, agreed that the most important goal was the promotion and defense of European civilization as a model. Leaders proclaimed that the Independence of 1810 did not mark the beginning of a new civilization, but that the European model should be adopted, while indigenous practices were considered vices to be eradicated. This Europeanizing vision permeated journalistic discourse throughout the century and configured the forms of representation of "others" in Colombian media. Parties, movements, caudillos and local, regional and national bosses found in the press the perfect instrument to disseminate their ideological platforms.

A fundamental milestone in the modernization of the Colombian press was the printing press established by the liberal journalist and politician Manuel Ancízar in the mid-century, with the support of President Tomás Cipriano de Mosquera. Political and ideological agitations demonstrated to the New Granada elite that the newspaper was the appropriate tool to unify interests and the starting point to build political and cultural hegemonies; that the printing press imposed a work method that fostered communion among intellectuals; that the reproductive work of the printer could create awareness of a common past and future for a society; and that it was a fundamental means to disseminate ideologies and familiarize citizens with projects of social organization. From this printing press emerged El Neogranadino, one of the most influential newspapers of liberalism, which defended liberal reforms from the arrival of José Hilario López to power in 1849 until its disappearance in 1857, succumbing to the conservative governments that took power from 1855 onwards.

The two liberal periods of the 19th century were fundamental for journalistic development: the first between 1848 and 1854, when various modernizing reforms were undertaken, and the second between 1863 and 1885, during the federal regime. Both periods were characterized by allowing freedom of the press and the free right of opinion, first through law 2100 of 1851 on absolute freedom of the press, and then with the radicalization of this right in the Constitution of 1863, of federal character. These legal-constitutional processes provided the conditions for the emergence of newspapers of all kinds, constituting the period of greatest journalistic dissemination of the 19th century. During these liberal periods the greatest number of periodical publications was registered, aligned with the policy of establishing absolute freedom of press and opinion, and the press was the great vehicle for disseminating partisan ideologies where debates about the type of state regime, the participation of the Catholic Church in state matters and electoral processes spread rapidly throughout the country.

The Catholic Church played a preponderant role in the configuration of nineteenth-century public opinion through its own press, especially in support of the Conservative Party and in the stigmatization of the Liberal Party during much of the century. Despite its traditionalism, the Church incorporated itself into modern practices by using the printing press in its participation in political debate, exercising social control, promoting Romanization and undertaking a discursive struggle. The Church used the press during the 19th century in function of its process of adaptation to the modern logics that were imposed for the time, in opposition to the old perspectives of the Ancien Régime. El Catolicismo, the official newspaper of the archdiocese, holds the title of being the longest-running in all of Colombian history. The religious press constituted a determining sector in various debates that traced the north of public opinion during the 19th century.

=== The partisan struggle and sectarian journalism ===
At the beginning of the 19th century, once the newspaper was established as the major source of expression and training for future journalists—since there were still no schools for it—hundreds of publications began to emerge that closed ranks around an ideology or political figure. In the years immediately following the culmination of Independence, each printed matter declared its inclinations, whether of a pro-Bolivarian or pro-Santanderist nature. This practice continued throughout the century, especially during the era of bipartisan violence, when newspapers openly declared whether they were liberal or conservative.

Whoever adhered to one side was, of course, an enemy of the other, so that the mere informative intention was not on the agenda of Colombian media. Political commitment was a proper stance of the 19th century and early 20th century that prevented the development of a more objective and pluralist journalism. With journalistic practice attached to the whim of partisan, dogmatic, violent and hegemonic struggle, newspapers served exclusively the interests of two organized political factions, but without a clear, coherent and inclusive nation project.

This situation configured scenarios and practices of censorship and self-censorship, reducing the press to fulfilling the role of courier of political ideas with which particular hegemonic projects were consolidated. The partisan struggle accustomed the country to published political information being covered with a sectarian, dogmatic ideological mantle little appropriate for the generation of a political culture sustained on principles of plurality and respect for difference. This sectarian journalism prevented the formation of a national public opinion capable of broadly understanding political facts.

Once the Conservative and Liberal parties were consolidated in the mid-19th century, numerous partisan newspapers appeared. Some examples include El Siglo, founded by Salvador Camacho Roldán in 1849, who also created La Reforma (1851), La Opinión (1863–66), La Paz and El Agricultor (1868–69) and La Unión (1861). Rafael Núñez founded La Democracia in Cartagena and wrote in newspapers such as El Neogranadino, El Tiempo and La Opinión. Each of these media represented specific political interests and contributed to deepening the country's ideological divisions.

However, there were some exceptions to the fanatical sectarianism of the press. In 1836, Juan Francisco Ortiz founded La Estrella Nacional, the first literary newspaper in Colombian history, which sought a space beyond partisan disputes. In 1848, Manuel Ancízar introduced modern machines and a team of printers, draftsmen, painters and lithographers to the country, achieving a great revolution in Colombian journalism and literature. With these new technologies he founded the newspaper El Neogranadino, allowing the beginning of a new stage in the country's press with greater circulation capacity.

=== Journalism in the 20th century: modernization and transformation ===
Towards the 1950s, Colombian journalism, influenced by global transformations and by the country's political, economic and cultural situation, began a process of modernization and commitment to new challenges: the information and communication of transcendental news and stories within daily life. This model was consolidated during the National Front, a political agreement between conservatives and liberals that sought journalism's collaboration to stop the widespread political violence that was experienced in the country during the 1940s.

Journalism understood that it should be a vehicle for democratic ideas, but not for partisan ideologies. Its commitment was made to the defense of the democratic regime and against fanaticism. Some of the most visible newspapers played an essential role in preserving the National Front agreements, avoiding the publication of opinions and comments that could create discrepancies between the two parties. This process generated a kind of self-censorship that, while avoiding new violent confrontations between supporters of liberalism and conservatism, silenced many of the denunciations about the era of La Violencia.

This self-censorship, although it prevented the formation of a consistent public opinion about several atrocious crimes, also allowed the political system to maintain the bipartisan structure, excluding the interests of groups of peasants, settlers, indigenous people and communities far from the center of the country. A void was thus generated in the memory of a generation of Colombians regarding selective murders, expropriations and forced displacements of the era. This omission would have profound consequences on the construction of national historical memory.

Between 1899 and 1902, several newspapers emerged that continue to exist, including El Espectador, founded in Medellín in 1887 and relocated to Bogotá in 1915. El Tiempo became the most widely read newspaper in the country and the one with the greatest political influence. Each region developed characteristic publications, although the vast majority came from the Casa Editorial El Tiempo, the largest newspaper company in Colombia. This media concentration began to raise questions about plurality and informational diversity.

With the arrival of radio in the late 1920s, journalism reached more audiences and began to be conceived for the masses. Immediacy and agility became fundamental premises both for radio stations and for the public, eager for new news. During the 1940s and 1950s the ways of doing journalism were transformed: radio became the preferred medium for middle and popular classes to inform themselves, while newspapers were consolidated as spaces for analysis where politicians and intellectuals gave opinions on and debated facts already consummated.

=== Television, new media and contemporary journalism ===
The government of Gustavo Rojas Pinilla, which had forced some newspapers to close due to their opposition to the regime, paradoxically brought television to the country in 1954. This medium enabled significant social changes and contributed to a broader exercise of press freedom. With television began the definition of the empire of the image as a means of expression and understanding of reality, although, in the eyes of the general public, it seemed to have a "magical" nature that infinitely amplified any discourse or message.

Faced with this new technology, media such as the press and radio sought to reinforce the advantages that had long characterized them. The press managed to preserve its prestige among the dominant classes—political, economic and cultural—although its readership among other sectors of society began to grow progressively. Radio, for its part, continued to be listened to by those who did not have access to other media for economic or geographical reasons. This audience segmentation configured a stratified media system, where each medium served different but complementary publics.

Currently, journalism makes use of traditional media and also of electronic media that emerged at the end of the 20th century. The use of these platforms has transformed and consolidated new ways of exercising the profession, as the press, television and radio began to make use of digital tools to transmit information in various ways. Colombian journalism of the early 21st century has established a more direct dialogue with its audiences through new formats such as neighborhood reporters, opinion blogs and interactive audiovisual specials.

Journalistic work through the Internet, with social networks and digital platforms, has become a practice of global reach. This expansion has generated new possibilities for the transmission of information and a direct influence on social problems. However, users face the challenge of discerning between the overabundance of content and the veracity of sources. Added to this is the crisis derived from advertising revenue and mass layoffs of journalists, which has forced many professionals to undertake independent projects and adapt to a constantly transforming media environment.

Contemporary Colombian journalism possesses immense power. When it has been exercised with ethics, responsibility and objectivity, it has contributed positively to democratic strengthening and the country's social development. However, when it has allowed itself to be influenced by political or economic interests, it has participated in the prolongation or worsening of national crises. The media continue to be, to a large extent, ideological arms of a small economic and political elite that maintains a strong impact on the various spheres of national life.

== Struggle for freedom of expression ==
According to the Foundation for Press Freedom (FLIP), 160 journalists have been murdered in Colombia for reasons related to their profession. Many of these crimes remain without closure, and justice has been on numerous occasions negligent in its investigation. Among the most emblematic cases is Guillermo Cano Isaza, director of the newspaper El Espectador, who publicly denounced the drug trafficking mafia and the financial scandal of the Grupo Grancolombiano, being murdered on December 17, 1986 by hitmen in front of the newspaper's facilities in Bogotá.

Orlando Sierra, deputy director of the newspaper La Patria of Manizales, criticized corruption in Caldas in his column "Punto de Encuentro" and was murdered in front of the newspaper's facilities on January 30, 2002. Jaime Hernando Garzón Forero, lawyer and journalist, used humor to question power, drug trafficking, Colombian society and journalism itself, being murdered by hitmen on August 13, 1999. These events show the risks faced by those who practice investigative and denunciation journalism in Colombia, showing that press freedom has been conquered with sacrifice and requires permanent vigilance for its preservation. The history of journalism in Colombia coincides with the history of the country, constituting an essential element of national collective memory.

== Colombian journalists ==
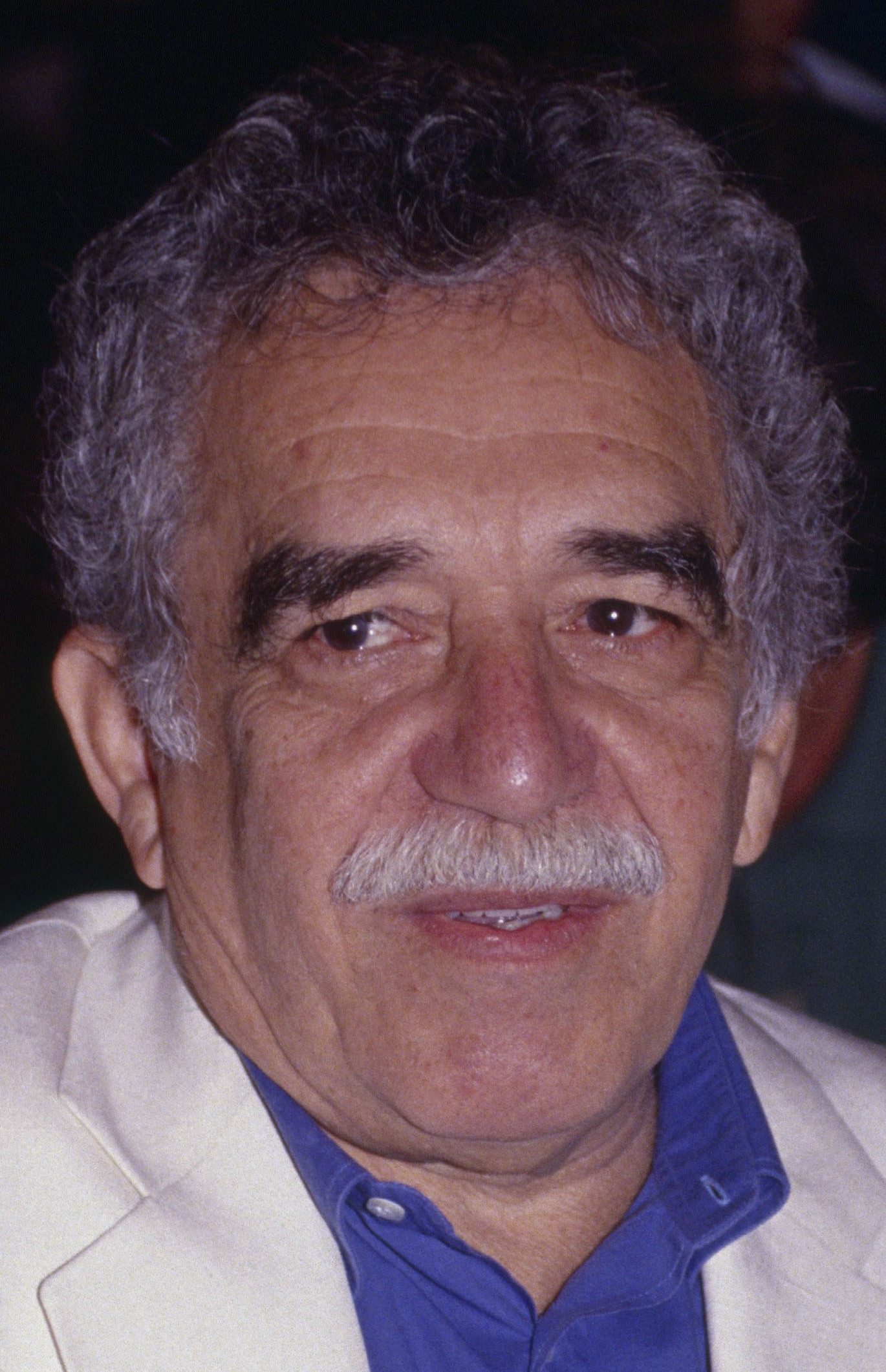
Colombian writer and journalist Gabriel García Márquez, one of the greatest exponents of literary journalism in Latin America.

Colombian journalism has maintained a close relationship with literature, given that numerous outstanding writers of the past and present began their trajectory through journalistic writings. Notable examples include Rufino José Cuervo, Jorge Isaacs, Gabriel García Márquez, Germán Castro Caycedo and Héctor Abad Faciolince. Gabriel García Márquez, Nobel Prize in Literature, began his literary career as a contributor at the daily El Espectador, and the influence of journalism on his work is evidenced in the use of journalistic styles for the narration of his literary texts.

Germán Castro Caycedo distinguished himself through his books, characterized by testimonial accounts about the country's reality. He directed and presented the first journalistic television program recorded outside the studio, addressing profound and denunciation themes. Currently, journalists such as Ginna Morelo, who was editor of the Data Unit of El Tiempo and works for La Liga Contra el Silencio, have managed, through their research on migration, to sensitize public opinion and demonstrate that contextualized data narrates much more of reality. Maryluz Vallejo, reporter, editor and professor at Pontifical Xavierian University, founded the magazine Directo Bogotá and is the author of numerous books on the country's history.

The defense of press freedom constitutes an essential component in the history of Colombian journalism. The Constitution of 1991, in its Article 20, protects this freedom, allowing journalists and media to express their ideas and disseminate news without censorship. However, this freedom carries social responsibilities: the journalist enjoys freedom to inform, but must do so with transparency, truthfulness and awareness of the impact of his work.

== See also ==
- Viceroyalty of New Granada
- Germán Castro Caycedo
- Gabriel García Márquez
- History of journalism
- Gazeta de Colombia
- Gazeta de Santa Fe
