= Rosario Tijeras =

Rosario Tijeras may refer to:

- Rosario Tijeras, a 1999 novel by Jorge Franco (writer)
- Rosario Tijeras (film) (2005)
- Rosario Tijeras (Colombian TV series), TV series by RCN Televisión
- Rosario Tijeras (Mexican TV series), TV series by TV Azteca
- "Rosario Tijeras" (song), song by Juanes
