= Nada Personal =

Nada Personal may refer to:

- Nada personal (album), by Soda Stereo
- Nada personal (1996 TV series), 1996 telenovela
  - "Nada Personal" (song), theme song to the TV series, by Armando Manzanero
- Nada personal (2017 TV series), 2017 telenovela
