= Margarita Muñoz =

Colombian model and actress (born 1987)

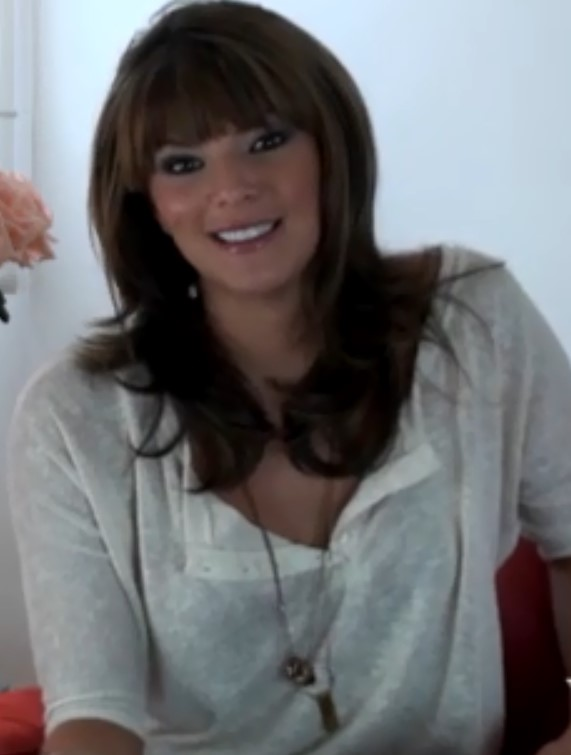
- Margarita Muñoz in 2011.
- Born: María Margarita Muñoz Parra; September 18, 1987 (age 38); Pitalito, Huila, Colombia
- Occupations: Actress; Model
- Years active: 2004-present
- Spouse: Michel Brown (m. 2013)
- Parent(s): Miller Muñoz Ibarra and Clara Parra

María Margarita Muñoz Parra (September 18, 1987 in Pitalito, Huila, Colombia) is a Colombian model and actress who has participated in soap operas for television networks like Caracol TV, RCN, TV Azteca, Televisa and Telemundo.

== Biography ==
She lived in her farm in Pitalito, in this city she studied primary in the School of Presentation and part of her secondary education at the Liceo Andaki. Her dream of becoming a Colombian television made from 13 years for the city of Bogotá. She studied at the school of Julio César Luna.

== Personal life ==
On February 23, 2013 she married the Argentine actor Michel Brown in the Archipelago of San Bernardo, Cartagena, Colombia.

== Career ==
She began her career in television commercial recording, her manager is John Ceballos. She joined the cast of the Caracol TV soap opera El auténtico Rodrigo Leal in 2004 at age 16, playing Valentina Manzur. The production also starred Martin Karpan and Carolina Gómez, along with Juan Pablo Llano.

In 2005 she joined the cast of the RCN telenovela Los Reyes, playing Pilar Valenzuela, known as La Pilarica, a young woman of high social class whose engagement to Santiago Iriarte (Daniel Arenas) is complicated when she falls in love with Leo Reyes (Julián Román). That year she was named among the most beautiful figures in Colombian television by the magazine TV y Novelas.

In October 2007 she starred in the co-production between RCN Television and Televisa, The Clan of the Deceived, filmed in Miami. The cast also included Peruvian actresses Maricielo Effio and Alexandra Grana. The series aired simultaneously in the United States, Mexico and Colombia.

In 2009 she played the villain Isabella Dominguez in the RTI Colombia–Telemundo soap opera Niños ricos, pobres padres, a teenage girl from a wealthy family. The cast included Fabiola Campomanes, Aylin Mujica, Didier van der Hove, Gabriel Valenzuela, Carmen Villalobos, Juan Sebastian Caicedo, Margarita Vega and Javier Jattin.

In 2010 she starred in the Caracol TV production Secretos de familia, playing Victoria "Vicky" San Miguel, a college student caught between two men. She shared the cast with Raquel Ercole, Germán Patiño, Luciano D'Alessandro and Marcela Carvajal.

In 2011 she appeared in the Telemundo telenovela Los Herederos del Monte, playing the antagonist Julieta Millán. The cast included Ezequiel Montalt, Marlene Favela, Mario Cimarro, Diana Quijano and Jose Luis Resendez, among others.

In 2013 she starred in the Mexican adaptation of Gossip Girl, Gossip Girl Acapulco, produced by Warner Brothers, The Mall and Televisa, playing Vanessa Garcia. She shared the cast with Vadhir Derbez, Jon Ecker, Sofia Sisniega, Diego Amozurrutia and Macarena Achaga. She received the Palma de Oro award for best actress in a leading debut role, presented by the National Circle of Journalists AC in Mexico.

In 2014 was the villain of the soap opera Amor sin Reserva of Cadenatres where she played Renata. In this she worked with her husband Michel Brown who was the protagonist.

In 2015 she was the villain of the soap opera Dueños del paraíso of Telemundo, where she played Gina Bianchi. In this she worked with Mexican actress Kate del Castillo, who was the protagonist.

In 2017, she was the protagonist of two different novels in two different countries: Venganza of RCN Televisión in her home country, Colombia and Nada personal of TV Azteca in Mexico. In the first (which is a remake of the American series Revenge), she played Amanda Santana/Emilia Rivera (in the original series her role was played by Emily VanCamp and whose name in the original was Amanda Clarke-Porter/Emily Thorne). In the second (which is an adaptation of the original 1996 version, also from TV Azteca), she played Mariana Aragón (in the original version, the character was called Camila de los Reyes and was played by two different actresses, Ana Colchero and Christianne Gout).

== Filmography ==
Television roles
Year	Title	Roles	Notes
2003	El auténtico Rodrigo Leal	Valentina Mansur	
2005	Los Reyes	Pilar "Pilarica" Valenzuela	
2007	Pocholo	Susana	
2008	La quiero a morir	Andrea Rico	
2009	Niños ricos, pobres padres	Isabella Domínguez	
2010	El cartel	María Luisa Higuera	
2010	Secretos de familia	Victoria Hidalgo San Miguel	99 episodes
2011	Los herederos del Monte	VJulieta Millán	Recurring role; 126 episodes
2013	Gossip Girl: Acapulco	Vanessa García	Recurring role; 22 episodes
2013–2014	Sr. Ávila	Magda "Maggie" Muñoz	Recurring role (seasons 1–2); 9 episodes
2014	Amor sin reserva	Renata Compeán	
2015	Dueños del paraíso	Gina Bianchi	Main cast; 53 episodes
2017	Venganza	Emilia Rivera / Amanda Santana	Main role
2017	Nada personal	Mariana Aragón	Main role; 72 episodes
2018	La Piloto	Andrea	
2022–present	Pálpito	Valeria Duque	
2022	Dejémonos de Vargas	Valentina Restrepo	
2022	Entre sombras	Magdalena Arbeláez	
2024	Marea de pasiones	Helena	
