= Gazeta de Santa Fe de Bogotá =

Former Spanish language newspaper in present-day Bogotá, Colombia

Gazeta de Santa Fe
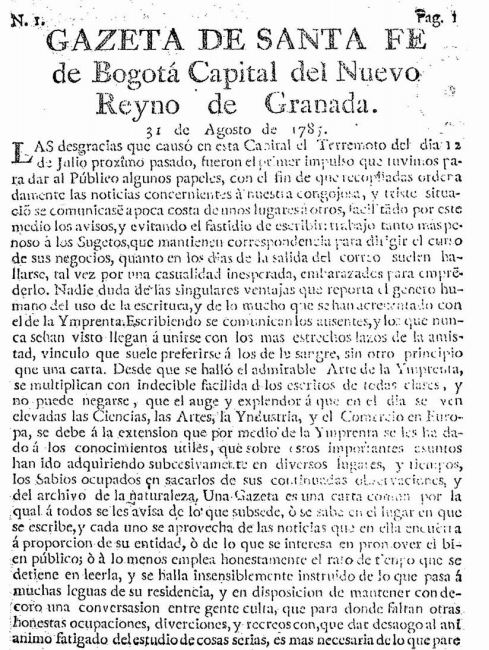
- First edition of the Gazeta de Santa Fe, printed at the Royal Printing Press of Santafé. The publication represents a precursor of the press in the territory of the Viceroyalty of New Granada.
- Native name: Gazeta de Santa Fe de Bogotá, Capital del Nuevo Reino de Granada
- Type: Colonial newspaper
- Format: Print
- Publisher: Royal Printing Press of Antonio Espinosa de los Monteros
- Founded: 1785
- Ceased publication: 1785
- Relaunched: 1811
- Language: Spanish
- Headquarters: Santafé de Bogotá
- Country: Viceroyalty of New Granada

The Gazeta de Santa Fe, whose full name was Gazeta de Santa Fe de Bogotá Capital del Nuevo Reino de Granada, was a newspaper printed at the Royal Printing Press of Antonio Espinosa de los Monteros that circulated from 1785 in the Viceroyalty of New Granada. It is considered the first journalistic publication in Colombian territory, a direct precursor of the national press and one of the earliest manifestations of journalism in Latin America.

Three issues of the 18th-century Gazeta are known. The first, four pages long, was published on 31 August, and the last is dated 30 September 1785. Its content focuses on reporting the 12 July earthquake. Other pieces include correspondence from places such as Mompox about a "Strong Hurricane," the Economic Society of Friends of the Country, and a miraculous event in which Mrs. Buenaventura Ximenez was reportedly saved through the intercession of St. Peter of Alcántara. The final issue details the founding of the College of Our Lady of the Pillar of Education, lists the young women enrolled there, and warns of a measles outbreak.

It was renamed Gazeta de Santafé de Bogotá in the 19th century after the Battle of Boyacá.

== Historical context ==
In the Early Modern period, it was customary to title newspapers with the name Gazeta. The term comes from the Italian gazzetta, a word that designated a small Venetian coin and which, by extension, came to name the handwritten sheets that circulated in Venice during the 17th century. These sheets, filled with accounts of real or fabulous events, were sold by gondoliers in exchange for a gazzetta, which gave rise to the name of the first European newspapers.

During the 18th century, the press began to consolidate in the American colonies as an instrument of cultural and political dissemination. In this context, the Gazeta de Santa Fe emerged as a precursor to the publications that, years later, would accompany the processes of independence and formation of public opinion in the New Kingdom of Granada.

== Origin and publication ==
José de Rioja was a printer active in Cartagena de Indias during the colonial period, with records of his work dating to around 1769. His workshop operated during an early stage of typographic development in the Viceroyalty of the New Kingdom of Granada, when Cartagena, due to its strategic position in Caribbean trade, hosted one of the first stable printing presses in the territory. This is confirmed by the fact that in 1769 he published the Novena to Saint Sebastian bearing his imprint. There are no records regarding his life or origins.

It is also known that in 1773 Rioja sold his printing press to Antonio Espinosa de los Monteros, a peninsular engraver and printer who, after the purchase, moved the equipment and type to Santa Fe de Bogotá. This event proved decisive for the consolidation of the viceregal press, as the acquired materials served as the foundation for the establishment of the Royal Press in the New Kingdom of Granada.

The Gazeta de Santa Fe appeared "with the license of the Superior Government at the Royal Printing Press of Don Antonio Espinosa de los Monteros". Its format consisted of four pages, approximately 20 by 14 centimeters. The stated objective of the publication was to communicate matters of general interest, especially the consequences of the earthquake that occurred in the viceregal capital. In its first edition, the Gazeta defined itself as "a common letter by which everyone is informed of what happens", establishing its informative function as a public service.

Although only three issues are preserved, the contents of the Gazeta de Santa Fe cover a wide thematic variety. They included reports on a donation made by the archbishop viceroy to the victims of the earthquake, the death of an auxiliary sergeant major, a hurricane in Santa Cruz de Mompox, a miraculous birth in Ubaté, a list of nuns and students from the Convent of La Enseñanza, statistical data on Mompox, and a report on a measles epidemic in Quito. These articles reflect the purpose of reporting on recent events in different regions of the viceroyalty, with a clear orientation toward the recording of local events and natural occurrences.

It is evident, then, that the character of the Gazeta was eminently informative, in accordance with its inaugural declaration. It exalted the virtues of the printing press as a means of progress and vehicle for the communication of knowledge. In one of its most cited passages, it states that "how many most useful discoveries would be buried in oblivion, or would not have advanced if they had not been published in the gazettes". This reasoning expresses an early Enlightenment awareness of the role of the press as an engine of knowledge and scientific dissemination, as well as its civilizing function.

== The Gazeta during Independence ==
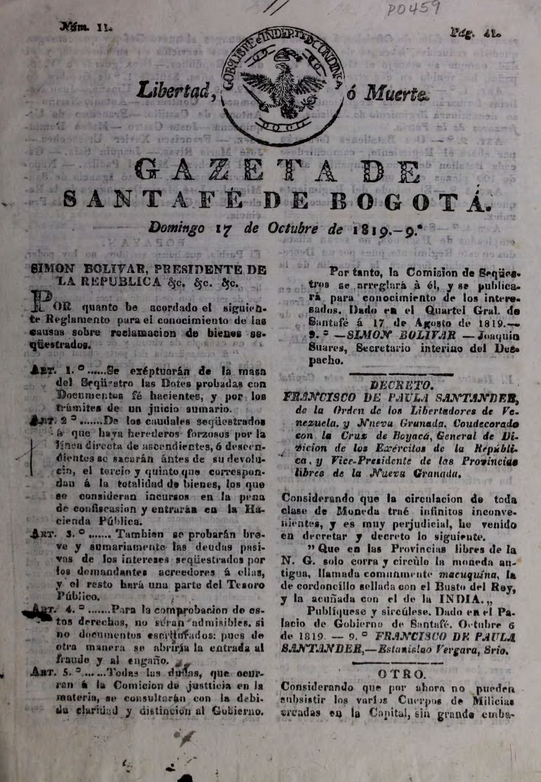
The "Gazeta de Santafé de Bogotá" was a weekly newspaper launched immediately after the independence of New Granada, following the patriots’ victory at the Battle of Boyacá and the capture of the capital.

Although the Gazeta de Santa Fe first appeared in the 18th century during the Viceroyalty of New Granada, it resurfaced several decades later amid the struggles for independence. By then, its title had undergone a minor change: the words Santa Fe were merged into Santafé, giving rise to the Gazeta de Santafé de Bogotá. Between 1816 and 1819, it functioned as a royalist publication, but after the patriot victory at the Battle of Boyacá—which secured political and military control of the Viceroyalty through the capture of its capital—it was taken over by the new republican government and published weekly.

The newspaper was printed at the State Press located in Cundinamarca and distributed throughout the provinces. It served as an effective medium for disseminating decrees issued by the newly proclaimed president, Simón Bolívar, and vice president, Francisco de Paula Santander, during the period when the political and administrative structures of the republic were being formed. In addition, the paper aimed to report on "the state of America’s struggle for independence", publishing news from across Hispanoamérica as well as information about the situation in the provinces of New Granada.

== Legacy ==
The Gazeta de Santa Fe represents the first documented attempt to establish a periodical publication in the capital of the Viceroyalty of New Granada, and constitutes the starting point of journalism in Colombia. Although its existence was brief, it laid the foundations for the creation, in 1791, of the Papel Periódico de la Ciudad de Santafé de Bogotá, founded by Manuel del Socorro Rodríguez, considered the father of journalism in Colombia. This latter newspaper would consolidate the Enlightenment project of a regular press with a pedagogical vocation.

== See also ==
- Viceroyalty of New Granada
- History of journalism in Colombia
- Gazeta de Colombia
