= Azuero =

Azuero may also refer to:

- Azuero Peninsula in Panama
- Azuero province, a province that existed in 1855 in the Republic of New Granada
- Vicente Azuero, Colombian politician
