= La Bruja (TV series) =

Colombian television series

- Starring: Flora Martínez; Andres Parra; Natalia Jerez
- Opening theme: "La Bruja" by Flora Martínez
- Country of origin: Colombia
- Original language: Spanish
- No. of episodes: 30

Production
- Production location: Colombia

Original release
- Release: May 3 – August 3, 2011

La Bruja (The Witch) is a 2011 Colombian telenovela starring Flora Martínez, based on the novel of the same name by Colombian writer Germán Castro Caycedo.

== Story ==
The story takes place in the 1970s in Fredonia, Colombia, and is about a witch and a known mafia boss, and the social and economic effects of the traffic in narcotics, the abuses of authority and corruption, and the influence of the United States in the expansion of the drug trade in Colombia.

== Cast ==
- Flora Martínez: Amanda Mora - La Bruja
- Andrés Parra: Jaime Cruz
- Andrés Toro: Leonel
- María Cecilia Botero Carmen Escobar
- German Jaramillo:Octavio Mejia
- Natalia Jerez: Claudia Mejia
- Vicky Hernandez: Clemencia de Mejia
- Humberto Dorado: Augusto, Gobernador de Antioquia
- Martha Isabel Bolaños: Virgelina
- Laura Londoño: Lina Bedoya
- Kepa Amuchastegui: Presidente de Colombia
- Noelle Schonwald: Leticia
- Luis Mesa: Rodrigo
- Gledys Ibarra: La Negra
- Hada Vanessa: Pilar
- Rebeca Lopez: Esposa del presidente
- Juan Pablo Franco: Hugo
- Manuel José Chávez:Felipe Mejia
- Noëlle Schonwald: Leticia Figueroa
- Carmenza Cossio
- Leonardo Acosta:Fidel
- Mauro Mauad:Pajaro Loco
- Diego Velez: Sacerdote
- Viviana Serna Ramirez: Solita
- Andres Salazar: Toño Mora
- Luis Fernando Montoya: Monseñor
- Héctor García: Montoya
- Carlos Gutiérrez: Maletin
- Christian Tappan: Luis Carlos Estrada
- Pedro Mogollon: Pacho
- Alberto Palacio: Mario Gomez
- Federico Rivera: Quiñonez
