= Nada personal (2017 TV series) =

- Genre: Telenovela
- Created by: Alberto Barrera Tyszka
- Based on: Nada personal by Alberto Barrera Tyszka
- Written by: Leticia López Margalli; Nayura Aragón
- Directed by: Javier Patrón Fox; Fabián Corres; Jorge Ríos
- Creative director: Carlos Herrera
- Starring: Valentino Lanús; Margarita Muñoz; Matías Novoa; Juan Soler; Kika Edgar
- Opening theme: "Nada personal" composed by Héctor Barragán
- Ending theme: "Nada personal" performed by Ximena Sariñana and Jesús Navarro
- Country of origin: Mexico
- Original language: Spanish
- No. of seasons: 1
- No. of episodes: 80

Production
- Executive producers: Fides Velasco; Jacky Castro
- Producer: Elisa Salinas
- Camera setup: Multi-camera
- Production company: TV Azteca

Original release
- Network: Azteca Trece
- Release: May 22 – September 5, 2017

Nada personal (English: Nothing Personal) is a Mexican telenovela produced by TV Azteca. It is a new adaptation of the telenovela written by the Venezuelan author Alberto Barrera Tyszka, which was released in 1996 with the same name. It premiered on May 22, 2017 and ended on September 5, 2017.

The series stars Margarita Muñoz as Mariana, Matías Novoa as Santiago, Valentino Lanús as Alejandro and Juan Soler as Raúl.

== Synopsis ==
Due to a coincidence, Mariana Aragón witnesses the murder of two young journalists. This puts her in the middle of a conspiracy she never imagined. A criminal organization makes her guilty and addicted. For Mariana, fighting for her life involves facing the most powerful criminal organization: the one that works from the legal, within the State.

== Cast ==
- Valentino Lanús as Alejandro Castillo
- Margarita Muñoz as Mariana Aragón
- Matías Novoa as Santiago Leal
- Juan Soler as Raúl Rey
- Kika Edgar as Claudia Campos
- Orlando Moguel as Ernesto
- Héctor Kotsifakis as El Tuétano
- Silvia Carusillo as Silvia Carrasco

== Production ==
Production of the series began on March 28, 2017.

=== Background ===
The trailer for the series was recorded with Gabriela de la Garza in the lead role as Mariana Aragón. At the beginning of the production, De la Garza was confirmed as the main character of the series, but later it was confirmed that the actress had not reached any agreement with Azteca TV to be part of the series.

=== Opening theme ===
The main theme of the telenovela is a new version of the 1996 song "Nada personal" composed by Armando Manzanero and interpreted by Manzanero and Lisset. On May 19, 2017 was published in the account of Azteca Novelas the official video of the song composed by Manzanero and interpreted Ximena Sariñana and Jesús Navarro.
