= Entre sombras (Colombian TV series) =

Colombian telenovela

- Genre: Telenovela
- Created by: Diego Arbeláez
- Written by: Ana María Parra; Diego Vivanco
- Directed by: Andrés Marroquín; Herney Luna
- Starring: Flora Martínez; Margarita Muñoz; Rodrigo Candamil; Patrick Delmas; Brian Moreno
- Theme music composer: Carlos Agüera
- Composer: Octavio Rojas
- Country of origin: Colombia
- Original language: Spanish
- No. of seasons: 1
- No. of episodes: 60

Production
- Executive producer: Juan Carlos Villamizar Delgado
- Editor: Diego Ospina
- Production company: Caracol Televisión

Original release
- Network: Caracol Televisión
- Release: 19 September – 16 December 2022

Entre sombras (English: In the Shadows) is a Colombian telenovela created by Diego Arbeláez. It aired on Caracol Televisión from 19 September 2022 to 16 December 2022. The telenovela follows Julia and Magdalena, agents of an elite group, who seek to solve priority crimes in record time, while also being in the middle of a love triangle with Ivan, a criminalist. The cases featured in the series are inspired by real life events that have been reported in the news magazine show El Rastro. It stars Flora Martínez, Margarita Muñoz, and Rodrigo Candamil.

== Plot ==
The disappearance of a minor in a neighborhood in the south of the city causes alarm among the authorities and prompts Colonel Velendia, head of the judicial police, to immediately instruct Captain Julia Beltrán and Sergeant Magdalena Arbeláez to create a special division, in charge of solving the most promising crimes of their careers in record time. Julia and Magdalena have very different lives. Julia is married and has a son, and Magdalena is looking for her stepfather, who abused her as a child. Julia's personal life takes a turn with the return of Iván, a renowned criminalist who was the love of her life years ago and who abandoned her without an explanation. Magdalena takes an interest in Iván and a love triangle develops as they team up to find those responsible for the most perplexing crimes of their careers.

== Cast ==
=== Main ===
- Flora Martínez as Julia Beltrán
- Margarita Muñoz as Magdalena Arbeláez
- Rodrigo Candamil as Iván Guerrero
- Patrick Delmas as Gerard Chabrol
- Brian Moreno as Teófilo "Teo" Mora
- Julian Díaz as Parra
- Vivian Ossa as Serrano
- Cony Camelo as Sandra Pinzón
- Roger Moreno as Vivanco
- Mario Ruiz as Buitrago
- Ian Valencia as Rodrigo Arbélaez
- Gustavo Angarita as Mayor Raúl Castañeda
- Juan David Galindo as Osorio
- Leonardo Acosta as Coronel Velandia

=== Recurring and guest stars ===
- Jerónimo Barón
- Juan Pablo Franco

== Episodes ==
No.	Title	Original release date	Colombia viewers (Rating points)
1	"La desaparición de una niña genera la creación de la División Especial"	19 September 2022	7.5
2	"La División Especial logra resolver el caso de la niña Ferrucho"	20 September 2022	7.5
3	"Magdalena y Julia reciben una mala noticia mientras atienden el caso de Luis Hernando Vargas"	21 September 2022	6.9
4	"Julia y Teo dan con el nombre del sospechoso del caso"	22 September 2022	6.5
5	"La División Especial hace un trabajo de infiltración para capturar un sospechoso"	23 September 2022	6.2
6	"La División Especial recibe el caso de Alirio Botero, un hombre que fue degollado"	26 September 2022	6.8
7	"Julia y Magdalena están cada vez más cerca de atrapar a Esmeralda Riaño"	28 September 2022	6.0
8	"Esmeralda confiesa uno de sus crímenes luego de un intenso operativo en su contra"	29 September 2022	5.8
9	"La División Especial investiga el asesinato de una madre y su hija"	30 September 2022	5.7
10	"Dos descubrimientos dejan sin palabras a la División Especial"	3 October 2022	6.0
11	"Un nuevo caso genera conflictos en la División Especial"	4 October 2022	6.2
12	"Sin un rumbo fijo, se identifican sospechosos del artefacto explosivo"	5 October 2022	6.5
13	"Con el equipo infiltrado, la División Especial captura a 'El Mono' Uribe"	6 October 2022	5.7
14	"Nicolás, el hijo de Julia, fallece en su casa"	7 October 2022	5.5
15	"Julia busca evadir su realidad con el caso de un homicidio"	10 October 2022	5.2
16	"Una dolorosa verdad para Julia sale a la luz"	11 October 2022	5.3
17	"Los problemas no cesan en la vida personal de Julia y Magdalena"	12 October 2022	4.9
18	"La División Especial obtiene un valioso testimonio, pero ¿será tarde?"	13 October 2022	5.5
19	"Comprometida con su labor, Julia apoya en un nuevo caso"	14 October 2022	5.6
20	"Gerard busca a Julia con la ilusión de recuperar su matrimonio"	18 October 2022	5.0
21	"Julia solicita ayuda de la División Especial para el caso en Villeta"	19 October 2022	5.0
22	"La División Especial logra resolver el caso de Villeta, pero avanza la investigación contra Teo"	20 October 2022	5.2
23	"Homicidio en un taxi: Un nuevo caso llega a la División Especial"	21 October 2022	5.6
24	"Magdalena empieza a dudar sobre la fidelidad de Iván"	24 October 2022	5.0
25	"Una de las amigas de la víctima confiesa mientras otra relación peligra"	25 October 2022	5.2
26	"El equipo recibe un nuevo caso y Magdalena sigue dudando de Iván"	26 October 2022	5.3
27	"La División avanza en el caso de Catalina, pero persisten las dudas"	27 October 2022	5.6
28	"¡Resuelto! La División Especial encuentra el cuerpo de Catalina Escobar"	28 October 2022	5.8
29	"Magdalena sufre un accidente luego de descubrir la infidelidad de Iván"	31 October 2022	6.0
30	"Magdalena es enviada a trabajar con Castañeda luego de su accidente de moto"	1 November 2022	6.7
31	"Magdalena y Julia se enfrentan durante la investigación de Viviana Patiño"	2 November 2022	5.5
32	"La División Especial descubre al verdadero sospechoso del caso de Viviana Patiño"	3 November 2022	6.3
33	"La División Especial identifica un caso similar del pasado que les permite inculpar a Machado"	4 November 2022	7.2
34	"Magdalena investiga a Iván y el equipo recibe un nuevo caso de presunto homicidio"	8 November 2022	5.8
35	"Magdalena descubre el secreto de Iván y le jura a Gerard vengarse de Julia"	9 November 2022	5.8
36	"Tras enfrentar a Magdalena, Iván le cuenta toda la verdad de su pasado a Julia"	10 November 2022	5.7
37	"Magdalena se entera de una noticia que le cambiará la vida"	11 November 2022	5.9
38	"Armando Montoya confiesa lo que hizo con la madre de Magdalena y Rodrigo"	15 November 2022	6.1
39	"Magdalena remueve varios recuerdos y sentimientos de su pasado"	16 November 2022	6.3
40	"Magdalena y Rodrigo le dan el último adiós a su madre y a sus restos"	17 November 2022	6.3
41	"Julia da una rueda de prensa para despistar al sospechoso"	18 November 2022	5.9
42	"Se conocen dos versiones sobre el caso de Silvia, mientras dos policías quedan en peligro"	21 November 2022	6.7
43	"Serrano debe afrontar una dura realidad tras su accidente"	22 November 2022	6.1
44	"Aparecen varias pistas y sospechosos en el caso de Gabriela"	23 November 2022	6.3
45	"La División Especial hace un importante hallazgo y descubre que el caso no fue bien analizado"	24 November 2022	6.6
46	"La División Especial encuentra un nuevo delito en el caso de la muerte de Gabriela"	25 November 2022	6.0
47	"Magdalena se entera del sexo de su bebé, mientras La División Especial recibe un nuevo caso"	28 November 2022	7.0
48	"La División Especial logra capturar a uno de los involucrados en el homicidio"	29 November 2022	7.3
49	"Julia decide seguir su intuición para ir tras una pista más en el caso del forense"	30 November 2022	5.4
50	"¿Se cancela la boda? Lili le dice a Serrano que no podrán casarse y desaparece"	1 December 2022	6.7
51	"Después de una extensa búsqueda, Julia y Serrano encuentran el lugar donde está Lili"	2 December 2022	6.2
52	"En medio de tragos y en un impulso de celos, Teo le confiesa su amor a Magdalena"	5 December 2022	6.7
53	"Magdalena dialoga con Julia sobre su relación con Antonio y le da un consejo sobre el amor"	6 December 2022	6.3
54	"Después de una larga espera, Iván recibe buenas noticas sobre Magdalena y su hija"	7 December 2022	4.9
55	"Magdalena le presenta a su bebé a Julia, en medio de la situación se revive un recuerdo triste"	9 December 2022	5.8
56	"Julia desaparece tras recibir una llamada de Soto para visitarla a su casa, ¿él la secuestró?"	12 December 2022	7.0
57	"Iván y la División Especial descubren que Bisturí fue quien secuestró a Julia"	13 December 2022	6.6
58	"Julia se enfrenta cara a cara a 'Bisturí', aunque no logra escapar de su secuestro"	14 December 2022	6.6
59	"Un enfrentamiento a muerte: La División Especial da con el paradero de Bisturí"	15 December 2022	6.8
60	"Magdalena, Julia e Iván son expuestos a una última prueba para su felicidad"	16 December 2022	6.9

== Release ==
Entre sombras premiered on Caracol Televisión on 19 September 2022. Internationally, the show began streaming on Vix on 30 September 2022.

== Ratings ==
Season	Timeslot (COT)	Episodes	First aired		Last aired		Avg. viewers (in points)
Season	Timeslot (COT)	Episodes	Date	Viewers (in points)	Date	Viewers (in points)	Avg. viewers (in points)
1	Mon–Fri 9:30 p.m.	60	19 September 2022	7.5	16 December 2022	6.9	6.1
