= Itzia, Tango & Cacao =

- Theatrical release poster
- Directed by: Flora Martínez
- Written by: José Reinoso
- Produced by: José Reinoso
- Starring: Flora Martínez
- Cinematography: Richard Ortiz Allende; Robespierre Rodríguez
- Edited by: José Reinoso
- Music by: José Reinoso
- Production company: Prowse SAS
- Distributed by: Cinecolor Films
- Release date: October 26, 2023
- Running time: 88 minutes
- Country: Colombia
- Language: Spanish

Itzia, Tango & Cacao (Spanish: Itzia, tango y cacao) is a 2023 Colombian drama film directed and starred by Flora Martínez in her directorial debut. The rest of the cast includes Patricia Ércole, Hermes Camelo, Julián Díaz, Carmiña Martínez, Jose Acosta Soto, Ana Wills and Julio Pachón. It is about a deaf woman who starts hearing peculiar music coming from nowhere. It premiered on October 26, 2023, in Colombian theaters.

== Synopsis ==
Itzia is a deaf woman who claims to have begun to listen to peculiar music that always comes from the same cardinal point. In the town where she lives, people think she is going crazy and try to convince her to go to the doctor. But Itzia is sure that those melodies are not a product of her imagination. To prove that she is not crazy, she must embark on a journey to find the source of the music.

== Cast ==
- Flora Martínez as Itzia
- Patricia Ércole as Julia
- Gerardo Romano as Ruben
- Julián Díaz as Jared
- Carmiña Martínez as Victoria
- José Acosta Soto as Andrés
- Hermes Camelo
- Ana Wills
- Julio Pachón

== Production ==
Principal photography took place in San Vicente de Chucurí, Santander and Zipaquirá, Colombia.
