= Dejémonos de Vargas =

- Genre: Telenovela
- Created by: Daniel Samper Pizano; Bernando Romero Pereira
- Written by: Guido Jácome
- Directed by: Israel Sánchez; Santiago Vargas
- Starring: Carlos Camacho; Margarita Muñoz; Andrea Guzmán; Aco Pérez; Nataly Umaña; Emmanuel Saldarriaga; Melissa Cabrera; Laura Florez
- Composer: Oliver Camargo
- Country of origin: Colombia
- Original language: Spanish
- No. of seasons: 1
- No. of episodes: 74

Production
- Executive producer: Federico Castillo
- Production company: TeleColombia

Original release
- Network: Canal RCN
- Release: 13 July 2022 – 16 July 2023

Related
- Dejémonos de vainas

Dejémonos de Vargas (English title: Surviving My Family) is a Colombian telenovela produced by TeleColombia for RCN Televisión and a spin-off of the sitcom Dejémonos de vainas, that aired between 1983 and 1998. The telenovela stars Carlos Camacho and Margarita Muñoz. It premiered on Canal RCN on 13 July 2022.

== Plot ==
Dejémonos de Vargas revolves around a typical middle class family, who struggle day by day to cope with the daily problems they face. The family is composed by Ramoncito, who has a streak of bad luck and is looking for a way out of his economic crisis; his wife Valentina, a successful lawyer; and their teenage son Agustín.

== Cast ==
=== Main ===
- Carlos Camacho as Ramón Vargas
- Margarita Muñoz as Valentina Restrepo
- Andrea Guzmán as Mireya Salazar
- Aco Pérez as Juan Caicedo Rojas
- Nataly Umaña as Alejandra Misas
- Emmanuel Saldarriaga as Agustín Julio
- Melissa Cabrera as Camila Salazar
- Laura Florez as Yenniffer Chivata

=== Recurring ===
- Paula Peña as Renata Hermelinda Villegas de Vargas
- Marisol Correa as Margarita Vargas
- Constanza Duque as Lucy
- Maru Yamayusa as Josefa Chivatá

=== Guest stars ===
- Mario Ruiz
- Julio Pachón as Samuel Miranda
- Katherine Giraldo
- Ricardo Saldarriaga
- Valerie Bertagnini
- Giovanny Almonacid
- Tirza Pacheco
- Roberto Roldán
- Carlos Guerrero
- Sebastián Montenegro
- Carlos Vizcaino
- Camilo Morales
- Esperanza Caro
- Gabriel Ramírez

== Ratings ==
The series premiered with 6.3 points in household ratings and initially aired weeknights. Due to low ratings, the series moved to the weekends on 13 August 2022, with Canal RCN rerunning the first twenty-two episodes. New episodes resumed on 16 October 2022.

== Episodes ==
No.	Title	Original release date	Colombia viewers (Rating points)
1	"La nueva vida de los Vargas Restrepo"	13 July 2022	6.3
2	"La llegada de Camila afecta a los Vargas Restrepo"	14 July 2022	5.2
3	"Agustín Julio adopta a un gallo como mascota"	15 July 2022	3.8
4	"Ramón tercero, la nueva mascota de los Vargas Restrepo"	18 July 2022	4.3
5	"Agustín Julio se niega a perder a Ramón tercero"	19 July 2022	2.9
6	"La mala suerte de Ramón Vargas"	21 July 2022	4.0
7	"Ramón llora al perder su empleo"	22 July 2022	3.2
8	"Ramón consigue un nuevo trabajo"	25 July 2022	2.9
9	"Agustín Julio se despide de Ramón tercero"	26 July 2022	3.4
10	"Ramón se reencuentra con Alejita"	27 July 2022	3.4
11	"Camila regresa a su ciudad natal"	28 July 2022	N/A
12	"Vargas le suplica perdón a Valentina"	29 July 2022	3.2
13	"Ramón con matrícula condicional"	1 August 2022	3.8
14	"Agustín y Camila se sinceran con sus padres"	2 August 2022	4.1
15	"Ramón suma puntos con Valentina"	3 August 2022	4.1
16	"El machismo de Ramón y Agustín Julio"	4 August 2022	N/A
17	"Valentina necesita descansar de su familia"	5 August 2022	3.3
18	"El nuevo trabajo de Ramón Vargas"	8 August 2022	4.4
19	"La investigación periodística de Ramón Vargas"	9 August 2022	3.2
20	"Los Vargas Restrepo de juerga"	10 August 2022	4.1
21	"Ramón y Valentina de paseo"	11 August 2022	3.4
22	"Ramón experimenta los efectos del borojó"	12 August 2022	3.4
23	"El desesperante lado hincha de Ramón"	16 October 2022	N/A
24	"Los sueños frustrados de Valentina"	23 October 2022	N/A
25	"La incómoda cena de Los Vargas"	23 October 2022	N/A
26	"Ramón le da clases de fútbol a Camila"	30 October 2022	N/A
27	"Ramón publica un artículo"	30 October 2022	N/A
28	"Valentina confunde a Sebastián Martínez"	6 November 2022	N/A
29	"La primera cita de Agustín Julio"	6 November 2022	N/A
30	"Camila anota su primer gol"	13 November 2022	N/A
31	"Valentina espía a Agustín Julio en el colegio"	13 November 2022	N/A
32	"El viaje de Ramón y Camila a Cali"	20 November 2022	N/A
33	"Ramón se reencuentra con Mireya"	20 November 2022	N/A
34	"Valentina se encuentra con un viejo amor"	27 November 2022	N/A
35	"Ramón recibe una visita inesperada"	27 November 2022	N/A
36	"La última voluntad de Juan Ramón Vargas"	4 December 2022	N/A
37	"Una fiesta de cumpleaños inesperada"	11 December 2022	N/A
38	"El peligroso enemigo del matrimonio de Ramón"	11 December 2022	N/A
39	"Del amor al odio hay un paso: La cena de los Vargas con Mateo"	18 December 2022	N/A
40	"La curiosidad de Agustín inquieta a los Vargas"	18 December 2022	N/A
41	"La anhelada conversación entre Ramón y Mateo"	8 January 2023	N/A
42	"Así fue el matrimonio de los Vargas"	8 January 2023	N/A
43	"El matrimonio de los Vargas pasa por su peor momento"	15 January 2023	N/A
44	"Valentina está celosa por la repentina visita de Mireya"	15 January 2023	N/A
45	"Ramón se va de la casa"	22 January 2023	N/A
46	"Ramón Vargas necesita a Valentina"	22 January 2023	N/A
47	"Ramón y Valentina quieren solucionar sus problemas"	5 February 2023	N/A
48	"Ramón y Valentina se 'reconectan'"	12 February 2023	N/A
49	"Un tatuaje muy creativo"	12 February 2023	N/A
50	"Camila tiene que irse de casa"	19 February 2023	N/A
51	"Un 'amigo' que no es amigo"	19 February 2023	N/A
52	"Ramón, ¿se va a un trabajo nuevo?"	26 February 2023	N/A
53	"Una buena obra que se sale de control"	26 February 2023	N/A
54	"Camila siente la corrupción cerca"	5 March 2023	N/A
55	"¿Valentina es mamá tóxica?"	5 March 2023	N/A
56	"La sorpresa de Camila"	12 March 2023	N/A
57	"La economía de los Vargas está a la baja"	12 March 2023	N/A
58	"¿Los Vargas serán millonarios?"	19 March 2023	N/A
59	"La familia Vargas renace de las cenizas"	19 March 2023	N/A
60	"Nuevos amores nacen en la familia Vargas"	26 March 2023	N/A
61	"No todo lo que brilla es oro en el amor"	2 April 2023	N/A
62	"La cigüeña toca las puertas de los Vargas"	16 April 2023	N/A
63	"Ramón descubre toda la verdad"	23 April 2023	2.3
64	"Los fantasmas del pasado"	30 April 2023	N/A
65	"Suenan campanas de boda"	30 April 2023	N/A
66	"La decepción de Valentina y Alejandra"	7 May 2023	N/A
67	"El mal comportamiento de los hijos de Alejandra"	14 May 2023	1.6
68	"A mal tiempo, buena cara y actitud positiva"	21 May 2023	N/A
69	"El emprendimiento llega a la vida de la familia"	4 June 2023	N/A
70	"Nuevos caminos arriban"	18 June 2023	N/A
71	"Un fallido tesoro escondido"	25 June 2023	N/A
72	"Una ayuda de más nunca sobra"	2 July 2023	N/A
73	"El camino hacia el éxito"	9 July 2023	N/A
74	"Los líos de Ramón Vargas"	16 July 2023	N/A
