= Flora Martínez =

Colombian-Canadian actress and singer (born 1977)

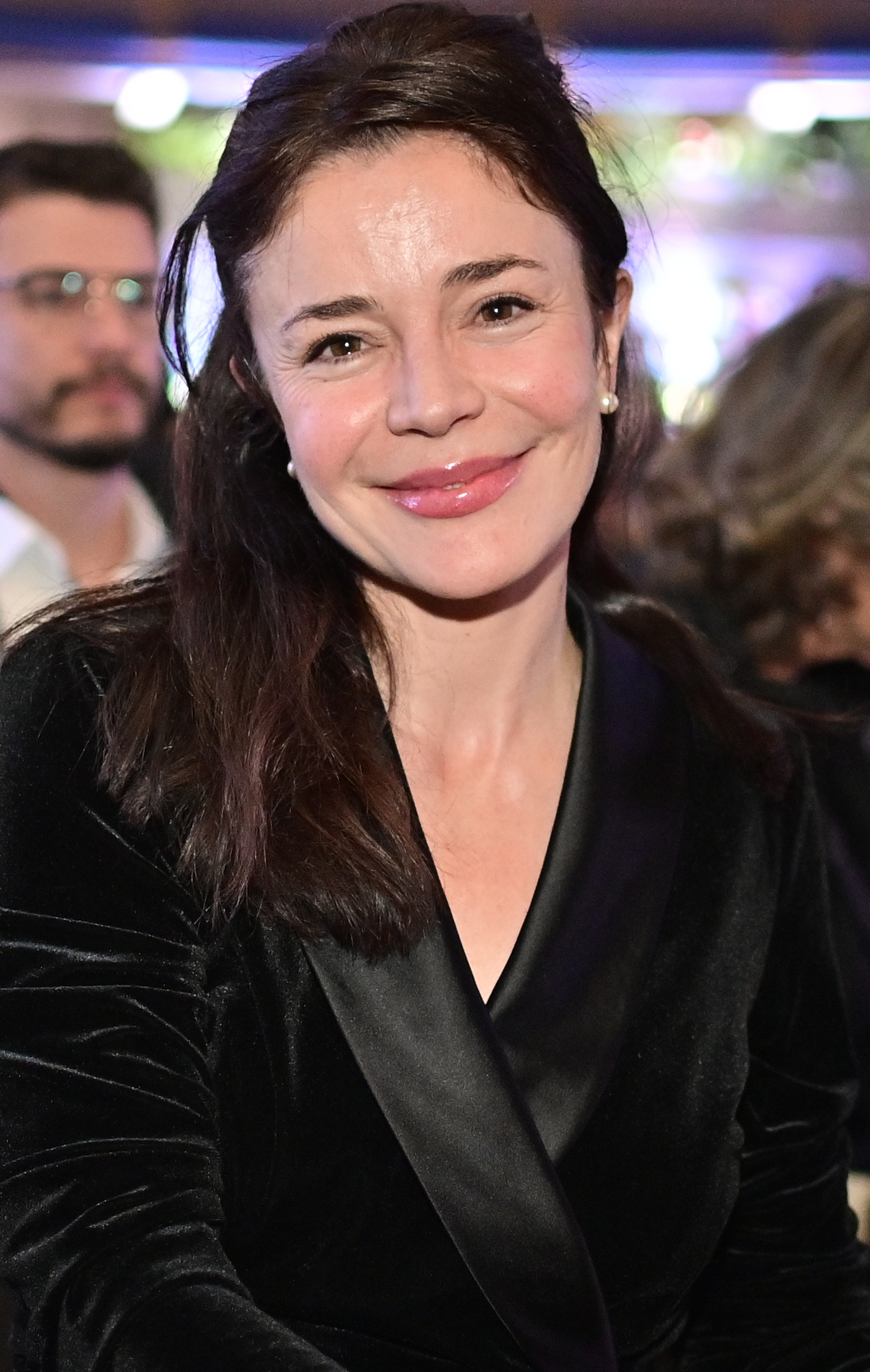
- Flora in 2023
- Born: Flora Martínez; 1 November 1977 (age 48); Montreal, Quebec, Canada
- Occupations: Actress; singer
- Years active: 1994–present

Flora Martinez (born 1 November 1977) is a Colombian actress and singer, known for her title role in the 2005 film Rosario Tijeras.

== Biography ==
Martinez was born in Montreal to a Canadian mother and a Colombian father, and raised in Bogotá and North Vancouver. She began her career in television in Colombia appearing in telenovelas such as Mambo (1994), María Bonita (1995), and La Otra Mitad del Sol (1995). She is a Canadian citizen and speaks fluent French, Spanish and English.

She studied at the Actors Conservatory in New York City from 1997 through 1999. In 1999, she appeared in her first feature film, Soplo de Vida, for which she won the Best Actress Award at the Biarritz Film Festival in France. She has worked in the theater in the staging of Herat by Daniel Berardi.

Martinez starred in Lolita's Club (2007), I'm With Lucy (2002) and Violet of a Thousand Colors (2005). In 2011, she starred as the lead of the television series La Bruja (The Witch).

== Filmography ==
Year	Title	Role	Notes
1994	Mambo	N/A	
1995	Leche	Susana	
1995	María Bonita	Imelda Santos	
1996	La otra mitad del sol	Isabel	
1999	Divorciada	Eva	
1999	Soplo de vida	Golondrina/Pilar, the dead woman	Biarritz Film Festival Award for Best Actress
2000	Proof of Life	Linda	
2002	I'm with Lucy	Melissa	
2002	The Secret Lives of Dentists	Female Patient (as Flora Martinez)	
2003	Law & Order	Tina	Episode: "Seer"
2004	La Saga, Negocio de Familia	Marlene (young)	
2004	Downtown: A Street Tale	Maria	
2005	La ley del silencio	Natalia Aguirre	
2005	Rosario Tijeras	Rosario Tijeras	Cartagena Film Festival - Award Golden India for Best Actress; Malaga Film Festival - Award Silver Biznaga for Best Actress
2005	Violeta de mil colores	Violeta	
2007	Tuya siempre	Lola	
2007	Canciones de amor en Lolita's Club	Milena	
2008	Tiempo final	Alejandra / Ines	
2008	Vecinos	Tatiana	Nominated - TVyNovelas Award for Best Lead Actress
2008	Arte de Roubar	Lola	
2010	Lastrain	Irene	
2010	Di Di Hollywood	María	
2011	La Bruja	Amanda Mora	
2012	Breve storia di lunghi tradimenti	Mabel	
2016	2091	Sonia (wife of Enrique Bogarin) /	and S.O.N.I.A (artificial intelligence)
2022	Entre sombras	Julia Beltrán	
2023	Itzia, Tango & Cacao	Itzia	Also director, Directorial debut
2026	Eva Lasting	Teresa Burgos de Samper	
