= Undercurrent (1998 film) =

1998 film directed by Frank Kerr

- Original poster art
- Directed by: Frank Kerr
- Written by: Wayne Behar
- Produced by: Wayne Behar; Paul Boghosian
- Starring: Lorenzo Lamas; Brenda Strong; Frank Vincent; Daniel Lugo
- Cinematography: Carlos Gaviria
- Edited by: Thomas Fries
- Music by: Christopher Lennertz
- Production company: Fries Film Group
- Distributed by: Avalanche Home Entertainment
- Release date: June 23, 1998
- Running time: 94 minutes
- Countries: United States; Puerto Rico
- Language: English

Undercurrent is a 1998 American–Puerto Rican neo-noir crime film directed by Frank Kerr, starring Lorenzo Lamas, Brenda Strong and Frank Vincent. Lamas stars as a down-on-his-luck American living in Puerto Rico, who gets paid to frame a woman for adultery and finds himself dragged into a murder intrigue.

== Cast ==
- Lorenzo Lamas as Mike Aguayo
- Brenda Strong as Renee Rivera
- Frank Vincent as Eddie Torelli
- Daniel Lugo as Detective Leone
- Christianne Gout as Illiana Vasquez
- Axel Anderson as Carlos Rivera Sr.
- Jaime Bello as Evandro Colhero
- Hector Travieso as Rafael Rivera
- Carlos Esteban Fonseca as Detective Duarte
- Rafael Fuentes as Luis the Bartender

== Production ==
The creative principals behind Undercurrent have roots in the Boston area, and it was the first feature from Belmont-based producer Paul Boghosian after several documentaries. The film drew its inspiration from 1940s romantic thrillers, and shares its name with one such film from 1946. PRITCEFF (Puerto Rico Investors Tax Credit Enhanced Film Fund), an incentive program created by the Puerto Rican government, also lent its support to the project. It was supposed to be followed by a second Puerto Rican joint venture tentatively called Primal Rage, but that apparently did not eventuate.

The film was shot in Puerto Rico, where it is set, in the spring of 1997. Old San Juan, the capital city's historic district, was the main location and key scenes were shot at the former Carmelite convent turned luxury hotel, El Convento. Undercurrent was the first film collaboration for Denise Hajjar, a Boston fashion designer who had dressed local TV personalities. She traveled with the crew, and brought with her the pieces that made up Strong's wardrobe, which were taken from her recent collections. However, she selected the male characters' clothes from three different Puerto Rican boutiques to follow the mandate that each must have a distinct look.

== Release ==
=== Pre-release ===
Undercurrent was initially intended by the producers for a premium cable premiere. The picture was screened on April 11, 1998, at a Latin American film festival hosted by the Boston Museum of Fine Arts, in presence of director Frank Kerr and producer Paul Boghosian. A theatrical premiere was also organized in Puerto Rico the following month.

=== Release ===
The film premiered domestically on VHS and DVD through Lions Gate Entertainment via their Avalanche Home Entertainment label on July 27, 1999.

=== Reception ===
Undercurrent has received mixed reviews. In his book A Comprehensive Encyclopedia of Film Noir, film historian John Grant praised the "great cinematography of Puerto Rican coastal scenery" and assessed that "the screenplay has some interest, but Lamas' woodenness more or less dooms proceedings." In Ante el lente extranjero, an examination of foreign films shot in his country, Puerto Rican academic Luis Trelles Plazaola wrote that "two acceptable action sequences, one at the beginning and one at the conclusion" were to the film's credit, while the rest was "a reiteration of common tropes, frequent nudity and scenes of simulated sex, with little conviction put into a story of betrayals and twists." He did acknowledge the performance of local actor Daniel Lugo, while judging that Lamas and Strong's pairing relied more on their sex appeal than on their performances. TV Guide wrote that "[t]he doublecrosses are neatly woven into the fabric of this derivative crime picture, but neither screenwriter Wayne Behar nor director Frank Kerr can stay ahead of the jaded audience." However, it deemed that "the chemistry between Lamas and Strong is striking".
