= Rosario Tijeras (Colombian TV series) =

- Genre: Telenovela
- Created by: Carlos Duplat; Luz Mariela Santofimio
- Story by: Jorge Franco
- Directed by: Carlos Gaviria; Rodrigo Lalinde; Israel Sánchez
- Creative directors: Juan Fernando Pérez; Aníbal Silva
- Starring: María Fernanda Yépez; Sebastián Martínez; Andrés Sandoval
- Country of origin: Colombia
- Original language: Spanish
- No. of episodes: 60

Production
- Executive producer: Ángela Pulido Serrano
- Producer: Juan Pablo Posada
- Cinematography: Sergio García
- Production company: Teleset

Original release
- Network: RCN
- Release: 8 February – 28 July 2010

Related
- Rosario Tijeras

Rosario Tijeras is a Colombian telenovela produced by Ángela Pulido Serrano for RCN Televisión. It is based on the book of the same name written by Jorge Franco. The series originally aired from 8 February 2010 to 28 July 2010. It stars María Fernanda Yépez as the titular character.

It tells the story of Rosario, a beautiful but dangerous woman who lived a childhood marked by pain and abuse. This triggered a thirst for violence and vengeance in her.

== Plot ==
The series tells the story of Rosario, a young woman living in Comuna 13, one of the roughest neighborhoods in Medellin, Colombia. Trying to survive in this harsh environment she will adapt and become wrapped up in her brother John F's business of sicario.

She has a stormy love with a pair of inseparable friends from wealthy families: Antonio de Bedout (Andrés Sandoval) and Emilio Echegaray (Sebastián Martínez).

Their separate lives intersect through Rosario, drawing them into a world of danger and violence in which she is both a victim and a cause of death.

== Cast ==
=== Main ===
- María Fernanda Yépez as Maria del Rosario
- Sebastián Martínez as Emilio Echegaray
- Andrés Sandoval as Antonio de Bedut
- Luis Carlos Fuquen as Francisco
- Juan David Restrepo as Johnefe
- Julián Mora as Ferney
- Adriana Arango as Rubí
- Margarita Ortega as Martha Lucia Betancourt
- Luis Fernando Hoyos as Luis Eduardo Betancourt
- Natalia Jeréz as Paula Restrepo
- Victoria Góngora as Susana
- Laura Perico as Leticia Betancourt

=== Recurring ===
- Emerson Rodríguez as Jota
- Andrés Felipe Torres as "El Tigre"
- Valentina Gómez as Yolima
- Juan Felipe Barrientos as Klaus
- Estefanía Borge as Samantha
- Yuri Vargas as Zulai
- Orlando Miguel as Mr. Robinson
- Ana María Kámper as Ana de Echegray

== Remake ==
A Mexican remake, Rosario Tijeras, premiered on 30 October 2016 on TV Azteca, starring Bárbara de Regil and José María de Tavira.
