= Fibra óptica =

- Directed by: Francisco Athié
- Written by: Francisco Athié
- Starring: Christianne Gout; Roberto Sosa; Lumi Cavazos; Angélica Aragón; Alberto Estrella
- Release date: 1998
- Running time: 105 minutes
- Country: Mexico
- Language: Spanish

Fibra óptica ("Fibre Optic") is a 1998 Mexican film.

== Cast ==
- Roberto Sosa - Marco Antonio Gutiérrez
- Lumi Cavazos - María Ponce
- Angélica Aragón - Doña Carmen
- Alberto Estrella - The Young Executive
- Eduardo Ocaña - Licenciado Magaña
- Mónica Ribeiro - Claudia Jiménez
- Jorge Galván - The Informer
- Christianne Gout - Rebeca (as Christiane Gout)
- Guillermo Huesca - Messenger
- Emilio Guerrero -Doctor
