= Gazeta de Colombia =

19th-century official newspaper of Gran Colombia

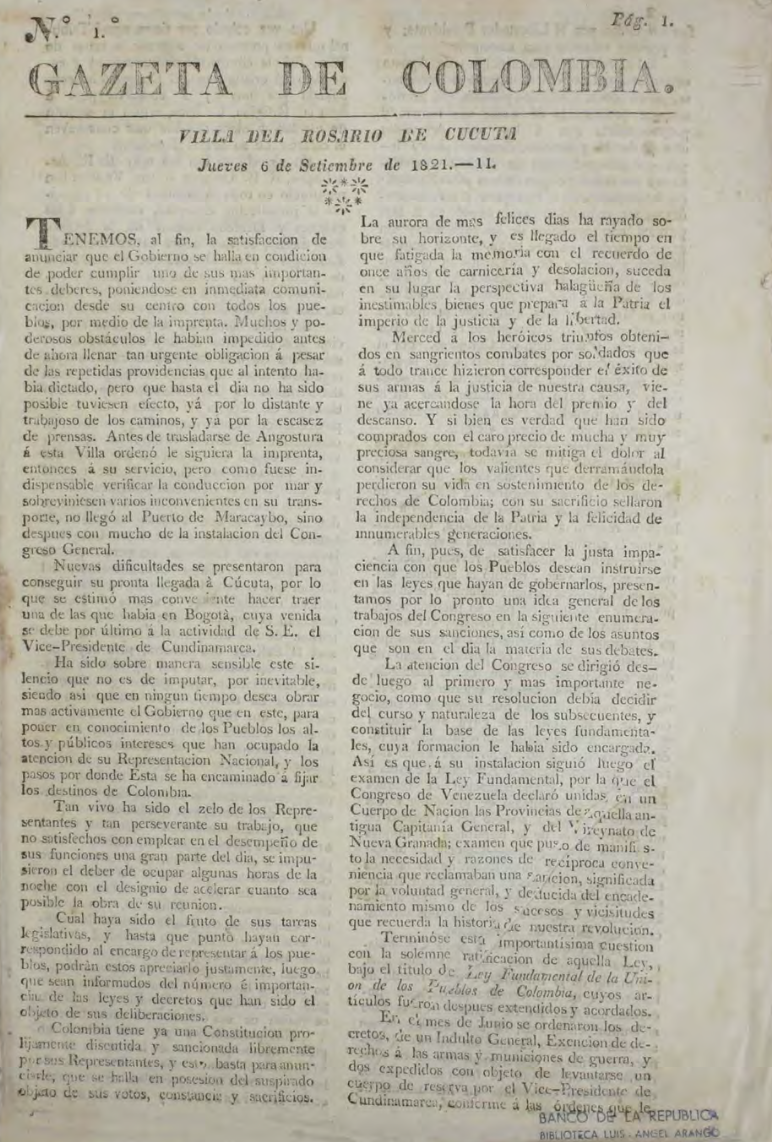
- First issue of the Gazeta de Colombia, published on September 6, 1821.
- Type: Official and political newspaper
- Format: 35x25 cm (approx. one octavo)
- Publisher: Miguel Santa María; Vicente Azuero; Casimiro Calvo
- Editor: Casimiro Calvo
- Founded: September 6, 1821
- Ceased publication: December 29, 1831
- Language: Spanish
- Headquarters: Villa del Rosario de Cúcuta (1821); Bogotá (1822–1831)
- Circulation: 800 copies

The Gazeta de Colombia (titled Gaceta de Colombia from its 13th edition) was one of the first Colombian periodicals to emerge after independence and served as the official dissemination organ of the government of the Republic of Colombia (historiographically known as Gran Colombia). It published its first issue in Villa del Rosario de Cúcuta on September 6, 1821, circulated widely both nationally and internationally, and published its final edition in Bogotá on December 29, 1831.

The newspaper was created to spread the foundations of public opinion in the new Republic and address topics of economic structuring, educational reforms, laws, foreign relations, and justice. Because of this, it is considered an eminently political publication that sought to strengthen the unification of the territory and promulgate the structuring of a liberal state under the tutelage of its main leaders.

== History ==
=== Foundation and first stage (1821–1826) ===
In 1821, a Constituent Assembly was held in Cúcuta with the objective of administratively unifying the new republic. Within the framework of the congress, the establishment of a national printing press was requested to allow the publication of an official organ, which gave rise to the Gazeta de Colombia.

The initial direction of the newspaper was entrusted to the Veracruz-born diplomat Miguel Santa María, who edited it until October 14, 1821, when he was sent to Mexico. With the transfer of the government to Bogotá in January 1822, the newspaper changed its official name to Gaceta de Colombia and the direction fell to Vicente Azuero, who requested to resign months later. The position of editor then passed to Casimiro Calvo, chief official of the Secretariat of the Interior led by José Manuel Restrepo, and who would manage the publication for most of its existence. Vice President Francisco de Paula Santander and Jerónimo Torres were frequent contributors to the publication, often using it to defend the nascent constitution and attack their political opponents.

During these early years, the Gaceta functioned as a platform for legitimizing the executive power headed by Santander. From its pages, significant reforms were promoted, such as the structuring of the tax system, the abolition of the Tribunal of the Inquisition, the debate over the Royal Patronage, and state control over tithes. It also dedicated ample space to public education, promoting the Lancasterian system of mutual instruction and the inclusion of modern and liberal authors like Jeremy Bentham and Benjamin Constant in the curricula, which provoked strong tensions with the Catholic Church.

=== Republican crisis and Bolívar's dictatorship (1827–1831) ===
Starting in 1826, Gran Colombia began to fracture due to separatist tensions, especially with the rebellion of José Antonio Páez in Venezuela (a movement known as La Cosiata). During this period, the Gaceta de Colombia turned to fervently defending the authority of the central government in Bogotá and delegitimizing the opposition newspapers that advocated for federalism or the disavowal of the 1821 constitution.

Following the return of Simón Bolívar in 1827 and the subsequent failure of the Convention of Ocaña in 1828, Bolívar assumed dictatorial powers as "Supreme Magistrate." The newspaper underwent an editorial shift forced by the circumstances, going from being the means of justifying Santander's liberal policies to becoming the main organ of legitimization for Bolívar's personalist regime. Decrees were published suppressing the teaching of certain civil law texts, and the publication was used to incriminate those responsible for the September Conspiracy of 1828, which led to Santander's exile.

With the resignation and subsequent death of the Liberator, coupled with the definitive separation of Venezuela and Ecuador, Gran Colombia came to an end. The last issue of the Gaceta de Colombia circulated on December 29, 1831, being replaced shortly after by the Gaceta de la Nueva Granada.

== Edition and format ==
=== Printing and circulation ===
In its foundational stage, it was published twice a week (Thursday and Sunday), but after its move to Bogotá, it adopted a weekly Sunday periodicity so as not to compete with other republican newspapers. Towards the end of its existence, in 1831, it resumed its biweekly frequency due to the volume of government provisions. An average of 800 copies were printed. A portion was distributed free of charge among government authorities and employees, around 330 copies were sent outside the Republic, and the rest were allocated for direct sale and subscriptions in post offices throughout the country (including Caracas, Maracaibo, Santa Marta, Panama, Guayaquil, and Quito).

Different workshops and printers were in charge of its physical production, among which Bruno Espinosa (Printer of the General Government of Colombia), Nicomedes Lora, Jayme Cowie, Antonio Mora, Manuel María Viller, Pedro Cubides, and J. A. Cualla stood out.

=== Structure and content ===
Initially, it consisted of four pages with two or three columns. Following the publication of issue 171 on January 23, 1825, the newspaper formalized its division into two main sections:

- Official part: Grouped laws, Congressional decrees, appointments, foreign relations, administration of justice, and executive dispatches. The editors warned that they did not assume personal responsibility for these texts, as they emanated from the government.
- Unofficial part: Intended to group diverse non-governmental opinions, political articles ("moderate and practical"), international news, public education reports, patriotism, and a military necrology section honoring those who fell for independence.

In addition, it featured sections for notices and advertising, ranging from the promotion of vacancies and illustrated texts (such as bodies of law, grammars, or economics treatises) to the sale of real estate, pianos, and seeds.

== See also ==
- Gran Colombia
- Constitution of Cúcuta
- Gazeta de Santa Fe de Bogotá
- History of journalism in Colombia

== Bibliography ==
- Bushnell, David (2006). Ensayos de historia política de Colombia siglos XIX y XX. Medellín: La Carreta Editores E.U.
- Cacua Prada, Antonio (1968). Historia del periodismo colombiano. Bogotá: Fondo Rotario de la Policía Nacional.
- Otero Muñoz, Gustavo (1998). Historia del periodismo en Colombia. Santafé de Bogotá: Universidad Sergio Arboleda.
- Palacios, Marco; Safford, Frank (2002). Colombia: país fragmentado, sociedad dividida, su historia. Bogotá: Grupo Editorial Norma.
