= Jorge Franco (writer) =

Colombian writer

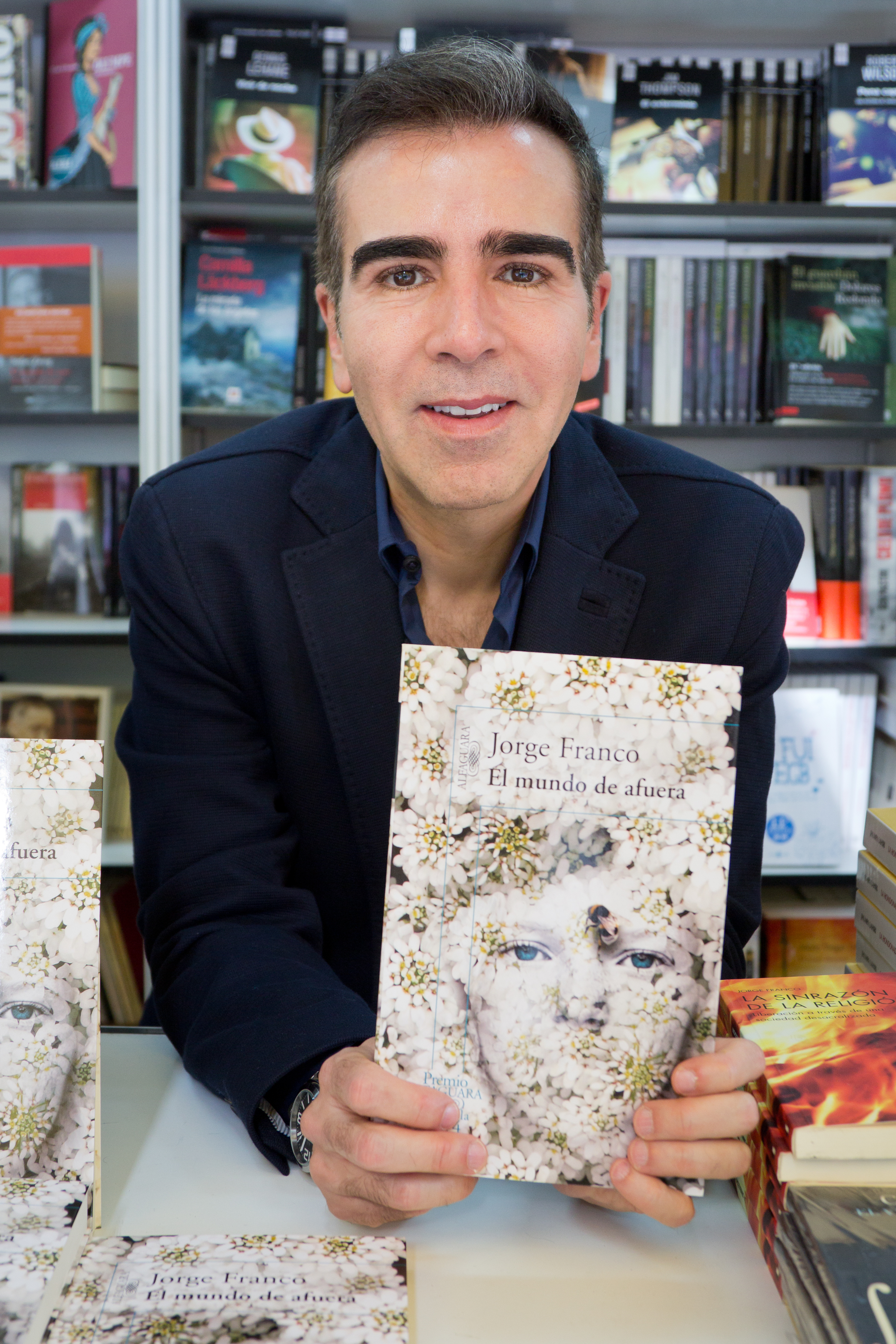
Jorge Franco at the Madrid Book Fair 2014 with his book El mundo de afuera.

Jorge Franco Ramos (born 1962 in Medellín) is a Colombian writer, known primarily for his novel Rosario Tijeras, which has been adapted for film and television.

== Biography ==
Son of Olga Stella Ramos and Humberto Franco, married with Natalia Echavarria and has a daughter named Valeria Franco. Jorge Franco Ramos studied film at the London Film School and literature at the Pontificia Universidad Javeriana in Bogotá, but did not finish his studies. He began his writing career in 1991 and obtained his first award, the Pedro Gómez Valderrama, in 1996 for the short story collection Maldito amor (Cursed love). His first novel, Mala noche (Bad night), won the national Ciudad de Pereira competition of 1997.

His second novel Rosario Tijeras was published in 1999 and won the Premio Beca Nacional Colcultura and the Premio yermen pajaro of the literature event referred to as Semana Negra (Black week) in the Spanish city Gijón in 2000.

The Mexican film maker Emilio Maillé adapted this novel for film under the title Rosario Tijeras in 2005. In 2010 the RCN TV made a television adaptation, composed of 60 episodes and starring Maria Fernanda Yepes.

His third novel Paraíso Travel (Paradise Travel) was also made into a film by Colombian director Simon Brand. It was released in January 2008 with a musical score directed by renowned Colombian singer Fonseca.

In March 2014 Franco won the XVII edition of the international Alfaguara prize with his work "El mundo de afuera" (The world from outside).

Gabriel García Márquez has stated about the artist that he "is one of the Colombian writers to whom I wish to pass the torch."

== Awards and honors ==
- 1996 Pedro Gómez Valderrama, Maldito amor
- 1997 Ciudad de Pereira, Mala noche
- 2000 Premio Beca Nacional Colcultura, Rosario Tijeras
- 2000 Premio Dashiell Hammett of the Semana Negra de Gijón, Rosario Tijeras
- 2014 Premio Alfaguara de Novela, El mundo de afuera

== Works ==
- Maldito amor (1996, stories)
- Mala noche (1997, novel)
- Rosario Tijeras (1999, novel)
- Paraíso Travel (2002, novel)
- Melodrama (2006, novel)
- Santa Suerte (2010, novel)
- Don Quijote de la Mancha en Medellín (2012, novel)
- El mundo de afuera (2014, novel)
- El cielo a tiros (2018, novel)
- El vacío en el que flotas (2023, novel)
