= Christianne Gout =

Mexican dancer and actress

Christianne Gout is a Mexican dancer and actress, who began her career as an actress in a Venezuelan TV series La Inolvidable and was especially known as a heroine of the film Salsa by Joyce Sherman Buñuel.

== Filmography ==
- Salsa a French Spanish film (2000) .... Nathalie

... a.k.a. ¡Salsa! (Spain)

- Acapulco H.E.A.T. an American Canadian TV series.... T.C. Doyle (1 episode, 1999)

- Code Name: Cumshaw (1999) TV episode .... T.C. Doyle

- Undercurrent (1999) .... Illiana Vasquez
- Fibra óptica (1998) (as Christiane Gout) .... Rebeca

... a.k.a. Optic Fiber (USA: video title)

- Nada personal (TV series) (1997) Mexican TV series of 400 episodes .... Camila de los Reyes
- La Inolvidable (1996) TV series ... María Teresa Montero
