= La Bagatela =

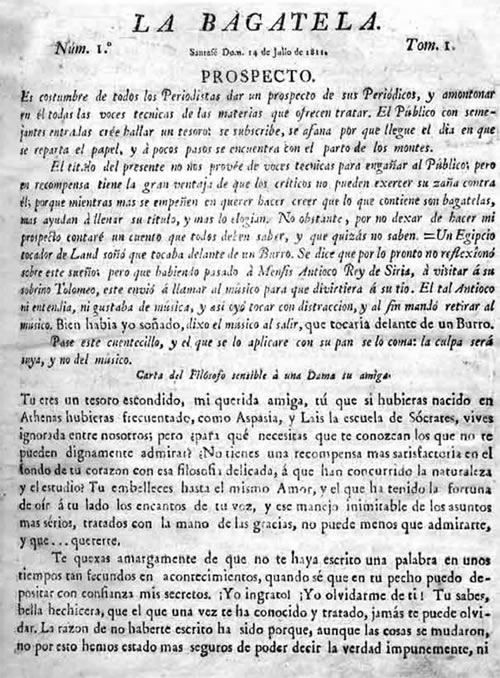
- 14 July 1811 issue
- Type: Weekly newspaper
- Publisher: Antonio Nariño
- Founded: 1811
- Political alignment: Pro Independence
- Language: Spanish
- Headquarters: Bogotá, Colombia

La Bagatela was a Colombian political weekly. It was founded by Antonio Nariño.
