= Nada personal (song) =

Song by Armando Manzanero

Nada Personal is a song written by Armando Manzanero that was the theme song for the telenovela of 1996 Nada personal directed by Antonio Serrano.

The song was included in the album of the same name and again in 1993 in the album Mis Canciones Favoritas both of Manzanero. The first is still considered one of the most successful albums of Azteca Music. The song was recorded a third time in the 2005 album Esencial of Spanish singer Ana Torroja, ex lead singer for Mecano. The song is a duet with Manzanero.

The song talks about a man who has a relationship with someone he lives with but there is "nothing personal". The reason that there is nothing personal in the relationship is because the two share so much.
