= Vicente Azuero =

Colombian lawyer, politician, and journalist (1787–1844)

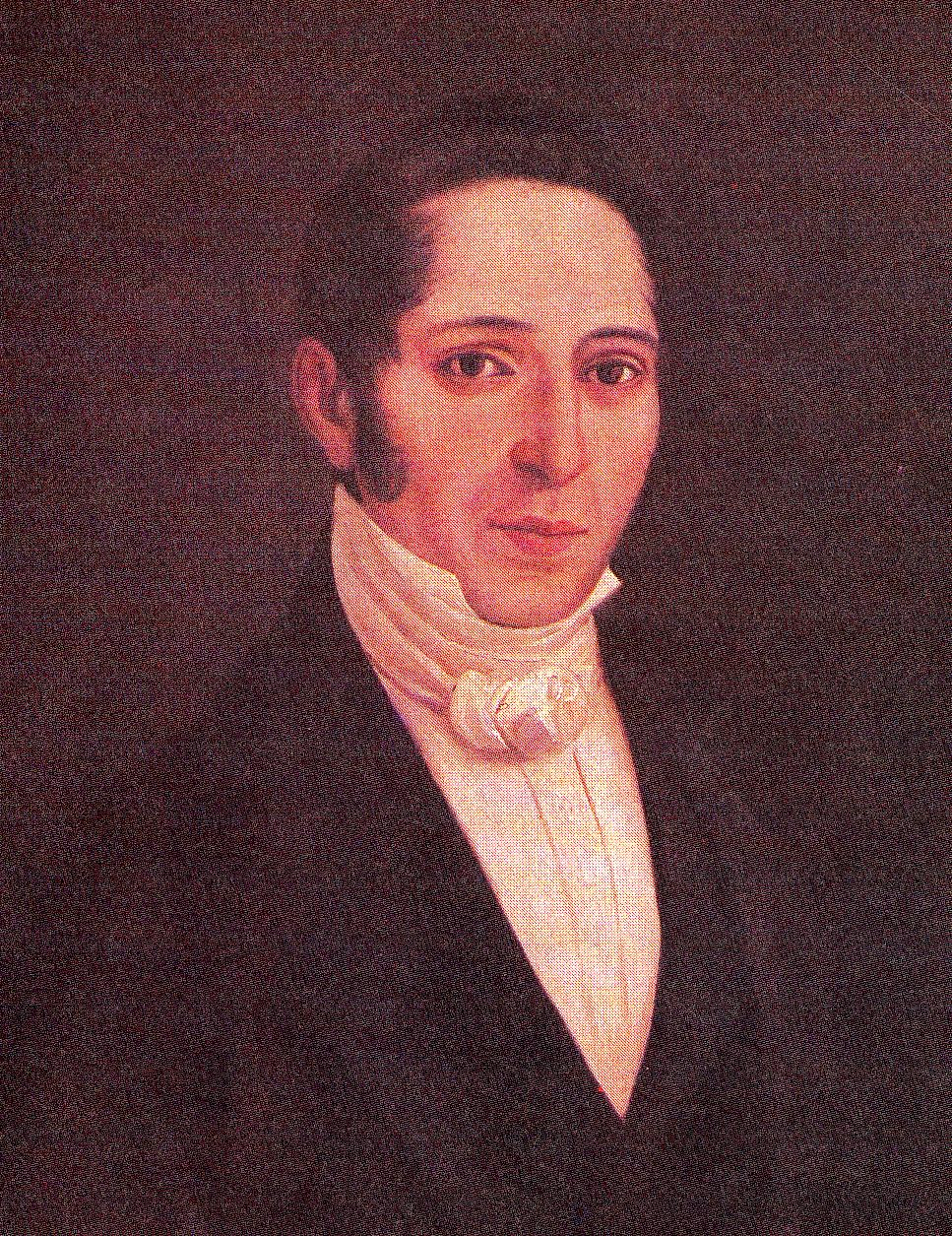
- Born: Vicente de Azuero y Plata; April 21, 1787; Oiba, Viceroyalty of New Granada
- Died: September 28, 1844 (aged 57); La Mesa, Republic of New Granada
- Resting place: Central Cemetery of Bogotá
- Occupations: Lawyer, politician, journalist
- Political party: Liberal Party
- Spouse: Indalecia Ricaurte y Castro
- Children: Rufino Azuero Ricaurte
- Parent(s): Ignacio Javier Azuero; Micaela Gregoria Plata
- Relatives: Antonia Santos Plata (cousin); Manuel Plata Azuero; Juan Nepomuceno Azuero (brother); Joaquín Ricaurte Torrijos (father-in-law); Floresmiro Azuero; Rafael Azuero Manchola

Vicente de Azuero y Plata (Oiba, April 21, 1787 – La Mesa, September 28, 1844) was a Neogranadine lawyer, politician, and journalist.

He publicly argued against the usefulness of religious communities in the nation and was one of the main authors of the legislation that suppressed convents with few members in the 1820s and 1830s. He was active in public and legislative life, and is considered one of the political and ideological precursors of the Colombian Liberal Party.

== Biography ==
He was born in Oiba, in the Socorro province, the legitimate son of Ignacio Javier Azuero, who served as the town's chief mayor, and Micaela Gregoria Plata. He was the younger brother of Juan Nepomuceno Azuero, a religious figure who actively participated in favor of New Granada's independence.

He studied at the Colegio Mayor de San Bartolomé in Santafé, where he graduated with a degree in law. While still a student, he taught the Latinity class and, later, Public Law, a position he obtained permanently through a competitive examination. He stood out among his classmates for his dedication to his studies, receiving a doctorate in theology, civil law, and canon law. Later, at the Santo Tomás University, he graduated in canon law.

=== War of Independence ===
Azuero participated in the events of July 20, 1810, and joined the National Guards battalion that emerged in the following days, where he reached the rank of second lieutenant; holding various positions during this period. During the Spanish Reconquest, he was taken prisoner, but he managed to escape after the patriot victory at the Battle of Boyacá in 1819.

=== Gran Colombia and educational work ===
During the existence of Gran Colombia, Azuero returned to public life and established himself as a key figure in republican education. He served as Minister Judge of the High Court of Justice of the Republic. At the same time, in November 1824, he won the chair of Political Economy at the Colegio de San Bartolomé by opposition, and in 1825 he won the chair of Public Law; he was also appointed prosecutor of the institution. In August 1826, he was appointed adjunct to the Director of Studies and, months later, a member of the National Academy in the Moral and Political Sciences section.

As part of the Education Commission created by Vice President Francisco de Paula Santander, he participated in the founding of several universities and promoted a curriculum that included teaching authors such as Jeremy Bentham, Benjamin Constant, and Emer de Vattel. This stance generated strong friction with the clergy. In 1826, the priest Francisco Margallo strongly attacked him from the pulpit, accusing his teaching of promoting heresy. Azuero responded with a vigorous formal complaint before the Executive Power, demanding sanctions against Margallo for insubordination; the government ruled in his favor and the priest was sent to serve penance in a convent.

=== Journalism and political enmities ===
Azuero requested a leave of absence and formally resigned from the High Court in 1827 to dedicate himself to political journalism. He founded and contributed to several publications, including Los Pensamientos, La Bandera Tricolor, El Observador Colombiano, and El Conductor, the latter of which was founded in February 1827. Its motto declared: "Peoples must be led by the authority of the laws, always equal and impassible, and not by passing wills, exposed to all passions."

Azuero cultivated deep enmities throughout his career. He was a fierce opponent of Antonio Nariño and his early federalist projects, to the point that historians and contemporaries held him responsible, along with Francisco Soto and Santander, for politically cornering the founding father until his death.

Later, he tenaciously opposed the extraordinary powers of Simón Bolívar, branding him a "tyrant" and "despot" in the press. Prior to the September Conspiracy of 1828, Azuero fled to Socorro fearing reprisals. After the attack, he was arrested. From prison, he directed letters to the Liberator and his ministers in which he condemned the conspiracy, proclaimed his innocence, and assured them of his intention to retire permanently to rural life.

=== Republic of New Granada ===
After Gran Colombia dissolved, Azuero returned as one of the main architects of the federalist party and an essential collaborator in Santander's government.

In the 1837 presidential elections, he ran as a candidate for the doctrinaire federalists. However, he did not have Santander's backing, as Azuero flatly refused to support the alternative candidacy of General José María Obando, whom he accused of being involved in the assassination of Marshal Antonio José de Sucre.

In the 1841 elections, he ran again for the federalist party (already identified as liberal) amid the violent War of the Supremes. Representing the opposition, he was persecuted and imprisoned by the government; despite this, he won a simple majority of the votes, although he did not achieve the presidency.

=== Death ===
After General Pedro Alcántara Herrán assumed the presidency, Azuero was granted amnesty and retired permanently from public life. He died on September 28, 1844, in La Mesa.

== Legacy ==
When his disciple Ezequiel Rojas proposed the first program for the Colombian Liberal Party in 1848 (considered the founding act of the party), he signed the document under the pseudonym "Azuero", honoring his mentor who had passed away four years earlier. He and his brother Juan Nepomuceno are regarded as two of the leading exponents of liberalism and anticlericalism in Colombia in the first half of the 19th century.

== Tributes ==
During the 19th century, when Panama was an integral part of the Neogranadine territory, the largest peninsula on the isthmus was named the Azuero Peninsula at the behest of President Francisco de Paula Santander. This name is preserved to this day.

== Bibliography ==
- Ospina, Joaquín (1927). Diccionario biográfico y bibliográfico de Colombia. Vol. 1. Bogotá: Editorial Águila.

== See also ==
- Gazeta de Colombia
