= Nada personal (1996 TV series) =

Mexican telenovela

- Genre: Telenovela
- Created by: Alberto Barrera Tyszka
- Written by: Alberto Barrera Tyszka
- Screenplay by: Pedro Reygadas; Pedro Miguel
- Story by: Carlos Payán; Epigmenio Ibarra; Hernán Vera
- Directed by: Antonio Serrano
- Creative director: Ariel Blanco
- Starring: Ana Colchero; Rogelio Guerra; Lupita Ferrer; Demián Bichir; José Ángel Llamas; Guillermo Gil; Joaquín Garrido; Christianne Gout
- Music by: Armando Manzanero
- Opening theme: "Nada personal" by Armando Manzanero and Lisset
- Country of origin: Mexico
- Original language: Spanish
- No. of episodes: 195

Production
- Executive producer: Maika Bernard
- Producers: Carlos Payán; Epigmenio Ibarra; María Auxiliadora Barrios; Hernán Vera
- Editor: Jorge García
- Camera setup: Multi-camera
- Running time: 60 minutes
- Production companies: Argos Comunicación; TV Azteca

Original release
- Network: TV 7 TV 13
- Release: May 20, 1996 – June 6, 1997

Related
- Demasiado corazón; Nada personal (2017)

Nada personal (Nothing Personal) is a Mexican telenovela, which was broadcast in 1996. It was the first produced by Argos Comunicación for TV Azteca and began on May 20 of that year on TV 7, though in July it moved to TV 13. It was the production that put the network on the radar of the television audience in Mexico. It was the first telenovela of Ana Colchero after her leave from Televisa and the first telenovela that discussed political topics. She played the role of Camila but had to be replaced by Christianne Gout when Colchero had issues with the network. It was directed by Antonio Serrano, director of Teresa and the blockbuster film Sexo, pudor y lágrimas.

== Plot ==
Police chief Fernándo Gomez Miranda kills his friend, the well-respected lawyer and likely candidate for Attorney General, Raúl de Los Reyes and his youngest daughter of only thirteen in a vehicle ambush. Gomez' son, Luis Mario – a sad-eyed broadcast journalist of passionate conviction – arrives on the scene soon after with his camera and discovers a wounded survivor in the car; Camila, the eldest daughter of de Los Reyes.

Luis rushes her to the hospital, saving her life and thereby creating a bond between them that he cannot escape. Luis' half-brother, police detective Alfonso Carbajal, is assigned to the case. An old schoolmate of Camila's, Alfonso has long been in love with her and conflicts arise when all evidence points to Camila being involved in the drug trade. The two brothers find themselves caught between their professional duty that would require them to expose Camila and their desire to protect her.

Standing in their way is Fernando, who is busy fabricating evidence to sink Camila and at the same time taking a very personal interest in Raúl's widow, María Dolores. Each on his own, Alfonso and Luis Mario work to prove Camila's innocence and find the real killer, without knowing that the man they seek is their own father.

The series is based on the life of the former Mexican President (1988–1994) Carlos Salinas de Gortari and his scandalous family story.

== Main cast ==
- José Ángel Llamas as Luis Mario Gómez
- Ana Colchero as Camila de los Reyes (1996–97)
- Christianne Gout as Camila de los Reyes (1997)
- Anna Ciocchetti as Elsa Grajales
- Rogelio Guerra as Comandante Fernando Gómez Miranda 'El Águila Real'
- Lupita Ferrer as María Dolores de los Reyes
- Demián Bichir as Comandante Alfonso Carbajal
- Guillermo Gil as Mateo
- Joaquín Garrido as X
- Vanessa Acosta as Paula
- Martín Altomaro as Próspero a.k.a. "Pop"
- Mónica Dionne as Alicia
- Enoc Leaño as "Mandíbulas"
- Claudia Lobo as Alma
- Pilar Ixquic Mata as Rosalba
- Víctor Huggo Martin as Víctor/Hugo
- Loló Navarro as Xóchitl
- María Renée Prudencio as Soraya
- Gloria Peralta as Monica
- Martha Resnikoff as Ester
- Josefo Rodríguez as Esteban
- José Sefami as Marrana
- Lourdes Villareal as Benigna
- Dunia Zaldívar as Amalia
- Claudio Obregón as Raúl de los Reyes
- Gilberto Perez Gallardo as Lucio

== Supporting cast ==
- Carlos Aragón
- Gustavo Arenas
- Arquímides Bernal
- Lorena Caballero
- Patricia Collazo
- Ramón Cue
- Aline Cuevas
- Rodrigo Du Rocher
- Jaime Escageda
- Claudia Frías
- Camerino García
- Alberto Gutiérrez
- Erika de la Llave
- Víctor Manuel Luna
- Mary Paz Mata
- María Elena Olivares
- Ramón Omanana
- Rubén Oviedo
- Leticia Pedrajo
- Agustín Pineda
- Valentina Ponzanneli
- Javier Rives
- Rosa María Salvador
- Laura Sosa
- Adalberto Tellez
- Daniel Valadez
- Simone Victoria
- Daniela Zamorano
- Armando de la Vega

== Ratings ==
Timeslot	# Ep.	Premiere		Finale		Season
Timeslot	# Ep.	Date	Premiere Rating	Date	Finale Rating	Season
Mondays—Friday; 10:00pm	120	20 May 1996	16	6 June 1997	29	1996–97
