= Manuel del Socorro Rodríguez =

Cuban journalist

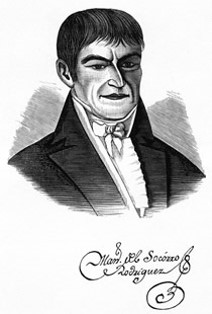
- Portrait of Manuel del Socorro Rodríguez
- Born: Manuel del Socorro Rodríguez de la Victoria; April 3, 1758; Bayamo, Captaincy General of Cuba, Spanish Empire
- Died: June 2, 1819 (aged 61); Bogotá, Viceroyalty of New Granada
- Occupations: Librarian, carpenter, journalist
- Relatives: Manuel Baltasar Rodríguez (father); María Antonia de la Victoria (mother)
- Writing career
- Language: Spanish
- Subject: Journalism
- Notable works: El Semanario (1791); Papel Periódico de la Ciudad de Santafé de Bogotá (1791); El Redactor Americano (1806); El Alternativo del Redactor Americano (1807); La Constitución Feliz (1810)

Signature
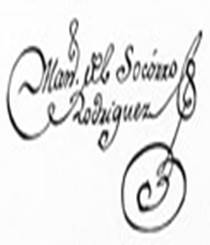

Manuel del Socorro Rodríguez (Bayamo, Captaincy General of Cuba, April 3, 1758 - Bogotá, Viceroyalty of New Granada, June 2, 1819) was a Cuban journalist. He is considered to be the founder of journalism in Colombia. Five years before his arrival in the Viceroyalty of New Granada, the 1785 Viceroyalty of New Granada earthquake had happened, described in the Aviso del Terremoto and published the day of the earthquake. This sparked the birth of journalism in Colombia, when Del Socorro started to report in 1791.

== Biography ==
Manuel del Socorro Rodríguez was born in Bayamo, Cuba with parents Manuel Baltasar Rodríguez and María Antonia de la Victoria. Approximately in June 1790, he left the Caribbean island for Cartagena in the Viceroyalty of New Granada, present-day Colombia. Del Socorro embarked on a boat sailing the Magdalena River and reached Honda, Tolima. From there, he went to Bogotá.

In 1791, Del Socorro started publishing El Semanario. After this initial newspaper, he published Papel Periódico de la Ciudad de Santafé de Bogotá in the same year, El Redactor Americano in 1806 and El Alternativo del Redactor Americano in 1807. Reporting about the Colombian independence movement from Spain, he published La Constitución Feliz in 1810.

Del Socorro Rodríguez died in the capital on June 3, 1819, before the actual independence was established.
