= Germán Castro Caycedo =

Colombian writer (1940–2021)

Germán Castro Caycedo (3 March 1940 – 15 July 2021) was a Colombian journalist and writer. Castro Caycedo's topics revolve around Colombian reality, under the parameters of cultural identity and its social and economic phenomena.

Born in Zipaquirá, Colombia, he graduated from Gimnasio Germán Peña. After studying anthropology for 3 years at the Universidad Nacional, he worked at El Tiempo newspaper from 1967 to 1977 as a general columnist. After leaving, he directed the "Enviado Especial" (special correspondent) TV show, which introduced the modern journalism in Colombia, for about 20 years.

His work has been published in Spain, France, Hungary, Japan, China and Greece.

== Books ==
Very brief descriptions of his books are as follows:

=== La Bruja (The Witch) ===
On the one hand the story of a gypsy witch, and on the other the life of a poor-well-known Colombian drug lord, Castro Caycedo uses their stories as a base to conduct the reader on a trip showing how the cocaine traffic affected the society and economy of a small town (Fredonia, Antioquia), the Mexican Secret Police's brutality and corruption, and the United States' active role in the birth and expansion of drug production in Colombia.

=== El Alcaraván ===
The stories of some pilots in the Colombian Orinoco region, where brave men face extreme jungle conditions, flying old DC-3 airplanes to carry people, food, medical supplies, and sometimes funny payloads, like beer or animals. "One of the most beautiful tales about Colombia", according to local critics.

=== Candelaria ===
A love story, partly written in Russia and partly in Colombia, set by the illegal drug trade.

=== Colombia amarga (Bitter Colombia) ===
Castro Caycedo's stories, collected on his travels across the country, about Colombian teenagers between 18 and 25 years old.

=== Con las manos en alto (With the Hands Up) ===
War episodes on Colombia.

=== El cachalandrán amarillo (The Yellow Cachalandrán) ===
A recompilation of Colombian popular stories.

=== El hueco (The Hole) ===
This book relates the Colombian citizens' mass emigration to the United States, passing through Mexico.

=== El hurakán (The Hurricane) ===
Simultaneous chronicles of conquistadores crossing the Atlantic, with slaves below decks and the jungle traps they faced, and a modern-day Colombian Navy sailing the seas, contemplating the differences in our historical evolution.

=== El Karina ===
The Karina was a craft sunk by a Colombian Navy ship on the Pacific Ocean. It was loaded with weapons for the M-19 guerrilla group.

=== Hágase tu voluntad (Thy Will Be Done) ===
Story about a Spanish archbishop and a Colombian nun, murdered by Ecuadorian Indians. The intent of the book is to show the Indians' opinion about white people, who throughout time have been wild invaders.

=== La muerte de Giacomo Turra (Giacomo Turra's Death) ===
An Italian citizen visits Cartagena, where he dies for causes never truly clarified.

=== Mi alma se la dejo al diablo (I Leave my Soul to the Devil) ===
A man's diary is found in the jungle, in which he wrote how he was dying. The title of the book is, precisely, the last words said man wrote in his diary.

=== Perdido en el Amazonas (Lost in Amazonas) ===
This story is another set in a jungle.

== Other books ==
- Más allá de la noche (Beyond the Night).
- Sin tregua (Without truce)

== Sources ==
- Editorial Planeta Catalog
- https://www.eltiempo.com/cultura/musica-y-libros/german-castro-caycedo-murio-el-escritor-y-periodista-603530
