= Rosario Tijeras (film) =

- Theatrical release poster
- Directed by: Emilio Maillé
- Screenplay by: Marcelo Figueras
- Based on: Rosario Tijeras (novel) by Jorge Franco Ramos
- Produced by: Matthias Ehrenberg
- Starring: Flora Martínez; Unax Ugalde; Manolo Cardona
- Cinematography: Pascal Marti
- Edited by: Irene Blecua
- Music by: Roque Baños
- Production companies: Río Negro Producciones; United Angels Productions; Tafay 2000; Maestranza Films; Dulce Compañía; Moonshot Pictures; La Femme Endormie
- Distributed by: Columbia TriStar
- Release date: 12 August 2005
- Running time: 126 minutes
- Countries: Mexico; Spain; Colombia; Brazil; France
- Language: Spanish

Rosario Tijeras is a 2005 film directed by Emilio Maillé and written by Marcelo Figueras based on the book of the same name by Jorge Franco. It stars Flora Martínez as the title character alongside Unax Ugalde and Manolo Cardona. It is a co-production among companies from Mexico, Spain, Colombia, Brazil, and France.

It is reportedly the second highest-grossing film in Colombian history.

== Plot ==
The movie, based on a novel by Jorge Franco, deals with the life of a beautiful woman involved with the subculture of sicarios, the motorcycle-riding hitmen of the slums of Medellín, Colombia, in the late 1980s and early 1990s. Rosario, a dangerous woman who was molested and raped as a child, and now claiming to be owned by no man, lives a life on the edge while trying to come to terms with her past and the men in her life, not making the best choices along the way.

The film is told in flashbacks from the point of view of Antonio, a young man from the upper class of Medellín. While at a Medellín disco one night, both he and his best friend, Emilio, simultaneously lay eyes upon the beautiful Rosario. Emilio pursues her and begins an affair with her, despite knowing that she is involved with drug cartel leaders, and despite getting entangled in her violent life. However, Emilio's family rejects the relationship, which crushes Emilio. Antonio continues his own platonic relationship with Rosario as her confidante. When Rosario's brother, Johnefe, with whom Rosario lives, is killed, Antonio and Rosario grow closer. All along, Rosario starts falling in a spiral of drugs and violence, dragging both Emilio and Antonio with her. Rosario, who often kisses the men she then kills, is a marked woman, and eventually meets her comeuppance. Antonio takes her to the emergency room, from where he relates her story.

== Cast ==
- Flora Martínez as Rosario Tijeras
- Manolo Cardona as Emilio
- Unax Ugalde as Antonio
- Rodrigo Oviedo as Johnefe
- Alonso Arias as Ferney
- Alejandra Borrero as Doña Rubí
- Kristina Lilley as Emilio's mom
- Alex Cox as Donovan
- Catalina Aristizábal as Greta
- Carlos Andrés Cadavid as Pato
- Héctor David Gómez as Maní
- Juan David Restrepo as Morsa
- Fernando Velázquez as Otálora

== Release ==
The film was released in Colombia in the Summer of 2005, becoming a box office hit and earning cult status. In that same year the film had its North American premiere at the American Film Institute festival in Hollywood.

It was theatrically released in Spain on 26 May 2006.

== Accolades ==
Year	Award	Category	Nominee(s)	Result	Ref.
2006	20th Goya Awards	Best Spanish-language Foreign Film		Nominated	
2006	9th Málaga Film Festival	Best Actress ('Territorio Latinoamericano' section)	Flora Martínez	Won	

== TV series ==
RCN produced a TV series that is currently being shown on its network in Colombia. Telefutura broadcast the series in the United States from July 12, 2010 to October 4, 2010 after replacing Las muñecas de la mafia. María Fernanda Yépez, a Colombian actress, stars as Rosario Tijeras in the TV series. Currently, Telefutura's successor, Unimás, is rebroadcasting the novela in place of the recently cancelled ¿Quién Eres Tú?.

The TV series tells the story of Rosario Tijeras (Maria Fernanda Yepez), a woman raised in a slum that was 18 years old when she was raped by a local gang, and which causes her to change for the better after her classmate was killed by a drug lord, El Papa. Rosario avenges her rape by cutting El Cache's testes with scissors (hence the name, Rosario Tijerias) and purposely goes to the market of her stepfather to get picked up to go to El Papa's house so she can execute her plan. Once Rosario is alone in his bedroom, she grabs a gun he hid in a cabinet and kills him behind a pillow. After news spreads she killed El Papa, Rosario Tijeras gains notoriety and is sought out by El Rey De Los Cielos (The King of the Heavens) to become an assassin. Along the way, she has a stormy love affair with her two inseparable friends from wealthy families, Antonio de Bedout (Andres Sandoval) and Emilio Echegaray (Sebastián Martínez).

The story takes a five-year jump from 1999 to 2004, where Rosario meets Emilio at a nightclub after she killed a target. Antonio notices her for the first time in five years and seeks to be with her once again. Their lives are separated by Rosario, which traps them and takes them to a world full of dangers, where she is a victim and instrument of death and they receive a deadly fate thanks in part to a woman they loved before Rosario, Paula Restrepo, who seeks to destroy Rosario for ruining her love life and at the end she is left without her best friend and husband. Rosario pays the ultimate price when she kills the brother of El Rey, El Teo, who killed her brother (Jhonefe), her close friend (Ferney) who tried to kill her by Teo's orders, her unborn baby in a shootout, and Emilio at the cemetery. Rosario and Antonio plan their escape to Spain but are stopped short by El Rey's men who fulfill his orders and kill both. The series ends with Rosario having a makeshift memorial made near her old home where she lived.

== Music ==
- Juanes, song included in the soundtrack Rosario Tijeras

=== TV series soundtrack ===
Track listing
No.	Title	Artist	Length
1.	"Si vos no estas aquí"	El Vampiro
2.	"Rosario"	Mary Hellen, Wolfine, Q´sko
3.	"Amor a la fuerza"	Ultrajala, Q´sko, Kiño
4.	"Soy fuego"	Mugre T.O, Goez T.O, Mary Hellen
5.	"Soy fuego"	Mugre T.O, Goez T.O, Mary Hellen
6.	"El barrio"	Wolfine, Pipe Bega, Goez T.O, Mary Hellen
7.	"Triste y vacia"	Goez T.O, Kiño
8.	"El que a hierro mata"	I'll Wonder, Alias Ramírez, Ultrajala
9.	"Bang-Bang"	T.O, Mary Hellen, Wolfine
10.	"Sed de venganza"	Tribu Omerta, Kiño
11.	"Maldita Mujer"	Tito – Fatto (Caña. Brava), El Amarillo
12.	"El rey de los cielos"	Q´sko, Oso, Ebratt, Felpa
13.	"Así somos"	Q´sko, Pipe Bega, Laberinto, DJH

== See also ==
- Movies depicting Colombia
- List of Colombian films
- List of Spanish films of 2006
