= Soy Luna en Concierto =

2017 concert tour

- Tour by Soy Luna
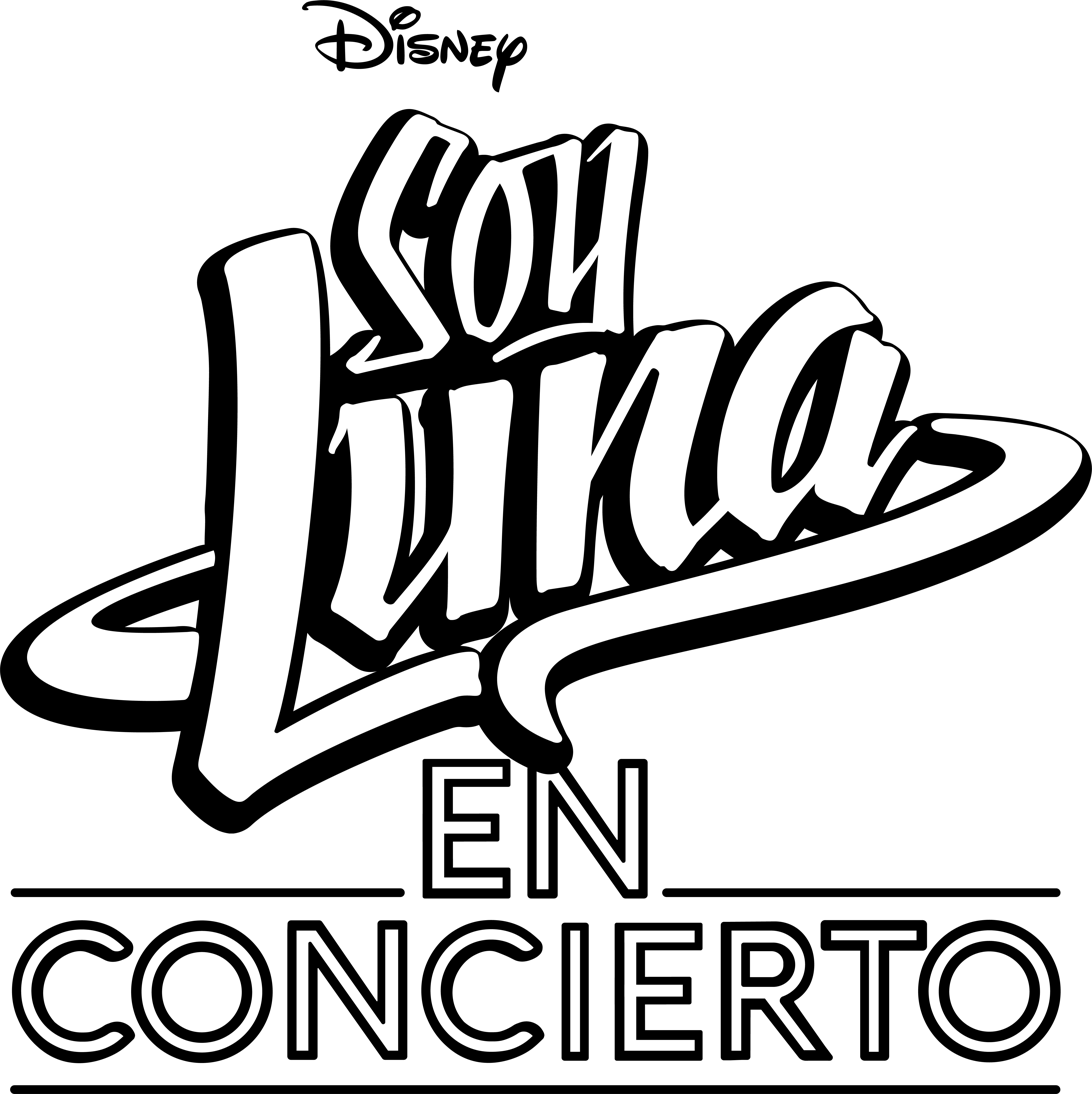
- Location: Latin America
- Associated album: Soy Luna; Música en ti La vida es un sueño
- Start date: 24 March 2017
- End date: 30 September 2017
- Legs: 1
- No. of shows: 44
- Attendance: 450,000

Soy Luna concert chronology
- Soy Luna en Concierto (2017); Soy Luna Live (2018)

Soy Luna en Concierto was the first concert tour by the cast of the Argentina Disney Channel television series Soy Luna, in support of the soundtracks Soy Luna (2016), Música en ti (2016) and La vida es un sueño (2017). The tour began on 24 March 2017 in Buenos Aires at Tecnopolis Arena and travelled 20 cities across 11 countries to finally conclude on 30 September 2017 in São Paulo at Citibank Hall.

On December 10, 2017, a film featuring the concerts in Mexico City was broadcast on Disney Channel under the title "Soy Luna: En Concierto - México"

== Background ==
The tour was confirmed by Karol Sevilla at Susana Giménez on 25 September 2016. The Buenos Aires concerts were announced first, with two additional shows added due to demand, followed by an extension across Latin America that was originally scheduled to end in May 2017 in Guayaquil. The tour was a commercial success, with numerous shows selling out, prompting additional dates in cities including Córdoba, Santiago, Mexico City, Monterrey and Sao Paulo. The tour schedule was so demanding that the cast even had to fly by private plane on several occasions. On 12 June 2017, it was confirmed that the tour would perform for the first time in Brazil on 30 September 2017, this being the last date of the tour.

== Cast ==
- Karol Sevilla as Luna Valente
- Ruggero Pasquarelli as Matteo Balsano
- Valentina Zenere as Ámbar Smith
- Michael Ronda as Simón Álvarez
- Malena Ratner as Delfina "Delfi" Alzamendi
- Agustín Bernasconi as Gastón Perida
- Katja Martínez as Jazmín Carbajal
- Ana Jara Martínez as Jimena "Jim" Medina
- Jorge López as Ramiro Ponce
- Chiara Parravicini as Yamila "Yam" Sánchez
- Gastón Vietto as Pedro Arias
- Carolina Kopelioff as Nina Simonetti
- Sebastián Villalobos joined the cast for the concerts in Colombia and Mexico

== Set list ==
1. "Intro"
2. "Alas"
3. "Siempre Juntos"
4. "Prófugos"
5. "La Vida es un Sueño"
6. "Invisibles"
7. "Sobre ruedas"
8. "Siento"
9. "Mírame a mí"
10. "Eres"
11. "Chicas así"
12. "Valiente (acoustic)"
13. "Linda"
14. "Música en ti"
15. "I'd Be Crazy"
16. "A rodar mi vida"
17. "Fush, ¡Te Vas!"
18. "Tengo Un Corazón"
19. "Mitad y Mitad"
20. "Qué más da"
21. "Aquí Estoy"
22. "Yo Quisiera"
23. "Un destino"
24. "Valiente"
25. "Vuelo"
26. "Alas"
27. "Siempre Juntos"

== Shows ==
List of concerts, showing date, city, country, venue, tickets sold, number of available tickets, gross revenue and number of shows
Date (2017)	City	Country	Venue	Number of shows	Attendance	Revenue
24 March	Buenos Aires	Argentina	Tecnopolis Arena	2	—N/a	—N/a
25 March	Buenos Aires	Argentina	Tecnopolis Arena	2	—N/a	—N/a
26 March	Buenos Aires	Argentina	Tecnopolis Arena	2	—N/a	—N/a
28 March	Buenos Aires	Argentina	Tecnopolis Arena	1	—N/a	—N/a
29 March	Buenos Aires	Argentina	Tecnopolis Arena	1	—N/a	—N/a
31 March	Córdoba	Argentina	Orfeo Superdomo	2	—N/a	—N/a
1 April	Córdoba	Argentina	Orfeo Superdomo	2	—N/a	—N/a
3 April	Asunción	Paraguay	Jockey Club	1	—N/a	—N/a
5 April	Salta	Argentina	Estadio Padre Ernesto Martearena	1	—N/a	—N/a
7 April	Santiago	Chile	Movistar Arena	2	—N/a	—N/a
8 April	Santiago	Chile	Movistar Arena	2	—N/a	—N/a
9 April	Santiago	Chile	Movistar Arena	2	—N/a	—N/a
11 April	Tucumán	Argentina	Estadio La Ciudadela	1	—N/a	—N/a
13 April	Montevideo	Uruguay	Estadio Centenario	1	—N/a	—N/a
15 April	Rosario	Argentina	Parque de la Independencia	2	—N/a	—N/a
18 April	Lima	Peru	Jockey Club del Perú	1	—N/a	—N/a
20 April	Medellín	Colombia	Plaza de Toros La Macarena	1	—N/a	—N/a
22 April	Bogotá	Colombia	Centro de Eventos Autopista Norte	2	—N/a	—N/a
23 April	Cali	Colombia	Plaza de Toros Cañaveralejo	1	—N/a	—N/a
25 April	Barranquilla	Colombia	Colegio San José	1	—N/a	—N/a
29 April	Mexico City	Mexico	Auditorio Nacional	2	76,486 / 76,936	$3,411,301
30 April	Mexico City	Mexico	Auditorio Nacional	2	76,486 / 76,936	$3,411,301
1 May	Mexico City	Mexico	Auditorio Nacional	2	76,486 / 76,936	$3,411,301
3 May	Monterrey	Mexico	Auditorio Citibanamex	1	13,273 / 13,308	$794,259
4 May	Monterrey	Mexico	Auditorio Citibanamex	1	13,273 / 13,308	$794,259
7 May	San José	Costa Rica	Estadio Nacional de Costa Rica	1	—N/a	—N/a
9 May	Panama City	Panama	Figali Convention Center	1	—N/a	—N/a
11 May	Quito	Ecuador	Estadio Olímpico Atahualpa	1	—N/a	—N/a
13 May	Guayaquil	Ecuador	Estadio Alberto Spencer	1	—N/a	—N/a
30 September	São Paulo	Brazil	Citibank Hall	2	7,420 / 8,340	$622,799
Total					97,179 / 98,584 (98.6%)	$4,828,359
