= Soy Luna Live =

2018 concert tour

- Tour by Soy Luna
- Location: Europe
- Associated album: Soy Luna; Música en ti La vida es un sueño
- Start date: 5 January 2018
- End date: 9 April 2018
- Legs: 1
- No. of shows: 49
- Attendance: 273,634 (Note: According to Pollstar reports.)
- Box office: $19.5 millions (Note: According to Pollstar reports.)

Soy Luna concert chronology
- Soy Luna en Concierto (2017); Soy Luna Live (2018); Soy Luna en Vivo (2018)

Soy Luna Live was the second concert tour by the cast of the Argentina Disney Channel television series Soy Luna, in support of the soundtracks Soy Luna (2016), Música en ti (2016) and La vida es un sueño (2017). The tour began on 5 January 2018 in Barcelona at Palau Sant Jordi and concluded on 9 April 2018 in Brussels at Palais 12.

== Background ==
This tour was confirmed towards the end of May 2017, as an extension of Soy Luna en Concierto. This second tour commenced at the beginning of 2018 in Barcelona, and had 49 shows in 37 European cities. Due to high demand, extra shows were added in Madrid, Málaga, Seville, Lisbon, Munich, Oberhausen and Vienna. On 13 February 2018, a first date was announced in Ljubljana for 3 April, followed by the announcement on 5 March 2018 of an "extra show" scheduled for 4 April. The tour concluded in April in Brussels.

== Cast ==
- Karol Sevilla as Luna Valente
- Ruggero Pasquarelli as Matteo Balsano
- Valentina Zenere as Ámbar Smith
- Michael Ronda as Simón Álvarez
- Malena Ratner as Delfina "Delfi" Alzamendi
- Ana Jara Martínez as Jimena "Jim" Medina
- Jorge López as Ramiro Ponce
- Chiara Parravicini as Yamila "Yam" Sánchez
- Gastón Vietto as Pedro Arias

== Set list ==
1. "Intro"
2. "Alas"
3. "Siempre Juntos"
4. "Prófugos"
5. "La Vida es un Sueño"
6. "Invisibles"
7. "Sobre ruedas"
8. "Siento"
9. "Mírame a mí"
10. "Eres"
11. "Chicas así"
12. "Valiente (acoustic)"
13. "Linda"
14. "Música en ti"
15. "I'd Be Crazy"
16. "A rodar mi vida"
17. "Solo Para Ti"
18. "Catch Me If You Can"
19. "Qué más da"
20. "Allá Voy"
21. "Yo Quisiera"
22. "Un destino"
23. "Valiente"
24. "Vuelo"
25. "Alas"
26. "Siempre Juntos"

Notes

- At the second Malaga show, "Valiente", "Vuelo" and "Siempre Juntos" were not performed at the end of the concert.
- In Italy, "Alas" at the beginning of the show was performed in Italian as "Tutto è possibile".

== Shows ==
List of concerts, showing date, city, country, venue, tickets sold, number of available tickets, gross revenue and number of shows
Date (2018)	City	Country	Venue	Number of shows	Attendance	Revenue
5 January	Barcelona	Spain	Palau Sant Jordi	1	—N/a	—N/a
7 January	Madrid	Spain	WiZink Center	2	—N/a	—N/a
9 January	Bilbao	Spain	Bizkaia Arena	1	—N/a	—N/a
11 January	Zaragoza	Spain	Pabellón Príncipe Felipe	1	—N/a	—N/a
13 January	Málaga	Spain	Palacio Jose Maria Martin Carpena	1	—N/a	—N/a
14 January	Málaga	Spain	Palacio Jose Maria Martin Carpena	1	—N/a	—N/a
17 January	Seville	Spain	Palacio Municipal San Pablo	1	—N/a	—N/a
18 January	Seville	Spain	Palacio Municipal San Pablo	1	—N/a	—N/a
20 January	Lisbon	Portugal	Altice Arena	2	—N/a	—N/a
21 January	Lisbon	Portugal	Altice Arena	1	—N/a	—N/a
24 January	Turin	Italy	Pala Alpitour	1	—N/a	—N/a
27 January	Rome	Italy	PalaLottomatica	1	—N/a	—N/a
28 January	Rome	Italy	PalaLottomatica	1	—N/a	—N/a
30 January	Naples	Italy	PalaPartenope	2	—N/a	—N/a
31 January	Florence	Italy	Nelson Mandela Forum	1	—N/a	—N/a
2 February	Milan	Italy	Mediolanum Forum	1	13,086 (Note: According to Pollstar reports.)	$889,000 (Note: According to Pollstar reports.)
3 February	Milan	Italy	Mediolanum Forum	1	13,086	$889,000
6 February	Padua	Italy	Kioene Arena	1	—N/a	—N/a
9 February	Bologna	Italy	Unipol Arena	1	—N/a	—N/a
14 February	Lyon	France	Halle Tony Garnier	1	—N/a	—N/a
15 February	Geneva	Switzerland	SEG Geneva Arena	1	—N/a	—N/a
17 February	Bordeaux	France	Métropole Aréna	1	—N/a	—N/a
18 February	Toulouse	France	Zénith de Toulouse	1	—N/a	—N/a
20 February	Nice	France	Palais Nikaïa	1	—N/a	—N/a
21 February	Marseille	France	Le Dôme de Marseille	1	—N/a	—N/a
24 February	Paris	France	Zénith Paris	1	9,726 (Note: According to Pollstar reports.)	$846,204 (Note: According to Pollstar reports.)
25 February	Paris	France	Zénith Paris	1	9,726	$846,204
28 February	Lille	France	Zénith de Lille	1	—N/a	—N/a
2 March	Nantes	France	Zénith de Nantes	1	—N/a	—N/a
4 March	Montpellier	France	Zénith Sud	1	—N/a	—N/a
15 March	Hamburg	Germany	Barclaycard Arena	1	7,392 / 10,619	$557,001
17 March	Mannheim	Germany	SAP Arena	1	—N/a	—N/a
18 March	Zürich	Switzerland	Hallenstadion	1	4,972 / 9,340	$552,429
22 March	Berlin	Germany	Mercedes-Benz Arena	1	7,760 / 11,185	$549,067
24 March	Cologne	Germany	Lanxess Arena	1	—N/a	—N/a
25 March	Munich	Germany	Olympiahalle	1	—N/a	—N/a
29 March	Stuttgart	Germany	Hanns-Martin-Schleyer-Halle	1	—N/a	—N/a
31 March	Oberhausen	Germany	König Pilsener Arena	2	—N/a	—N/a
1 April	Frankfurt	Germany	Festhalle Frankfurt	1	—N/a	—N/a
3 April	Ljubljana	Slovenia	Arena Stožice	1	—N/a	—N/a
4 April	Ljubljana	Slovenia	Arena Stožice	1	—N/a	—N/a
5 April	Vienna	Austria	Wiener Stadthalle	1	—N/a	—N/a
6 April	Vienna	Austria	Wiener Stadthalle	1	—N/a	—N/a
8 April	Leipzig	Germany	Arena Leipzig	1	—N/a	—N/a
9 April	Brussels	Belgium	Palais 12	1	—N/a	—N/a
Total					20,124 / 31,144 (64.6%) (Note: According to Billbaord reports.)	$1,658,497 (Note: According to Billbaord reports.)

=== Canceled show ===
List of canceled concert
Date (2018)	City	Country	Venue	Number of shows	Reason
26 March	Munich	United States	Olympiahalle	1	Logistic and production issues
