= List of Soy Luna episodes =

Soy Luna is an Argentine telenovela produced by Disney Channel Latin America. Developed by Disney Channel Latin America and Europe, Middle East and Africa (EMEA), the series stars Karol Sevilla along with Ruggero Pasquarelli. The first season was confirmed to have 80 episodes.

On 13 May 2017, Disney Channel confirmed that the show had been renewed for a third season.

The series premiered on 14 March 2016 and concluded on 17 August 2018. During the course of the series, 220 episodes of Soy Luna aired over three seasons.

On 23 October 2024, Karol Sevilla confirmed that the series would return for a fourth season, which began filming in June 2025. The new season premiered on July 24, 2026 on Disney+ and was titled Soy Luna: Let’s Roll Again.

== Series overview ==
Series	Episodes		Originally released	
Series	Episodes		First released	Last released
1	80	40	14 March 2016	6 May 2016
1	80	40	4 July 2016	26 August 2016
2	80	40	17 April 2017	9 June 2017
2	80	40	7 August 2017	29 September 2017
3	60	30	16 April 2018	25 May 2018
3	60	30	9 July 2018	17 August 2018
4	12		24 July 2026	24 July 2026

== Episodes ==
=== Season 1 (2016) ===
No. overall	No. in season	Title	Original release date
Part 1
1	1	Un sueño, sobre ruedas	14 March 2016
2	2	Una nueva historia, sobre ruedas	15 March 2016
3	3	Nuevas aventuras, sobre ruedas	16 March 2016
4	4	Un secreto, sobre ruedas	17 March 2016
5	5	Un amor, sobre ruedas	18 March 2016
6	6	Una oportunidad, sobre ruedas	21 March 2016
7	7	Una verdad al descubierto, sobre ruedas	22 March 2016
8	8	Una decisión, sobre ruedas	23 March 2016
9	9	Un descubrimiento, sobre ruedas	24 March 2016
10	10	Una rival, sobre ruedas	25 March 2016
11	11	Una competencia, sobre ruedas	28 March 2016
12	12	Un misterio, sobre ruedas	29 March 2016
13	13	Un celoso, sobre ruedas	30 March 2016
14	14	Un "casi" beso, sobre ruedas	31 March 2016
15	15	Una duda, sobre ruedas	1 April 2016
16	16	Una mala nota, sobre ruedas	4 April 2016
17	17	Un intercambio de pruebas, sobre ruedas	5 April 2016
18	18	Una canción con Matteo, sobre ruedas	6 April 2016
19	19	Un casi beso con... ¿Simón?, sobre ruedas	7 April 2016
20	20	Un descubrimiento de Luna, sobre ruedas	8 April 2016
21	21	Una medallita, un secreto, sobre ruedas	11 April 2016
22	22	Un amor no correspondido, sobre ruedas	12 April 2016
23	23	Un amor por RollerTrack, sobre ruedas	13 April 2016
24	24	Una decisión ¿la competencia ó Simón?, sobre ruedas	14 April 2016
25	25	Una FelicityForNow mentirosa, sobre ruedas	15 April 2016
26	26	Canciones y confusiones en el Open Music, sobre ruedas	18 April 2016
27	27	Un nuevo hogar para Simón, sobre ruedas	19 April 2016
28	28	¿No se dio cuenta de qué te amo?, sobre ruedas	20 April 2016
29	29	Una confusión de sentimientos, sobre ruedas	21 April 2016
30	30	Segunda fase de la competencia, sobre ruedas	22 April 2016
31	31	Y la competencia continúa..., sobre ruedas	25 April 2016
32	32	Un celoso por Romeo y Julieta, sobre ruedas	26 April 2016
33	33	Una documentación perdida, sobre ruedas	27 April 2016
34	34	Un viaje, sobre ruedas	28 April 2016
35	35	¡La pista de mi sueño con Matteo!, sobre ruedas	29 April 2016
36	36	Una confusión de parejas, sobre ruedas	2 May 2016
37	37	El final de una relación, sobre ruedas	3 May 2016
38	38	¿Qué sientes por mi?, sobre ruedas	4 May 2016
39	39	Un doble cambio en la final, sobre ruedas	5 May 2016
40	40	Un beso, sobre ruedas	6 May 2016
Part 2
41	41	Sentimientos, sobre ruedas	4 July 2016
42	42	Una decisión muy apresurada, sobre ruedas	5 July 2016
43	43	Un secreto que guardar, sobre ruedas	6 July 2016
44	44	Una sorpresa, sobre ruedas	7 July 2016
45	45	Un Open Music random, sobre ruedas	8 July 2016
46	46	¿Un amor o una amistad?, sobre ruedas	11 July 2016
47	47	Un mal entendido, sobre ruedas	12 July 2016
48	48	Un despido, sobre ruedas	13 July 2016
49	49	Celos por Simón, sobre ruedas	14 July 2016
50	50	Encuentros, sobre ruedas	15 July 2016
51	51	¡Se besaban!, sobre ruedas	18 July 2016
52	52	Nuevos amores, sobre ruedas	19 July 2016
53	53	Un pendrive pérdido, sobre ruedas	20 July 2016
54	54	Un plan, sobre ruedas	21 July 2016
55	55	Lo que siento, sobre ruedas	22 July 2016
56	56	¿Matteo ó Simón?, sobre ruedas	25 July 2016
57	57	Una verdad casí revelada, sobre ruedas	26 July 2016
58	58	Una mentira, sobre ruedas	27 July 2016
59	59	Un "juego" de amor, sobre ruedas	28 July 2016
60	60	Confusión en la competencia, sobre ruedas	29 July 2016
61	61	Un nuevo amor, sobre ruedas	1 August 2016
62	62	Novios, sobre ruedas	2 August 2016
63	63	Confusiones en la mansión, sobre ruedas	3 August 2016
64	64	¿Quién es FelicityForNow?, sobre ruedas	4 August 2016
65	65	Open Music: chicos vs chicas, sobre ruedas	5 August 2016
66	66	Una propuesta, sobre ruedas	8 August 2016
67	67	¿Qué siento por Matteo?, sobre ruedas	9 August 2016
68	68	Una nueva formación del equipo, sobre ruedas	10 August 2016
69	69	¿Un novío o un amigo?, sobre ruedas	11 August 2016
70	70	¿Surge el amor?, sobre ruedas	12 August 2016
71	71	Una visita especial, sobre ruedas	15 August 2016
72	72	Un trabajo perdido, sobre ruedas	16 August 2016
73	73	Una fiesta de cumpleaños, sobre ruedas	17 August 2016
74	74	Miedo de enamorarse, sobre ruedas	18 August 2016
75	75	Un Open Music de revelaciones, sobre ruedas	19 August 2016
76	76	Yo soy FelicityForNow, sobre ruedas	22 August 2016
77	77	Una verdad que puede cambiarlo todo, sobre ruedas	23 August 2016
78	78	Una decisión amorosa, sobre ruedas	24 August 2016
79	79	La final de la InterContinental, sobre ruedas: Part 1	25 August 2016
80	80	La final de la InterContinental, sobre ruedas: Part 2	26 August 2016

=== Season 2 (2017) ===
No. overall	No. in season	Title	Original release date
Part 1
81	1	Episode 1	17 April 2017
82	2	Episode 2	18 April 2017
83	3	Episode 3	19 April 2017
84	4	Episode 4	20 April 2017
85	5	Episode 5	21 April 2017
86	6	Episode 6	24 April 2017
87	7	Episode 7	25 April 2017
88	8	Episode 8	26 April 2017
89	9	Episode 9	27 April 2017
90	10	Episode 10	28 April 2017
91	11	Episode 11	1 May 2017
92	12	Episode 12	2 May 2017
93	13	Episode 13	4 May 2017
94	14	Episode 14	4 May 2017
95	15	Episode 15	5 May 2017
96	16	Episode 16	8 May 2017
97	17	Episode 17	9 May 2017
98	18	Episode 18	10 May 2017
99	19	Episode 19	11 May 2017
100	20	Episode 20	12 May 2017
101	21	Episode 21	15 May 2017
102	22	Episode 22	16 May 2017
103	23	Episode 23	17 May 2017
104	24	Episode 24	18 May 2017
105	25	Episode 25	19 May 2017
106	26	Episode 26	22 May 2017
107	27	Episode 27	23 May 2017
108	28	Episode 28	24 May 2017
109	29	Episode 29	25 May 2017
110	30	Episode 30	26 May 2017
111	31	Episode 31	29 May 2017
112	32	Episode 32	30 May 2017
113	33	Episode 33	31 May 2017
114	34	Episode 34	1 June 2017
115	35	Episode 35	2 June 2017
116	36	Episode 36	5 June 2017
117	37	Episode 37	6 June 2017
118	38	Episode 38	7 June 2017
119	39	Episode 39	8 June 2017
120	40	Episode 40	9 June 2017
Part 2
121	41	Episode 41	7 August 2017
122	42	Episode 42	8 August 2017
123	43	Episode 43	9 August 2017
124	44	Episode 44	10 August 2017
125	45	Episode 45	11 August 2017
126	46	Episode 46	14 August 2017
127	47	Episode 47	15 August 2017
128	48	Episode 48	16 August 2017
129	49	Episode 49	17 August 2017
130	50	Episode 50	18 August 2017
131	51	Episode 51	21 August 2017
132	52	Episode 52	22 August 2017
133	53	Episode 53	23 August 2017
134	54	Episode 54	24 August 2017
135	55	Episode 55	25 August 2017
136	56	Episode 56	28 August 2017
137	57	Episode 57	29 August 2017
138	58	Episode 58	30 August 2017
139	59	Episode 59	31 August 2017
140	60	Episode 60	1 September 2017
141	61	Episode 61	4 September 2017
142	62	Episode 62	5 September 2017
143	63	Episode 63	6 September 2017
144	64	Episode 64	7 September 2017
145	65	Episode 65	8 September 2017
146	66	Episode 66	11 September 2017
147	67	Episode 67	12 September 2017
148	68	Episode 68	13 September 2017
Alfredo tries to open the safe but Sharon arrives before he manages to open it. The roller team keeps practicing. Gary sees Ambar skate and likes it. Simon boasts and Gary challenges him to roller skating duel. Miguel goes to the nursing home and manages to steal the box. Richard arrives back in Buenos Aires.
149	69	Episode 69	14 September 2017
Miguel brings Luna the box and she finds a note mentioning the moon pendant. Richard and Ana discuss Nina's proposal to study abroad. Simon, Nico and Pedro are sleeping at the Jam n' Roller. Luna asks Sharon about Roberto Muñoz. Ambar prepares for her date with Simon. Gaston talks to Richard and Ana and tells them how much the study abroad program means to Nina. Roberto and Elena plan to open Sharon's safe. Gary shows the kids that he can skate, but Simon beats him. Gary then lets them stay in the loft. Sharon tells Miguel and Monica that she wants them back in Cancun. Luna sees the drawing that Tino & Cato found. Gary tells Juliana that he's now a partner in VIDIA.
150	70	Episode 70	15 September 2017
Luna dreams about her mom again. Luna sees the drawing that her mother made, and remembers it from her dreams. The girls band rehearses. Alfredo finds out that Ambar is not Sol.
151	71	Episode 71	18 September 2017
Simon and Ambar are kissing. Sharon almost catches Luna, Alfredo and Elena in cahoots. Alfredo is very upset that Sharon lied to him. Nina tries to decide between the study abroad and the roller program and talks to Richard about it. Alfredo asks the Valentes and Amanda for help. Tino and Cato are fired. Luna tells Simon about Ambar and going back to Cancun. Jazmin overhears Ambar and Simon make a second date. Simon tells Jazmin she's a great person, but he's not interested. She tells him to be careful with Ambar. While at Ambar's, Simon finds the scarf that is seen on the video when the fire started.
152	72	Episode 72	19 September 2017
Simon leaves Ambar's house without saying anything, then avoids Ambar on the phone. Gary is still set on having the roller team be the Red Sharks, and even gets them t-shirts. The kids refuse to wear them.
153	73	Episode 73	20 September 2017
Simón confronts Ambar about the scarf. Amanda tells Alfredo that Ambar knew the truth about Sol. Nina tells Gastón she is staying. Ambar tells Simón and Juliana that the fire was an accident, but denies breaking the glass skate. Juliana kicks her off the team. Alfredo offers Miguel and Monica a job at his home. Juliana calls Sharon and tells her that Ambar was responsible for the fire. Sharon tells Ambar she will not be going to Paris in punishment. Ramiro and Yaz tiptoe about their feelings. Alfredo confronts Sharon about her lies.
154	74	Episode 74	21 September 2017
Mateo continues moping over the lost record deal. He does not care about the skating competition. Sharon is spying on Rey. Ambar tries to join the Sliders. Pedro cannot believe that Delfi knew about Ambar's doings. Sharon tells Rey that Alfredo knows about the blackmail. Luna takes Mateo's moping very hard. Nina is moping about Gaston's leaving. Sharon makes a proposal to Miguel and Monica. Luna asks Alfredo if he knows how to contact Tino and Cato. When Luna mentions Roberto Muñoz, Alfredo has a flashback. Juliana confronts Mateo, who is still moping. She gives him an ultimatum. Ambar apologizes to Luna about the roller rink, while plotting her revenge.
155	75	Episode 75	22 September 2017
Luna sleepwalks dreaming of the fire in the mansion. Sharon finds her huddled in a corner and tries to convince her is due to stress over the exams and roller jam. Mateo talks to his dad and they come to an agreement. At the roller rink, Ambar manages to videotape part of the practice, which she then shares with the Sliders. Ambar decides to leave for Cancún right away.
156	76	Episode 76	25 September 2017
Alfredo figures out that Luna is Sol, but Sharon manages to get him locked up in asylum. Juliana decides to take all the kids to Mexico. Rey tells Sharon he's loved her for a long time. Ramiro and the others put pressure on Simon to write a new song for the roller jam. Sharon tells Rey she knows he's the blackmailer. Mateo apologizes to Gaston. Luna has the fire nightmare again while at Nina's house. Mora tries some word association game, and Luna calls out Sol, but Mora thinks it has to do with the fire. Ambar, Miguel and Monica arrive in Cancun. Luna manages to cheer up Simon. Luna and Mateo practice together. Emilia from the Sliders team is having a tweeting war with Jazmin. Jazmin sends her a clip of the team rehearsing to "show her how good they are." Of course, she gives away their secret dance number which they copy. Juliana comes up with a different routine. Alfredo tries to borrow a phone from another patient. He reaches Miguel, but then the nurse takes away the phone.
157	77	Episode 77	26 September 2017
Sharon has a flashback to the day of the fire, when she had an argument with Lily. They fought, which caused the fire. Sharon is found by Amanda in the kitchen in a bathrobe and unkempt. Luna and Mateo bicker while practicing. In Cancun, Ambar skates with the Sliders team. Juliana switches Mateo for Simon as Luna's skating partner. Jazmin records the new routine secretly. Monica and Miguel find a note in a book that shows that Sharon was in love with Bernie. Ambar overhears them. Sharon goes into Luna's room, where Amanda finds her. Jim is anxious, but Nico helps calm her down. Jazmin sends the second video. Luna can't find her necklace again. She goes to the mansion to look for it, where she runs into Sharon sitting in the dark.
158	78	Episode 78	27 September 2017
Sharon tries to find out how much Luna knows about her past. Luckily, Amanda walks in just as Sharon is getting really scary. Alfredo manages to get another phone, but Ambar answers the phone and she hangs up on him. She takes the batteries out the phone so he cannot call again. Jazmin posts the video on the blog so the sliders cannot claim the routing is theirs. Tino and Cato sneak into the mansion, just as Mora and Ana arrive to look for the necklace. The kids leave for Cancun, and Sharon decides to leave also. Luna and Simon run into Ambar in Cancun. Rey shows up at the mansion and takes stuff from the safe.
159	79	Episode 79	28 September 2017
160	80	Episode 80	29 September 2017

=== Season 3 (2018) ===
No. overall	No. in season	Title	Original release date
Part 1
161	1	Episode 1	16 April 2018
162	2	Episode 2	17 April 2018
163	3	Episode 3	18 April 2018
164	4	Episode 4	19 April 2018
165	5	Episode 5	20 April 2018
166	6	Episode 6	23 April 2018
167	7	Episode 7	24 April 2018
168	8	Episode 8	25 April 2018
169	9	Episode 9	26 April 2018
170	10	Episode 10	27 April 2018
171	11	Episode 11	30 April 2018
172	12	Episode 12	1 May 2018
173	13	Episode 13	2 May 2018
174	14	Episode 14	3 May 2018
175	15	Episode 15	4 May 2018
176	16	Episode 16	7 May 2018
177	17	Episode 17	8 May 2018
178	18	Episode 18	9 May 2018
179	19	Episode 19	10 May 2018
180	20	Episode 20	11 May 2018
181	21	Episode 21	14 May 2018
182	22	Episode 22	15 May 2018
183	23	Episode 23	16 May 2018
184	24	Episode 24	17 May 2018
185	25	Episode 25	18 May 2018
186	26	Episode 26	21 May 2018
187	27	Episode 27	22 May 2018
188	28	Episode 28	23 May 2018
189	29	Episode 29	24 May 2018
190	30	Episode 30	25 May 2018
Part 2
191	31	Episode 31	9 July 2018
192	32	Episode 32	10 July 2018
193	33	Episode 33	11 July 2018
194	34	Episode 34	12 July 2018
195	35	Episode 35	13 July 2018
196	36	Episode 36	16 July 2018
197	37	Episode 37	17 July 2018
198	38	Episode 38	18 July 2018
199	39	Episode 39	19 July 2018
200	40	Episode 40	20 July 2018
201	41	Episode 41	23 July 2018
202	42	Episode 42	24 July 2018
203	43	Episode 43	25 July 2018
204	44	Episode 44	26 July 2018
205	45	Episode 45	27 July 2018
206	46	Episode 46	30 July 2018
207	47	Episode 47	31 July 2018
208	48	Episode 48	1 August 2018
209	49	Episode 49	2 August 2018
210	50	Episode 50	3 August 2018
211	51	Episode 51	6 August 2018
212	52	Episode 52	7 August 2018
213	53	Episode 53	8 August 2018
214	54	Episode 54	9 August 2018
215	55	Episode 55	10 August 2018
216	56	Episode 56	13 August 2018
217	57	Episode 57	14 August 2018
218	58	Episode 58	15 August 2018
219	59	Episode 59	16 August 2018
220	60	Episode 60	17 August 2018

=== Season 4 (2026) ===
No. overall	No. in season	Title	Original release date
Part 1
221	1	Episode 1	2026
222	2	Episode 2	2026
223	3	Episode 3	2026
224	4	Episode 4	2026
225	5	Episode 5	2026
226	6	Episode 6	2026
Part 2
227	7	Episode 7	2026
228	8	Episode 8	2026
229	9	Episode 9	2026
230	10	Episode 10	2026
231	11	Episode 11	2026
232	12	Episode 12	2026
