= Valentina Zenere =

Argentine actress, model and singer

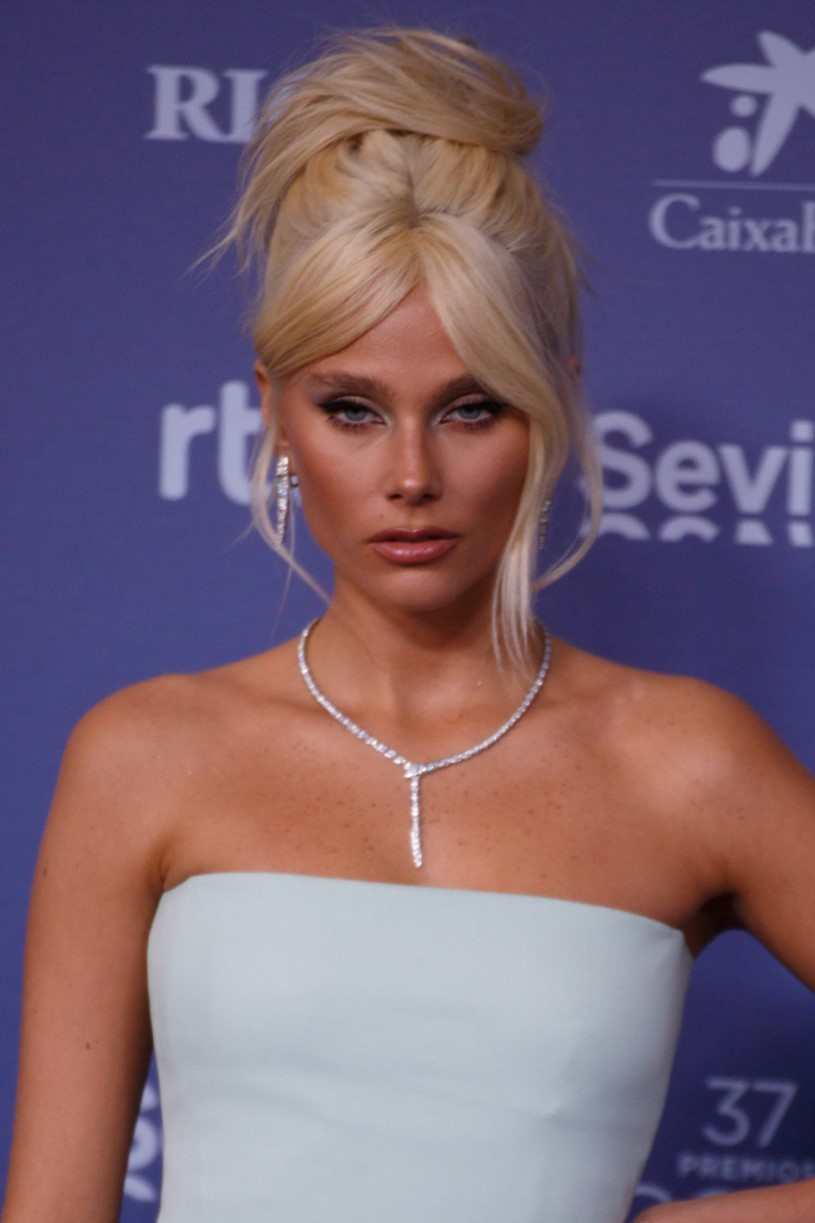
- Zenere in 2023
- Born: 15 January 1997 (age 29); Buenos Aires, Argentina
- Occupations: Actress; model; singer
- Years active: 2010–present
- Partner: Sebastián Ortega (2024–present)
- Family: Luciana Zenere (sister)
- Musical career
- Genres: Pop; Latin
- Instrument: Vocals
- Labels: Walt Disney; Yuukii Records

Valentina Zenere (born 15 January 1997) is an Argentine actress, model and singer, known for her portrayal of Ámbar Smith on the Disney Channel series Soy Luna and on Juacas, where she appeared as the same character. She has also played Alai Inchausti on the Argentine telenovela Casi Ángeles. From 2022 to 2024, she portrayed Isadora Artiñán Goldstein on the Netflix series Elite.

== Life and career ==
Valentina was born to Sergio Zenere, a businessman of Italian origin and Nadia Zenere, a lawyer of Ukrainian origin. She has a younger sister, Luciana Zenere.

Zenere started working in television at a young age, appearing on various television commercials. Her career ultimately began while she was still attending high school (class of 2014). In 2010, aged just 13, Zenere auditioned for, and won, the role of Alai Inchausti on the popular Argentine telenovela Casi Ángeles; this role and subsequent exposure enabled her to take on various small roles and cameos both on television and in stage productions. Most notable was her appearance in a production of Les Misérables.

In 2016, upon graduating high school, Zenere rose to international attention when the original series Soy Luna premiered on Disney Channel Latin America; her portrayal of the antagonist Ámbar Smith received critical and commercial acclaim. She further reprised the role of Ámbar on the Portuguese-language Disney Channel (Brazil) series Juacas. She has maintained close relationships with many of her co-stars, including Eugenia Suárez, Michael Ronda, Carolina Kopelioff, Gastón Vietto, Malena Ratner, and Oriana Sabatini. In 2019, Zenere starred in Ronda's music video "La Diva de la Escuela".

In 2020, Zenere appeared on the fifth season of the Spanish-language Netflix series Cable Girls, becoming a part of the cast. She was further recognized internationally for her portrayal of Isadora in Netflix's critically-acclaimed crime drama Elite.

Zenere currently resides in Madrid, Spain since 2020.

== Filmography ==
=== Film ===
| Year | Title | Role | Notes |
|---|---|---|---|
| 2024 | Nahir | Nahir Galarza | Prime video film |

=== Television ===
| Year | Title | Role | Notes |
|---|---|---|---|
| 2010 | Casi Ángeles | Alai Inchausti | Main cast (season 4) |
| 2011 | Los únicos | Jesica Cervantes | Episodes: «Capitulo 184» and «Capitulo 185» (season 1) |
| 2013–2014 | Aliados | Mara Ulloa | Recurring cast, 11 episodes |
| 2016–2018 | Soy Luna | Ámbar Smith | Main cast (season 1-3), 220 episodes |
| 2019 | Juacas | Ámbar Smith | Guest appearance (season 2), episode "Quem É Esse Cara?" |
| 2020 | Las chicas del cable | Camila Salvador | Main cast (season 5.2); 3 episodes |
| 2022–2024 | Elite | Isadora Artiñán Goldstein | Main cast (season 5-8); 32 episodes |
| 2025, TBA | En el Barro | Marina Delorsi | Main cast (season 1 and 3); 8 episodes |
| 2026 | Amor animal | Justina Elliot | Main cast; 8 episodes |
| TBA | El tiempo puede esperar | Florencia Sciarpello (young) | Main cast |

Music videos

- "La Diva de la Escuela" (2019) – Michael Ronda
- "Boa" (2021) – Carlos Ares
- "Cero Coma" (2022) – Herself
- "Dale" (2023) – Herself
- "Beautiful" (2025) – Emilia

== Discography ==
=== As lead artist ===
List of singles as lead artist, with selected chart positions and certifications, showing year released
| Title | Year | Peaks | Album |
| Title | Year | ARG | Album |
|---|---|---|---|
| "Cero Coma" | 2022 | — | TBA |
| "Dale" | 2023 | — | TBA |
| "Fxcking Noche de Mi Vida" (with Fer Vázquez and Zzoilo) | 2023 | — | TBA |
"—" denotes a recording that did not chart or was not released in that territory.

==== Promotional singles ====
List of promotional singles, showing year released and album name
| Title | Year | Album |
|---|---|---|
| "Sobre Ruedas" (with Karol Sevilla, Katja Martinez, Malena Ratner, Chiara Parravicini and Ana Jara) | 2016 | Soy Luna |
| "Alas (Radio Disney Vivo)" (with Soy Luna cast) | 2016 | Música En Ti |

=== Guest appearances ===
List of other appearances, showing year released, other artist(s) credited and album name
| Title | Year | Other artist(s) | Album |
|---|---|---|---|
| "Prófugos" | 2016 | Ruggero | Soy Luna |
| "Mírame a Mí" | 2016 | —N/a | Soy Luna |
| "Camino" | 2016 | Soy Luna cast | Soy Luna |
| "Vuelo" | 2016 | Soy Luna cast | Música En Ti |
| "A Rodar Mi Vida" | 2016 | Soy Luna cast | Música En Ti |
| "Chicas Así" | 2016 | Malena Ratner and Katja Martínez | Música En Ti |
| "¿Cómo Me Ves?" | 2017 | —N/a | La Vida Es Un Sueño |
| "Valiente" | 2017 | Soy Luna cast | La Vida Es Un Sueño |
| "Cuenta Conmigo"" | 2017 | Soy Luna cast | La Vida Es Un Sueño |
| "I've Got a Feeling" | 2017 | Karol Sevilla, Ruggero, Michael Ronda, Chiara Parravicini, Gastón Vietto and Lionel Ferro | La Vida Es Un Sueño |
| "Footloose" | 2017 | Soy Luna cast | La Vida Es Un Sueño |
| "Catch Me If You Can" | 2017 | —N/a | La Vida Es Un Sueño |
| "Siempre Juntos (Versión Grupal)" | 2017 | Soy Luna cast | La Vida Es Un Sueño |
| "Claroscuro" | 2018 | —N/a | Modo Amar |
| "Solos" | 2018 | Michael Ronda | Modo Amar |
| "Mano a Mano" | 2018 | Karol Sevilla, Katja Martínez, Malena Ratner, Carolina Kopelioff, Chiara Parravicini and Ana Jara | Modo Amar |
| "Todo Puede Cambiar" | 2018 | Soy Luna cast | Modo Amar |

== Awards and nominations ==
| Year | Award | Category | Work | Result |
|---|---|---|---|---|
| 2016 | Kids' Choice Awards México | Favorite Villain | Soy Luna | Won |
| 2016 | Kids' Choice Awards Colombia | Favorite Villain | Soy Luna | Won |
| 2016 | Kids' Choice Awards Argentina | Favorite Villain | Soy Luna | Won |
| 2017 | Kids' Choice Awards Colombia | Trendy Girl | Herself | Won |
| 2017 | Kids' Choice Awards Argentina | Favorite Villain | Soy Luna | Nominated |
| 2017 | Fans Awards | The Goddess | Herself | Nominated |
| 2017 | Fans Awards | Best Fandom | Zeneritas | Nominated |
| 2018 | Kids Choice Awards Argentina | Favorite Couple (with Michael Ronda) | Soy Luna | Won |
| 2019 | Kids Choice Awards México | Favorite Villain | Soy Luna | Won |
