= Modo Amar =

Soy Luna - Modo Amar (Music from the TV Series) is the fourth and final album of the Argentine soap opera Soy Luna. The album was released on 6 April 2018 in some Latin American countries and the rest of the world on digital version.

== Singles ==
"Modo Amar" - First track of the album, is the main song of the third season. Performed by Karol Sevilla, Ruggero Pasquarelli, Michael Ronda, Gastón Vietto, Lionel Ferro, Carolina Kopelioff, Katja Martínez, Malena Ratner, Jorge López, Chiara Parravicini and Ana Caram, the song talks about the friendship between the characters. The song appeared in the trailer for the third season of the telenovela and had its lyric-video released on 22 March. It was the first single from the album.

"Soy Yo" - Second track of the album, is interpreted by the lead characters of the story, Karol Sevilla. It was released on 30 March, and on the same day, the lyric-video of the song was released.

== Release ==
On 16 March 2018, it was released and announced a project (which would launch in a month, four exclusive previews present songs on the album Modo Amar), the program of Disney Channel (Latin America), Disney Planet News. The first preview was on 16 March, the lyric-video of the song "Modo Amar", present on the album, and name of the album. The second on 23 March, the lyrics-video of the song "Soy Yo".

The album includes 16 unpublished songs of the third season, as well as the re-recording of the Mexican classic "Tu Carcel" . And "Nadie Como Tú" and "Mano a Mano", which were part of the soundtrack of the second season of the novel.

In all, there are 19 songs on the album, being the album with more songs of the soap opera (considering that the previous album, La vida es un sueño, is a CD. The album is also the CD with more unpublished songs, since the previous albums of Soy Luna counted on two or three rewrites.
