= Soy Luna Tour - El Ultimo Show =

2026 concert tour

Soy Luna Tour - El Último Show
- Tour by Soy Luna
- Location: Latin America
- Start date: 7 October 2026
- End date: 29 November 2026
- Legs: 1
- No. of shows: 24

Soy Luna concert chronology
- Soy Luna en Vivo (2018); Soy Luna Tour - El Último Show (2026)

Soy Luna Tour - El Último Show is the fourth live concert tour featuring songs from the hit Disney Channel Latin America television series Soy Luna and the Disney+ original series 'Soy Luna: Volver a rodar'. The tour will visit 16 cities and 9 countries across Latin America starting on October 7, 2026, in Buenos Aires at Movistar Arena and concluding on 8 December 2026, in Monterrey at Arena Monterrey.

On October 17, 2026, the Mexico City concert was rebroadcast live on Disney+. Subsequently, the tour's live album, titled Soy Luna Tour: El Último Show – En Vivo, will be released on December 3, 2026.

== Background ==
The tour was officially announced on July 2, 2026. On July 16, 2026, additional shows were announced in Mexico City and Lima, while the second Mexico City and Monterrey shows were announced as sold out. On July 30, a new show was announced in Santiago at 4:00 pm due to high demand. On August 12, yet another new show was announced for Buenos Aires after tickets for the first show sold out in under two days. In early September, an extension of the tour was announced, adding Guatemala City, Mérida and Querétaro. On September 15, it was announced on Instagram that Carolina Kopelioff would join the tour, except for the concerts in Lima and Santiago. On October 4, a new concert in Puebla, at the Auditorio GNP was announced. In early November, three concerts were announced in Mexico to conclude the tour in December, as a tribute to the series protagonist’s country of origin. However, the concerts in Bolivia and Costa Rica were cancelled for production-related reasons that were never publicly disclosed. Moreover despite fans' disappointment, the tour did not extend to Brazil or Europe.

== Cast ==
- Karol Sevilla as Luna Valente
- Ruggero Pasquarelli as Matteo Balsano
- Michael Ronda as Simón Álvarez
- Malena Ratner as Delfina "Delfi" Alzamendi
- Gastón Vietto as Pedro Arias
- Carolina Kopelioff as Nina Simonetti (select dates only)

== Set list ==
1. "Intro"
2. "Alas"
3. "Jet"
4. "Vuelo"
5. "La Vida es un Sueño"
6. "Mariposas"
7. "Pasión"
8. "Quédate"
9. "Eres"
10. "Fush, ¡Te Vas!"
11. "Un Destino"
12. "Sin Fronteras"
13. "De tí me enamoré"
14. "Como una estrella"
15. "Ahora sí"
16. "Siempre Juntos"
17. "Sobre Ruedas"
18. "Allá Voy"
19. "Tenías que dolerme"
20. "Más linda"
21. "Tengo Un Corazón"
22. "Decirte Lo Que Siento"
23. "A la misma meta"
24. "Tu Cárcel"
25. "Modo Amar"
26. "Valiente"

Encore

27. "Jet"
28. "Alas"

Notes

- In Guayaquil, Quito and Montevideo Agustín Bernasconi joined Carolina Kopelioff to perform "Aún no te dije adiós" after "Tengo Un Corazón".

== Shows ==
List of concerts, showing date, city, country, venue, tickets sold, number of available tickets, gross revenue and number of shows
Date (2026)	City	Country	Venue	Number of shows	Attendance	Revenue
7 October	Buenos Aires	Argentina	Movistar Arena	1	—N/a	—N/a
8 October	Buenos Aires	Argentina	Movistar Arena	1	—N/a	—N/a
10 October	Mérida	Mexico	Foro GNP	1	—N/a	—N/a
14 October	Querétaro	Mexico	Auditorio Josefa Ortiz de Domínguez	1	—N/a	—N/a
16 October	Mexico City	Mexico	Arena CDMX	1	—N/a	—N/a
17 October	Mexico City	Mexico	Arena CDMX	1	—N/a	—N/a
19 October	Guadalajara	Mexico	Arena Guadalajara	1	—N/a	—N/a
21 October	Monterrey	Mexico	Arena Monterrey	1	—N/a	—N/a
24 October	Guatemala City	Guatemala	Futeca Cayalá	1	—N/a	—N/a
27 October	Bogota	Colombia	Movistar Arena	1	—N/a	—N/a
31 October	Santo Domingo	Dominican Republic	Ovalo Feria Ganadera	1	—N/a	—N/a
4 November	Puebla	Mexico	Auditorio GNP	1	—N/a	—N/a
12 November	Guayaquil	Ecuador	Coliseo Voltaire Paladines	1	—N/a	—N/a
14 November	Quito	Ecuador	Coliseo Rumiñahui	1	—N/a	—N/a
17 November	Montevideo	Uruguay	Antel Arena	1	—N/a	—N/a
19 November	Lima	Peru	Arena 1 Park	1	—N/a	—N/a
20 November	Lima	Peru	Arena 1 Park	1	—N/a	—N/a
22 November	Santiago	Chile	Movistar Arena	2	—N/a	—N/a
29 November	Córdoba	Argentina	Quality Arena	1	—N/a	—N/a
4 December	Guadalajara	Mexico	Arena Guadalajara	1	—N/a	—N/a
6 December	Mexico City	Mexico	Mexico City Arena	1	—N/a	—N/a
7 December	Monterrey	Mexico	Arena Monterrey	1	—N/a	—N/a
8 December	Monterrey	Mexico	Arena Monterrey	1	—N/a	—N/a

=== Canceled show ===
List of canceled concert
Date (2026)	City	Country	Venue	Number of shows	Reason
29 October	San José	Costa Rica	Parque Viva	1	Unknown
6 November	La Paz	Bolivia	Teatro al Aire Libre Jaime Laredo	1	Unknown
8 November	Santa Cruz de la Sierra	Bolivia	Sonilum Arena	1	Unknown
