= Soy Luna =

Argentine telenovela

- Genre: Telenovela
- Created by: Jorge Edelstein
- Screenplay by: Gabriela Fiore; Jorge Edelstein
- Directed by: Jorge Nisco; Martín Sabán
- Theme music composer: Eduardo Emilio Frigerio; Federico San Millán; Florencia Ciarlo
- Opening theme: "Alas" performed by Karol Sevilla
- Country of origin: Argentina
- Original language: Spanish
- No. of seasons: 4
- No. of episodes: 232 (list of episodes)

Production
- Executive producer: Diego Carabelli
- Producers: Adrián Suar; Fernando Blanco
- Running time: 45 minutes
- Production company: Pol-ka

Original release
- Network: Disney Channel
- Release: 14 March 2016 – 17 August 2018
- Network: Disney+
- Release: 24 July 2026 – present

Related
- Violetta; BIA

Soy Luna (English: I am Luna, also known as Soy Luna: Let's Roll Again) is an Argentine telenovela produced by Disney Channel Latin America that aired on 14 March 2016. The first episode of Soy Luna premiered with over 2.3 million views in Argentina alone. Developed by Disney Channel Latin America and produced by Disney Channel Europe, the Middle East and Africa (EMEA), Disney Channel Russia and Disney Channel Asia the series stars Karol Sevilla along with Ruggero Pasquarelli, Valentina Zenere and Michael Ronda. Soy Luna is the second original production of Disney Channel Latin America after Violetta (2012–2015), and the third musical telenovela on the channel following the steps of Patito Feo (2007–2011), the show that paved the way for Disney's Latin series.

The supporting cast features Agustín Bernasconi, Malena Ratner, Katja Martínez, Jorge López, Ana Jara, Chiara Parravicini, Gastón Vietto, Lionel Ferro, Carolina Kopelioff, Lucila Gandolfo, Rodrigo Pedreira, Ana Carolina Valsagna, David Murí, Ezequiel Rodríguez and Caro Ibarra. Estela Ribeiro, Roberto Carnaghi, Giovanna Reynaud, Pasquale Di Nuzzo, Jandino, Victoria Suárez Battan and Joaquín Berthold joined the main cast in later seasons. Luz Cipriota, Diego Alcalá, Germán Tripel, Antonella Querzoli and Paula Kohan used to also star on the show, but their characters were written off, whilst Bernasconi and Ferro left the series during the final season.

In May 2017, the series was renewed for a third and final season, which premiered on 16 April 2018. After the airing of the final episode, Disney broadcast a documentary titled Soy Luna: The Journey which recounts the main actors' most emotional experiences in the series over the last three years.

In November 2020, a documentary/special titled Soy Luna: El último concierto was officially announced. It was exclusively released to Disney+ on 26 February 2021.

On 23 October 2024, during an interview for Radio Disney, Karol Sevilla confirmed that the series would return for a revival, which began filming in June 2025. The new season premiered on 24 July 2026 on Disney+ and is titled Soy Luna: Let’s Roll Again.

== Series overview ==
Series	Episodes		Originally released	
Series	Episodes		First released	Last released
1	80	40	14 March 2016	6 May 2016
1	80	40	4 July 2016	26 August 2016
2	80	40	17 April 2017	9 June 2017
2	80	40	7 August 2017	29 September 2017
3	60	30	16 April 2018	25 May 2018
3	60	30	9 July 2018	17 August 2018
4	12		24 July 2026	24 July 2026

=== Season 1 (2016) ===
Luna Valente is a 16-year-old girl who loves to roller-skate and lives with her adoptive parents in Cancún, Mexico, in the mansion where her parents work. Luna works as a delivery girl at a fast food joint with her best friend, Simon. On a delivery she bumps into a boy named Matteo. Matteo flirts with her and nicknames her Delivery Girl, Luna nicknames him Chico Fresa, a nickname meaning he is very conceited/rich.

However, her life is completely turned upside-down when the mansion's new owner, Sharon Benson arrives. Luna has a bad encounter with Sharon's goddaughter, Ambar, when she accidentally spills a milkshake on Ambar. Ambar then pushes her in the pool with her skates on. Luckily Matteo, who happens to be Ambar's boyfriend, saves her from drowning. Sharon is pleased with the work performance of Luna's parents and offers them double pay and to give Luna education in one of the best schools, if they go work in her manor in Buenos Aires, Argentina.

Forced to accept, Luna has to leave her friends, job, and life behind, but her transition is eased when she comes across the roller skating rink named the Jam & Roller, where her existing passion for roller skating is reinvigorated as she discovers the world of freestyle skate-dancing. The rink brings her new friends, Nina, Jim, and Yam, a new job as skating rink assistant, and a new passion. She's also forced to endure the challenges of a vigorous new school system. To make matters worse, Luna is targeted by Ambar, who goes to the same school where she is the most popular. Ambar uses her two best friends, Delfi and Jazmin to also target Luna.

Luna's best friend, Simon, decides to go after her, leading him to forming the Roller Band with Nico and Pedro (Part of the Staff at the Jam & Roller). Luna then begins to fall in love with Matteo, who like Ambar is the most popular at school.

Meanwhile, Sharon is threatened by her past as she discovers that her niece, Sol Benson is still alive. Many years ago Sharon had burned the manor down, leading to the death of her sister Lili and her husband, Bernie, who Sharon loved. Sharon believed Sol, daughter of Lili and Bernie, had also died in the fire. Sharon, as the closest legal relative to Bernie, changed her last name to Benson and kept Lili and Bernie's fortune. With the help of her personal assistant, Rey, she investigates to find out who and where is Sol Benson.

Meanwhile, many years back, a worker of the manor named Roberto helped little Sol Benson escape the fire. He left the baby girl at an orphanage in Mexico City. She was eventually adopted by Monica and Miguel Valente. They named her Luna because of the moon pendant she had. Destiny brought Luna to her birth home and past without her knowing it.

Roberto ends up dying in a hospital. But he has the Sun part of Sol's pendant (which is a Sun and Moon that conjoin). He gives the Sun piece to a pair of hospital employees, Tino and Cato (two clumsy best friends), and asks them to go to the Benson Family to find and return it to Sol.

Sharon and Rey investigate any possible connection to the Benson Family, not knowing that Luna is actually Sol Benson. Sharon and Rey realize Tino and Cato aren't so smart so they stand no threat but they decide to keep them close as workers in the manor. Tino and Cato have their own storyline as they try to accomplish their mission given by Roberto. Cato also falls in love with Amanda, the house's maid.

Meanwhile, there are other storylines, like the rising of the Roller Band (Nico, Pedro, and Simon). Others include Nina's (Luna's new best friend) journey as FelicityForNow, an undercover account that lets her speak her real thoughts, while she is in love with Gaston, Matteo's best friend. Jim (Jimena) and Yam (Yamila) are two best friends who do everything together. They are both in love with Ramiro, a guy who wants to live off his skating and rapping.

But this all changes when Jim begins to fall for Nico and Ramiro falls in love with Yam. Another storyline is Jazmin and Delfi, Ambar's best friends and accomplices. They have their own channel named "Fab'n'Chic". Delfi likes Gaston, to the point where she pretends to be FelicityForNow after seeing how much Gaston likes the account. She then begins to better herself when she gets closer to Pedro.

Luna must balance her new responsibilities and course load, manage her relationships, and investigate the mysteries surrounding dreams of her past and present.

=== Season 2 (2017) ===
The holidays are over and everyone returns home. Luna walks to a revealing truth, with illusion, in her reunion with Matteo. Nobody knows the secret that Matteo hides which is that he will leave to Oxford next year, but Luna is willing to fight with the wind and the air to find out. Over time, Luna helps Matteo to discover his true passion and he must cope with the pressure of his demanding father.

In the Benson mansion is a tense atmosphere after the arrival of Alfredo, father of Mrs. Sharon, changes the routine and brings back memories of the past. Luna feels a strong sympathy for this funny man who looks so much alike. This is because Alfredo is actually Luna's biological grandfather. Their relationship, with the help of Nina, marks a new personal path for Luna and helps investigate the mysteries of her past.

During this time The Jam and Roller is bought by Vidia (an online platform) which uses cameras to show the world what the Jam and Roller is like. Tamara (Instructor and Trainer) decides to leave and leaves Luna in charge. In a themed party, named the Roller Jam, Ambar destroys the cameras leading to the place burning down.

Everyone gets together to help rebuild it. Although Vidia isn't interested but they save el Jam and Roller with the help of Nina's father, Ricardo, who designs an app similar to Vidia's but much more features and better quality. The Jam and Roller is saved and they get a new instructor, Juliana, a strict and mean woman with a cane who was once a famous skater, Marissa Mint, who had an accident that ruined her career. Juliana was also one of the few skaters to receive the award of The Glass Skate, but she keeps the award and her career a secret.

Not only this but Rey and Sharon find out Luna is Sol Benson after Rey decided to investigate on Luna. So they make Ambar pretend to be Sol Benson to keep their future and fortune safe.

Holiday conflicts affect the group of others. Ambar, Jazmin, Delfi, Gastón, Ramiro and Matteo who are finishing their studies, must decide which way to go. Ambar is planning in walking Sharon's steps of studying business and law in Paris. Delfi decides to follow her passion for photography and Jazmin is undecided. Matteo decides he will become a professional musician and faces his father. Gaston plans on going to Oxford. Ramiro wants to live off his skating and rapping. During this time Delfi and Jazmin break off Ambar's friendship as they realize they are just puppets to her.

Ambar begins to get closer to Simon. She does this so that she can hurt Luna by taking her best friend from her. But when they spend more time together Ambar and Simon begin to fall in love.

During this time new characters arrive like an old foe of Simon appears, Benicio. Benicio and Simon worked in Foodger Wheels in Cancun together but Benicio was untrustworthy and stole money and blamed Simon. Benicio gets off on the wrong start with Juliana, as Benicio tries to take Simon's spot on the Roller Band but Juliana prohibits it. Benicio allies with Ambar and they break Juliana's glass skate. Benicio is discovered and is kicked out, but he doesn't reveal Ambar as his accomplice.

A new man appears, Garry, Nico's uncle who is an ex-surfer and business man with his own surf team. He becomes part owner of el Jam and Roller, he wants to change the name to his surf team's name, Red Sharks. The Roller's team enters a new competition, Roda Fest, where they meet their ultimate foes, The Sliders.

Both The Sliders and The Jam&Roller make it to the finals in Cancun, Mexico. Ambar is then discovered by Simon that she caused the fire and broke Juliana's Glass Skate. Ambar is spared from the authorities as Sharon uses all of her influences to protect her. Ambar is kicked out the team, so she allies herself with the leader of the Sliders, Emilia, to destroy the Roller's team.

Alfredo then discovers about Luna being Sol Benson but Sharon puts him in an asylum. She also fires Tino y Cato. Cato then goes to propose to Amanda and she says yes. Sharon discovers that Rey was blackmailing her threatening to reveal the truth about Luna. Sharon fires him, and Rey helps Alfredo escape and gives him the proof that Luna is Sol.

The Jam & Roller face off with the Sliders at Roda Fest. The Sliders win the competition but Luna wins the Glass Skate for el Jam & Roller. Luna then discovers her past with the help of Alfredo. Sharon escapes leaving Ambar behind telling her to lie and say she didn't know anything. Luna now knowing she is Sol Benson is more distant from Mateo. Meanwhile, Gary decides that the Jam & Roller exist no more, now giving birth to the Red Sharks.

=== Season 3 (2018) ===
Luna/Sol, has returned with her adoptive parents and her grandfather to the Benson mansion in Argentina. The mansion is now theirs. Àmbar has changed her clothing style to gothic and has turned completely dark after the events of the previous seasons. A new boy named Erik has fallen in love with Nina and becomes a couple. Luna and Matteo gets closer and closer, as Emilia tries to drive them further and further apart, leading to Matteo to have a devastating accident, that leaves him in the hospital for quite some time, and leaves him with more or less memory, than he had before. the Roller Band gets kicked out of their apartment, so they move to Luna's house.

And a new boy arrives named Michel, he moves into the house with the Roller Band, and finds an interest in Luna, and they get very close, which makes Matteo very jealous, later, Michel gets an offer to study abroad in Rome, Italy, and he asks Luna to choose for him, it is clear to Luna, that she still loves Matteo. Michel leaves for Rome and tells Luna to fight for Matteo's love, Simon tells Matteo that it was a misunderstanding, that Luna never was in love with Michel, and that Luna loves him. after Matteo hears this, he tells Luna that he loves her, the two get back together happily, and they both kiss. Meanwhile, Sharon wants to take revenge on her father and the Valentes and decides to go back to Buenos Aires in several disguises.

Later in the season, Àmbar reverts to her normal clothing style, changes her attitude, and starts dating Simon. During the season, Luna is continuing discovering some other secrets from the past, including why Sharon hates her so much, until she finds a chest, which, according to her, would have all the answers she was looking for. Near the end, Sharon, not wanting her to let that to happen, decides to burn the chest so that it will never be used or revealed again, without considering the consequences that would end up causing a fire in the Benson mansion, with her, Luna, Ambar, Alfredo and Rey being affected.

During the season finale, a month after the fire, Luna finally opens the chest and discovers the reason why Sharon had always held a grudge against her so much since she was orphaned as a baby: sometime after the day, her real parents Lily and Bernie died in the fire that occurred in the mansion at that time.

Ambar finally decides to forgive Sharon after all the mistakes she made. the Roller team started performing with the song "Todo Puede Cambiar" and Luna and Matteo are back together again. Àmbar, Delfi and Jazmin have made up for it and are friends again. At the end Luna celebrates her 18th birthday and sings the song "Soy Yo" at her party, concluding the series.

=== Season 4 (2026) ===
After an accident during a competition that took her off the rink, Luna returns to Jam & Roller, the place where she grew up and became a renowned skater. Her efforts are complicated by a villain working in secret, as she deals with obstacles and betrayals outside of the villain's scope.

== Cast and characters ==
- Karol Sevilla as Luna Valente
- Ruggero Pasquarelli as Matteo Balsano
- Valentina Zenere as Ámbar Smith (seasons 1–3)
- Michael Ronda as Simón Álvarez
- Malena Ratner as Delfina "Delfi" Alzamendi
- Agustín Bernasconi as Gastón Perida (Note: Bernasconi is still credited in the main cast throughout the third season after making his last appearance in the eleventh episode.)
- Katja Martínez as Jazmín Carbajal (seasons 1–3)
- Ana Jara as Jimena "Jim" Medina (seasons 1–3)
- Jorge López as Ramiro Ponce (seasons 1–3)
- Chiara Parravicini as Yamila "Yam" Sánchez (seasons 1–3)
- Gastón Vietto as Pedro Arias
- Lionel Ferro as Nicolás "Nico" Navarro (seasons 1–3) (Note: Ferro is still credited in the main cast throughout the second part of the third season after making his last appearance in the thirty seventh episode.)
- Carolina Kopelioff as Nina Simonetti
- Luz Cipriota as Tamara Ríos (season 1; guest season 2) (Note: Cipriota was not credited in the second season.)
- Lucila Gandolfo as Sharon Benson
- Rodrigo Pedreira as Reinaldo "Rey" Guitierrez (seasons 1–3)
- David Murí as Miguel Valente
- Ana Carolina Valsagna as Mónica Valente
- Diego Sassi as Tino (seasons 1–2)
- Germán Tripel as Cato (seasons 1–2)
- Antonella Querzoli as Amanda (seasons 1–2)
- Paula Kohan as Mora Barza (seasons 1–2; recurring season 3)
- Ezequiel Rodríguez as Ricardo Simonetti (seasons 1–3) (Note: Rodríguez is still credited in the main cast throughout the third season despite appearing in six episodes.)
- Caro Ibarra as Ana Valparaíso (seasons 1–3)
- Estela Ribeiro as Juliana (seasons 2–3)
- Roberto Carnaghi as Alfredo Benson (seasons 2–4)
- Jandino as Eric (season 3)
- Giovanna Reynaud as Emilia (season 3; recurring season 2)
- Pasquale Di Nuzzo as Benicio (season 3; recurring season 2) (Note: The actor is credited as Lino Di Nuzzo throughout the third season.)
- Vicky Suárez Battan as Maggie (season 3)
- Joaquín Berthold as Gary López (season 3; recurring season 2) (Note: Berthold is still credited throughout the second part of the third season after making his last appearance in the thirthy ninth episode.)
- Blanca Palacio as Salomé (season 4)
- Dolores Moriondo as Lola Dons (season 4)
- Magalí Altamirano as Valeria / Azul (season 4)
- Thomas Lepera as Beltrán (season 4)
- Kevsho as Lenny (season 4)

== Broadcast ==
The first season originally aired from 14 March 2016 to 26 August 2016 in Latin America. The series premiered on Disney Channel in Scandinavia on 10 October 2016. In the United States, the Spanish-language UniMás channel was set to air the series from 17 April 2017. However, the show was quietly taken off schedule. Eventually, the first season aired on 20 February 2018 on UniMás, and then later on Galavisión. After having a dormant entry for the series at launch, the first season was briefly made available on Disney+ with English subtitles in December 2019 before its official release on 1 January 2020. The second and third seasons followed on 18 September 2020. An English dub was produced for Disney Channel in the United Kingdom but it ultimately went unaired.

== Music ==
=== Soundtrack albums ===
Title	Soundtrack details	Peak chart positions								Certifications
Title	Soundtrack details	ARG	AUT	FRA	GER	MEX	POL	PRT	SPA	Certifications
Soy Luna	Released: 26 February 2016; Label: Walt Disney; Format: CD, digital download	1	8	6	20	5	47	3	1	AMPROFON: Gold; CAPIF: Platinum; PROMUSICAE: Gold; ZPAV: Gold
Música en ti	Released: 26 August 2016; Label: Walt Disney; Format: CD, digital download	1	24	29	73	10	—	22	11	AMPROFON: Gold
La vida es un sueño	Released: 3 March 2017; Label: Walt Disney; Format: CD, digital download	3	17	25	32	3	—	—	5	AMPROFON: Gold
Modo Amar	Released: 6 April 2018; Label: Walt Disney; Format: CD, digital download	—	28	—	67	—	—	—	18	
"—" denotes a recording that did not chart or was not released in that territory.

=== Remix album ===
Title	Album details
Soy Luna Remixes (AtellaGali Remixes)	Released: 6 October 2017; Label: Walt Disney; Format: Digital download

== Ratings ==
Season	Timeslot (ART)	Episodes		First aired		Last aired		Rank
Season	Timeslot (ART)	Episodes		Date	Viewers (millions)	Date	Viewers (millions)	Rank
1	Mon–Fri 6:00 pm	80	40	14 March 2016	2.3	6 May 2016	5.3	#1
1	Mon–Fri 6:00 pm	80	40	4 July 2016	2.3	26 August 2016	5.3	#1
2	Mon–Fri 6:00 pm	80	40	17 April 2017	TBD	9 June 2017	31	#1
2	Mon–Fri 6:00 pm	80	40	7 August 2017	TBD	29 September 2017	31	#1

Note: The ratings for the first season are only from Argentina. Those of the second season are from all countries from Latin America.

== Awards and nominations ==
Year	Award	Category	Recipient	Result
2016	Kids' Choice Awards Mexico	Favorite Actor	Michael Ronda	Nominated
2016	Kids' Choice Awards Mexico	Favorite Actress	Karol Sevilla	Nominated
2016	Kids' Choice Awards Mexico	Favorite Villain	Valentina Zenere	Won
2016	Kids' Choice Awards Mexico	Favorite TV Series	Soy Luna	Nominated
2016	Kids' Choice Awards Colombia	Favorite Actor	Ruggero Pasquarelli	Won
2016	Kids' Choice Awards Colombia	Favorite Actor	Michael Ronda	Nominated
2016	Kids' Choice Awards Colombia	Favorite Actress	Karol Sevilla	Nominated
2016	Kids' Choice Awards Colombia	Favorite Actress	Katja Martínez	Nominated
2016	Kids' Choice Awards Colombia	Favorite Villain	Valentina Zenere	Won
2016	Kids' Choice Awards Colombia	Favorite TV Series	Soy Luna	Nominated
2016	Kids' Choice Awards Argentina	Favorite Actor	Ruggero Pasquarelli	Won
2016	Kids' Choice Awards Argentina	Favorite Actor	Michael Ronda	Nominated
2016	Kids' Choice Awards Argentina	Favorite Actress	Karol Sevilla	Won
2016	Kids' Choice Awards Argentina	Favorite Actress	Katja Martínez	Nominated
2016	Kids' Choice Awards Argentina	Trendy Boy	Agustín Bernasconi	Won
2016	Kids' Choice Awards Argentina	Trendy Boy	Lionel Ferro	Nominated
2016	Kids' Choice Awards Argentina	Favorite Villain	Valentina Zenere	Won
2016	Kids' Choice Awards Argentina	Favorite TV Series	Soy Luna	Won
2016	Meus Prêmios Nick	Favorite International TV Series	Soy Luna	Nominated
2017	Kids' Choice Awards Mexico	Favorite Actor	Michael Ronda	Won
2017	Kids' Choice Awards Mexico	Favorite Actress	Karol Sevilla	Nominated
2017	Kids' Choice Awards Mexico	Favorite TV Series	Soy Luna	Won
2017	Premios Martín Fierro de Cable	Best Children/Youth Program	Soy Luna	Won
2017	Kids' Choice Awards Colombia	Favorite Actor	Ruggero Pasquarelli	Won
2017	Kids' Choice Awards Colombia	Favorite Actress	Karol Sevilla	Won
2017	Kids' Choice Awards Colombia	Trendy Girl	Valentina Zenere	Won
2017	Kids' Choice Awards Colombia	Favorite TV Series	Soy Luna	Won
2017	Kids' Choice Awards Argentina	Favorite Actor	Michael Ronda	Won
2017	Kids' Choice Awards Argentina	Favorite Actress	Carolina Kopelioff	Won
2017	Kids' Choice Awards Argentina	Trendy Boy	Agustín Bernasconi	Won
2017	Kids' Choice Awards Argentina	Favorite Villain	Valentina Zenere	Nominated
2017	Kids' Choice Awards Argentina	Favorite TV Series	Soy Luna	Won
2017	Lunas del Auditorio	Family Show	Soy Luna Live	Nominated
2017	Tú Awards	#Portada del año	Soy Luna	Nominated
2017	Tú Awards	#Tour del año	Soy Luna Live	Nominated
2017	Tú Awards	#El chico sexy	Michael Ronda	Nominated
2017	Tú Awards	#El chico sexy	Ruggero Pasquarelli	Nominated
2017	Meus Prêmios Nick	Favorite TV Series	Soy Luna	Won
2018	Premios Gardel	Best children's album	La vida es un sueño	Nominated
2018	Kids' Choice Awards Mexico	Favorite Actor	Michael Ronda	Won
2018	Kids' Choice Awards Mexico	Favorite Actress	Karol Sevilla	Won
2018	Kids' Choice Awards Mexico	Favorite Villain	Giovanna Reynaud	Won
2018	Kids' Choice Awards Mexico	Favorite Ship	Lutteo (Luna + Matteo)	Won
2018	Kids' Choice Awards Mexico	Favorite Show	Soy Luna	Won
2018	Kids' Choice Awards Argentina	Favorite Actor	Agustín Bernasconi	Nominated
2018	Kids' Choice Awards Argentina	Favorite Actor	Michael Ronda	Nominated
2018	Kids' Choice Awards Argentina	Favorite Actress	Karol Sevilla	Won
2018	Kids' Choice Awards Argentina	Favorite Actress	Carolina Kopelioff	Nominated
2018	Kids' Choice Awards Argentina	Favorite Villain	Giovanna Reynaud	Nominated
2018	Kids' Choice Awards Argentina	Favorite Ship	Simbar (Simón + Ámbar)	Won
2018	Kids' Choice Awards Argentina	Favorite Show	Soy Luna	Won
2019	Kids' Choice Awards Mexico	Favorite Actor	Michael Ronda	Nominated
2019	Kids' Choice Awards Mexico	Favorite Actress	Karol Sevilla	Won
2019	Kids' Choice Awards Mexico	Trendy Boy	Ruggero Pasquarelli	Nominated
2019	Kids' Choice Awards Mexico	Favorite Villain	Valentina Zenere	Won
2019	Kids' Choice Awards Mexico	Favorite Show	Soy Luna	Nominated
2026	Kids' Choice Awards	Favorite Kids TV Show	Soy Luna: Let’s Roll Again	Pending

== Tours ==
- Soy Luna en Concierto (2017)
- Soy Luna Live (2018)
- Soy Luna En Vivo (2018)
- Soy Luna Tour - El Ultimo Show (2026)
