= Santander Arena (Santiago) =

Multipurpose indoor arena in Santiago, Chile

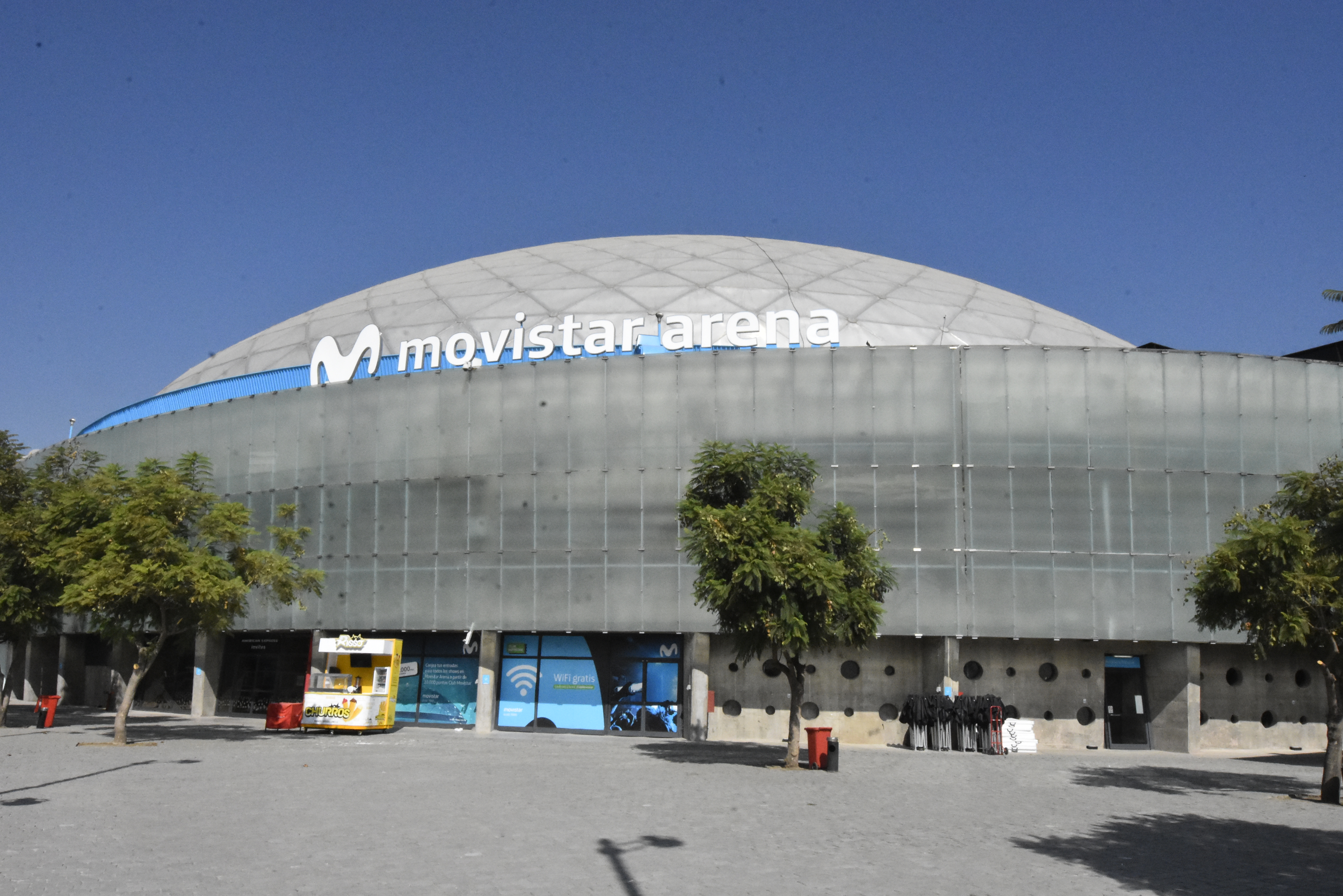
- The arena under its previous name, Movistar Arena, April 2018
- Interactive map of Santander Arena
- Former names: Metropolitan Indoor Stadium; Arena Santiago (April 2006 – October 2008); Movistar Arena (October 2008 – September 2026)
- Location: Av. Beaucheff 1204, O'Higgins Park; Santiago, Chile
- Coordinates: 33°27′46″S 70°39′43″W
- Owner: Hiller Investments
- Operator: ASM Global
- Capacity: 12,000 (stands); 15,500 (concerts)

Construction
- Groundbreaking: 1956
- Opened: April 15, 2006
- Architect: Mario Recordón

Santander Arena, previously known as Movistar Arena, is a 15,500-seat multi-purpose indoor arena in Santiago, Chile. It is located inside O'Higgins Park, in downtown Santiago. Its main structure was built in 1956, but it remained unfinished and without a roof, until the roof was installed in 2000.

The arena was ultimately purchased by Peter Hiller who opened it on 15 April 2006 as Arena Santiago with a seat-capacity of 12,000. Telefónica's cell phone division Movistar bought the stadium's naming rights, changing its name on October 6, 2008, while also expanding its capacity by 5,000 seats. It is one of the largest multipurpose arenas in South America, with a total surface is 44,000 m^{2}. An additional 3,000 seats can be placed over the court during concerts, boosting the total capacity to 17,000 seats.

The venue is the busiest indoor arena in South America, with $94.6 million in gross revenue and 1.58 million tickets sold in 2023.

== History ==
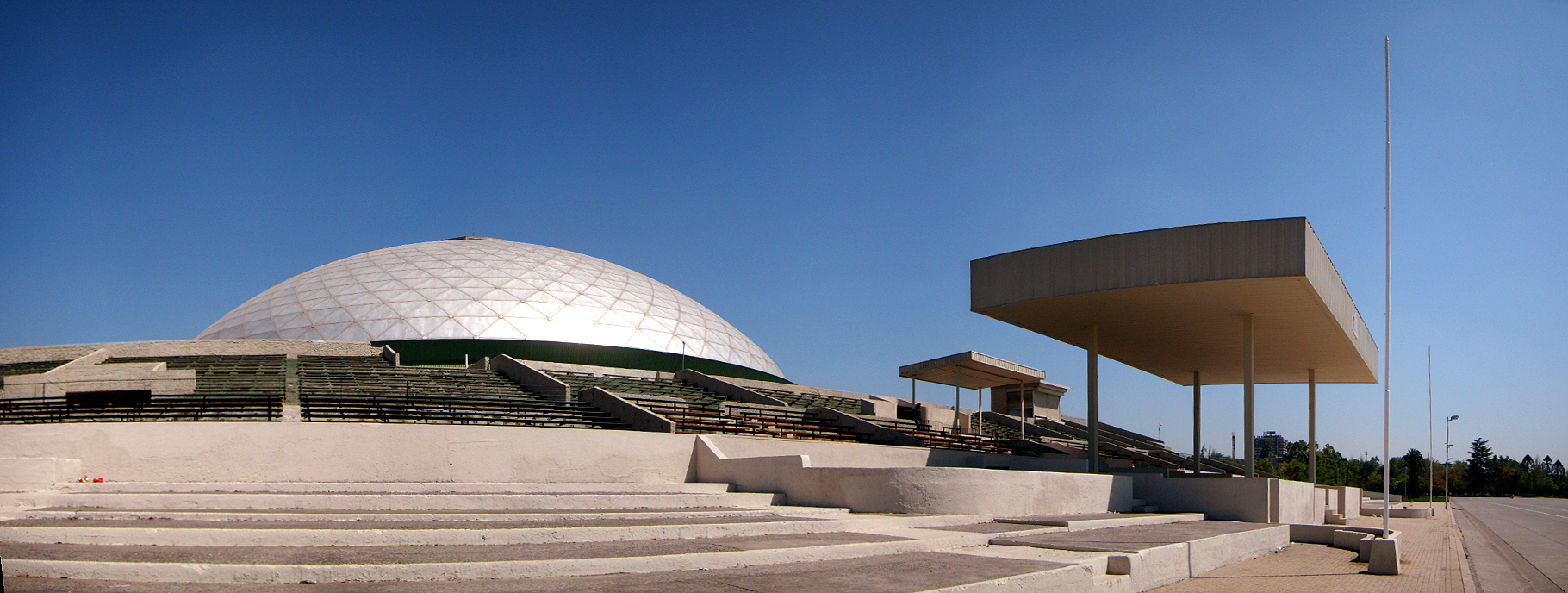
The arena is next to the stands of the Esplanade of O'Higgins Park.

The original building was designed and conceived by Mario Recordón in 1956 with the name "Metropolitan Indoor Stadium" to be the seat of the World Basketball Championship. However, funding was redirected to remodeling the Estadio Nacional de Chile, with a view to hosting the 1962 FIFA World Cup. To the end, the stadium was left in total neglect.

In 1998, during the term of President Eduardo Frei Ruiz-Tagle the decision was made to complete the stadium. The work was financed by Hiller Investments, which received a grant from the Ministry of Public Works with a 20-year lease.

Arena Santiago was symbolically opened on March 7, 2006 by then President Ricardo Lagos, and it was inaugurated on April 15 that year by his successor, Michelle Bachelet.

In 2008, the stadium signed a contract with portable phone company Movistar Chile for 16 years.

In February 2010, American icon Beyoncé performed a sold-out concert there during her I Am... Tour, marking her first show in the country.

In October 2013, Violetta cast performed 6 concerts and sold over 60,000 tickets at the venue through their tour Violetta en Vivo. They returned for their last tour, performing six shows in July 2015 as part of the Violetta Live International Tour.

Between 2017 and 2026, Soy Luna cast performed 12 concerts at the venue through their tours Soy Luna en Concierto, Soy Luna en Vivo and Soy Luna Tour - El Ultimo Show.

On 9 May 2017, Linkin Park performed at the venue on the One More Light World Tour.

On 13 March 2018, Pearl Jam gave a concert to 17,000 people, setting a new attendance record at the venue.

On 5 November 2018, Robbie Williams performed on the arena as part of The Heavy Entertainment Show Tour.

Iron Maiden played their first-ever arena show in Chile on 14 October 2019, as part of their Legacy of the Beast World Tour. The show was announced because the first concert at the Estadio Nacional on October 15 sold out all the 63,000 tickets half a year before the show.

Europe played in Movistar Arena on September 27, 2019 as part of their world tour called Walk The Earth Tour.

The arena was the volleyball venue during the 2023 Pan American Games.

Kylie Minogue played the arena on August 12, 2025 as part of her Tension Tour.

In September 2026, the venue was renamed to Santander Arena after a deal with the Spanish bank group Santander.

== Davis Cup incident ==
On 7 April 2000, the stadium played host to a Chile-Argentina Davis Cup tie. During the second singles match between Nicolás Massú and Mariano Zabaleta, the crowd became violent, throwing fruit, coins and plastic chairs at the Argentine team. As a result, the Chilean Tennis Federation was fined nearly US$50,000 and was prohibited from hosting Davis Cup games for two years.
