= It Was Always Me =

Colombian television series

- Spanish: Siempre Fui Yo
- Genre: Mystery; Drama; Musical
- Created by: Alejandro Stoessel; Iván Stoessel
- Composers: Mauricio Rengifo; Andrés Torres
- Country of origin: Colombia
- Original language: Spanish
- No. of seasons: 2
- No. of episodes: 18

Production
- Executive producer: Leonardo Aranguibel
- Production locations: Bogotá; Cartagena; Barú; Honda; Girardot
- Cinematography: Julián Torres
- Editors: Diego Croci; Juan Pablo Lloret
- Running time: 38–56 minutes
- Production company: The Mediapro Studio

Original release
- Network: Disney+
- Release: 15 June 2022 – 17 January 2024

It Was Always Me (Spanish: Siempre Fui Yo) is a Colombian mystery-drama television series, which is produced by The Mediapro Studio for The Walt Disney Company. In Spain and Latin America, the series was released on Disney+ on 15 June 2022.

The series has been renewed for a second season, which was released on 17 January 2024.

== Plot ==
=== Season 1 ===
In Mexico, the life of journalism student Lupe changes abruptly when she learns that her father, known as "El Faraón" (The Pharaoh), has died. Considered a music legend in Colombia, Lupe decides to leave her native Mexico to attend her father's funeral in Cartagena. Upon her arrival in Colombia, Lupe meets a mysterious young man named Noah, who turns out to have been her late father's assistant. Lupe decides to stay when she begins to suspect that her father's death was not an accident after all. She enters a music competition to investigate her late father's entourage for more information and clues about his mysterious death. In the process, Lupe must face her greatest fear: singing in public. Together with Noah, Lupe embarks on a musical adventure full of danger, mystery, intrigue, and romance. Lupe can't trust anyone, however, not even Noah, and after a long road with many false turns, she discovers the truth hidden in the heart of Colombia's Caribbean region.

=== Season 2 ===
Three years after the broadcast of the contest show "Lucas Martin Presenta: El camino del Faraón", the former contestants reunite to record a reunion album on Pipe's private island.

He was, by then, one of the most famous rock stars in Colombia, which drastically changed his life and that of others. Lupe has set her aims on Mexico, where she pursues her vocation as a journalist; Noah, on the other hand, works on a bar he inherited from his family in Colombia. The reunion album offers an opportunity to get close again, but it is marred when a valuable necklace given to Lupe by El Faraón is stolen on the first night. Along the season, secrets and uncomfortable truths come to light in ways that cause tension between the old friends and threaten the life they had known until then.

== Cast ==
- Karol Sevilla as María Guadalupe "Lupe" del Mar Díaz Mint
- Pipe Bueno as Noah Cortez
- Christian Tappan as Silvestre "El Faraón" Díaz
- José Julián Gaviria as Felipe "Pipe" Díaz
- Simón Savi as Charly Fabián
- Antonio Sanint as Lucas Martin
- Adriana Romero as Wendy Núñez
- Juliana Velásquez as Angie Rueda
- Dubán Prado as Samuel "Sammy" García Herrera
- Alejandro Gutiérrez as Kevin Cepeda
- Katherine Escobar as Mercedes Cepeda
- Eliana Raventós as Lucía Ibarra
- Marisol Correa as Cecilia Mint
- Felipe Botero as Ariel Rozo
- Esther Sanz as Sofía
- Melanie Dell´olmo as Zoe
- Juan David Penagos as Fran
- Eduardo Pérez as Benjamín

== Episodes ==
=== Series overview ===
Series	Episodes	Originally released
1	10	15 June 2022
2	8	17 January 2024

=== Season 1 (2022) ===
No. overall	No. in season	Title	Directed by	Written by	Original release date
1	1	"The Path of El Faraón" "El camino del Faraón"	Juan Felipe Cano	Marina Efron, Andres Salgado & Constanza Novick	15 June 2022
2	2	"The Leap" "El salto"	Juan Felipe Cano	Marina Efron, Andres Salgado, Constanza Novick & Carmen López-Areal	15 June 2022
3	3	"The Bet" "La apuesta"	Juan Felipe Cano	Marina Efron, Andres Salgado, Constanza Novick & Carmen López-Areal	15 June 2022
4	4	"Anonymous" "Anónimo"	Juan Felipe Cano	Marina Efron, Andres Salgado, Constanza Novick & Carmen López-Areal	15 June 2022
5	5	"Guilty" "Culpables"	Juan Felipe Cano	Marina Efron & Carmen López-Areal	15 June 2022
6	6	"Paper Boats" "Barcos de papel"	Juan Felipe Cano	Marina Efron & Carmen López-Areal	15 June 2022
7	7	"The Semi-final" "La semifinal"	Juan Felipe Cano	Marina Efron & Carmen López-Areal	15 June 2022
8	8	"Changing Course" "Cambio de rumbo"	Juan Felipe Cano	Marina Efron & Carmen López-Areal	15 June 2022
9	9	"The Zoetrope is Spinning" "Gira el zoótropo"	Juan Felipe Cano	Marina Efron & Carmen López-Areal	15 June 2022
10	10	"Serendipity" "Serendipia"	Juan Felipe Cano	Marina Efron & Carmen López-Areal	15 June 2022

=== Season 2 (2024) ===
No. overall	No. in season	Title	Directed by	Written by	Original release date
11	1	"El reencuentro" "The Reunion"	Mónica Botero	Marina Efron & Carmen López Areal	17 January 2024
12	2	"Uno de nosotros" "One of Us"	Mónica Botero	Marina Efron & Carmen López Areal	17 January 2024
13	3	"Secretos" "Secrets"	Mónica Botero	Marina Efron & Carmen López Areal	17 January 2024
14	4	"Dime que no fuiste tú" "Tell Me It Wasn't You"	Mónica Botero	Marina Efron & Carmen López Areal	17 January 2024
15	5	"Lo sabías" "You Knew It"	Mónica Botero	Marina Efron & Carmen López Areal	17 January 2024
16	6	"¡Sorpresa!" "Surprise!"	Mónica Botero	Marina Efron & Carmen López Areal	17 January 2024
17	7	"Tormenta" "Storm"	Mónica Botero	Marina Efron & Carmen López Areal	17 January 2024
18	8	"Siempre fuiste tú" "It Was Always You"	Mónica Botero	Marina Efron & Carmen López Areal	17 January 2024

== Production ==
=== Background ===
In March 2020, it was reported that Disney+ had commissioned the musical thriller series It Was Always Me created and directed by Felipe Cano, with Leonardo Aranguibel and Cecilia Mendonça as producers.

The show was originally planned to star Tini Stoessel and Sebastian Yatra, but following their breakup they were replaced by Karol Sevilla and Pipe Bueno and the plot of the series was completely modified.

=== Filming ===
Filming of the series began in March 2021 in Cartagena and Bogotá and ended in May in Península de Barú.
