= Música en ti =

Soundtrack album by Soy Luna cast
- Released: 26 August 2016
- Recorded: 2016
- Genre: Pop
- Length: 37:07
- Label: Walt Disney

Soy Luna cast chronology
Soy Luna (2016)	Música en ti (2016)	La vida es un sueño (2017)

Singles from Música en ti
- 1. "Eres (Radio Disney Vivo)" Released: 15 July 2016; 2. "Valiente (Radio Disney Vivo)" Released: 15 July 2016; 3. "Alas (Radio Disney Vivo)" Released: 15 July 2016

Música en ti is the second soundtrack album of the series Soy Luna, titled Soy Luna: Música en ti (English: "Soy Luna: Music in You") was scheduled to be released on 26 August 2016.

The CD was recorded during the second part of the first season of the series, with songs recorded from the beginning, such as "A rodar mi vida". The CD was released in Latin America on 26 August, the same day that the first season of the series ended.

The title song is interpreted by the protagonist of the series, Karol Sevilla. The CD has other hits such as "Que más da", "Tengo un corazón", "Vuelo" and "Chicas así".

The CD includes songs from the first season of the serie, the opening, "Alas", performed by the protagonist Karol Sevilla live, as well as 2 other songs from the first CD (also live), "Eres" and "Valiente".

In Italy the CD was released with the title "Solo Tu", containing a bonus track that is a version of the song "Que más da", with excerpts from Italian and Spanish music.

== Track listing ==
Latin America edition
No.	Title	Writer(s)	Artist(s)	Length
1.	"Vuelo"	Eduardo Frigerio; Federico San Millán; María Florencia Ciarlo	Karol Sevilla; Ruggero Pasquarelli; Valentina Zenere; Michael Ronda; Malena Ratner; Agustín Bernasconi; Katja Martínez; Ana Jara; Jorge López; Chiara Parravicini; Gastón Vietto; Lionel Ferro; Carolina Kopelioff	3:11
2.	"Música en ti"	Federico Vilas; Mauro Franceschini	Sevilla	2:53
3.	"A rodar mi vida"	Fito Páez	Sevilla; Pasquarelli; Zenere; Ronda; Ratner; Bernasconi; Martínez; Jara; López; Parravicini; Vietto; Ferro; Kopelioff	3:16
4.	"Nada ni nadie"	Sebastián Mellino; Pablo Correa; Alejandro Vergara	Pasquarelli	3:34
5.	"Chicas así"	Frigerio; Millán; Ciarlo	Zenere; Ratner; Martínez	3:04
6.	"Tengo un corazón"	Frigerio; Millán; Ciarlo	Kopelioff	3:10
7.	"Qué más da"	Mellino; Correa; Vergara	Sevilla; Pasquarelli	3:03
8.	"Sin fronteras"	Mellino; Correa; Vergara	Sevilla; Kopelioff	2:32
9.	"Eres (Radio Disney Vivo)"	Mellino; Correa; Vergara	Sevilla; Pasquarelli; Ronda	2:33
10.	"Valiente (Radio Disney Vivo)"	Vilas; Franceschini	Sevilla; Ronda	3:25
11.	"Alas (Radio Disney Vivo)"	Frigerio; Millán; Ciarlo	Sevilla; Pasquarelli; Zenere; Ronda; Ratner; Bernasconi; Martínez; Jara; López; Parravicini; Vietto; Ferro; Kopelioff	3:28
12.	"A rodar mi vida (Acoustic)"	Fito Páez	Parravicini	2:49

Italian edition
No.	Title	Writer(s)	Artist(s)	Length
13.	"Solo Tu"	Mellino Correa Vergara	Sevilla; Pasquarelli	3:04

== Charts ==
=== Weekly charts ===
Weekly chart performance for Soy Luna - Música en ti
Chart (2016)	Peak position
Austrian Albums (Ö3 Austria)	24
French Albums (SNEP)	29
German Albums (Offizielle Top 100)	73
Portuguese Albums (AFP)	22
Spanish Albums (PROMUSICAE)	11

=== Year-end charts ===
Year-end chart performance for Soy Luna - Música en ti
Chart (2016)	Position
Spanish Albums (PROMUSICAE)	48
Chart (2017)	Position
Spanish Albums (PROMUSICAE)	100
