= Soy Luna (soundtrack) =

Soundtrack album by Soy Luna cast
- Released: 26 February 2016
- Recorded: 2015
- Genre: Pop
- Length: 38:43
- Label: Walt Disney

Soy Luna cast chronology
Soy Luna (2016)	Música en ti (2016)

Singles from Soy Luna
- 1. "Alas" Released: 15 January 2016; 2. "Sobre ruedas" Released: 19 February 2016

Soy Luna is the first album in a series of soundtracks. It was released on 26 February 2016.

The CD includes songs from the first season of the novel, the opening, "Alas", interpreted by the protagonist Karol Sevilla, in addition to other hits, "Valiente", "Prófugos", "Corazón", among others.

In Italy, The Netherlands and Germany the CD was released with bonus tracks with songs in other languages. Germany had also translated songs from further seasons on later CD's.

== Track listing ==
Latin America edition
No.	Title	Writer(s)	Artist(s)	Length
1.	"Alas"	Eduardo Emilio Frigerio; Federico San Millán; Florencia Ciarlo	Karol Sevilla	3:18
2.	"Valiente"	Federico Vilas; Mauro Franceschini	Michael Ronda	3:10
3.	"Eres"	Sebastián Mellino; Pablo Correa; Alejandro Vergara	Sevilla; Ronda	2:29
4.	"Prófugos"	Gustavo Cerati; Alberto Ficicchia	Ruggero Pasquarelli; Valentina Zenere	3:59
5.	"Un destino"	Frigerio; Millán; Ciarlo	Ronda; Gastón Vietto; Lionel Ferro	4:01
6.	"Sobre ruedas"	Vilas; Franceschini	Sevilla; Zenere; Malena Ratner; Katja Martínez; Ana Jara; Chiara Parravicini; Carolina Kopelioff	2:24
7.	"Corazón"	Jorge Serrano	Ratner; Agustín Bernasconi	3:10
8.	"Mírame a mí"	Mellino; Correa; Vergara	Zenere	2:25
9.	"I'd Be Crazy"	Jordan Mohilowski; Dan Ostebo	Pasquarelli; Ronda; Bernasconi; Jorge López; Vietto; Ferro	3:48
10.	"Siento"	Vilas; Franceschini	Pasquarelli	4:08
11.	"Invisibles"	Frigerio; Millán	Ronda; Vietto; Ferro	3:05
12.	"Camino"	Mellino; Correa; Vergara	Sevilla; Pasquarelli; Zenere; Ronda; Ratner; Bernasconi; Martínez; Jara; López; Parravicini; Vietto; Ferro; Kopelioff	2:49

Italian edition
No.	Title	Writer(s)	Artist(s)	Length
13.	"Tutto è possibile"	Frigerio; Millán; Ciarlo	Sevilla	3:19
14.	"Non arrenderti mai"	Vilas; Franceschini	Ronda	3:10

Dutch edition
No.	Title	Writer(s)	Artist(s)	Length
13.	"Niet te stoppen"	Frigerio; Millán; Ciarlo	Ridder van Kooten; Shalissa van der Laan	3:19

== Charts ==
=== Weekly charts ===
Weekly chart performance for Soy Luna
Chart (2016)	Peak position
Argentine Albums (CAPIF)	1
Austrian Albums (Ö3 Austria)	8
French Albums (SNEP)	6
German Albums (Offizielle Top 100)	20
Italian Compilation Albums (FIMI)	20
Polish Albums (ZPAV)	47
Portuguese Albums (AFP)	3
Spanish Albums (PROMUSICAE)	1

=== Year-end charts ===
Year-end chart performance for Soy Luna
Chart (2016)	Position
Spanish Albums (PROMUSICAE)	16

== Certifications ==
Region	Certification	Certified units/sales
Mexico (AMPROFON)	Platinum	60,000^{^}
Poland (ZPAV)	Gold	10,000^{‡}
Spain (PROMUSICAE)	Gold	20,000^{‡}
^{^} Shipments figures based on certification alone.^{‡} Sales+streaming figures based on certification alone.
