= Karol Sevilla =

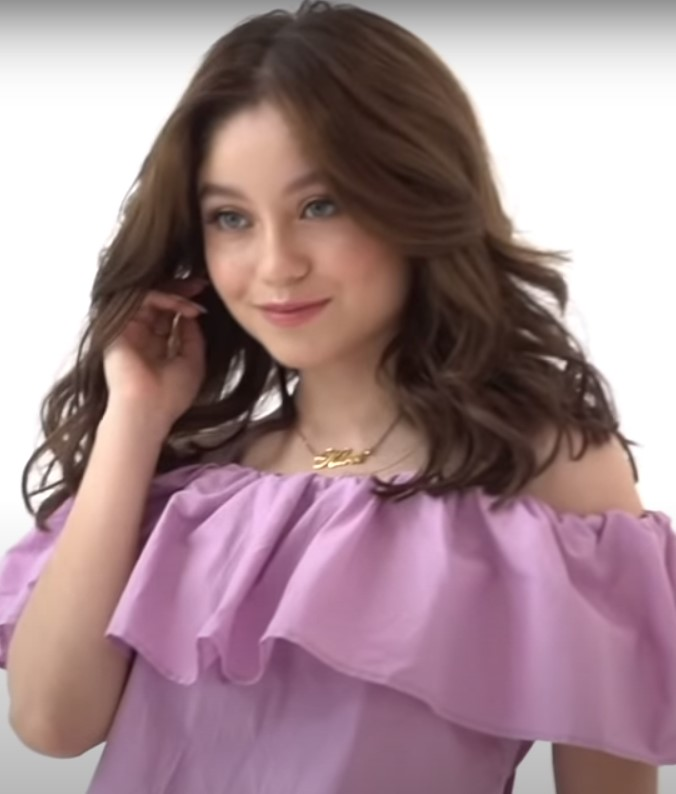
- Sevilla in 2021
- Born: Karol Itzitery Piña Cisneros; 9 November 1999 (age 26); Mexico City, Mexico
- Occupations: Actress; singer; songwriter
- Years active: 2006–present
- Musical career
- Genre: Pop
- Instrument: Vocals
- Labels: Walt Disney; OCESA Seitrack; TMBC Records

Karol Itzitery Piña Cisneros (born 9 November 1999), known professionally as Karol Sevilla, is a Mexican actress, singer, and songwriter. She is best known for playing Luna Valente in the Disney Channel series Soy Luna (2016–18). She also stars in the Disney+ Latin American series It Was Always Me, and Teresa Rondia in the film adaptation of Quite Like Paradise/Almost Paradise.

== Early life ==
Karol Itzitery Pina Cisneros was born on 8 November 1999, in Mexico City. She is the daughter of Carolina Cisneros and Javier Piña. Her parents divorced when she was a teenager. She has two brothers, one named Mauricio and another with Cerebral palsy named Angelo. During her childhood, Sevilla studied acting at Televisa's Center for Artistic Education in Mexico City and graduated from high school at the Colegio Militar de la Nación, located in Greater Buenos Aires, Argentina, in 2017.

== Acting Career ==
=== 2008–2014: Telenovelas and Theater ===
Her first television appearance was in 2008 in the Mexican telenovela ‘’Querida enemiga‘’ playing the role of Gina Liñán Mendiola. In 2009, she made a guest appearance in the television series Mujeres asesinas, as Cecilia.

In 2010, she appeared in the telenovela Para volver a amar, where she made a guest appearance. The following year, she joined the cast of the telenovela Amorcito corazón as María Luz.

In 2012, she appeared in the telenovela Qué bonito amor, playing Lucía. That same year, she appeared in the television series Como dice el dicho and in an episode of the fifth season of the anthology series La rosa de Guadalupe.

Alongside her television appearances, Sevilla stood out for her leading roles in musicals, including The Sound of Music, Anita the Little Orphan, Little Red Riding Hood, The Wizard of Oz, and Fantabulosa.

=== 2015–2019: Soy Luna and other projects ===
In May 2015, she was cast as the lead in the Disney Channel original series Soy Luna, playing the main role. The series quickly became an international hit, and her role in the show turned her into a teen idol and earned her worldwide recognition.

Following the conclusion of the Soy Luna: En Concierto, tour in December 2017, Walt Disney Pictures recorded the entire concert in Mexico to premiere it on the Disney Channel and on digital platforms under the title Soy Luna: En Concierto: Mexico. The film premiered on a pay-TV channel in Mexico, and the following month it was released worldwide on Disney's global platforms. It premiered simultaneously on Disney Channel Brazil under the title Soy Luna: O Show. The first trailer for Soy Luna 3: Una vuelta más; was shown during the film's broadcast, and on 24 November 2018, it was added to Netflix in Latin America and Brazil, but has since been removed to be included in Disney+’s catalog.

In 2017, she appeared on the Disney Channel television show Junior Express, and contributed to the soundtrack of the Disney and Pixar original film Coco (2017 film), performing the song “La bikina.

In 2018, Sevilla left her handprints at the Plaza de las Estrellas in Mexico City, a place where prominent figures have left their handprints in recognition of their achievements in Mexico as great artists.

In November 2018, Sevilla made her voice dubbing debut as Dani Fernández in the animated film Ralph Breaks the Internet and lent her voice to the song “El lugar” for the film's soundtrack and end credits.

In 2019, she served as a judge on the fourth season of the musical reality show Pequeños gigantes for Televisa. She also sang the show's opening theme song. That same year, she performed the song “Vuélveme a mirar así” for the soundtrack of the telenovela Soltero con hijas and served as a presenter for one of the categories at the 2019 Premios Juventud awards.

=== 2020–present: Acting projects, Almost Paradise ===
In November 2020, she hosted the 2020 Kids' Choice Awards Mexico, the 2020 Latin Grammy Awards, and the American Music Awards.

In February 2021, Sevilla returned to Disney screens once again for a new farewell film featuring footage from the final concert, intimate conversations with the actors, and a behind-the-scenes look to commemorate the acclaimed series. The film, subtitled Soy Luna: The Last Concert, premiered on 26 February 2021. Making it the company's second original production on the platform after Taylor Swift's Folklore: The Long Pond Studio Sessions.

In June 2022, she returned to work on another project for Disney, this time in the Disney+ streaming platform's web series It Was Always Me, playing María Guadalupe “Lupe” del Mar Díaz Mint.

In June 2024, it was confirmed that she would voice Victoria in the Latin American dub of the film Storm Crashers, and she also served as the film's executive producer.

In September of that year, she appeared in the film adaptation Almost Paradise, where she was part of the main cast, playing the role of Teresa Rondia.

On 23 October 2024, during an interview with Radio Disney, she confirmed that the series Soy Luna would return for a fourth season, which began filming in June 2025 and premiered on Disney+ in July 2026.

In January 2026, it was announced that she would return to musical theatre, playing Lupita in Mentiras, el musical.

== Music career ==
In 2016, alongside the premiere of Soy Luna, she began her music career by releasing cover songs on her YouTube channel.

That same year, she released her first original song, titled “Sonreír y Amar.”

In 2017, he was featured on the soundtrack for the movie Coco with the song “La Bikina.”

In 2018, she released her song “A Bailar,” which quickly became a trend, followed by songs such as “Mil Besos Por Segundo.” That same year, he contributed the song “El Lugar” to the soundtrack of the movie Ralph Breaks the Internet.

In 2020, she released “Vuélveme a mirar así,” a song that served as the theme song for the Mexican telenovela Soltero con hijas.

In 2021, she began her music career in earnest with the song “Tus Besos,” followed by “Nadie te entiende.” That same year, she released a collaboration with singer Joey Montana. She also released the song “Desde Hoy” as part of a Disney Princess campaign.

In 2023, it appeared on singer Mario Bautista's album “Fénix”, in the song “Anónimo,” which quickly gained popularity on social media.

She continued to release songs such as “Dime Dime,” “Miedo de sentir,” and “Salud Hermana,” and later in 2024 released the songs “Cenicienta,” “Otro Mood,” and “Una Noche Más,” which paved the way for her new phase as a singer.

In August 2024, she released “Weekend,” her first electronic song featuring the prominent Australian rapper, DJ, trumpeter, and record producer Timmy Trumpet.

In 2026, she released her debut album titled “Imperfecta,” in which she sought to leave behind her “Disney girl” image and show the world her true essence.

== Filmography ==
Film roles
| Year | Title | Roles | Notes |
|---|---|---|---|
| 2008 | Spam | Sofía | Supporting Cast |
| 2018 | Wifi Ralph | Dani Fernández | Voice role; Spanish dubbing |
| 2024 | Storm Crashers | Victoria | Voice role; Spanish dubbing |
| 2024 | Casi el Paraíso | Teresa Rondia | Main Role |

Television roles
| Year | Title | Roles | Notes |
|---|---|---|---|
| 2006 | Plaza Sésamo | Extra | Acting Debut |
| 2008 | Querida Enemiga | Gina Liñán Mendiola | |
| 2008–2015 | La Rosa de Guadalupe | Various roles | 11 episodes |
| 2009 | Mujeres Asesinas | Child Cecilia | Episode: "Cecilia, prohibida" |
| 2010–2011 | Para Volver a Amar | Monse | 4 episodes |
| 2011 | Amorcito Corazón | María Luz "Marilu" Lobo Ballesteros | Supporting Role; 2 Episodes |
| 2012–2014 | Como Dice el Dicho | Tatis - Renata | 2 Episodes |
| 2013 | Qué Bonito Amor | Lucía | |
| 2016–2018, 2026 | Soy Luna | Luna Valente | Lead role |
| 2017 | Junior Express | Angie | Special Guest; 1 Episode |
| 2019 | Pequeños Gigantes | Herself | Judge (season 4); 7 episodes |
| 2021 | Soy Luna: El Último Concierto | Luna Valente | Disney+ Documentary |
| 2022-2024 | Siempre Fui Yo | Lupe Díaz | Main Role; 18 episodes |

== Theater ==
| Year | Title | Roles | Notes |
|---|---|---|---|
| 2008 | La Novicia Rebelde | Gretel | Child character |
| 2010 | Timbiriche Musical | Herself | Singer |
| 2010-2013 | Anita la Huerfanita | Anita | Main role |
| 2012 | El Mago de Oz | Dorothy | Main role |
| 2014 | Fantabulosa | Fantabulosa | Main role |
| 2014-2015 | Caperucita Roja | Little Red Cap | Main role |
| 2026- | Mentiras, el musical | Lupita | Main role |

== Discography ==
=== Soundtrack albums ===
List of soundtrack albums, with selected details, chart positions and certifications
| Title | Soundtrack details | Peak chart positions | | | | | | | | Certifications |
| Title | Soundtrack details | ARG | AUT | FRA | GER | MEX | POL | PRT | SPA | Certifications |
|---|---|---|---|---|---|---|---|---|---|---|
| Soy Luna (with Soy Luna cast) | Released: 26 February 2016; Label: Walt Disney; Format: CD, digital download, streaming | 1 | 8 | 6 | 20 | 5 | 47 | 3 | 1 | AMPROFON: Gold; CAPIF: Platinum; PROMUSICAE: Gold; ZPAV: Gold |
| Soy Luna - Música En Ti (with Soy Luna cast) | Released: 26 August 2016; Label: Walt Disney; Format: CD, digital download, streaming | 1 | 24 | 29 | 73 | 10 | — | 22 | 11 | AMPROFON: Gold |
| La Vida Es un Sueño (with Soy Luna cast) | Released: 3 March 2017; Label: Walt Disney; Format: CD, digital download, streaming | 3 | 17 | 25 | 32 | 3 | — | — | 5 | AMPROFON: Gold |
| Soy Luna - Modo Amar (with Soy Luna cast) | Released: 6 April 2018; Label: Walt Disney; Format: CD, digital download, streaming | — | 28 | — | 67 | — | — | — | 18 | |
| Siempre Fui Yo (with Pipe Bueno and Siempre Fui Yo cast) | Released: 15 June 2022; Label: Walt Disney; Format: Digital download, streaming | — | — | — | — | — | — | — | — | |
| Siempre Fui Yo 2 (with Pipe Bueno and Siempre Fui Yo cast) | Released: 17 January 2024; Label: Walt Disney; Format: Digital download, streaming | — | — | — | — | — | — | — | — | |
"—" denotes a recording that did not chart or was not released in that territory.

=== As lead artist ===
List of singles as lead artist, with selected chart positions, showing year released
| Title | Year | Peaks | Album |
| Title | Year | MEX | Album |
|---|---|---|---|
| "Mil Besos Por Segundo" | 2019 | — | Non-album singles |
| "Vuélveme a Mirar Así" | 2020 | — | Non-album singles |
| "Coro de Amor (with Emilio) | 2020 | — | E2 |
| "Tus Besos" | 2021 | — | Non-album singles |
| "Nadie Te Entiende" | 2021 | — | Non-album singles |
| "Pase Lo Que Pase" (with Joey Montana) | 2021 | — | Non-album singles |
| "Dime Dime" | 2022 | — | Non-album singles |
| "Miedo de Sentir" | 2023 | — | Non-album singles |
| "Salud Hermana" (with Cielo Torres) | 2023 | — | Non-album singles |
| "Anónimo" (with Mario Bautista) | 2023 | — | Fénix |
| "Cenicienta" | 2024 | — | TBA |
| "Otro Mood" | 2024 | — | TBA |
| "Weekend" (with Timmy Trumpet and Faulhaber featuring Zorba) | 2024 | — | TBA |
| "Una Noche Más" (with Alan Navarro) | 2024 | — | TBA |
"—" denotes a recording that did not chart or was not released in that territory.

==== Promotional singles ====
List of promotional singles, showing year released and album name
| Title | Year | Album |
|---|---|---|
| "Alas" | 2016 | Soy Luna |
| "Sobre Ruedas" (with Valentina Zenere, Katja Martinez, Malena Ratner, Chiara Parravicini and Ana Jara) | 2016 | Soy Luna |
| "La Bikina" | 2017 | Coco (Banda Sonora Original en Español) |
| "Modo Amar" (with Soy Luna cast) | 2018 | Soy Luna - Modo Amar |
| "Soy Yo" | 2018 | Soy Luna - Modo Amar |
| "El Lugar" | 2018 | Wifi Ralph (Banda Sonora Original) |
| "Desde Hoy" | 2021 | Non-album promotional single |
| "La Canción Más Bonita" (with Pipe Bueno) | 2022 | Siempre Fui Yo |
| "No Pretendo Negar" (with Pipe Bueno) | 2024 | Siempre Fui Yo 2 |
| "Casi el Paraíso" | 2024 | Casi el Paraíso |

=== Guest appearances ===
List of other appearances, showing year released, other artist(s) credited and album name
| Title | Year | Other artist(s) | Album |
|---|---|---|---|
| "Dime Ven" | 2022 | Motel | Origen (En Vivo) |
| "Baila Asi" | 2024 | Pablo Borghi, Gonzalo Gutierrez | Gigantes / Storm Crashers |

== Tours ==
=== Headlining ===
- Que Se Pare el Mundo Tour (2018–2020)
- Luminova Tour (2024)

=== Co-headlining ===
- Soy Luna en Concierto (2017)
- Soy Luna Live (2018)
- Soy Luna en Vivo (2018)
- Soy Luna Tour - El Ultimo Show (2026)

== Awards and nominations ==
| Year | Award | Category | Work | Result | Ref. |
|---|---|---|---|---|---|
| 2016 | Kids' Choice Awards México | Favorite Actress | Soy Luna | Nominated | |
| 2016 | Kids' Choice Awards Colombia | Favorite Actress | Soy Luna | Nominated | |
| 2016 | Tú Awards | #Instagram Queen | Herself | Nominated | |
| 2016 | Kids' Choice Awards Argentina | Favorite Actress | Soy Luna | Won | |
| 2017 | Kids' Choice Awards México | Favorite Actress | Soy Luna | Nominated | |
| 2017 | Kids' Choice Awards Colombia | Favorite Actress | Soy Luna | Won | |
| 2017 | Eliot Awards México | Migrator | Herself | Nominated | |
| 2017 | Tú Awards | #Coolest Female Influencer | Herself | Nominated | |
| 2017 | Tú Awards | #Instagram Queen | Herself | Won | |
| 2018 | Kids' Choice Awards México | Favorite Actress | Soy Luna | Won | |
| 2018 | Kids' Choice Awards Argentina | Favorite Actress | Soy Luna | Won | |
| 2019 | Kids Choice Awards México | Favorite Actress | Soy Luna | Won | |
| 2021 | Kids' Choice Awards Mexico | Top Creator | Herself | Won | |
