= La vida es un sueño =

Soundtrack album by Soy Luna cast
- Released: 3 March 2017
- Recorded: 2016
- Genre: Pop
- Length: 40:20 (disc one); 41:52 (disc two)
- Label: Walt Disney

Soy Luna cast chronology
Música en ti (2016)	La vida es un sueño (2017)	Soy Luna Remixes (2017)

La vida es un sueño is the third soundtrack album of the Argentine telenovela Soy Luna, titled Soy Luna: La vida es un sueño (Life is a Dream) was scheduled to be released on 3 March 2017.

The album was published on the official Disney website by YouTube, and also by Vevo's music site.

On 27 February, the Claro Música app made available 30 seconds of each song for users. Days later, the release date was announced, this only available in Mexico.

The Latin American countries were the only ones that received the edition with two discs. In Europe and other countries, the albums were released separately, the first with the title Soy Luna (season two) – La Vida es un Sueño 1, and the second with the title Soy Luna (season two) – La Vida es un Sueño 2.

== Track listing ==
Disc one
No.	Title	Writer(s)	Artist(s)	Length
1.	"Siempre Juntos"	Maria Florencia Ciarlo; Federico San Milan; Eduardo Emilio Frigeiro	Karol Sevilla	4:17
2.	"Alzo Mi Bandera"	Maria Florencia Ciarlo; Federico San Milan; Eduardo Emilio Frigeiro	Michael Ronda; Gastón Vietto; Lionel Ferro	2:58
3.	"La Vida es un Sueño"	Maria Florencia Ciarlo; Federico San Milan; Eduardo Emilio Frigeiro	Sevilla	3:27
4.	"Fush, ¡Te Vas!"	Maria Florencia Ciarlo; Federico San Milan; Eduardo Emilio Frigeiro	Katja Martínez	3:09
5.	"¿Cómo Me Ves?"	Federico Agustin Vilas; Mauro Bruno Franceschini Campo	Valentina Zenere	2:02
6.	"Mitad y Mitad"	Maria Florencia Ciarlo; Federico San Milan; Eduardo Emilio Frigeiro	Agustín Bernasconi; Carolina Kopelioff	2:50
7.	"Valiente"	Federico Agustin Vilas; Mauro Bruno Franceschini Campo	Sevilla; Ruggero Pasquarelli; Zenere; Ronda; Malena Ratner; Bernasconi; Martínez; Ana Jara; Jorge López; Chiara Parravicini; Vietto; Ferro; Kopelioff	3:08
8.	"Honey Funny"	Federico Agustin Vilas; Mauro Bruno Franceschini Campo	Jara; López; Parravicini	2:27
9.	"Linda"	Maria Florencia Ciarlo; Federico San Milan; Eduardo Emilio Frigeiro	Ronda; Vietto; Ferro	3:43
10.	"Cuenta Conmigo"	Maria Florencia Ciarlo; Federico San Milan; Eduardo Emilio Frigeiro	Sevilla; Pasquarelli; Zenere; Ronda; Ratner; Bernasconi; Martínez; Jara; López; Parravicini; Vietto; Ferro; Kopelioff	3:31
11.	"Vives en Mí"	Federico Agustin Vilas; Mauro Bruno Franceschini Campo	Sevilla; Pasquarelli	2:55
12.	"I've Got a Feeling"	Sebastian Carlos Mellino; Pablo Nicolas Correa; Oscar Alejandro Vergara Becerra	Sevilla; Pasquarelli; Zenere; Ronda; Parravicini; Vietto; Ferro	2:40
13.	"Princesa"	Sebastian Carlos Mellino; Pablo Nicolas Correa; Oscar Alejandro Vergara Becerra	Pasquarelli	3:13

Disc two
No.	Title	Writer(s)	Artist(s)	Length
1.	"Footloose"	Dean Pitchford; Kenny Logins	Sevilla; Pasquarelli; Zenere; Ronda; Ratner; Bernasconi; Martínez; Jara; López; Parravicini; Vietto; Ferro; Kopelioff	3:13
2.	"Solo para Ti"	Maria Florencia Ciarlo; Federico San Milan; Eduardo Emilio Frigeiro	Sevilla	3:37
3.	"Catch Me If You Can"	Stefan Skarbek; Maria Florencia Ciarlo; Federico San Milan; Eduardo Emilio Frigeiro; Ariel Levitan; Jon Castelli	Zenere	3:18
4.	"Pienso"	Sebastian Carlos Mellino; Pablo Nicolas Correa; Oscar Alejandro Vergara Becerra	Ronda; Vietto; Ferro	3:39
5.	"Andaremos"	Sebastian Carlos Mellino; Pablo Nicolas Correa; Oscar Alejandro Vergara Becerra	Sevilla; Ronda	4:20
6.	"Allá Voy"	Ruggero Pasquarelli	Pasquarelli	3:07
7.	"No te pido mucho"	Maria Florencia Ciarlo; Federico San Milan; Eduardo Emilio Frigeiro	Sevilla	3:33
8.	"Stranger"	Jess Cates; Jordan Mohilowski; Dan Ostebo	Pasquarelli	3:12
9.	"Aquí Estoy"	Federico Agustin Vilas; Mauro Bruno Franceschini Campo	Pasquarelli; Bernasconi	2:32
10.	"Yes, I Do"	Bruno Martini; Mayra Arduini; Eduardo Camargo	Parravicini	3:21
11.	"Yo Quisiera"	Federico Agustin Vilas; Mauro Bruno Franceschini Campo	Ronda	3:42
12.	"Siempre Juntos (Group)"	Maria Florencia Ciarlo; Federico San Milan; Eduardo Emilio Frigeiro	Sevilla; Pasquarelli; Zenere; Ronda; Ratner; Bernasconi; Martínez; Jara; López; Parravicini; Vietto; Ferro; Kopelioff	4:18

== Charts ==
=== Weekly charts ===
Weekly chart performance for Soy Luna: La vida es un sueño – Season 2: 1
Chart (2017)	Peak position
Austrian Albums (Ö3 Austria)	17
French Albums (SNEP)	56
Italian Compilation Albums (FIMI)	8
German Albums (Offizielle Top 100)	32
Portuguese Albums (AFP)	50
Spanish Albums (PROMUSICAE)	5

Weekly chart performance for Soy Luna: La vida es un sueño – Season 2: 2
Chart (2017)	Peak position
Austrian Albums (Ö3 Austria)	15
French Albums (SNEP)	82
Italian Compilation Albums (FIMI)	20
German Albums (Offizielle Top 100)	57
Portuguese Albums (AFP)	25
Spanish Albums (PROMUSICAE)	8

=== Year-end charts ===
Year-end chart performance for Soy Luna: La vida es un sueño 1
Chart (2017)	Position
Spanish Albums (PROMUSICAE)	46

== Certifications ==
Region	Certification	Certified units/sales
Mexico (AMPROFON)	Platinum+Gold	90,000^{‡}
^{‡} Sales+streaming figures based on certification alone.
