= Ruggero Pasquarelli =

Italian singer, TV presenter and actor

Ruggero
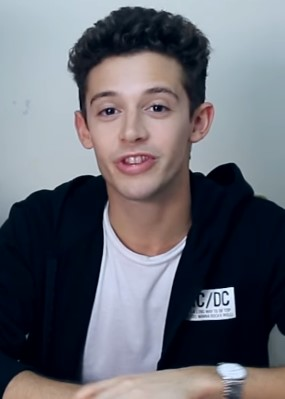
- Pasquarelli in 2016
- Born: 10 September 1993 (age 33); Città Sant'Angelo, Pescara, Italy
- Occupations: Singer; actor; TV presenter; dancer
- Years active: 2010–present
- Musical career
- Genres: Pop; latin
- Instrument: Vocals
- Labels: Walt Disney; Sony Argentina

Ruggero Pasquarelli (born 10 September 1993), known professionally by the mononym Ruggero (stylised in all caps), is an Italian singer and actor. In 2010, he took part in the fourth series of the Italian talent show X Factor, and is also known for his performance as Federico in the Argentine telenovela Violetta (2012–2015) and as Matteo Balsano in Soy Luna (2016–2018).

== Biography ==
=== Early life ===
Ruggero Pasquarelli was born in his house, Abruzzo, on 10 September 1993, to Bruno and Antonella Pasquarelli, and he grew up in Città Sant'Angelo, a town in the province of Pescara. As a child, he took guitar and acting lessons. In 2008, Pasquarelli started taking singing lessons, and since 2009 he also studied piano. He has a brother named Leonardo Pasquarelli. In high school, Pasquarelli studied at the pedagogical liceo, and specialized in Arts and Entertainment. While he was a high school student, he also became a singer of the local rock band 65013.

=== X Factor ===
In 2010, during his senior year of high school, Pasquarelli auditioned for the fourth series of the Italian version of British talent show The X Factor. As a result, he was chosen by Mara Maionchi as a member of the "Boys" category. During the seventh live show, Pasquarelli finished in the bottom two for the first time, together with Cassandra Raffaele, but only Raffaele's judge, Elio, voted to eliminate Pasquarelli, and he was therefore saved. He finished once again in the bottom two during the tenth live show. Pasquarelli was not allowed to perform during the final showdown, since he was 17 years old, and Italian laws don't allow performances of people under the age of majority after midnight. A pre-recorded performance was broadcast instead. The judges vote resulted in a deadlock, and the public vote saved Nevruz, and Pasquarelli finished the competition in sixth place.

X Factor series 4 performances and results
Episode	Theme	Song choice	Original artist	Result
Audition	Auditioner's choice	"A me me piace o' blues"	Pino Daniele	Advanced
Audition	Auditioner's choice	"Isn't She Lovely"	Stevie Wonder	Advanced
Bootcamp	Auditioner's choice	"Moondance"	Van Morrison	Advanced
Home Visit	Auditioner's choice	"Home"	Michael Bublé	Advanced
Live Show 1	Mentor's choice	"A me me piace o' blues"	Pino Daniele	Safe
Live Show 2	Mentor's choice	"The Great Pretender"	The Platters	Safe
Live Show 3	Mentor's choice	"Tu Vuò Fà L'Americano"	Renato Carosone	Safe
Live Show 4	Number-one songs	"Per te"	Jovanotti	Safe
Live Show 5	Mentor's choice	"Crazy Little Thing Called Love"	Queen	Safe
Live Show 6	1980s dance music	"You're the First, the Last, My Everything"	Barry White	Safe
Live Show 7	Italian hits of the 21st Century	"7000 caffè"	Alex Britti	Bottom two
Live Show 7	Final showdown	"A me me piace o' blues"	Pino Daniele	Saved by judges
Live Show 7	Final showdown – a cappella song	"Honesty"	Billy Joel	Saved by judges
Live Show 8	Songs from films	"Mambo Italiano"	Rosemary Clooney	Safe
Live Show 9	Mentor's choice	"Crocodile Rock"	Elton John	Safe
Live Show 10	Television theme songs	"Dove sta Zazà"	Gabriella Ferri	Bottom two
Live Show 10	Final showdown	"7000 caffè"	Alex Britti	Eliminated by public vote
Live Show 10	Final showdown – a cappella song	"Isn't She Lovely"	Stevie Wonder	Eliminated by public vote

=== Violetta ===
In 2012, Pasquarelli landed the role of Federico in the Argentine telenovela Violetta.

The first episode he appeared in was “An Approach, A Song” (season one, episode 56) until the series finale (season three, episode 80). He also took part in the European tour with all the cast.

=== Soy Luna ===
In 2015, Pasquarelli was cast as the male protagonist Matteo Balsano in the Latin American Disney Channel telenovela Soy Luna. From 2016 until 2018 he displayed his role in all three seasons, consisting of 220 episodes. He also took part in the three Live Tours in 2017 and 2018, playing shows in Latin America and Europe. In 2017, he released his first self-written song called 'Allá voy' on the Soy Luna Soundtrack. In 2018, he released his second self-written song "Esta noche no paro" on the Soy Luna Soundtrack as well.

=== Solo singing career ===
On 20 June 2019, he released his first single "Probablemente", followed by the second single, "No Te Voy a Fallar", released on 10 September 2019. In addition, he announced the Nuestro Tour, a small tour that took place between October and December of the same year around South America. Also in 2019 he collaborated with MYA, a duo of South American singers, on the single "Apenas Son Las 12".

In March 2020, he signed with Sony Music Argentina.

On 8 July 2020, he released his fourth single titled "Puede", and on 9 September of the same year, his fifth single titled "Bella" was released. On 9 October 2020, he collaborated with Tres Dedos on a new song titled "Por Eso Estoy Aquì". In the final months of 2020, he released two more singles: "Dos Extraños" on 19 November 2020, and "Mil Razones" on 17 December 2020.

On 24 April 2021, he announced that his self-titled debut album, Ruggero, would be released on 29 April 2021. On the month of the album's release, he released two other singles: "Úsame" with Dvicio on 1 April and "Si Tú No Estás" three days prior to the album's release. "Probablemente", "No Te Voy A Fallar" and "Apenas Son Las 12" were not included in the album.

The cover of "Senza una Donna" was released as single on 21 October 2021. On 7 June 2022, he released his second studio album, Volver a Cero, preceded by the singles, "Se Vive Solo una Vida", "Ya Fue" and "Nos Dejamos Enseguida" with Fabro.

=== Personal life ===
Since 2012, he resides and works in Buenos Aires, Argentina.

== Filmography ==
Year	Title	Role	Notes
2010	X Factor	Himself	Competitor (season 4); 6th place
2011	Social King	Himself	Presenter (season 2)
2011–2012	Cartoon Magic	Himself	Presenter
2011–2012	In Tour	Tom	Main role
2012–2015	Violetta	Federico Paccini	Recurring role (seasons 1–2); main role (season 3)
2013	Get the Party	Himself	Presenter
2016–2018, 2026	Soy Luna	Matteo Balsano	Lead role; 219 episodes
2016	Pijama Party	Himself	Special participation
2016	Un, Dos, ¡Chef!	Himself	Special participation (episode 3; season 3)
2019	Argentina, Tierra de Amor y Venganza	Víctor "Toro" de Leone	Main role (part 1)
2019	Argentina, Tierra de Amor y Venganza	Giancarlo de Leone	Recurring role (part 1)
2021	Soy Luna: El Último Concierto	Himself / Matteo Balsano	Disney+ special
2022	Supernova	June	Main role
2024	Cien Años de Soledad	Pietro Crespi	Main role
2026	Soy Luna: Volver a Rodar	Matteo Balsano	Second role

== Discography ==
=== Studio albums ===
List of studio albums and selected details
Title	Album details
Ruggero	Released: 29 April 2021; Format: CD, digital download, streaming; Label: Sony Music Argentina
Volver a Cero	Released: 7 June 2022; Format: CD, digital download, streaming; Label: Sony Music Argentina

=== Soundtrack albums ===
List of soundtrack albums, with selected details, chart positions and certifications
Title	Soundtrack details	Peak chart positions								Certifications
Title	Soundtrack details	ARG	AUT	FRA	GER	MEX	POL	PRT	SPA	Certifications
In Tour (with Martina Russomanno and Ariana Costantin)	Released: 21 September 2012; Format: CD, digital download, streaming; Label: Walt Disney	—	—	—	—	—	—	—	—	
Soy Luna (with Soy Luna cast)	Released: 26 February 2016; Label: Walt Disney; Format: CD, digital download, streaming	1	8	6	20	5	47	3	1	AMPROFON: Gold; CAPIF: Platinum; PROMUSICAE: Gold; ZPAV: Gold
Soy Luna - Música En Ti (with Soy Luna cast)	Released: 26 August 2016; Label: Walt Disney; Format: CD, digital download, streaming	1	24	29	73	10	—	22	11	AMPROFON: Gold
La Vida Es un Sueño (with Soy Luna cast)	Released: 3 March 2017; Label: Walt Disney; Format: CD, digital download, streaming	3	17	25	32	3	—	—	5	AMPROFON: Gold
Soy Luna - Modo Amar (with Soy Luna cast)	Released: 6 April 2018; Label: Walt Disney; Format: CD, digital download, streaming	—	28	—	67	—	—	—	18	
"—" denotes a recording that did not chart or was not released in that territory.

=== As lead artist ===
List of singles as lead artist, showing year released, with selected chart positions and album name
Title	Year	Peaks	Album
Title	Year	ARG	Album
"Probablemente"	2019	—	Non-album singles
"No Te Voy a Fallar"	2019	—	Non-album singles
"Apenas Son las 12 (featuring MYA)	2019	—	Non-album singles
"Puede"	2020	67	Ruggero
"Bella"	2020	—	Ruggero
"Por Eso Estoy Aquí" (with Tres Dedos)	2020	—	Non-album single
"Dos Extraños"	2020	—	Ruggero
"Mil Razones"	2020	—	Ruggero
"Úsame" (with Dvicio)	2021	—	Ruggero
"Si Tú No Estás"	2021	—	Ruggero
"Avventura" (with Astol)	2021	—	Amante
"Senza una Donna"	2021	—	Non-album single
"Se Vive Solo una Vida"	2022	—	Volver a Cero
"Ya Fue"	2022	—	Volver a Cero
"Nos Dejamos Enseguida" (with Fabro)	2022	—	Volver a Cero
"Vamos Pa la Playa" (with Oscu and Migrantes featuring Nico Valdi)	2022	—	TBA
"Morocha"	2023	—	TBA
"Mi una en 1M"	2023	—	TBA
"Cero Drama"	2023	—	TBA
"Serenata" (with Caztro)	2023	—	TBA
"Nico Valdi produciendo a Ruggero y Bernardita" (with Nico Valdi and Bernardita Sonzini)	2024	—	TBA
"ADN" (with Emanero)	2024	—	TBA
"Enamorado de Ti" (with Mar Lucas and Oscu)	2024	—	La Inocente
"Mil Kilos de Cemento"	2024	—	TBA
"No Me Gusta"	2024	—	TBA
"—" denotes a recording that did not chart or was not released in that territory.

=== As featured artist ===
List of singles as a featured artist, showing year released and album name
Title	Year	Peak chart positions	Album
Title	Year	ARG	Album
"Rescata Mi Corazón" (Manuel Wirzt featuring Ruggero)	2024	—	Non-album single
"—" denotes releases that did not chart or were not released in that territory.

==== Promotional singles ====
List of promotional singles, showing year released and album name
Title	Year	Album
"En Gira" (with Violetta cast)	2014	Violetta - Gira Mi Canción
"Modo Amar" (with Soy Luna cast)	2018	Soy Luna - Modo Amar
"You Are Not Alone" (International) (with Meredith O'Connor, Minzy, Reekado Banks, luliana beregoi, Di Ferrero, Kwaw Kese, Kodie Shane, Mary Wilson, Asees Kaur, Abbas Jaafar, Mackenzie Sol, Rebecca Black, Ar’mon&Trey, Syndee Winters, J3tt, Bedouine, Sound Sultan, Kim Se-hwang, Amanda Holley, Tvte and Maryse)	2021	Non-album promotional single
"Jodidamente" (with Migrantes)	2021	Sesión Acústica (Unplugged)

=== Guest appearances ===
List of other appearances, showing year released, other artist(s) credited and album name
Title	Year	Other artist(s)	Album
"A Me Me Piace 'o Blues"	2010	—N/a	X Factor 4 Compilation
"Tienes el Talento"	2012	Violetta cast	Violetta - Cantar es lo Que Soy
"Luz, Cámara, Acción"	2013	Jorge Blanco, Diego Domínguez, Facundo Gambandé, Samuel Nascimento, Nick Garnier and Xabiani Ponce de León	Violetta - Hoy Somos Más
"Esto No Puede Terminar"	2013	Violetta cast	Violetta en Vivo
"Hoy Somos Más"	2014	Violetta cast	Violetta - Il Concerto (Live)
"Tienes el Talento"	2014	Violetta cast	Violetta - Il Concerto (Live)
"Euforia"	2014	Violetta cast	Violetta - Il Concerto (Live)
"Luz, Cámara, Acción"	2014	—N/a	Violetta - Il Concerto (Live)
"Vieni e Canta"	2014	Lodovica Comello	Violetta - Il Concerto (Live)
"On Beat"	2014	Violetta cast	Violetta - Il Concerto (Live)
"Juntos Somos Más"	2014	Violetta cast	Violetta - Il Concerto (Live)
"Ser Mejor"	2014	Violetta cast	Violetta - Il Concerto (Live)
"Ser Mejor (Finale)"	2014	Violetta cast	Violetta - Il Concerto (Live)
"Rescata Mi Corazón"	2014	—N/a	Violetta - Gira Mi Canción
"Queen of the Dance Floor"	2014	Jorge Blanco, Facundo Gambandé, Nick Garnier and Samuel Nascimento	Violetta - Gira Mi Canción
"Friends´Till the End"	2014	Violetta cast	Violetta - Gira Mi Canción
"Crecimos Juntos"	2015	Violetta cast	Violetta - Crecimos Juntos
"Es Mi Pasion"	2015	Jorge Blanco, Facundo Gambandé, Nick Garnier and Samuel Nascimento	Violetta - Crecimos Juntos
"Llamame"	2015	Violetta cast	Violetta - Crecimos Juntos
"Solo Pienso en Ti"	2015	Jorge Blanco, Facundo Gambandé, Nick Garnier and Samuel Nascimento	Violetta - Crecimos Juntos
"Mas Que una Amistad"	2015	Jorge Blanco, Facundo Gambandé, Nick Garnier and Samuel Nascimento	Violetta - Crecimos Juntos
"Mi Princesa"	2015	Jorge Blanco, Facundo Gambandé, Nick Garnier and Samuel Nascimento	Violetta - Crecimos Juntos
"Mil Vidas Atras"	2015	Jorge Blanco, Facundo Gambandé, Nick Garnier and Samuel Nascimento	Violetta - Crecimos Juntos
"Alguien Más"	2022	Camilú	Que Me Duela
"El Corazón a Veces se Equivoca"	2024	Benja Torres	Espinas

== Tours ==
=== Headlining ===
- Nuestro Tour (2019)
- Volver a Cero Tour (2022–2023)

=== Co-headlining ===
- Violetta en Vivo (2013–2014)
- Violetta Live 2015 International Tour (2015)
- Soy Luna en Concierto (2017)
- Soy Luna Live (2018)
- Soy Luna en Vivo (2018)
- Soy Luna Tour - El Ultimo Show (2026)

== Awards and nominations ==
Year	Award	Category	Work	Result
2015	Kids' Choice Awards Argentina	Stunner	Violetta	Won
2016	Kids' Choice Awards Colombia	Favorite Actor	Soy Luna	Won
2016	Kids' Choice Awards Argentina	Favorite Actor	Soy Luna	Won
2016	Kids' Choice Awards Argentina	Viral Moment	Ruggelaria (shared with Candelaria Molfese)	Won
2017	Kids' Choice Awards Colombia	Favorite Actor	Soy Luna	Won
2017	Tú Awards	#El chico sexy	Soy Luna	Nominated
2017	Tú Awards	#La parejita más cute	Ruggero Pasquarelli and Asia Fazio	Nominated
