= Nickelodeon Colombia Kids' Choice Awards =

Nickelodeon Kids' Choice Awards Colombia
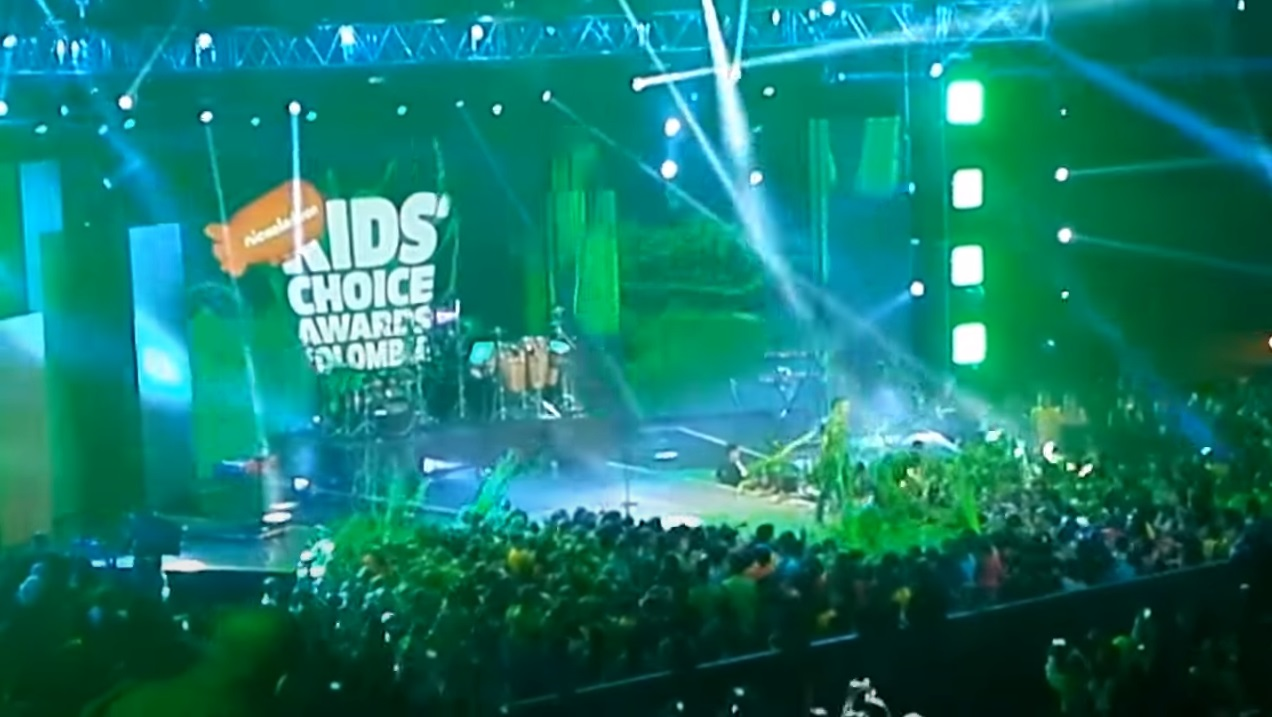
- Stage of the 2016 Colombia Kids' Choice Awards at Palacio de los Deportes
- Country: Colombia
- Presented by: Nickelodeon (Latin America)
- Reward: KCA Blimp
- First award: August 30, 2014
- Final award: September 30, 2017
- Website: http://kidschoiceawardscolombia.mundonick.com

Television/radio coverage
- Network: Nickelodeon (Latin America)
- Runtime: Approx. 90-120 min. including commercials

The Nickelodeon Kids' Choice Awards Colombia was the Colombian edition of Nickelodeon's Kids Choice Awards, held in Bogotá. In 2017 the awards took place on September 30, nominees were announced on July 19, 2017.

== Hosts ==
Date	Host(s)	Venue
August 31, 2013	Andrés Mercado	Pepsi Center WTC
August 30, 2014	Maluma	Corferias
August 29, 2015	Sebastián Villalobos; Tostao; Martina La Peligrosa	Corferias
September 10, 2016	María Gabriela de Faría; Mario Ruíz; Juan Pablo Jaramillo	Palacio de los Deportes
September 30, 2017	Andrea Serna, Sebastián Yatra	Chamorro City Hall

== Editions ==
Spanish-language editions of the Kids Choice Awards 2012–2013

In 2013, Nickelodeon held a new event, a Spanish version of the Kids’ Choice Awards in Mexico, which was viewable throughout greater Latin America. Depending on ratings, if the Mexican awards show met or exceeded network goals (which it was projected to), another Spanish-language Kids’ Choice Awards would subsequently be held in Colombia. This was also intended as an incentive to reward Colombia's young students, if they performed well academically (on a national level) in the school year 2012–2013. Ultimately, the popular Colombian sitcom on Spanish-language Nickelodeon, Chica Vampiro, would go on to win Personality of the Year (Colombian) and Best Musical Artist (Colombian). Other nominees included a diverse range of celebrities, from Alkylados, Linda Palma, Diego Saenz, to 21 bedroom, among others. The big winners were the musical group Alkylados and Olympic medalist Mariana Pajón. Given the excellent ratings, the Colombian network confirmed the Kids’ Choice Awards Colombia a second time, on 30 August 2014.

2014 edition

After a small test vote in the Kids Choice Awards Mexico 2013 in which some great results, and thanks to the support of the Colombian series Chica Vampiro upfront Nickelodeon Latin America 2014 held in the city of Bogota was confirmed by first time the awards Kids Choice Awards in Colombia and it was announced that it would be in the city of Bogotá and the date is already confirmed for August 30, 2014 in Bogota, and the award is fully confirmed.
