= Carolina Kopelioff =

Argentina actress, singer and model (born 1996)

Carolina Kopelioff (born 30 August 1996 in Buenos Aires) is an Argentine actress, singer and model, known for the role of Nina Simonetti in the Disney Channel series Soy Luna.

== Biography ==
She began her career at age 18 when she landed the role of Nina Simonetti in the telenovela Disney series Soy Luna along with Karol Sevilla, Valentina Zenere and Agustin Bernasconi.

== Filmography ==
Year	Title	Role	Notes
2016-2018	Soy Luna	Nina Simonetti	Main role
2019	El gran combo	Juliana	
2020	Twisting the Aces	Sofía	Main role
2020	La calor	Lola	Main role
2021	Soy Luna: El último concierto	Herself / Nina Simonetti	Disney+ special
2022	Supernova	Mimí	In production

== Award ==
- Best actress in the Nickelodeon Kids' Choice Awards Argentina.
