= Michael Ronda =

Mexican actor and singer

- Ronda in 2026
- Born: Michael Ronda Escobosa; 28 September 1996 (age 30); Mexico City, Mexico
- Occupations: Actor, singer
- Years active: 2009–present
- Height: 180 cm (5 ft 11 in)

Michael Ronda Escobosa (born 28 September 1996) is a Mexican actor and singer known for his role as Poncho in Como dice el dicho and Simón Álvarez in Soy Luna.

== Life and career ==
Ronda was born to father Davide Ronda, who is of Italian descent, and mother Vicky Escobosa, who is Mexican. He is the middle child between older sister Alessandra and younger brother Kevin. In 2011, he had many acting roles, such as Camilo in La fuerza del destino. He also starred in the feature films La Noche del Pirata and Bacalar, playing the roles of Dani and Santiago, respectively. He is better known for his role as Poncho in the television series Como dice el dicho. In 2016, he portrayed Simon Álvarez in the Disney Channel Latin America series Soy Luna. As of 2020, he portrays Javier Williams in the Netflix teen drama, Control Z.

== Filmography ==
Film and television roles
Year	Title	Role	Notes
2009	Cada quien su santo	Victor	Television series
2010	La fuerza del destino	Young Camilo	Television series
2010	''La noche Del Pirata''	Dani	Film
2010	Bacalar	Santiago	Film
2011—2015	Como dice el dicho	Poncho	Television series; lead role
2016—2018, 2026	Soy Luna	Simón Álvarez	Television series; main role
2018	Once	Simón Álvarez	Television series; guest role
2019	Bajo la red	Gabriel	Television series; main role (season 2)
2019	Bronco	Eduardo	Television series; recurring role
2020—2022	Control Z	Javier Williams	Television series; main role
2021	Soy Luna: El último concierto	Himself / Simón Álvarez	Disney + Special
2021	Luis Miguel: The Series	Diego Boneta	Cameo appearance (season 3)
2022—2023	Daddies on Request	Morgan	Web television series; main role
2022	Cuando sea joven	Víctor	
2024	Es por su bien	Fernando	Film
2024	Mi amor sin tiempo	Adrián de la Fuente	Telenovela; main role

== Discography ==
=== As lead artist ===
List of singles as lead artist, showing year released, with selected chart positions and album name
Title	Year	Peaks	Album
Title	Year	MEX	Album
"La Diva de la Escuela"	2018	—	Non-album singles
"Seré Tu Héroe"	2019	—	Non-album singles
"Tiempo"	2022	—	Cuando Sea Joven (Original Motion Picture Soundtrack)
"—" denotes a recording that did not chart or was not released in that territory.

== Awards and nominations ==
Year	Award	Category	Work	Result
2015	Kids' Choice Awards Mexico	Favorite Handsome	Himself	Nominated
2016	Kids' Choice Awards Mexico	Favorite Actor	Soy Luna	Nominated
2016	Kids' Choice Awards Colombia	Favorite Actor	Soy Luna	Nominated
2016	Kids' Choice Awards Argentina	Favorite Actor	Soy Luna	Nominated
2017	Kids' Choice Awards Mexico	Favorite Actor	Soy Luna	Won
2017	Kids' Choice Awards Argentina	Favorite Actor	Soy Luna	Won
2017	Tú Awards	#El chico sexy	Soy Luna	Nominated
2018	Kids' Choice Awards Mexico	Favorite Actor	Soy Luna	Won
2018	Kids' Choice Awards Argentina	Favorite Actor	Soy Luna	Nominated
