= Violetta en Vivo =

2013 concert tour

- Tour by Violetta
- Location: Europe; Latin America
- Associated album: Violetta (soundtrack); Cantar es lo que soy Hoy somos más
- Start date: 13 July 2013
- End date: 4 March 2014
- Legs: 2
- No. of shows: 199

Violetta concert chronology
- Violetta en Vivo (2013-2014); Violetta Live (2015)

Violetta en Vivo was the first concert tour by the cast of the Argentina Disney Channel television series Violetta, in support of the Violetta soundtrack discography. The tour began on 13 July 2013 with a residence of 77 concerts in Buenos Aires at Teatro Gran Rex and concluded on 3 March 2014 in Buenos Aires at Luna Park.

== Background ==
In 2013, an adaptation of the series as a theatrical show was confirmed. It was later announced that the show would premiere on July 13, 2013, at the Teatro Gran Rex in Buenos Aires. The show, titled Violetta en vivo, would run daily until July 28 of the same year at the same theater, with two performances per day, at 2:30 p.m. and 5:30 p.m. The performances were subsequently extended until September 15, with two shows per day, although no longer on a daily basis. Within less than a month of tickets going on sale, the show had sold 120,000 tickets. In total, 77 performances were held at the Gran Rex, with more than 250,000 tickets sold.

The tour was later extended across Latin America, where it achieved significant success, including sold out venues in Argentina and four shows in Uruguay. In Chile, approximately 70,000 tickets were sold across six dates , after the first two shows sold out, while the tour sold around 25,000 tickets in Brazil and nearly 40,000 in Mexico. In late 2013 and early 2014, the cast also travelled to Europe, performing in front of more than 150,000 fans in Spain and 160,000 in Italy.

== Cast ==
- Martina Stoessel as Violetta Castillo
- Jorge Blanco as León Vargas
- Diego Domínguez as Diego Hernández
- Mercedes Lambre as Ludmila Ferro
- Facundo Gambandé as Maximiliano "Maxi" Ponte
- Nicolás Garnier as Andrés
- Lodovica Comello as Francesca Caviglia
- Alba Rico as Natalia "Naty"
- Samuel Nascimento as Broduey
- Candelaria Molfese as Camila Torres
- Xabiani Ponce de León as Marco Tavelli
- Ruggero Pasquarelli as Federico (only for the Spain and 2014 concerts)

== Set list ==
=== Buenos Aires (2013) ===
1. "Hoy Somos Más"
2. "Tienes El Talento"
3. "Euforia"
4. "Habla Si Puedes"
5. "Podemos"
6. "Ahí Estaré"
7. "Are You Ready For The Ride?"
8. "Veo Veo"
9. "Voy Por Ti (acoustic version)"
10. "Voy Por Ti"
11. "Peligrosamente Bellas"
12. "Yo Soy Así"
13. "Cómo Quieres"
14. "Junto a Ti"
15. "Te Esperaré"
16. "On Beat"
17. "Juntos Somos Más"
18. "En Mi Mundo (capella)"
19. "Ser Mejor"
20. "Te Creo"
21. "En Mi Mundo (final)"

=== Latin American, Europe and Buenos Aires (2014) ===
1. "Hoy Somos Más"
2. "Tienes El Talento"
3. "Euforia"
4. "Habla Si Puedes"
5. "Podemos"
6. "Ahí Estaré"
7. "Are You Ready For The Ride?"
8. "Alcancemos Las Estrellas"
9. "Voy Por Ti (acoustic version)"
10. "Voy Por Ti"
11. "Nuestro Camino"
12. "Veo Veo"
13. "Peligrosamente Bellas"
14. "Entre Dos Mundos"
15. "Te Fazer Feliz"
16. "Yo Soy Así"
17. "Cómo Quieres"
18. "Junto a Ti"
19. "Tu Foto de Verano"
20. "Te Esperaré"
21. "On Beat"
22. "Juntos Somos Más"
23. "En Mi Mundo (capella)"
24. "Ser Mejor"
25. "Te Creo"
26. "En Mi Mundo (final)"

Notes

- In Italy, "En Mi Mundo" was performed in Italian as "Nel Mio Mundo".

== Shows ==
List of 2013 concerts, showing date, city, country, venue, tickets sold, number of available tickets, gross revenue and number of shows
| Date (2013) | City | Country | Venue | Number of shows | Attendance | Revenue |
|---|---|---|---|---|---|---|
| 13 July | Buenos Aires | Argentina | Teatro Gran Rex | 77 | —N/a | —N/a |
| 14 July | Buenos Aires | Argentina | Teatro Gran Rex | 77 | —N/a | —N/a |
| 16 July | Buenos Aires | Argentina | Teatro Gran Rex | 77 | —N/a | —N/a |
| 17 July | Buenos Aires | Argentina | Teatro Gran Rex | 77 | —N/a | —N/a |
| 18 July | Buenos Aires | Argentina | Teatro Gran Rex | 77 | —N/a | —N/a |
| 19 July | Buenos Aires | Argentina | Teatro Gran Rex | 77 | —N/a | —N/a |
| 20 July | Buenos Aires | Argentina | Teatro Gran Rex | 77 | —N/a | —N/a |
| 21 July | Buenos Aires | Argentina | Teatro Gran Rex | 77 | —N/a | —N/a |
| 23 July | Buenos Aires | Argentina | Teatro Gran Rex | 77 | —N/a | —N/a |
| 24 July | Buenos Aires | Argentina | Teatro Gran Rex | 77 | —N/a | —N/a |
| 25 July | Buenos Aires | Argentina | Teatro Gran Rex | 77 | —N/a | —N/a |
| 26 July | Buenos Aires | Argentina | Teatro Gran Rex | 77 | —N/a | —N/a |
| 27 July | Buenos Aires | Argentina | Teatro Gran Rex | 77 | —N/a | —N/a |
| 28 July | Buenos Aires | Argentina | Teatro Gran Rex | 77 | —N/a | —N/a |
| 2 August | Buenos Aires | Argentina | Teatro Gran Rex | 77 | —N/a | —N/a |
| 3 August | Buenos Aires | Argentina | Teatro Gran Rex | 77 | —N/a | —N/a |
| 4 August | Buenos Aires | Argentina | Teatro Gran Rex | 77 | —N/a | —N/a |
| 9 August | Buenos Aires | Argentina | Teatro Gran Rex | 77 | —N/a | —N/a |
| 10 August | Buenos Aires | Argentina | Teatro Gran Rex | 77 | —N/a | —N/a |
| 11 August | Buenos Aires | Argentina | Teatro Gran Rex | 77 | —N/a | —N/a |
| 15 August | Buenos Aires | Argentina | Teatro Gran Rex | 77 | —N/a | —N/a |
| 16 August | Buenos Aires | Argentina | Teatro Gran Rex | 77 | —N/a | —N/a |
| 17 August | Buenos Aires | Argentina | Teatro Gran Rex | 77 | —N/a | —N/a |
| 18 August | Buenos Aires | Argentina | Teatro Gran Rex | 77 | —N/a | —N/a |
| 23 August | Buenos Aires | Argentina | Teatro Gran Rex | 77 | —N/a | —N/a |
| 24 August | Buenos Aires | Argentina | Teatro Gran Rex | 77 | —N/a | —N/a |
| 25 August | Buenos Aires | Argentina | Teatro Gran Rex | 77 | —N/a | —N/a |
| 27 August | Buenos Aires | Argentina | Teatro Gran Rex | 77 | —N/a | —N/a |
| 30 August | Buenos Aires | Argentina | Teatro Gran Rex | 77 | —N/a | —N/a |
| 31 August | Buenos Aires | Argentina | Teatro Gran Rex | 77 | —N/a | —N/a |
| 1 September | Buenos Aires | Argentina | Teatro Gran Rex | 77 | —N/a | —N/a |
| 5 September | Buenos Aires | Argentina | Teatro Gran Rex | 77 | —N/a | —N/a |
| 6 September | Buenos Aires | Argentina | Teatro Gran Rex | 77 | —N/a | —N/a |
| 7 September | Buenos Aires | Argentina | Teatro Gran Rex | 77 | —N/a | —N/a |
| 8 September | Buenos Aires | Argentina | Teatro Gran Rex | 77 | —N/a | —N/a |
| 10 September | Buenos Aires | Argentina | Teatro Gran Rex | 77 | —N/a | —N/a |
| 11 September | Buenos Aires | Argentina | Teatro Gran Rex | 77 | —N/a | —N/a |
| 14 September | Buenos Aires | Argentina | Teatro Gran Rex | 77 | —N/a | —N/a |
| 15 September | Buenos Aires | Argentina | Teatro Gran Rex | 77 | —N/a | —N/a |
| 28 September | Asunción | Paraguay | Polideportivo del Club Sol de America | 2 | —N/a | —N/a |
| 29 September | Asunción | Paraguay | Polideportivo del Club Sol de America | 2 | —N/a | —N/a |
| 3 October | Santa Fe | Argentina | Estadio del Club Unión | 2 | —N/a | —N/a |
| 4 October | Santa Fe | Argentina | Estadio del Club Unión | 2 | —N/a | —N/a |
| 6 October | Rosario | Argentina | Metropolitano | 2 | —N/a | —N/a |
| 7 October | Rosario | Argentina | Metropolitano | 2 | —N/a | —N/a |
| 9 October | Neuquén | Argentina | Estadio Ruca Che | 2 | —N/a | —N/a |
| 11 October | Santiago | Chile | Movistar Arena | 2 | —N/a | —N/a |
| 12 October | Santiago | Chile | Movistar Arena | 2 | —N/a | —N/a |
| 13 October | Santiago | Chile | Movistar Arena | 2 | —N/a | —N/a |
| 16 October | Mendoza | Argentina | Arena Maipu | 2 | —N/a | —N/a |
| 17 October | Mendoza | Argentina | Arena Maipu | 2 | —N/a | —N/a |
| 19 October | Córdoba | Argentina | Orfeo Superdomo | 2 | —N/a | —N/a |
| 20 October | Córdoba | Argentina | Orfeo Superdomo | 2 | —N/a | —N/a |
| 21 October | Córdoba | Argentina | Orfeo Superdomo | 2 | —N/a | —N/a |
| 26 October | São Paulo | Brazil | Citibank Hall | 2 | 22,101 / 22,812 | $2,304,850 |
| 27 October | São Paulo | Brazil | Citibank Hall | 2 | 22,101 / 22,812 | $2,304,850 |
| 28 October | São Paulo | Brazil | Citibank Hall | 2 | 22,101 / 22,812 | $2,304,850 |
| 2 November | Montevideo | Uruguay | Teatro de Verano | 2 | —N/a | —N/a |
| 3 November (Note: The concerts were originally scheduled to take place on 1 November, 2013.) | Montevideo | Uruguay | Teatro de Verano | 2 | —N/a | —N/a |
| 6 November | Lima | Peru | Jockey Club del Perú | 1 | —N/a | —N/a |
| 8 November | Mexico City | Mexico | Auditorio Nacional | 1 | 35,286 / 38,384 | $3,103,585 |
| 9 November | Mexico City | Mexico | Auditorio Nacional | 1 | 35,286 / 38,384 | $3,103,585 |
| 10 November | Mexico City | Mexico | Auditorio Nacional | 2 | 35,286 / 38,384 | $3,103,585 |
| 13 November | Guatemala City | Guatemala | Domo Polideportivo Zona 13 | 2 | —N/a | —N/a |
| 15 November | Valencia | Venezuela | Forum de Valencia | 2 | —N/a | —N/a |
| 16 November | Caracas | Venezuela | Poliedro de Caracas | 1 | —N/a | —N/a |
| 16 November | Caracas | Venezuela | Poliedro de Caracas | 1 | —N/a | —N/a |
| 29 November | Barcelona | Spain | Palau Sant Jordi | 1 | —N/a | —N/a |
| 30 November | Barcelona | Spain | Palau Sant Jordi | 2 | —N/a | —N/a |
| 1 December | Barcelona | Spain | Palau Sant Jordi | 2 | —N/a | —N/a |
| 4 December | Bilbao | Spain | Bilbao Arena | 1 | —N/a | —N/a |
| 5 December | Bilbao | Spain | Bilbao Arena | 1 | —N/a | —N/a |
| 6 December | Bilbao | Spain | Bilbao Arena | 1 | —N/a | —N/a |
| 7 December | Madrid | Spain | Barclaycard Center | 2 | —N/a | —N/a |
| 8 December | Madrid | Spain | Barclaycard Center | 2 | —N/a | —N/a |
| 10 December | Seville | Spain | Palacio Municipal San Pablo | 2 | —N/a | —N/a |
| 12 December | Valencia | Spain | Pavelló Municipal Font de Sant Lluís | 2 | —N/a | —N/a |
| 13 December | Valencia | Spain | Pavelló Municipal Font de Sant Lluís | 1 | —N/a | —N/a |
| 14 December | Málaga | Spain | Palacio Jose Maria Martin Carpena | 2 | —N/a | —N/a |
| 15 December | Málaga | Spain | Palacio Jose Maria Martin Carpena | 2 | —N/a | —N/a |

List of 2014 concerts, showing date, city, country, venue, tickets sold, number of available tickets, gross revenue and number of shows
| Date (2014) | City | Country | Venue | Number of shows | Attendance | Revenue |
|---|---|---|---|---|---|---|
| 3 January | Milan | Italy | Mediolanum Forum | 1 | 227,625 (Note: According to Pollstar reports.) | $17,500,000 (Note: According to Pollstar reports.) |
| 4 January | Milan | Italy | Mediolanum Forum | 2 | 227,625 | $17,500,000 |
| 5 January | Milan | Italy | Mediolanum Forum | 2 | 227,625 | $17,500,000 |
| 6 January | Bologna | Italy | Unipol Arena | 2 | 227,625 | $17,500,000 |
| 10 January | Rome | Italy | PalaLottomatica | 2 | 227,625 | $17,500,000 |
| 11 January | Rome | Italy | PalaLottomatica | 2 | 227,625 | $17,500,000 |
| 12 January | Rome | Italy | PalaLottomatica | 2 | 227,625 | $17,500,000 |
| 15 January | Paris | France | Grand Rex | 2 | 227,625 | $17,500,000 |
| 17 January | Paris | France | Grand Rex | 2 | 227,625 | $17,500,000 |
| 18 January | Paris | France | Grand Rex | 2 | 227,625 | $17,500,000 |
| 19 January | Paris | France | Grand Rex | 2 | 227,625 | $17,500,000 |
| 21 January | Naples | Italy | PalaPartenope | 2 | 227,625 | $17,500,000 |
| 22 January | Naples | Italy | PalaPartenope | 2 | 227,625 | $17,500,000 |
| 23 January | Naples | Italy | PalaPartenope | 2 | 227,625 | $17,500,000 |
| 25 January | Catania | Italy | PalaCatania | 2 | 227,625 | $17,500,000 |
| 26 January | Catania | Italy | PalaCatania | 1 | 227,625 | $17,500,000 |
| 28 January | Padua | Italy | Kioene Arena | 2 | 227,625 | $17,500,000 |
| 29 January | Padua | Italy | Kioene Arena | 2 | 227,625 | $17,500,000 |
| 31 January | Florence | Italy | Nelson Mandela Forum | 2 | 227,625 | $17,500,000 |
| 1 February | Florence | Italy | Nelson Mandela Forum | 2 | 227,625 | $17,500,000 |
| 2 February | Turin | Italy | Pala Alpitour | 2 | 227,625 | $17,500,000 |
| 28 February | Buenos Aires | Argentina | Luna Park | 2 | 227,625 | $17,500,000 |
| 1 March | Buenos Aires | Argentina | Luna Park | 2 | 227,625 | $17,500,000 |
| 2 March | Buenos Aires | Argentina | Luna Park | 2 | 227,625 | $17,500,000 |
| 3 March | Buenos Aires | Argentina | Luna Park | 2 | 227,625 | $17,500,000 |
| 4 March | Buenos Aires | Argentina | Luna Park | 2 | 227,625 | $17,500,000 |
| Total | | | | | 57,387 / 61,196 (93.8%) (Note: According to Billbaord reports.) | $5,408,435 (Note: According to Billbaord reports.) |

=== Canceled show ===
List of canceled concert
| Date (2013) | City | Country | Venue | Number of show | Reason | Ref. |
|---|---|---|---|---|---|---|
| 13 December | Valencia | Spain | Pavelló Municipal Font de Sant Lluís | 1 | The partial collapse of a ceiling at the venue | |
