= Violetta Live =

2015 concert tour

- Tour by Violetta
- Location: Europe; Latin America
- Associated album: Various
- Start date: 3 January 2015
- End date: 1 November 2015
- Legs: 3
- No. of shows: 168
- Attendance: 1,049,323 (Note: According to Pollstar reports.) (145 shows reported)
- Box office: $76.8 millions (145 shows reported)

Violetta concert chronology
- Violetta en Vivo (2013-2014); Violetta Live (2015); Got Me Started Tour (2016-2017)

Violetta Live (written in full as Violetta Live 2015 International Tour) was the second and final concert tour by the cast of the Argentine Disney Channel Latin America television series Violetta, in support of its soundtrack discography albums. It began on 3 January 2015 in Madrid at Barclaycard Center and concluded on 1 November 2015 in Nice at Palais Nikaïa.

The series' main cast members Martina Stoessel, Jorge Blanco, Diego Domínguez, Mercedes Lambre, Candelaria Molfese, Alba Rico, Samuel Nascimento and Facundo Gambandé took part in the tour, with Ruggero Pasquarelli leaving the tour in March because of his cast as a male lead in Soy Luna (2016).

The tour was a commercial success with approximately gross over $80 million across its 167 concerts, making it the highest-grossing Latin tour of that year, and also one of the highest-grossing Latin tours of all time.

== Background ==
Following the success of the Disney Channel LATAM series Violetta and its previous first concert tour Violetta en Vivo (2013-2014), that had attracted more than 925,000 spectators across 27 cities in 12 countries, pursued the cast to enbreak on a new international concert tour in 2015. The official announcement of the tour was made on August 25, 2014, on the Italian website Bambini. The tour commenced on January 3, 2015, in Madrid, Spain. Its first Europe leg included performances across several countries, including Spain, Portugal, Italy, France, Belgium, the Netherlands, with the additional dates added in Switzerland, Germany and Poland. The production subsequently expanded into Latin America in April, visiting 24 cities across the region, before returning to Europe for second leg and final series performances in autumn 2015.

== Cast ==
- Martina Stoessel as Violetta Castillo
- Jorge Blanco as León Vargas
- Diego Domínguez as Diego Hernández
- Mercedes Lambre as Ludmila Ferro
- Ruggero Pasquarelli as Federico (only for the first European leg)
- Candelaria Molfese as Camila Torres
- Alba Rico as Natalia "Naty" Vida
- Samuel Nascimento as Broduey
- Facundo Gambandé as Maximiliano "Maxi" Ponte

== Set list ==
=== First European leg ===
1. "En Gira"
2. "Tienes El Talento"
3. "Euforia"
4. "Habla Si Puedes"
5. "Podemos"
6. "Are You Ready For The Ride?"
7. "Alcancemos Las Estrellas"
8. "Voy Por Ti (acoustic version)"
9. "Voy Por Ti"
10. "Underneath It All"
11. "Luz, Cámara, Acción"
12. "Código Amistad"
13. "Entre Dos Mundos"
14. "Peligrosamente Bellas"
15. "Veo Veo"
16. "Yo Soy Así"
17. "Supercreativa"
18. "Te Esperaré"
19. "Cómo Quieres"
20. "Ser Quien Soy (cappella)"
21. "On Beat"
22. "Juntos Somos Más"
23. "Soy Mi Mejor Momento (acoustic version)"
24. "Soy Mi Mejor Momento"
25. "En Gira (Final)"
26. "Te Creo"
27. "En Mi Mundo"

Encore

28. "Libre Soy"

Notes

- In Italy, "En Mi Mundo" was performed in Italian as "Nel Mio Mundo".

=== Latin America ===
1. "En Gira"
2. "Tienes El Talento"
3. "Euforia"
4. "Habla Si Puedes"
5. "Podemos"
6. "Are You Ready For The Ride?"
7. "Alcancemos Las Estrellas"
8. "Voy Por Ti (acoustic version)"
9. "Voy Por Ti"
10. "Underneath It All"
11. "Código Amistad"
12. "Entre Dos Mundos"
13. "Peligrosamente Bellas"
14. "Veo Veo"
15. "Yo Soy Así"
16. "Supercreativa"
17. "Te Esperaré"
18. "Cómo Quieres"
19. "Ser Quien Soy (cappella)"
20. "On Beat"
21. "Juntos Somos Más"
22. "Soy Mi Mejor Momento (acoustic version)"
23. "Soy Mi Mejor Momento"
24. "En Gira (Final)"
25. "Te Creo"
26. "En Mi Mundo"

Encore

27. "Libre Soy"

=== Brazil ===
1. "En Gira"
2. "Euforia"
3. "Habla Si Puedes"
4. "Abrázame y Verás"
5. "Te Fazer Feliz"
6. "Alcancemos Las Estrellas"
7. "Voy Por Ti (acoustic version)"
8. "Voy Por Ti"
9. "Underneath It All"
10. "Amor En El Aire"
11. "Código Amistad"
12. "Entre Dos Mundos"
13. "Peligrosamente Bellas"
14. "Veo Veo (capella)"
15. "Más Que Dos"
16. "Yo Soy Así"
17. "Supercreativa"
18. "Ven Con Nosotros"
19. "Cómo Quieres"
20. "Ser Quien Soy (cappella)"
21. "On Beat"
22. "Juntos Somos Más"
23. "Soy Mi Mejor Momento (acoustic version)"
24. "Soy Mi Mejor Momento"
25. "En Gira (Final)"
26. "Te Creo"
27. "En Mi Mundo"

Encore

28. "Libre Soy"

Encore

29. "Libre Soy"
30. "Crecimos Juntos"

=== Second European Leg ===
1. "En Gira"
2. "Tienes El Talento"
3. "Euforia"
4. "Habla Si Puedes"
5. "Podemos"
6. "Are You Ready For The Ride?"
7. "Alcancemos Las Estrellas"
8. "Voy Por Ti (acoustic version)"
9. "Voy Por Ti"
10. "Underneath It All"
11. "Código Amistad"
12. "Entre Dos Mundos"
13. "Peligrosamente Bellas"
14. "Veo Veo"
15. "Yo Soy Así"
16. "Supercreativa"
17. "Te Esperaré"
18. "Cómo Quieres"
19. "Ser Quien Soy (cappella)"
20. "On Beat"
21. "Juntos Somos Más"
22. "Soy Mi Mejor Momento (acoustic version)"
23. "Soy Mi Mejor Momento"
24. "En Gira (Final)"
25. "Te Creo"
26. "En Mi Mundo"

Encore

27. "Libre Soy"
- In Italy, "En Mi Mundo" and "Libre Soy" were performed in Italian as "Nel Mio Mundo" and "All'alba sorgero".

== Shows ==
List of concerts, showing date, city, country, venue, tickets sold, number of available tickets, gross revenue and number of shows
| Date (2015) | City | Country | Venue | Number of shows | Attendance | Revenue |
|---|---|---|---|---|---|---|
| 3 January | Madrid | Spain | Barclaycard Center | 2 | —N/a | —N/a |
| 4 January | Madrid | Spain | Barclaycard Center | 1 | —N/a | —N/a |
| 6 January | Zaragoza | Spain | Pabellón Príncipe Felipe | 2 | —N/a | —N/a |
| 10 January | Barcelona | Spain | Palau Sant Jordi | 1 | —N/a | —N/a |
| 11 January | Barcelona | Spain | Palau Sant Jordi | 1 | —N/a | —N/a |
| 14 January | Málaga | Spain | Palacio Jose Maria Martin Carpena | 1 | —N/a | —N/a |
| 15 January | Málaga | Spain | Palacio Jose Maria Martin Carpena | 1 | —N/a | —N/a |
| 17 January | Seville | Spain | Palacio Municipal San Pablo | 2 | —N/a | —N/a |
| 18 January | Seville | Spain | Palacio Municipal San Pablo | 1 | —N/a | —N/a |
| 23 January | Lisbon | Portugal | Altice Arena | 2 | 59,591 | $4,035,517 |
| 24 January | Lisbon | Portugal | Altice Arena | 2 | 59,591 | $4,035,517 |
| 25 January | Lisbon | Portugal | Altice Arena | 2 | 59,591 | $4,035,517 |
| 28 January | Turin | Italy | Pala Alpitour | 2 | —N/a | —N/a |
| 30 January | Milan | Italy | Mediolanum Forum | 2 | —N/a | —N/a |
| 31 January | Milan | Italy | Mediolanum Forum | 2 | —N/a | —N/a |
| 1 February | Bologna | Italy | Unipol Arena | 2 | —N/a | —N/a |
| 3 February | Florence | Italy | Nelson Mandela Forum | 2 | —N/a | —N/a |
| 4 February | Florence | Italy | Nelson Mandela Forum | 1 | —N/a | —N/a |
| 6 February | Rome | Italy | PalaLottomatica | 2 | —N/a | —N/a |
| 7 February | Rome | Italy | PalaLottomatica | 2 | —N/a | —N/a |
| 8 February | Rome | Italy | PalaLottomatica | 2 | —N/a | —N/a |
| 11 February | Lyon | France | Halle Tony Garnier | 2 | —N/a | —N/a |
| 12 February | Lyon | France | Halle Tony Garnier | 2 | —N/a | —N/a |
| 14 February | Toulouse | France | Zénith de Toulouse | 2 | —N/a | —N/a |
| 15 February | Toulouse | France | Zénith de Toulouse | 2 | —N/a | —N/a |
| 18 February | Paris | France | Zénith Paris | 2 | 55,999 | $4,846,835 |
| 19 February | Paris | France | Zénith Paris | 2 | 55,999 | $4,846,835 |
| 20 February | Paris | France | Zénith Paris | 2 | 55,999 | $4,846,835 |
| 21 February | Paris | France | Zénith Paris | 2 | 55,999 | $4,846,835 |
| 22 February | Paris | France | Zénith Paris | 2 | 55,999 | $4,846,835 |
| 24 February | Strasbourg | France | Zénith de Strasbourg | 1 | —N/a | —N/a |
| 25 February | Strasbourg | France | Zénith de Strasbourg | 2 | —N/a | —N/a |
| 27 February | Montpellier | France | Arena de Montpellier | 1 | —N/a | —N/a |
| 28 February | Montpellier | France | Arena de Montpellier | 2 | —N/a | —N/a |
| 3 March | Marseille | France | Le Dôme de Marseille | 2 | —N/a | —N/a |
| 4 March | Marseille | France | Le Dôme de Marseille | 2 | —N/a | —N/a |
| 7 March | Douai | France | Gayant Expo | 2 | —N/a | —N/a |
| 8 March | Douai | France | Gayant Expo | 2 | —N/a | —N/a |
| 11 March | Rotterdam | Netherlands | Ahoy Rotterdam | 2 | —N/a | —N/a |
| 13 March | Brussels | Belgium | Palais 12 | 1 | 42,159 | $3,711,723 |
| 14 March | Brussels | Belgium | Palais 12 | 2 | 42,159 | $3,711,723 |
| 15 March | Brussels | Belgium | Palais 12 | 2 | 42,159 | $3,711,723 |
| 18 March | Clermont-Ferrand | France | Zénith d'Auvergne | 2 | —N/a | —N/a |
| 21 March | Geneva | Switzerland | SEG Geneva Arena | 1 | —N/a | —N/a |
| 22 March | Geneva | Switzerland | SEG Geneva Arena | 2 | —N/a | —N/a |
| 26 March | Munich | Germany | Olympiahalle | 1 | —N/a | —N/a |
| 27 March | Munich | Germany | Olympiahalle | 1 | —N/a | —N/a |
| 29 March | Łódź | Poland | Atlas Arena | 2 | —N/a | —N/a |
| 17 April | Buenos Aires | Argentina | Tecnopolis Arena | 1 | —N/a | —N/a |
| 18 April | Buenos Aires | Argentina | Tecnopolis Arena | 2 | —N/a | —N/a |
| 19 April | Buenos Aires | Argentina | Tecnopolis Arena | 2 | —N/a | —N/a |
| 22 April | Montevideo | Uruguay | Estadio Gran Parque Central | 1 | —N/a | —N/a |
| 25 April | Bahia Blanca | Argentina | Club Midgistas South Stadium | 1 | —N/a | —N/a |
| 2 May | Resistencia | Argentina | Estadio Centenario | 1 | —N/a | —N/a |
| 5 May | Asunción | Paraguay | Jockey Club | 1 | —N/a | —N/a |
| 8 May | Córdoba | Argentina | Orfeo Superdomo | 2 | —N/a | —N/a |
| 9 May | Córdoba | Argentina | Orfeo Superdomo | 2 | —N/a | —N/a |
| 12 May | Salta | Argentina | Estadio Padre Ernesto Martearena | 1 | —N/a | —N/a |
| 15 May | Quito | Ecuador | Estadio Olímpico Atahualpa | 1 | —N/a | —N/a |
| 17 May | Guayaquil | Ecuador | Estadio Alberto Spencer | 1 | —N/a | —N/a |
| 20 May | Lima | Peru | Jockey Club del Perú | 1 | —N/a | —N/a |
| 22 May | Mexico City | Mexico | Auditorio Nacional | 1 | 38,107 / 61,723 | $1,964,425 |
| 23 May | Mexico City | Mexico | Auditorio Nacional | 2 | 38,107 / 61,723 | $1,964,425 |
| 24 May | Mexico City | Mexico | Auditorio Nacional | 2 | 38,107 / 61,723 | $1,964,425 |
| 27 May | Guadalajara | Mexico | Telmex Auditorium | 1 | 9,032 / 16,162 | $432,986 |
| 28 May | Guadalajara | Mexico | Telmex Auditorium | 1 | 9,032 / 16,162 | $432,986 |
| 30 May | Monterrey | Mexico | Auditorio Citibanamex | 2 | 10,220 / 13,890 | $579,927 |
| 3 June | Medellín | Colombia | Plaza de Toros La Macarena | 1 | —N/a | —N/a |
| 6 June | Bogotá | Colombia | Centro de Eventos Autopista Norte | 2 | —N/a | —N/a |
| 7 June | Barranquilla | Colombia | Romelio Martínez Stadium | 1 | —N/a | —N/a |
| 10 June | Panama City | Panama | Figali Convention Center | 1 | —N/a | —N/a |
| 13 June | Santo Domingo | Dominican Republic | Estadio Quisqueya | 1 | —N/a | —N/a |
| 16 June | Santa Cruz de la Sierra | Bolivia | Estadio Ramón Tahuichi Aguilera | 1 | —N/a | —N/a |
| 19 June | Mendoza | Argentina | Arena Maipu | 1 | —N/a | —N/a |
| 20 June | Mendoza | Argentina | Arena Maipu | 2 | —N/a | —N/a |
| 23 June | Tucumán | Argentina | Estadio La Ciudadela | 1 | —N/a | —N/a |
| 27 June | São Paulo | Brazil | Citibank Hall | 2 | 15,592 / 16,724 | $1,299,280 |
| 28 June | São Paulo | Brazil | Citibank Hall | 2 | 15,592 / 16,724 | $1,299,280 |
| 30 June | Rio de Janeiro | Brazil | HSBC Arena | 1 | 6,607 / 9,938 | $510,739 |
| 3 July | Santiago | Chile | Movistar Arena | 2 | 63,511 | $3,723,535 |
| 4 July | Santiago | Chile | Movistar Arena | 2 | 63,511 | $3,723,535 |
| 5 July | Santiago | Chile | Movistar Arena | 2 | 63,511 | $3,723,535 |
| 22 August | Warsaw | Poland | Stadion Narodowy | 1 | —N/a | —N/a |
| 25 August | Kraków | Poland | Tauron Arena | 1 | —N/a | —N/a |
| 26 August | Kraków | Poland | Tauron Arena | 1 | —N/a | —N/a |
| 29 August | Budapest | Hungary | Budapest Sports Arena | 2 | —N/a | —N/a |
| 30 August | Budapest | Hungary | Budapest Sports Arena | 2 | —N/a | —N/a |
| 2 September | Bucharest | Romania | Piața Constituției | 1 | —N/a | —N/a |
| 5 September | Vienna | Austria | Wiener Stadthalle | 2 | —N/a | —N/a |
| 6 September | Vienna | Austria | Wiener Stadthalle | 1 | —N/a | —N/a |
| 11 September | Verona | Italy | Verona Arena | 1 | —N/a | —N/a |
| 13 September | Pesaro | Italy | Adriatic Arena | 2 | —N/a | —N/a |
| 15 September | Paris | France | Zénith Paris | 1 | —N/a | —N/a |
| 16 September | Paris | France | Zénith Paris | 2 | —N/a | —N/a |
| 19 September | Nantes | France | Zénith de Nantes | 2 | —N/a | —N/a |
| 20 September | Nantes | France | Zénith de Nantes | 1 | —N/a | —N/a |
| 22 September | Bordeaux | France | Patinoire de Mériadeck | 1 | —N/a | —N/a |
| 23 September | Bordeaux | France | Patinoire de Mériadeck | 2 | —N/a | —N/a |
| 26 September | Stuttgart | Germany | Hanns-Martin-Schleyer-Halle | 2 | —N/a | —N/a |
| 27 September | Stuttgart | Germany | Hanns-Martin-Schleyer-Halle | 1 | —N/a | —N/a |
| 13 October | Berlin | Germany | Mercedes-Benz Arena | 1 | 11,553 / 11,553 | $832,263 |
| 17 October | Oberhausen | Germany | König Pilsener Arena | 2 | —N/a | —N/a |
| 18 October | Antwerp | Belgium | Sportpaleis | 1 | 13,125 / 15,455 | $977,839 |
| 20 October | Cologne | Germany | Lanxess Arena | 1 | —N/a | —N/a |
| 23 October | Hamburg | Germany | Barclaycard Arena | 1 | 20,466 / 23,660 | $1,411,950 |
| 24 October | Hamburg | Germany | Barclaycard Arena | 1 | 20,466 / 23,660 | $1,411,950 |
| 27 October | Frankfurt | Germany | Festhalle Frankfurt | 1 | —N/a | —N/a |
| 28 October | Frankfurt | Germany | Festhalle Frankfurt | 1 | —N/a | —N/a |
| 31 October | Nice | France | Palais Nikaïa | 1 | —N/a | —N/a |
| 1 November | Nice | France | Palais Nikaïa | 1 | —N/a | —N/a |
| Total | | | | | 124,702 / 169,105 (73.7%) | $8,009,409 |
