= Soy Luna season 2 =

Soy Luna
- Season 2
- Soy Luna season 2 promotional poster
- Starring: Karol Sevilla; Ruggero Pasquarelli; Valentina Zenere; Michael Ronda; Agustín Bernasconi; Malena Ratner; Katja Martínez; Jorge López; Ana Jara; Chiara Parravicini; Gastón Vietto; Lionel Ferro; Carolina Kopelioff; Estela Ribeiro; Lucila Gandolfo; Rodrigo Pedreira; Ana Carolina Valsagna; Roberto Carnaghi; Diego Alcalá; Germán Tripel; Antonella Querzoli; Ezequiel Rodríguez; Caro Ibarra; Paula Kohan
- No. of episodes: 80

Release
- Original network: Disney Channel Latin America
- Original release: Part 1: 17 April – 9 June 2017; Part 2: 7 August 2017 – 29 September 2017

Season chronology
- ← Previous; Season 1

The second season of the musical drama television series Soy Luna was ordered on 7 June 2016, and premiered on Disney Channel Latin America on 17 April 2017—previously scheduled for February 2017 — and concluded on 29 September 2017. This season consists of 80 episodes just like the previous season. The Show was broadcast from Monday to Friday at 18:00 Argentine time. Filming began in June 2016 and wrapped in February 2017. The official trailer dropped on 31 December 2016.

Like the previous season, this season it stars Karol Sevilla, Ruggero Pasquarelli, Valentina Zenere, and Michael Ronda as the titular characters. The season introduces several new cast members, including Estela Ribeiro and Roberto Carnaghi. Luz Cipriota, who used to star in the first season, was written off the series.

== Plot summary ==
The holidays are over and everyone returns home, a dream functions as a detonator of history, which will lead the protagonists to face new personal challenges, passions, feelings and the search and reaffirmation of one's identity.

Luna (Karol Sevilla) is on her way to revealing truth, while waiting, hopefully, for her reunion with Matteo (Ruggero Pasquarelli). But he comes back changed and reticent. No one knows the secret that Matteo hides. But Luna is ready to fight against wind and tide to discover it.

In his way Luna will help Matteo to discover his true passion and he will have to face the pressure of his demanding father. While in the mansion reigns a tense atmosphere, the arrival of Alfredo (Roberto Carnaghi) father of Sharon (Lucila Gandolfo) alters the routine and brings memories of the past. Luna feels a strong empathy for this funny and mischievous man, who looks so much alike. The relationship between the two, coupled with the help of Nina (Carolina Kopelioff), will mark a new personal path for Luna and help her investigate the mystery of her past. Vocational conflicts affect the group of the greatest. Ámbar (Valentina Zenere), Jazmín (Katja Martínez), Delfi (Malena Ratner), Gastón (Agustín Bernasconi) and Ramiro (Jorge López), who leave Blake South College, must decide which way to take on their journey towards adulthood.

Meanwhile, Matteo will debate between fulfilling the parental mandate, and pursue a prestigious career at the university, or choose what he really loves. Through Ramiro, he will discover a group of street skaters, "Los Adrenaline", who will guide him in the pursuit of his passion. Beyond school, the popularity of Jam & Roller continues to grow, and the track now has cameras streaming what happens there throughout the day. But an unforeseen event will change the plans and unleash a crisis that will force the whole team to work together. At the end of the road, Luna is about to discover a truth that will dramatically change her life forever.

== Cast ==
=== Starring ===
- Karol Sevilla as Luna Valente / Sol Benson
- Ruggero Pasquarelli as Matteo Balsano
- Valentina Zenere as Ámbar Smith
- Michael Ronda as Simón Álvarez

=== Also starring ===
- Malena Ratner as Delfina "Delfi" Alzamendi
- Agustín Bernasconi as Gastón Perida
- Katja Martínez as Jazmín Carbajal
- Ana Jara as Jimena "Jim" Medina
- Jorge López as Ramiro Ponce
- Chiara Parravicini as Yamila "Yam" Sánchez
- Gastón Vietto as Pedro Arias
- Lionel "Leo" Ferro as Nicolás "Nico" Navarro
- Carolina Kopelioff as Nina Simonetti
- Estela Ribeiro as Juliana / Marisa Mint
- Lucila Gandolfo as Sharon Benson
- Rodrigo Pedreira as Reinaldo "Rey" Guitierrez
- David Murí as Miguel Valente
- Ana Carolina Valsagna as Mónica Valente
- Roberto Carnaghi as Alfredo Benson
- Diego Sassi Alcalá as Tino
- Germán Tripel as Cato
- Antonella Querzoli as Amanda
- Paula Kohan as Mora Barza
- Ezequiel Rodríguez as Ricardo Simonetti
- Caro Ibarra as Ana Castro

=== Recurring ===
- Sebastián Villalobos as himself
- Samuel Do Nascimento as Santi Owen
- Thelma Fardin as Flor
- Gabriel Calamari as Xabi
- Julieta Nair Calvo as Paula
- Sheila Piccolo as Fernanda
- Sebastián Villalobos as himself
- Candelaria Molfese as Ada/Eva
- Roberto Ottini Ángelo Balsano

=== Special guest stars ===
- Sabrina Carpenter as herself
- Martina Stoessel as herself

== Episodes ==
No. overall	No. in season	Title	Original release date
Part 1
81	1	Episode 1	17 April 2017
A new year at Blake South College commences, and all the kids begin the new term with enthusiasm, although Luna continues to have weird dreams.
82	2	Episode 2	18 April 2017
Luna is frightened by the responsibility Tamara has left her, but she is confident that she is the perfect person for the job.
83	3	Episode 3	19 April 2017
Luna does not understand why Matteo is acting the way he is and feels like she does not recognize him anymore. Meanwhile, Nina searches for a reasonable explanation of what happened to her.
84	4	Episode 4	20 April 2017
Luna meets Alfredo, and they both have the feeling that they have met before.
85	5	Episode 5	21 April 2017
Luna does not understand what happened between her and Matteo, and believes that he has met another girl. Nina advises Luna to just talk to him and clarify everything. Meanwhile, Sharon and Rey make a shocking discovery that changes everything.
86	6	Episode 6	24 April 2017
Luna's performance is a success, and Simón is happy to have signed her up for the Open Music.
87	7	Episode 7	25 April 2017
Luna is ecstatic when she finds out that the grand finale of this year's skating competition will be held in Mexico.
88	8	Episode 8	26 April 2017
Luna is excited to tell her mother about the skating competition in Mexico, but her mother tells her that she can not travel to Mexico alone, and to calm down.
89	9	Episode 9	27 April 2017
Santi Owen tells the band that he saw Luna leave after the cameras broke, but Simón defends her.
90	10	Episode 10	28 April 2017
Luna does not understand what she hears Matteo say about her, but Nina thinks his feelings are obvious.
91	11	Episode 11	1 May 2017
Sharon asks Rey to get adoption papers for Ámbar, concocting a plan to make sure Luna never finds out that she is Sol Benson. Amanda overhears this, and is told to stay quiet.
92	12	Episode 12	2 May 2017
Luna and her friends refuse to believe that it is the end for Jam & Roller and believe that there is something they can do to fix the rink. Santi Owen is not as optimistic.
93	13	Episode 13	4 May 2017
Luna thinks Matteo is dating another girl.
94	14	Episode 14	4 May 2017
Sharon tells Amber that she is Sol Benson, she believes that what Sharon is saying is true, and her life changes radically. Luna knows a woman who knows the meaning of her mysterious necklace, and the gang has a plan to save the Jam and Roller.
95	15	Episode 15	5 May 2017
Luna tries to rebuild the Jam & Roller while still investigating the truth about her past, Sharon plans to announce to everyone in the mansion that Ambar is Sol Benson.
96	16	Episode 16	8 May 2017
97	17	Episode 17	9 May 2017
98	18	Episode 18	10 May 2017
99	19	Episode 19	11 May 2017
100	20	Episode 20	12 May 2017
Luna and her friends try to perform in the final Open Music at Jam and Roller, but they face more obstacles than they expected. Meanwhile, Amanda overhears a shocking conversation between Sharon and Rey about Ambar being Sol Benson.
101	21	Episode 21	15 May 2017
102	22	Episode 22	16 May 2017
103	23	Episode 23	17 May 2017
Luna and her friends meet Juliana, the new trainer for the Jam and Roller. Ambar tries to use Matteo to her advantage destroy Luna.
104	24	Episode 24	18 May 2017
105	25	Episode 25	19 May 2017
Luna and her friends are preparing to record the choreography for the competition, but something unexpected happens may put everything at jeopardy as Matteo fails Luna once again.
106	26	Episode 26	22 May 2017
Luna has concerns that the team cannot enter the competition all because of Matteo, and Luna hears a song from her past and gets emotional.
107	27	Episode 27	23 May 2017
Luna is mad at Matteo because of the video he and Ámbar made that makes fun of her, Meanwhile, Luna and Sebastián are getting closer.
108	28	Episode 28	24 May 2017
109	29	Episode 29	25 May 2017
110	30	Episode 30	26 May 2017
111	31	Episode 31	29 May 2017
112	32	Episode 32	30 May 2017
113	33	Episode 33	31 May 2017
114	34	Episode 34	1 June 2017
115	35	Episode 35	2 June 2017
116	36	Episode 36	5 June 2017
117	37	Episode 37	6 June 2017
118	38	Episode 38	7 June 2017
Luna continues with her investigation, but Rey has plans to sabotage it. Matteo makes a confession to Gastón and when Luna overhears the conversation, she is shocked.
119	39	Episode 39	8 June 2017
120	40	Episode 40	9 June 2017
Luna has a very special dream, that involves her necklace. Matteo decides to risk everything for love and does something romantic for Luna. The Roller Band is having problems getting along and must figure out whether to go their separate ways or stay a band. Luna finds a shocking clue, but in the midst of discovering it, something terrible happens.
Part 2
121	41	Episode 41	7 August 2017
122	42	Episode 42	8 August 2017
123	43	Episode 43	9 August 2017
124	44	Episode 44	10 August 2017
125	45	Episode 45	11 August 2017
126	46	Episode 46	14 August 2017
127	47	Episode 47	15 August 2017
128	48	Episode 48	16 August 2017
129	49	Episode 49	17 August 2017
130	50	Episode 50	18 August 2017
131	51	Episode 51	21 August 2017
132	52	Episode 52	22 August 2017
133	53	Episode 53	23 August 2017
134	54	Episode 54	24 August 2017
135	55	Episode 55	25 August 2017
136	56	Episode 56	28 August 2017
137	57	Episode 57	29 August 2017
138	58	Episode 58	30 August 2017
139	59	Episode 59	31 August 2017
140	60	Episode 60	1 September 2017
141	61	Episode 61	4 September 2017
142	62	Episode 62	5 September 2017
143	63	Episode 63	6 September 2017
144	64	Episode 64	7 September 2017
145	65	Episode 65	8 September 2017
146	66	Episode 66	11 September 2017
147	67	Episode 67	12 September 2017
148	68	Episode 68	13 September 2017
Alfredo tries to open the safe but Sharon arrives before he manages to open it. The roller team keeps practicing. Gary sees Ambar skate and likes it. Simon boasts and Gary challenges him to roller skating duel. Miguel goes to the nursing home and manages to steal the box. Richard arrives back in Buenos Aires.
149	69	Episode 69	14 September 2017
Miguel brings Luna the box and she finds a note mentioning the moon pendant. Richard and Ana discuss Nina's proposal to study abroad. Simon, Nico and Pedro are sleeping at the Jam n' Roller. Luna asks Sharon about Roberto Muñoz. Ambar prepares for her date with Simon. Gaston talks to Richard and Ana and tells them how much the study abroad program means to Nina. Roberto and Elena plan to open Sharon's safe. Gary shows the kids that he can skate, but Simon beats him. Gary then lets them stay in the loft. Sharon tells Miguel and Monica that she wants them back in Cancun. Luna sees the drawing that Tino & Cato found. Gary tells Juliana that he's now a partner in VIDIA.
150	70	Episode 70	15 September 2017
Luna dreams about her mom again. Luna sees the drawing that her mother made, and remembers it from her dreams. The girls band rehearses. Alfredo finds out that Ambar is not Sol.
151	71	Episode 71	18 September 2017
Simon and Ambar are kissing. Sharon almost catches Luna, Alfredo and Elena in cahoots. Alfredo is very upset that Sharon lied to him. Nina tries to decide between the study abroad and the roller program and talks to Richard about it. Alfredo asks the Valentes and Amanda for help. Tino and Cato are fired. Luna tells Simon about Ambar and going back to Cancun. Jazmin overhears Ambar and Simon make a second date. Simon tells Jazmin she's a great person, but he's not interested. She tells him to be careful with Ambar. While at Ambar's, Simon finds the scarf that is seen on the video when the fire started.
152	72	Episode 72	19 September 2017
Simon leaves Ambar's house without saying anything, then avoids Ambar on the phone. Gary is still set on having the roller team be the Red Sharks, and even gets them t-shirts. The kids refuse to wear them.
153	73	Episode 73	20 September 2017
Simón confronts Ambar about the scarf. Amanda tells Alfredo that Ambar knew the truth about Sol. Nina tells Gastón she is staying. Ambar tells Simón and Juliana that the fire was an accident, but denies breaking the glass skate. Juliana kicks her off the team. Alfredo offers Miguel and Monica a job at his home. Juliana calls Sharon and tells her that Ambar was responsible for the fire. Sharon tells Ambar she will not be going to Paris in punishment. Ramiro and Yaz tiptoe about their feelings. Alfredo confronts Sharon about her lies.
154	74	Episode 74	21 September 2017
Mateo continues moping over the lost record deal. He does not care about the skating competition. Sharon is spying on Rey. Ambar tries to join the Sliders. Pedro cannot believe that Delfi knew about Ambar's doings. Sharon tells Rey that Alfredo knows about the blackmail. Luna takes Mateo's moping very hard. Nina is moping about Gaston's leaving. Sharon makes a proposal to Miguel and Monica. Luna asks Alfredo if he knows how to contact Tino and Cato. When Luna mentions Roberto Muñoz, Alfredo has a flashback. Juliana confronts Mateo, who is still moping. She gives him an ultimatum. Ambar apologizes to Luna about the roller rink, while plotting her revenge.
155	75	Episode 75	22 September 2017
Luna sleepwalks dreaming of the fire in the mansion. Sharon finds her huddled in a corner and tries to convince her is due to stress over the exams and roller jam. Mateo talks to his dad and they come to an agreement. At the roller rink, Ambar manages to videotape part of the practice, which she then shares with the Sliders. Ambar decides to leave for Cancún right away.
156	76	Episode 76	25 September 2017
Alfredo figures out that Luna is Sol, but Sharon manages to get him locked up in asylum. Juliana decides to take all the kids to Mexico. Rey tells Sharon he's loved her for a long time. Ramiro and the others put pressure on Simon to write a new song for the roller jam. Sharon tells Rey she knows he's the blackmailer. Mateo apologizes to Gaston. Luna has the fire nightmare again while at Nina's house. Mora tries some word association game, and Luna calls out Sol, but Mora thinks it has to do with the fire. Ambar, Miguel and Monica arrive in Cancun. Luna manages to cheer up Simon. Luna and Mateo practice together. Emilia from the Sliders team is having a tweeting war with Jazmin. Jazmin sends her a clip of the team rehearsing to "show her how good they are." Of course, she gives away their secret dance number which they copy. Juliana comes up with a different routine. Alfredo tries to borrow a phone from another patient. He reaches Miguel, but then the nurse takes away the phone.
157	77	Episode 77	26 September 2017
Sharon has a flashback to the day of the fire, when she had an argument with Lily. They fought, which caused the fire. Sharon is found by Amanda in the kitchen in a bathrobe and unkempt. Luna and Mateo bicker while practicing. In Cancun, Ambar skates with the Sliders team. Juliana switches Mateo for Simon as Luna's skating partner. Jazmin records the new routine secretly. Monica and Miguel find a note in a book that shows that Sharon was in love with Bernie. Ambar overhears them. Sharon goes into Luna's room, where Amanda finds her. Jim is anxious, but Nico helps calm her down. Jazmin sends the second video. Luna can't find her necklace again. She goes to the mansion to look for it, where she runs into Sharon sitting in the dark.
158	78	Episode 78	27 September 2017
Sharon tries to find out how much Luna knows about her past. Luckily, Amanda walks in just as Sharon is getting really scary. Alfredo manages to get another phone, but Ambar answers the phone and she hangs up on him. She takes the batteries out the phone so he cannot call again. Jazmin posts the video on the blog so the sliders cannot claim the routing is theirs. Tino and Cato sneak into the mansion, just as Mora and Ana arrive to look for the necklace. The kids leave for Cancun, and Sharon decides to leave also. Luna and Simon run into Ambar in Cancun. Rey shows up at the mansion and takes stuff from the safe.
159	79	Episode 79	28 September 2017
160	80	Episode 80	29 September 2017
