= Soy Luna season 1 =

Soy Luna
- Season 1
- Soy Luna season 1 promotional poster
- Starring: Karol Sevilla; Ruggero Pasquarelli; Valentina Zenere; Michael Ronda
- No. of episodes: 80

Release
- Original network: Disney Channel Latin America
- Original release: Part 1: 14 March – 6 May 2016; Part 2: 4 July 2016 – 26 August 2016

Season chronology
- Next → Season 2

The first season of the musical drama television series Soy Luna premiered on Disney Channel Latin America on 14 March 2016, and concluded on 26 August 2016. This season consists of 80 episodes, divided in two parts of 40 episodes each. The show was broadcast from Monday to Friday at 18:00 Argentine time.

It stars Karol Sevilla as Luna Valente — A teenager with great talent in music and in skating who wants to become a world star, with Ruggero Pasquarelli, Valentina Zenere, and Michael Ronda as the titular characters.

The season recorded a total of 2.3 million viewers and in its last episode of the season a total of 5.3 million viewers, becoming the most watched Disney Channel show.

The first season of the series was made available on Netflix on 1 March 2017. However, on 1 January 2020, the season was re-released on Disney +, being fully removed from Netflix on 1 May 2020.

== Plot summary ==
Luna Valente (Karol Sevilla) is happy for the life above her skates. Just like any girl her age, she lives with her family, goes to school and has her group of friends. In addition, she has a job as a distributor at a fast food restaurant. Luna spends most of her time skating by the sea and listening to the songs composed by her best friend, Simón Álvarez (Michael Ronda). Her life takes an unexpected turn when her parents receive a proposal impossible to refuse: overnight, the Valente family must leave their beloved home and move to another country. Luna must adapt to a new life, new friends and a new school, where she finds a world of luxury and elite that she has little to do with. Luna takes refuge in her skates and, thanks to them, discovers a track of skating that offers a new universe on wheels.

== Cast ==
=== Starring ===
- Karol Sevilla as Luna Valente
- Ruggero Pasquarelli as Matteo Balsano
- Valentina Zenere as Ámbar Smith
- Michael Ronda as Simón Álvarez
- Malena Ratner as Delfina "Delfi" Alzamendi
- Agustín Bernasconi as Gastón Perida
- Katja Martínez as Jazmín Carbajal
- Ana Jara as Jimena "Jim" Medina
- Jorge López as Ramiro Ponce
- Chiara Parravicini as Yamila "Yam" Sánchez
- Gastón Vietto as Pedro Arias
- Lionel "Leo" Ferro as Nicolás "Nico" Navarro
- Carolina Kopelioff as Nina Simonetti

=== Also starring ===
- Luz Cipriota as Tamara Ríos
- Lucila Gandolfo as Sharon Benson
- Rodrigo Pedreira as Reinaldo "Rey" Guitierrez
- David Murí as Miguel Valente
- Ana Carolina Valsagna as Mónica Valente
- Diego Sassi Alcalá as Tino
- Germán Tripel as Cato
- Antonella Querzoli as Amanda
- Paula Kohan as Mora Barza
- Ezequiel Rodríguez as Ricardo Simonetti
- Caro Ibarra as Ana Castro

=== Recurring ===
- Sol Moreno as Daniela
- Tomás de las Heras as Mariano
- Thelma Fardin as Flor
- Gabriel Calamari as Xavi
- Samuel Do Nascimento as Santi Owen

=== Special guest stars ===
- Santiago Stieben as Arcade
- Sebastian Villalobos as himself
- Dani Martins as himself
- Sofia Carson as herself
- Mirta Wons as Olga
- Leo Trento as Willy Star

== Episodes ==
No. overall	No. in season	Title	Original release date
Part 1
1	1	Un sueño, sobre ruedas	14 March 2016
Luna loves roller skating and is lucky enough to have a part-time job where she can practice her hobby. But then the new boss of her parents gives an ultimatum: either the family follows her to Buenos Aires, or her parents are fired.
2	2	Una nueva historia, sobre ruedas	15 March 2016
Luna and her parents now live in the villa with their employer in Buenos Aires. Luna applies to be an assistant at the local roller skating rink, but she fails the skate test, because Ámbar and her friends tampered with her roller skates.
3	3	Nuevas aventuras, sobre ruedas	16 March 2016
Despite Ámbar's nasty sabotage attempt, Luna gets the job in the roller rink. But then her parents suddenly find out about the roller rink, and are worried that it will distract her from her studies at Blake South College. On her first day of school, Luna meets Matteo again, who seems to be interested in her.
4	4	Un secreto, sobre ruedas	17 March 2016
Rey tries to find out who called Sharon. Ámbar is confronted by Matteo, who is asking about Luna's accident, after which she feels surprised and betrayed by her friends.
5	5	Un amor, sobre ruedas	18 March 2016
To find out how much Nina has heard of their conversation, Ámbar, Delfina, and Jazmín flatter her, hoping for a confession. Jim and Yam prepare, at the last minute, their outfits for Open Music, but then coffee is spilled on one of the outfits.
6	6	Una oportunidad, sobre ruedas	21 March 2016
Freshly arrived in Buenos Aires to surprise Luna, Simón is looking for a place to stay. Meanwhile, Nina interviews Jazmín and Delfina, to try to find out who was to blame for Luna's accident.
7	7	Una verdad al descubierto, sobre ruedas	22 March 2016
Simón is suddenly locked in the Bensons' house. Meanwhile, Sharon and Rey finally find out who is behind the phone prank. Since Luna does not know who sabotaged her roller skates, she has doubts about joining the skating competition.
8	8	Una decisión, sobre ruedas	23 March 2016
By chance, Luna learns who tampered with her skates. Nina apologizes for not telling her the name of the culprit sooner. While Tino and Cato are trapped in the Benson House, Rey tries to interrogate them.
9	9	Un descubrimiento, sobre ruedas	24 March 2016
Ámbar does everything possible to prevent Luna and Simón from participating in the skating competition. Meanwhile, Delfina is sad because Gastón does not return her love. But when Delfina wants to partner with someone else in the skating competition, Gastón does a u-turn and becomes jealous.
10	10	Una rival, sobre ruedas	25 March 2016
Luna's parents find out that Simón is in Argentina to compete with her in the rollerskating competition. But shortly afterwards, an upcoming test and rising tensions between Jim and Yam complicate preparations for the competition.
11	11	Una competencia, sobre ruedas	28 March 2016
Up until the final moments of the competition, Luna is missing, which causes great panic. Nina eventually listens to her voicemail, and she learns that Luna is locked in a classroom back at school. But can Nina manage to get there in time to free her?
12	12	Un misterio, sobre ruedas	29 March 2016
Cato and Tino find Luna and Simón in the old cellar. Meanwhile, Ámbar and Matteo only place second in the skating contest, but for Ámbar it gets even worse, because she suspects that Matteo is meeting with another girl.
13	13	Un celoso, sobre ruedas	30 March 2016
Jazmín and Delfina try to tell Ámbar that Luna and Matteo are not having an affair. Nevertheless, blinded by jealousy, she takes revenge on Luna, by telling Luna's parents about her problems at school.
14	14	Un "casi" beso, sobre ruedas	31 March 2016
Luna has failed her test, and must now retake it. If she does not pass it, her parents will ban her from the roller rink. Ámbar sees this as an opportunity to get her long-awaited revenge on Luna, and swaps her test with one with incorrect answers.
15	15	Una duda, sobre ruedas	1 April 2016
Sharon is concerned that her niece is still alive, and asks Rey to investigate for her. Meanwhile, Ámbar's jealousy puts her relationship with Matteo at risk
16	16	Una mala nota, sobre ruedas	4 April 2016
Luna examines the suspicious circumstances in which she failed her test. Curious about Cato's gift to Amanda, Mónica tries to find out more. Meanwhile, the kids are preparing for the upcoming Open.
17	17	Un intercambio de pruebas, sobre ruedas	5 April 2016
Luna finds out that she did not pass the retest because Ámbar switched her test with one full of incorrect answers. As a punishment, Ámbar is given detention, so she will not be able to attend the upcoming Open Music. Because of this, Matteo must find another partner.
18	18	Una canción con Matteo, sobre ruedas	6 April 2016
Matteo presents Luna as his partner in the competition, and Ámbar is infuriated. Matteo and Simón have a showdown.
19	19	Un casi beso con... ¿Simón?, sobre ruedas	7 April 2016
Matteo wants to return with Ámbar. Felicity opens her own space, encouraged by Luna. Tino and Cato put Simón in trouble.
20	20	Un descubrimiento de Luna, sobre ruedas	8 April 2016
Ámbar agrees to skate again with Matteo. Mónica asks Amanda for the medal and discovers something important. Luna and Simón return to compete together.
21	21	Una medallita, un secreto, sobre ruedas	11 April 2016
Luna and Simón do not do well in the competition and Miguel also questions them about the belongings of Simon in the warehouse.
22	22	Un amor no correspondido, sobre ruedas	12 April 2016
Miguel almost discovers Simón. Sharon asks Rey to travel to Mexico to find information about his niece. Tamara gives a word to Luna that leaves her shocked.
23	23	Un amor por RollerTrack, sobre ruedas	13 April 2016
Luna and Simón are again in the competition after the disqualification of another pair, and Ámbar looks for a weak point to leave them outside.
24	24	Una decisión ¿la competencia ó Simón?, sobre ruedas	14 April 2016
Luna is left with no choice but to fulfil Ámbar's ultimatum, but will Simón have any say in the matter? Meanwhile, Delfina comes up with a devious plan to get Gastón to fall for her.
25	25	Una FelicityForNow mentirosa, sobre ruedas	15 April 2016
It's almost time for the "Boys vs Girls" Open Music! But will Ámbar succeed in getting rid of Luna? Meanwhile, Gastón falls for Delfina, but he doesn't realise that she is lying about being FelicityForNow. On a brighter note, a mysterious star comes to Jam & Roller!
26	26	Canciones y confusiones en el Open Music, sobre ruedas	18 April 2016
The third Open Music is about to kick off, but will Luna be ready in time? She has bigger problems to contend with however, because Ámbar is about to let the cat out of the bag and tell Sharon about Simón living in the basement. Meanwhile, Gastón starts getting suspicious about whether Delfina really is FelicityForNow.
27	27	Un nuevo hogar para Simón, sobre ruedas	19 April 2016
Simón is about to leave the cellar, but Sharon and Ámbar are nearly there. Will he get out in time? Meanwhile, Tino and Cato have a problem in Mexico, and Ricardo continues in his attempts to win Tamara over.
28	28	¿No se dio cuenta de qué te amo?, sobre ruedas	20 April 2016
The music video for "Mírame a mí" is filmed and premiered at Jam & Roller, and Nina finds out that she has an imposter. Meanwhile, Simón tries to get closer to Luna, while Sebastián is smitten with Ámbar, driving Matteo mad with jealousy.
29	29	Una confusión de sentimientos, sobre ruedas	21 April 2016
It seems like Ámbar and Matteo's relationship is over, but will their break-up last? Meanwhile, Luna suffers a setback in her training for the competition, and Nina makes a startling discovery.
30	30	Segunda fase de la competencia, sobre ruedas	22 April 2016
It's time for the next phase of the skating competition! Will Ámbar and Matteo keep their "King and Queen of the Rink" crowns, or will Simón and Luna get in their way? Meanwhile, Nina tries to stop Delfina's deceit in its tracks, and Jim and Nico argue over training difficulties.
31	31	Y la competencia continúa..., sobre ruedas	25 April 2016
It's time for the semi-final of the roller skating contest! Who will be the winner and make it to the final?.
32	32	Un celoso por Romeo y Julieta, sobre ruedas	26 April 2016
Delfi manages to stop Gastón from doubting her. Miguel discovers that Roberto worked in the mansion. Luna prepares for the final, but Ámbar has a plan.
33	33	Una documentación perdida, sobre ruedas	27 April 2016
Luna does not find the necessary documentation to travel to the final, and the confusion of roles makes her discover something very important.
34	34	Un viaje, sobre ruedas	28 April 2016
Luna and the team travel to the final of the competition. Gastón asks Delfi to help him with the lyrics of a song. Luna and Matteo are getting closer and closer.
35	35	¡La pista de mi sueño con Matteo!, sobre ruedas	29 April 2016
Luna and the team are amazed at the high level of competition. Gastón distrusts more and more of Delfi. Rey has a new track. Luna finds out something shocking.
36	36	Una confusión de parejas, sobre ruedas	2 May 2016
Simón goes out with a girl, and Luna has mixed emotions. Gastón and Delfi argue. Simón has an accident that makes him incapacitated for rehearsals.
37	37	El final de una relación, sobre ruedas	3 May 2016
Matteo learns that Ámbar went to Luna's interview. Sharon interrogates Mónica and Miguel about Roberto. Nina motivates Simon to tell Luna what he feels.
38	38	¿Qué sientes por mi?, sobre ruedas	4 May 2016
Luna and Simón are honest with each other. Ámbar has another intrigue in his hands. Mónica and Miguel decide to go with the jeweler who made the moon medal.
39	39	Un doble cambio en la final, sobre ruedas	5 May 2016
There is a tie in the competition of bands. Ámbar tricks Tino and Cato into taking Luna to a fake birthday party.
40	40	Un beso, sobre ruedas	6 May 2016
When leaving the hotel to go to the competition, Simón disappears, and Luna then decides to go looking for him. Meanwhile, at Jam & Roller, everyone gets together to watch the final. Luna and Matteo skate a crowd-pleasing performance of "Alas," and share a kiss. Gastón forgives Delfina, but prefers that they remain friends. Nina says goodbye to Xavi as he leaves to return to Brazil.
Part 2
41	41	Sentimientos, sobre ruedas	4 July 2016
Luna and Matteo are seen breaking apart from each other. Tamara cheers for them, jumping up and down and clapping her hands. Simón is seen watching them, upset from what happened. He is not moving and his facial expression stays the same as a few people walk in front of the camera. Luna and Matteo skate over to Tamara. Ámbar flips her hair and walks out. Ricardo cheers them, with Nina by his side. Tamara congratulates them, hugging them both. A camera man comes up to them and starts taking pictures of them as Simón walks out.
42	42	Una decisión muy apresurada, sobre ruedas	5 July 2016
Luna tries to convince Simón to stay, but he has already made a decision. Sharon and Rey argue, and Ambar realizes they're hiding something.
43	43	Un secreto que guardar, sobre ruedas	6 July 2016
Sharon and Rey receive the result of the DNA test. Ambar have a new plan to ruin Luna,who prepares a special surprise for Simón.
44	44	Una sorpresa, sobre ruedas	7 July 2016
Despite the surprise organized by Luna, Simón feels that something between them has broken. Matteo helps Luna indirectly.
45	45	Un Open Music random, sobre ruedas	8 July 2016
Luna asks Simón to participate in the competition with her. Ricardo is annoyed by Mariano's insistence on Tamara.
46	46	¿Un amor o una amistad?, sobre ruedas	11 July 2016
Simón decides to stay in Argentina. A valuable item disappears from the mansion, and Sharon orders the dismissal of the person in charge.
47	47	Un mal entendido, sobre ruedas	12 July 2016
Simón is surprised by the arrival of Daniela, a girl he met in Cancun. Miguel tries to explain to Rey that he did not steal the swan.
48	48	Un despido, sobre ruedas	13 July 2016
Luna discovers that her parents have been dismissed from the mansion and become very upset. Mariano gets an instructor job to get close to Tamara.
49	49	Celos por Simón, sobre ruedas	14 July 2016
Ambar mind over what happened to the swan, but Sharon discovers and apologizes to Monica and Miguel. Matteo decides to surprise Luna.
50	50	Encuentros, sobre ruedas	15 July 2016
Matteo is joining Luna's team for the competition. Ambar flees to go to training, but is found by Rey. Luna makes an important discovery. Nina meets Xabi, a Brazilian art painter who is portrayed by Gabriel Calamari.
51	51	¡Se besaban!, sobre ruedas	18 July 2016
Luna sees Simon with Daniela. Nina will meet RollerTrack and decide not to reveal her identity.
52	52	Nuevos amores, sobre ruedas	19 July 2016
Tamara sees the choreography the team has created and changes their decision. Luna is worried about Simón because she thinks that Daniela is not who she seems to be.
53	53	Un pendrive pérdido, sobre ruedas	20 July 2016
Luna asks Tamara for more time to get the missing element on the team and loses something important to Simon.
54	54	Un plan, sobre ruedas	21 July 2016
Simon is disappointed with Luna. Ambar's team are doing very well, but Luna's team faces some difficulties. Daniela makes a terrible revelation.
55	55	Lo que siento, sobre ruedas	22 July 2016
Luna confronts Daniela, who becomes a victim and denies everything. Gastón presents his song to Felicity, and Nina is moved to hear it.
56	56	¿Matteo ó Simón?, sobre ruedas	25 July 2016
Matteo presents his song to Luna, who does not realize that it was made in his honor. Luna waits for Simon to give him his song.
57	57	Una verdad casí revelada, sobre ruedas	26 July 2016
Daniela continues to conspire against Luna. Gastón tells Nina that they are about to find out who Felicity is.
58	58	Una mentira, sobre ruedas	27 July 2016
Daniela convinces Luna to move away from Simon. Nina is about to confess her identity to Gastón and has a joint plan with Luna to unmask Daniela.
59	59	Un "juego" de amor, sobre ruedas	28 July 2016
Luna decides to show the video of Daniela to Simón. Tamara agrees to be Mariano's partner in the competition.
60	60	Confusión en la competencia, sobre ruedas	29 July 2016
Luna is looking forward to the competition. Rey and Sharon review the files that came from Mexico. The winning team will represent Jam & Roller in the regional final.
61	61	Un nuevo amor, sobre ruedas	1 August 2016
After seeing Luna and Simón together, Matteo feels hurt and confused. The king and queen of skating are together again.
62	62	Novios, sobre ruedas	2 August 2016
Luna talks to Miguel about the woman in his dream. Mariano is very demanding in training for the regional final.
63	63	Confusiones en la mansión, sobre ruedas	3 August 2016
Young people await the results of the competition. Luna lends clothes to Nina, which is unrecognizable. RollerTrack and FelicityForNow talk to the webcam.
64	64	¿Quién es FelicityForNow?, sobre ruedas	4 August 2016
Matteo and Gastón want to know if Luna is friends with Felicity. Simón thinks that Luna is hiding something, but that she does not want to betray her friend
65	65	Open Music: chicos vs chicas, sobre ruedas	5 August 2016
Ambar tells Simon that Luna is in love with Matteo. Mariano convinces Tamara that he will help the team.Samuel Nascimento is Santi Owen, a famous Brazilian manager who watches the shows of the boys and the girls in the Open Music:Boys VS Girls.
66	66	Una propuesta, sobre ruedas	8 August 2016
The young people believe that Mora is Felicity. Tamara announces that Jam & Roller will host the intercontinental competition.
67	67	¿Qué siento por Matteo?, sobre ruedas	9 August 2016
Luna needs to make a decision: accept the offer of another team or stay with Jam & Roller.
68	68	Una nueva formación del equipo, sobre ruedas	10 August 2016
The young people want Luna to join the Jam & Roller team. Ambar is offended when Matteo defends Luna.
69	69	¿Un novío o un amigo?, sobre ruedas	11 August 2016
Luna is confused about her feelings for Simon. Mariano makes an offer to Jim and Ramiro. Luna has a revealing dream about her past.
70	70	¿Surge el amor?, sobre ruedas	12 August 2016
Luna can not stop thinking about the dream she had. Miguel tries to help her and makes an amazing discovery.
71	71	Una visita especial, sobre ruedas	15 August 2016
Luna thinks that Simon's decision will forever affect the friendship between them. Matteo approaches Luna, and Gastón de Nina. Sofia Carson sings with Luna and leaves Ambar jealous.
72	72	Un trabajo perdido, sobre ruedas	16 August 2016
Luna runs the risk of not participating in the intercontinental competition. Tino and Cato have an important object in hand. After Mora asks Sofia Carson to come to Jam & Roller, the special visit is another day before leaving.
73	73	Una fiesta de cumpleaños, sobre ruedas	17 August 2016
On Ambar's birthday, a surprise guest tries to approach her. Gastón is about to find out who FelicityForNow is.
74	74	Miedo de enamorarse, sobre ruedas	18 August 2016
Felicity announces that she will give a presentation. Ambar finds a special gift left by the mysterious woman.
75	75	Un Open Music de revelaciones, sobre ruedas	19 August 2016
Mariano reveals his true nature to Tamara. Felicity does her show, and Ambar has a plan to unmask her.
76	76	Yo soy FelicityForNow, sobre ruedas	22 August 2016
Ambar tries to separate Nina and Gaston. The Jam & Roller team loses two members because of Mariano's maneuvers. Luna receives unpleasant news.
77	77	Una verdad que puede cambiarlo todo, sobre ruedas	23 August 2016
Luna tries to convince her parents to let her train. Nina and Gastón end up walking away.
78	78	Una decisión amorosa, sobre ruedas	24 August 2016
Luna needs to finish her job on time or she will not be able to participate in the competition. Matteo needs to know what she feels for him.
79	79	La final de la InterContinental, sobre ruedas: Part 1	25 August 2016
Luna has a dream that helps her deal with the competition and her feelings for Matteo. Young people have a plan, but Ambar also has a plan.
80	80	La final de la InterContinental, sobre ruedas: Part 2	26 August 2016
It's time for the intercontinental competition and the Roller Band show.
