= Lodovica Comello =

Italian actress and singer (born 1990)

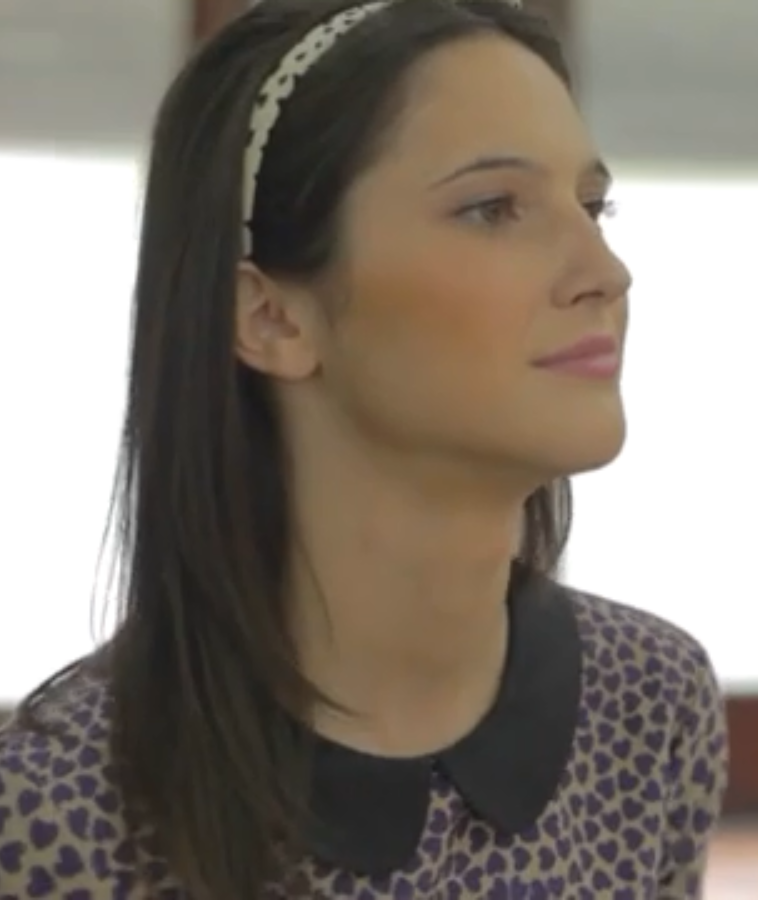
- Comello in 2013
- Born: 13 April 1990 (age 36); San Daniele del Friuli, Udine, Italy
- Occupations: Actress; singer; television presenter; radio speaker; dancer
- Years active: 2008–present
- Spouse: Tomas Goldschmidt (m. 2015)
- Children: 1
- Musical career
- Genres: Pop; dance-pop
- Instrument: Vocals
- Labels: Walt Disney; Sony Italy
- Website: lodovicacomello.com

Lodovica Comello (born 13 April 1990) is an Italian actress, television presenter, singer and dancer. She gained international popularity for her role as Francesca in the Argentine Disney Channel series Violetta.

== Early life ==
Comello was born and raised in San Daniele del Friuli near Udine in Friuli. She demonstrated her passion for art, acting, dance, guitar from a very young age, and started guitar lessons at age 8. In high school, she studied music theory, and participated in dance and acting in her spare time. She attended I.S.I.S. Superiore Vincenzo Manzini, a public high school in San Daniele del Friuli. During her time at school, she won a science writing contest and was awarded a trip to Austria. She graduated high school in 2008. After completing her high school studies, she auditioned for and later took courses in music at M.A.S.: Music Arts & Show, a drama school in Milan, Italy in 2009. She attended M.A.S. from 2009 to 2011. In 2009, she was cast as a performer for the "Il Mondo di Patty" tour, the Italian version of the widely successful Argentine children's program, Patito Feo. The tour held concerts in Italy and Spain. She also appeared as a backup vocalist for Brenda Asnicar's special section of the same tour in Italy.

== Acting career ==
While living in Milan and attending M.A.S., she learned of a Disney Channel Latin America casting search for Italian actors, who also spoke Spanish. Although she spoke little Spanish, Comello memorized and performed a short monologue in Spanish for her audition. One week after auditioning, she successfully obtained a role on Violetta, the network's latest tween musical television series. In 2011, Lodovica was announced as "Francesca", the best friend and classmate of the title character in the show. Filming for the program required Comello to move to Buenos Aires in mid-2011. Once cast in the series, Comello learned Spanish.

In November 2012, she filmed the second season of Violetta in Buenos Aires and Barcelona, Spain. It premiered on 29 April 2013. That same year, she provided the Italian voiceover for "Britney" in Monster's University. Comello returned to film the third and final season of "Violetta" which began production in Buenos Aires in March 2014 and ended in late November of that same year. The third season began airing in Argentina on 28 July 2014. The series finale aired in Latin America on 6 February 2015.

In late August 2016, Comello was revealed as a cast member in the Italian comedy film Poveri ma ricchi ("Poor but rich" in English). The movie filmed in Rome and Milan and was released in Italian cinemas on 15 December 2016. The role is Comello's cinema debut and first live action acting role since the completion of Violetta.

== Music career ==
=== 2013–2015: Universo and Mariposa ===
On 1 November 2013, Comello released "Universo" ("Universe" in English), the lead single from her debut album of the same name; the album was later released on 19 November 2013 in Italy, Spain and Argentina. The album features nine tracks co-written by Comello and one English-language cover of I Only Want to Be with You. Comello recorded acoustic versions of the title track, "Universo" in Spanish and Italian. The album's second single was "Otro día más". The music video was filmed in Barcelona, Spain and premiered on her official YouTube channel in March 2014.

In May 2014, Comello announced plans to embark on a world tour in 2015. A special website was created to allow fans to vote on various international cities for possible concert locations in Latin America, Europe, Israel, and the United States. The music video for her third single, "I Only Want To Be With You" premiered on her official VEVO channel on 5 September 2014.

In 2014, Comello began writing songs for her second album during breaks on the set while filming of the final season of Violetta in Buenos Aires. She recorded material in Buenos Aires on the weekends when the show was not filming. On 24 January 2015, Comello announced to fans via her official Twitter account that her second album, Mariposa ("Butterfly"), would be released on 3 February 2015 in Italy. The album was subsequently released on iTunes for Europe and Latin America a few weeks later. The album contains 12 songs in Spanish, Italian and English. She co-wrote most of the album's songs with the exception of "Un posto libero", "We Are Family" and "Crazy Love". The album's deluxe edition contains five Italian-language translations of some of the album's original Spanish songs. Comello skipped the 2015 world tour with the cast of Violetta to focus on promoting her material as a solo artist. Her world tour began in Rome with two sold-out shows on 1 February 2015. She toured throughout Italy from February until mid-March, and then in June, July and October. The tour included shows in Spain, Belgium, Poland, Portugal, and France.

The album's lead single, "Todo El Resto No Cuenta", was released on iTunes on 30 January 2015. The single's music video premiered one day later. The album debuted at No. 13 on the Italian Album charts. Mariposa's second single,"Sin usar palabras", features Spanish singer Abraham Mateo. Comello also released a Polish version of "Sin usar palabras" featuring Szymon Chodyniecki. Her world tour to support the release of Mariposa ended on 25 October 2015 in Naples, Italy.

=== 2016–present: New music ===
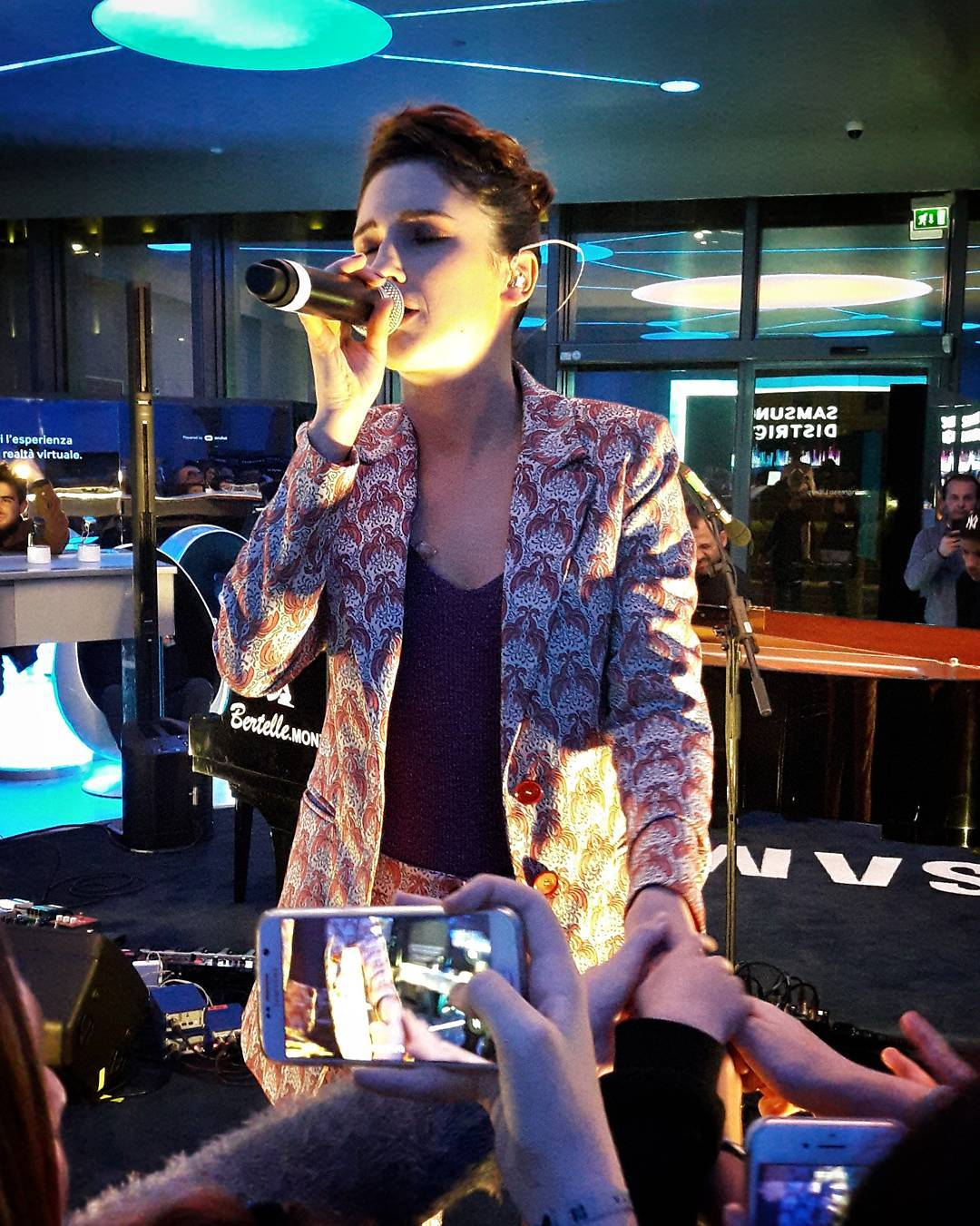
Comello performing in 2017

On 13 May 2016, Comello released the Italian-language song "Non cadiamo mai" ("Never Fall" in English) as the lead single from her upcoming untitled third studio album. The release of the single conceded with the season 4 finale of "Italia's Got Talent", which aired that same night in Italy. Comello co-wrote the song, and a Spanish-language version is expected to be released. The music video for the single premiered one day prior on her official VEVO channel.

On 12 December 2016, it was confirmed by festival organizers that Comello would be taking part in the 2017 edition of the Sanremo Music Festival, considered the greatest music festival in Italy. The winner of the festival is offered a chance to represent Italy in Eurovision. She participated with the song, Il cielo non-mi basta. The Sanremo Music Festival was held from 7 to 11 February 2017. Comello finished in 12th place out of 16 finalists. Directed by her husband, the official music video for Il cielo non-mi basta, was released on her official VEVO account in Italy on 8 February 2017. The song peaked at 37 on the Italian FIMI Singles Chart, becoming the first single of her music career to enter on the chart. On 5 May 2017, she released her second single, "50 Shades of Colours", from her upcoming third studio album. The music video, filmed in Rome, was premiered as an exclusive for Corriere della Sera, the Milan-based newspaper. Comello performed three concerts in Rome on 19 May, in Milan on 26 May, and in Udine on 21 July to promote her new music.

== Other ventures ==
On 2 April 2015, Comello released her autobiography, Tutto il resto non-conta: la musica, Buenos Aires, e un pollo al curry con chi dico io, in Italy; she wrote the book while living in Buenos Aires during the filming of Violetta's final season: to promote the book, Comello embarked on several book signings throughout Italy in April 2015; the book was later translated into Polish, and she held a signing in Warsaw on 9 May 2015.

In September 2015, Comello was announced as the new host for the 7th season of Italia's Got Talent. Auditions began in Milan in late 2015; the 7th season of Italia's Got Talent premiered on 16 March 2016 on Sky Uno, where it aired weeknights. The finale was held in Rome and aired live on 13 May 2016 for the Italian network, TV8. Comello is the host of the new music themed game show, "Singing in the Car", which premiered on 5 September 2016 in Italy on the network, TV8.

Comello is the host of the children's talent show, "Kid's Got Talent", the spin-off of "Italia's Got Talent". The show premiered on 18 December 2016 on TV8 in Italy.

== Personal life ==
Comello has one older sister named Ilaria. She speaks fluent Italian, Spanish, and English. She lived in Buenos Aires, settling in the Palermo neighborhood, for three years while working on Violetta. She moved back to Milan, Italy once production on the series ended in late November 2014. In 2012, Comello met Argentine television producer, Tomas Goldschmidt, on the set of Violetta. The couple dated for four years and later married in a small civil ceremony at the city hall in San Daniele del Friuli, Italy on 1 April 2015.

In November 2019, Comello announced to fans via Instagram that she and her husband were expecting their first child, a boy, in early spring. On 16 March 2020, her son, Teo Goldschmidt, was born in Milan.

== Filmography ==
Films
Year	Title	Role	Notes
2013	Monsters University	Britney Davis	Italian dub; voice role
2016	The Eagle Huntress	Narrator	
2016	Poveri ma ricchi	Valentina	Feature film debut
2017	Poveri ma ricchissimi	Valentina	
2018	Smallfoot	Meechee	Italian dub; voice role
2023	Trolls Band Together	Poppy	Italian dub; voice role

Television
Year	Title	Role	Notes
2012	Francesca's Videoblog	Francesca Cauviglia	Webseries
2012–15	Violetta	Francesca Cauviglia	Main role; 240 episodes
2016	Un posto al sole	Herself	Episode: "Season 21 Episode 45"
2016–17	Singing in the Car	Herself	Host
2016–17	Kid's Got Talent	Herself	Host
2016–22	Italia's Got Talent	Herself	Host
2017	Sanremo Music Festival 2017	Herself	Contestant
2017	Zecchino d'Oro	Herself	Judge
2018–19	Mix and Match	Herself	Host
2019	ExtraVergine	Dafne Amoroso	Main role; 10 episodes
2021–present	Casa Comello	Herself	Host

== Discography ==
=== Studio albums ===
List of studio albums, with selected details, chart positions, sales, and certifications
Title	Album details	Peak chart positions			
Title	Album details	ITA	POL	SPA	POR
Universo	Released: 19 November 2013; Label: Sony Italy; Formats: CD, digital download	22	12	56	—
Mariposa	Released: 3 February 2015; Label: Sony Italy; Formats: CD, digital download	13	12	81	10

=== Soundtrack albums ===
Title	Album details	Peak positions									Certifications
Title	Album details	ARG	BEL (Vl)	BEL (Wa)	BRA	FRA	ITA	ESP	POL	POR	Certifications
Violetta	Released: 5 June 2012; Label: Walt Disney; Formats: CD, digital download, streaming	—	41	22	28	15	1	2	3	1	ARG: 4× Platinum; COL: Gold; ESP: Platinum; ITA: Platinum; POL: 2× Platinum; BRA: Gold; URU: Platinum; VEN: Platinum
Cantar es lo que soy	Released: 23 November 2012; Label: Walt Disney; Formats: CD, DVD, digital download, streaming	3	—	—	—	—	1	—	5	—	ARG: 3× Platinum; COL: Gold; POL: Gold; URU: Platinum; VEN: Gold
Hoy somos más	Released: 11 June 2013; Label: Walt Disney; Formats: CD, digital download, streaming	1	42	12	—	14	—	1	1	1	ARG: 2× Platinum; ITA: Platinum; POL: 2× Platinum
Violetta en Vivo	Released: 25 November 2013; Label: Walt Disney; Formats: CD, DVD, digital download, streaming	1	60	13	—	4	—	—	1	—	POL: Gold
Gira mi canción	Released: 18 July 2014; Label: Walt Disney; Formats: CD, digital download, streaming	1	14	5	—	2	—	4	11	1	POL: Gold
Crecimos juntos	Released: 20 April 2015; Label: Walt Disney; Formats: CD, digital download, streaming	—	14	7	—	6	—	4	—	20	POL: Gold
"—" denotes releases that did not chart or were not released in that region.

=== Singles ===
As main artist

Title	Year	Album
"Universo"	2013	Universo
"Otro Día Más"	2014	Universo
"I Only Want to Be with You"	2014	Universo
"Todo el resto no cuenta"	2015	Mariposa
"Sin usar palabras" / "Bez słów" (featuring Abraham Mateo or Szymon Chodyniecki)	2015	Mariposa
"Non cadiamo mai"	2016	Non-album singles
"Il cielo non mi basta"	2017	Non-album singles
"Le mille bolle blu"	2017	Non-album singles
"50 Shades of Colours"	2017	Non-album singles
"Run"	2018	Non-album singles

=== Promotional singles ===
List of promotional singles, showing year released and album name
Title	Year	Album
"Juntos somos más" (with Mechi Lambre, Cande Molfese, Facundo Gambandé, Jorge Blanco, Nick Garnier and Rodrigo Velilla)	2012	Violetta
"Ti Credo"	2012	Violetta
"En Gira" (with Violetta cast)	2014	Gira mi canción

=== Music videos ===
Title	Year
"Universo"	2013
"Otro Día Más"	2014
"I Only Want to Be With You"	2014
"Todo el resto no cuenta"	2015
"Sin usar palabras" (featuring Abraham Mateo)	2015
"Bez słów" ("Sin usar palabras" Polish Version) (featuring Szymon Chodyniecki)	2015
"Non cadiamo mai"	2016
"Il cielo non mi basta"	2017
"50 Shades of Colours"	2017
"Run"	2018

== Tours ==
=== Headlining ===
- Lodovica World Tour (2015)
- #Noi2 Tour (2017)

=== Co-headlining ===
- Violetta en Vivo (2013–2014)

=== Supporting ===
- Il Mondo di Patty (As backup singer and dancer) (2009–2010)
- Antonella in Concerto (As backup singer and dancer) (2010)

== Awards and nominations ==
Year	Award	Category	Result
2013	Nickelodeon Kids' Choice Awards	Favorite TV Actress	Nominated
2014	FWEnVivoAwards	Golden voice	Won
2017	Diversity Media Awards	Influencer of The Year	Won
2017	Macchianera Awards	Character of The Year	Nominated
2017	Macchianera Awards	Best Instagrammer	Nominated
2017	Macchianera Awards	Best Tweeter	Nominated
2017	CocaColaFMAwards	Best International Artist	Won
2018	Complejo Sur Kids' Choice Awards	Best Artist in Latin America	Won
