= Lodovica World Tour =

2015 concert tour by Lodovica Comello

- Tour by Lodovica Comello
- Associated album: Universo; Mariposa
- Start date: February 1, 2015
- End date: October 25, 2015
- Legs: 1
- No. of shows: 21 in Italy; 3 in Spain; 2 in Portugal; 1 in France; 1 in Belgium; 1 in Poland; 29 in total

Lodovica Comello concert chronology
- Lodovica World Tour (2015); #Noi2 Tour (2017)

The Lodovica World Tour (also known as LodoLive2015) was the first solo concert tour by Italian singer, actress and host Lodovica Comello, in support of her first two solo studio albums, Universo (2013) and Mariposa (2015). Officially announced in May 2014, it traveled across Italy, Spain, Portugal, France, Belgium and Poland. It began on February 1, 2015 in Rome, Italy, with two sold-out shows and concluded on October 25, 2015 in Naples, Italy.

== Background ==
The tour was announced by the singer on May 13, 2014, when the first two Italian dates were confirmed: Turin and Naples. The next month was announced the Rome concert scheduled for February 1, 2015, which opens the tour. In addition, a website is launched where fans can vote on the locations where they want to see the concert between European cities, Latin America and North America as well as some Western Asian countries and cities of Russia. Votes, which were opened in May, ended in June 2014. In June Milan, Palermo and Catania were added to concerts already confirmed, while in July was announced Bari. The following months were announced concerts in Padua, Rende, Pescara, Lecce and Florence.

To prepare for the performances, Lodovica frequented singing lessons with Alessandro Formenti from December 2014 until the following February. During the shows were presented songs from both the albums, the first, Universo, and the second, Mariposa; In addition to a medley taken from the series in which Comello recited, the soap opera Violetta. The concerts of February 2015 in Rome and Milan reached a double sold-out. In the same month new dates were announced in Pordenone, Udine and Bologna and all Portuguese, Spanish and French dates. The dates of Udine, Catanzaro, Rende and Naples made sold-out.

In April, the Lodovica World Tour also stopped in Brussels. In addition, it was announced that the tour would also go to Argentina, Chile, Venezuela, Uruguay, Mexico, Russia, Hungary, Romania and Poland. For unknown reasons, no concerts were made in all the countries mentioned, except for Poland. Spanish dates scheduled for April in Bilbao, Zaragoza and Valencia were canceled for unknown reasons. After the concert of May 5 in Madrid, the tour stopped for more than a month. On June 26, the tour resumed in the birthplace of the singer, San Daniele del Friuli, and two days later it was in Warsaw for a new and unique date in Poland. During the summer, new dates were confirmed in Mondragone, Rome, Milan, Roccella Jonica, Diamante and Naples. However, the concerts scheduled for Roccella Jonica, Diamante and Roma respectively on August 7, 8, and October 25 were canceled at the end of July.

== Setlist ==
The setlist is the same for all concerts. The only change can be made for songs in which exists an Italian and a Spanish version.

1. Opening
2. Universo (acoustic)
3. La Cosa Más Linda
4. La Historia
5. Sòlo Música
6. Un posto libero
7. Una Nueva Estrella
8. Otro Día Más
9. No voy a caer
10. Vado (or Vuelvo)
11. Violetta's song medley (Veo Veo, Hoy somos más, Ven y canta or Vieni e canta, Aprendí a Decir Adiós)
12. Ci vediamo quando è buio
13. Sin usar palabras
14. Un viaggio intorno al mondo
15. Crazy Love
16. Para siempre
17. Libro bianco (or Historia blanca)
18. I Only Want to Be with You
19. Il mio amore appeso a un filo (or Mi amor pende de un hilo)
20. Todo el resto no cuenta
21. Universo
22. We are family

== Dates ==
List of concerts, showing date, city, country and venue.
Date	City	Country	Venue
Europe
February 1, 2015	Rome	Italy	Auditorium Conciliazione
February 7, 2015	Milan	Italy	Teatro LinearCiack
February 10, 2015	Turin	Italy	Teatro Colosseo
February 21, 2015	Padua	Italy	Gran Teatro Geox
February 26, 2015	Bari	Italy	Teatro Team
February 28, 2015	Naples	Italy	PalaPartenope
March 1, 2015	Catanzaro	Italy	Politeama
March 3, 2015	Palermo	Italy	Teatro Massimo Vittorio Emanuele
March 4, 2015	Catania	Italy	Teatro Metropolitan
March 6, 2015	Rende	Italy	Teatro Garden
March 8, 2015	Lecce	Italy	Teatro Politeama Greco
March 10, 2015	Pordenone	Italy	Teatro Giuseppe Verdi
March 13, 2015	Udine	Italy	Teatro Nuovo Giovanni da Udine
March 15, 2015	Bologna	Italy	Teatro Europauditorium
March 17, 2015	Pescara	Italy	Teatro Massimo
March 18, 2015	Florence	Italy	Teatro ObiHall
March 21, 2015	Barcelona	Spain	Teatro Barts
April 2, 2015	Porto	Portugal	Coliseu do Porto
April 4, 2015	Lisbon	Portugal	Coliseu dos Recreios
April 24, 2015	Brussels	Belgium	Cirque Royal
April 25, 2015	Paris	France	Casino de Paris
May 3, 2015	Seville	Spain	Auditorio Riberas del Guadaira
May 5, 2015	Madrid	Spain	Teatro Nuevo Apolo
June 26, 2015	San Daniele del Friuli	Italy	Piazza Vittorio Emanuele
June 28, 2015	Warsaw	Poland	Ursynów Arena
July 25, 2015	Mondragone	Italy	Foof
October 10, 2015	Milan	Italy	Teatro Manzoni
October 24, 2015	Rome	Italy	Teatro Brancaccio
October 25, 2015	Naples	Italy	Casa della musica

== Cancelled shows ==
List of cancelled concerts, showing date, city, country, venue and reason for cancellation
Date	City	Country	Venue	Reason/Additional Info
April 28, 2015	Bilbao	Spain	Teatro Campos Eliseos	Unknown reasons
April 29, 2015	Zaragoza	Spain	Auditorio de Zaragoza	Unknown reasons
April 30, 2015	Valencia	Spain	Palacio de Congresos	Unknown reasons
August 7, 2015	Roccella Jonica	Italy	Teatro al Castello	Unknown reasons
August 8, 2015	Diamante	Italy	Teatro dei Ruderi di Cirella	Unknown reasons
October 25, 2015	Rome	Italy	Teatro Brancaccio	Unknown reasons, but the concert was replaced with a concert the same day in Naples
