= Daddies on Request =

Mexican comedy-drama television series

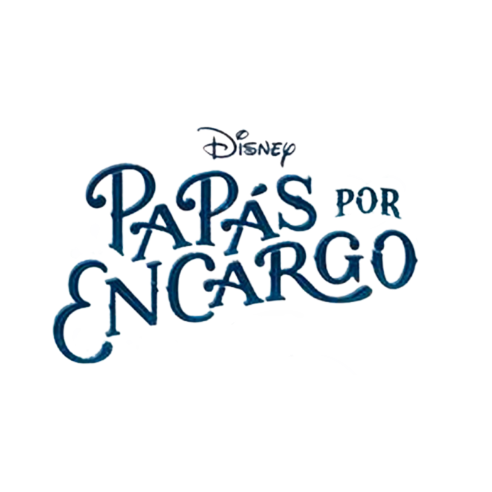
- Spanish: Papás por encargo
- Genre: Comedy drama; Musical
- Written by: Julio César Mármol Olivares/ Ana Sofía Clerici
- Directed by: Pato Safa; Javier Colinas
- Starring: Jorge Blanco; Michael Ronda; Lalo Brito; Farah Justiniani
- Country of origin: Mexico
- Original language: Spanish
- No. of seasons: 2
- No. of episodes: 17

Production
- Producer: Gabriela Valentan
- Production locations: Zacatecas; Mazatlán; Pátzcuaro; La Paz; Durango; Pachuca
- Running time: 30–38 minutes
- Production company: BTF Media

Original release
- Network: Disney+
- Release: 13 July 2022 – 8 November 2023

Daddies on Request (Spanish: Papás por encargo) is a Mexican comedy drama television series for children and adolescents, produced by BTF Media for The Walt Disney Company. The first season premiered in Latin America on 13 July 2022, on Disney+. It was released in the United States on 23 November on Disney+. The second season premiered on 8 November 2023 in Latin America.

== Plot ==
On her thirteenth birthday, California receives an unexpected gift: the key to an ice cream truck from her mother Itzel, who mysteriously disappeared many years ago and now wants to see California again in Zacatecas. California's three adoptive fathers, Miguel, Morgan, and Diego, initially disagree with this plan, but after realizing that it would make California happy they decide to bring the mother and daughter back together.

== Cast ==
- Jorge Blanco as Miguel
- Michael Ronda as Morgan
- Lalo Brito as Diego
- Farah Justiniani as California
- Valérie Camarena Ibarra as young California
- Fátima Molina as Itzel
- Itatí Cantoral as Maricarmen
- Karla Farfán as Paulina
- Mauricio Isaac as Patricio Sandoval
- Alfonso 'Poncho' Borbolla as Riquezes
- Daniel Haddad as Gamboa
- Martín Castro as Emilio
- Giovanna Reynaud as Denisse
- Santiago Torres as Neto
- Hernán Mendoza as Gustavo

== Episodes ==
=== Season 1 ===
No. overall	No. in season	Title	Directed by	Written by	Original release date
1	1	"The Gift" "El regalo"	Pato Safa	Ana Sofía Clerici & Julio César Mármol O	13 July 2022
2	2	"The Rescue" "El rescate"	Javier Colinas	Ana Sofía Clerici & Julio César Mármol O	13 July 2022
3	3	"The Secret" "El secreto"	Pato Safa	Ana Sofía Clerici & Julio César Mármol O	13 July 2022
4	4	"Guilt" "La culpa"	Javier Colinas	Ana Sofía Clerici & Julio César Mármol O	13 July 2022
5	5	"The Return" "El regreso"	Pato Safa	Ana Sofía Clerici & Julio César Mármol O	13 July 2022
6	6	"The Search" "La búsqueda"	Pato Safa	Ana Sofía Clerici & Julio César Mármol O	13 July 2022
7	7	"The Change" "El cambio"	Pato Safa	Ana Sofía Clerici & Julio César Mármol O	13 July 2022
8	8	"The Arrival" "La llegada"	Javier Colinas	Ana Sofía Clerici & Julio César Mármol O	13 July 2022
9	9	"The Enemy" "El enemigo"	Javier Colinas	Ana Sofía Clerici & Julio César Mármol O	13 July 2022
10	10	"The Destination" "El destino"	Javier Colinas	Ana Sofía Clerici & Julio César Mármol O	13 July 2022

=== Season 2 ===
No. overall	No. in season	Title	Directed by	Written by	Original release date
1	1	"The return" "La vuelta"	Pato Safa	Ana Sofía Clerici & Julio César Mármol O	8 November 2023
2	2	"The name" "El nombre"	Javier Colinas	Ana Sofía Clerici & Julio César Mármol O	8 November 2023
3	3	"The lovers" "Los amantes"	Pato Safa	Ana Sofía Clerici & Julio César Mármol O	8 November 2023
4	4	"The discord" "La discordia"	Javier Colinas	Ana Sofía Clerici & Julio César Mármol O	8 November 2023
5	5	"The heart" "El corazón"	Pato Safa	Ana Sofía Clerici & Julio César Mármol O	8 November 2023
6	6	"The truth" "La verdad"	Pato Safa	Ana Sofía Clerici & Julio César Mármol O	8 November 2023
7	7	"The home" "El hogar"	Pato Safa	Ana Sofía Clerici & Julio César Mármol O	8 November 2023
