= Vamos (song) =

Single by Jorge Blanco
- Language: Spanish, English
- English title: "Let's Go"
- Released: May 31, 2019
- Recorded: 2019
- Genre: Latin pop
- Length: 3:11
- Label: Hollywood
- Songwriters: Jorge Blanco; Jakke Erixson; Jimmy Jansson; Leopoldo Méndez; Palle Hammarlund
- Producer: Jakke Erixson

Jorge Blanco singles chronology
"Conmigo" (2019)	"Vamos" (2019)	"Me Voy Contigo" (2019)

Music video
- "Vamos" on YouTube

"Vamos" (transl. "Let's Go") is a song recorded by Mexican singer Jorge Blanco. The song was released by Hollywood Records on May 31, 2019. The accompanying music video was also released on Blanco's YouTube channel on the same day. Blanco announced the song on May 27, 2019, four days prior to its release. The song reached the top 20 in Panama.

== Composition and lyrics ==
The song was written by Blanco, Jakke Erixson, Jimmy Jansson, Leopoldo Méndez and Palle Hammarlund, with production by Erixson. The song's lyrics talks about a love story that exists between a couple and where everything is joy and happiness. It was Blanco's first song featuring both Spanish and English lyrics.

== Music video ==
Blanco first confirmed on April 29, 2019, that he already taped the accompanying music video for the song. It was released a month later, on May 31, 2019 (same day as the single's release).

== Commercial performance ==
"Vamos" became Blanco's first charting single ever in his career. In Panama, the song debuted and peaked at number 17 during the week of August 26, 2019, becoming Blanco's first top 20 single in Panama. Three weeks later, the song re-entered the charts at its peak of number 17 during the week of September 16, 2019, spending two non-consecutive weeks on the chart.

== Charts ==
Chart (2019)	Peak position
Panama (Monitor Latino)	17

== Release history ==
Region	Date	Format	Label	Ref.
Various	May 31, 2019	Digital download; streaming	Hollywood	
