= Poveri ma ricchissimi =

2017 Italian comedy film

- Theatrical release poster
- Directed by: Fausto Brizzi
- Written by: Fausto Brizzi; Marco Martani; Luca Vecchi
- Produced by: Lorenzo Gangarossa; Lorenzo Mieli; Mario Gianani
- Starring: Christian De Sica; Enrico Brignano; Lucia Ocone; Lodovica Comello; Anna Mazzamauro; Paolo Rossi
- Cinematography: Marcello Montarsi
- Edited by: Luciana Pandolfelli
- Music by: Tommaso Paradiso; Matteo Cantaluppi
- Distributed by: Warner Bros. Pictures
- Release date: December 14, 2017 (Italy)
- Running time: 94 minutes
- Country: Italy
- Language: Italian
- Box office: $7,285,527

Poveri ma ricchissimi (lit. 'Poor but very rich') is a 2017 Italian comedy film directed by Fausto Brizzi.

The film is a sequel to 2016 Poveri ma ricchi.

== Cast ==
- Christian De Sica as Danilo Tucci
- Enrico Brignano as Marcello Bertocchi
- Lucia Ocone as Loredana Bertocchi
- Lodovica Comello as Valentina
- Anna Mazzamauro as granma Nicoletta
- Paolo Rossi as Libero
- Giulio Bartolomei as Kevi Tucci
- Federica Lucaferri as Tamara Tucci
- Massimo Ciavarro as Rudy
- Ubaldo Pantani as Gustavo
- Tess Masazza as Cloe
- Giobbe Covatta as Don Genesio
- Dario Cassini as Prime Minister
- Nicolò De Devitiis as himself
