= Poveri ma ricchi =

2016 Italian comedy film

- Theatrical release poster
- Directed by: Fausto Brizzi
- Written by: Fausto Brizzi; Marco Martani
- Produced by: Fausto Brizzi; Lorenzo Mieli; Mario Gianani
- Starring: Christian De Sica; Enrico Brignano; Lucia Ocone; Lodovica Comello; Anna Mazzamauro
- Cinematography: Marcello Montarsi
- Edited by: Luciana Pandolfelli
- Music by: Francesco Gabbani
- Distributed by: Warner Bros. Pictures
- Release date: December 15, 2016 (Italy)
- Running time: 96 minutes
- Country: Italy
- Language: Italian
- Box office: $7,272,904

Poveri ma ricchi (lit. 'Poor but rich') is a 2016 Italian comedy film directed by Fausto Brizzi.

The film is a loose remake of the 2011 French film Les Tuche. A sequel entitled Poveri ma ricchissimi was released in December 2017.

== Cast ==
- Christian De Sica as Danilo Tucci
- Enrico Brignano as Marcello Bertocchi
- Lucia Ocone as Loredana Bertocchi
- Lodovica Comello as Valentina
- Anna Mazzamauro as granma Nicoletta
- Giulio Bartolomei as Kevi Tucci
- Federica Lucaferri as Tamara Tucci
- Ubaldo Pantani as Gustavo
- Gianmarco Tognazzi as Lallo De Bernardi
- Paolo Casiraghi as Luigi Sleiter
- Camila Raznovich as Danila Sleiter
- Giobbe Covatta as Don Genesio
- Stefano Ambrogi as Danilo's boss
- Massimo Ferrero as fellow citizen of Torresecca
- Luca Sandri as Grand Hotel's concierge
- Bebo Storti as the cook
- Miloud Mourad Benamara as Farouk
- Al Bano as himself
- Gabriel Garko as himself
