= Violetta (soundtrack) =

Soundtrack album by Cast of Violetta
- Released: 5 June 2012
- Recorded: 2011
- Genre: Pop
- Length: 42:17
- Label: Walt Disney

Cast of Violetta chronology
Violetta (2012)	Cantar es lo que soy (2012)

Singles from Violetta
- 1. "En mi mundo" Released: 5 April 2012; 2. "Juntos somos más" Released: 1 May 2012; 3. "Entre tú y yo" Released: 26 May 2012; 4. "Voy por ti" Released: 6 June 2012; 5. "Tienes todo" Released: 12 June 2012; 6. "Te creo" Released: 13 July 2012

Violetta is the soundtrack album to the eponymous series.

== Background ==
=== Production ===
The album was recorded during the filming of the first season of the television series. The lead single "En mi mundo" was released on 5 April 2012 with their official video, and subsequently published other singles from the album.

=== Released ===
Released in Latin America on 5 June 2012, in Italy on 12 October 2012 with 16 tracks, two more than the original with the re-release of the songs "En mi mundo" and "Te creo" in Italian, the second sung by actress Lodovica Comello. In Spain, was released on November 20, 2012.

To promote the album in Italy the actor Ruggero Pasquarelli met with fans at Mondadori in Milan on 27 October 2012.

=== Certifications ===
The album received quadruple platinum in Argentina for selling more than 180,000 copies and platinum in Spain. It's also become certified gold in Colombia and Chile, and platinum in Uruguay and Venezuela. Junto a ti is featured in the rhythm video game Just Dance 2016. In Mexico and Brazil, the album has sold more than 20,000 copies.

== Track listing ==
=== Latin American edition ===
The Latin American edition contains 14 songs.
No.	Title	Writer(s)	Length
1.	"En Mi Mundo (In My Own World)" (Martina Stoessel)	Sebastian Mellino, Pablo Correa, Ezequiel Bauza	3:32
2.	"Algo Suena en Mi (What Burns In Me)" (Facundo Gambandé, Lodovica Comello & Candelaria Molfese)	Eduardo Frigerio, Claudio Yuste	2:14
3.	"Destinada a Brillar (Destined to Shine)" (Alba Rico, Jorge Blanco, Nicolás Garnier, Mercedes Lambre)	Eduardo Frigerio, Claudio Yuste	1:44
4.	"Te Creo (I Love You)" (Martina Stoessel)	Eduardo Frigerio, Claudio Yuste	3:59
5.	"Voy por Ti (More Tears)" (Jorge Blanco)	Sebastian Mellino, Pablo Correa, Ezequiel Bauza	2:26
6.	"Juntos Somos Más (Always Dancing)" (Mercedes Lambre, Facundo Gambandé, Lodovica Comello & Candelaria Molfese)	Eduardo Frigerio, Claudio Yuste	2:57
7.	"Entre Tu y Yo (The Only One I See)" (Pablo Espinosa)	Eduardo Frigerio, Claudio Yuste	3:24
8.	"Are You Ready For the Ride?" (Facundo Gambandé, Jorge Blanco, Nicolás Garnier, Rodrigo Velilla, Alex Heartman, Hector David Jr., Najee de-Tiege, Samuel Nascimento)	Sebastian Mellino, Pablo Correa, Ezequiel Bauza	2:53
9.	"Dile Que Si (Tell Him That's He)" (Jorge Blanco, Nicolás Garnier, Rodrigo Velilla, Steven Skyler)	Sebastian Mellino, Pablo Correa, Ezequiel Bauza	3:01
10.	"Junto a Ti (Best Friend)" (Lodovica Comello & Martina Stoessel)	Sebastian Mellino, Pablo Correa, Ezequiel Bauza	2:42
11.	"Tienes Todo (Give It All)" (Martina Stoessel & Pablo Espinosa)	Sebastian Mellino, Pablo Correa, Ezequiel Bauza	3:49
12.	"Veo Veo (Once Again)" (Candelaria Molfese, Lodovica Comello, Martina Stoessel, Erika Fong, Brittany Anne Pirtle)	Sebastian Mellino, Pablo Correa, Ezequiel Bauza	2:32
13.	"Habla Si Puedes (Talk If You Can)" (Martina Stoessel)	Sebastian Mellino, Pablo Correa, Ezequiel Bauza	3:33
14.	"Ven y Canta (Feel Your Heart)" (Cast of Violetta)	Sebastian Mellino, Pablo Correa, Ezequiel Bauza	2:49

=== Italy edition ===
The edition published in Italy contains, in addition to the Spanish version, two tracks:
No.	Title	Writer(s)	Length
15.	"Nel Mio Mondo (In My World)" (Martina Stoessel)	Lorena Brancucci, Sebastian Mellino, Pablo Correa, Ezequiel Bauza	3:32
16.	"Ti Credo (I Believe You)" (Lodovica Comello)	Eduardo Frigerio, Claudio Yuste, Matteo Grenci	3:59

=== Brazil edition ===
The edition published in Brazil contains, in addition to the Spanish version, an extra track:
No.	Title	Length
15.	"Pelo Mundo (Over the World)" (Mayra Arduini)	1:05

== Charts ==
=== Weekly charts ===
Weekly chart performance for Violetta
Chart (2012–2013)	Peak position
Austrian Albums (Ö3 Austria)	20
Belgian Albums (Ultratop Flanders)	41
Belgian Albums (Ultratop Wallonia)	22
Dutch Albums (Album Top 100)	80
French Albums (SNEP)	15
German Albums (Offizielle Top 100)	38
Hungarian Albums (MAHASZ)	6
Polish Albums (ZPAV)	3
Portuguese Albums (AFP)	1
Spanish Albums (PROMUSICAE)	2

=== Year-end charts ===
Year-end chart performance for Violetta
Chart (2012)	Position
Spanish Albums (PROMUSICAE)	9
Chart (2013)	Position
Spanish Albums (PROMUSICAE)	7

== Certifications ==
Region	Certification	Certified units/sales
Chile (CHI)	Gold	5,000^{^}
Poland (ZPAV)	2× Platinum	40,000^{*}
Spain (PROMUSICAE)	3× Platinum	120,000^{^}
^{*} Sales figures based on certification alone.^{^} Shipments figures based on certification alone.

== Awards and nominations ==
Year	Award	Category	Result
2013	Premios Gardel	Best Soundtrack Album of Film / Television	Won
