= Cantar es lo que soy =

Soundtrack album by Cast of Violetta
- Released: 29 November 2012
- Recorded: 2012
- Genre: Pop
- Label: Walt Disney

Cast of Violetta chronology
Violetta (2012)	Cantar es lo que soy (2012)	Hoy somos más (2013)

Cantar es lo que soy (English: Singing is who I am) is the second soundtrack album of the TV series Violetta.

== Background ==
The album was recorded during the filming of the first season of the television series. It was released in Latin America on 29 November 2012. The album contains one CD with 10 tracks and one DVD with 9 music videos of their most popular songs.

In Italy the album was released on 18 March 2013 and was renamed Violetta: La musica è il mio mondo with 11 tracks, one more than the original with the re-release of the song "En mi mundo" in Italian. The album reached number one on the first week.

The album has been certified Triple Platinum in Argentina, Platinum in Uruguay, Gold in Venezuela, Colombia and Chile.

The album was released in Spain under the name ''Violetta: La Música es mi Mundo.

== Track listing ==
=== Latin American edition ===
CD
No.	Title	Length
1.	"Ser mejor" (Cast of Violetta)	3:25
2.	"En mi mundo" (Martina Stoessel & College 11)	3:35
3.	"Tu foto de verano" (Jorge Blanco, Nicolás Garnier, Samuel Nascimento, Alex Heartman, Hector David Jr., Najee de-Tiege, Rodrigo Velilla & Facundo Gambandé)	2:49
4.	"Mi perdición" (Rock Bones & Martina Stoessel)	3:21
5.	"Te esperaré" (Jorge Blanco)	3:02
6.	"Verte de lejos" (Pablo Espinosa)	2:44
7.	"Cuando me voy" (Jorge Blanco, Nicolás Garnier, Samuel Nascimento, Rodrigo Velilla & Facundo Gambandé)	2:55
8.	"Ahí estaré" (Mercedes Lambre & Facundo Gambandé)	3:13
9.	"Podemos" (Jorge Blanco & Martina Stoessel)	3:21
10.	"Tienes el talento" (Cast of Violetta)	2:06

DVD
No.	Title	Length
1.	"En mi Mundo" (Martina Stoessel)	3:31
2.	"Juntos somos más" (Mercedes Lambre, Facundo Gambandé, Lodovica Comello & Candelaria Molfese)	2:57
3.	"Te creo" (Martina Stoessel)	3:58
4.	"Entre tú y yo" (Pablo Espinosa)	3:24
5.	"Voy por ti" (Jorge Blanco)	2:28
6.	"Habla si puedes" (Martina Stoessel)	3:24
7.	"Tienes todo" (Pablo Espinosa & Martina Stoessel)	3:44
8.	"Are you ready for the ride?" (Jorge Blanco, Nicolás Garnier, Rodrigo Velilla, Samuel Nascimento & Facundo Gambandé)	2:53
9.	"Junto a ti" (Lodovica Comello & Martina Stoessel)	2:42

=== Italy edition ===
CD
No.	Title	Length
11.	"Nel mio mondo" (Martina Stoessel)	3:35

DVD
No.	Title	Length
10.	"Nel mio mondo" (Martina Stoessel)	3:35

=== France edition ===
CD
No.	Title	Length
11.	"Dans mon monde" (Cynthia Tolleron)	3:35

DVD
No.	Title	Length
10.	"Dans mon monde" (Cynthia Tolleron)	3:35

== Charts and certifications ==
=== Charts ===
Chart (2012–13)	Peak position
Argentine Albums (CAPIF)	3
Italian Albums (FIMI)	1
Polish Albums (ZPAV)	5

=== Certifications ===
Region	Certification	Certified units/sales
Poland (ZPAV)	Gold	10,000^{*}
^{*} Sales figures based on certification alone.
