= Mariposa (album) =

Studio album by Lodovica Comello
- Released: February 3, 2015
- Genre: Pop; rock
- Length: 62:51
- Language: Spanish, Italian, English
- Label: Sony Italy

Lodovica Comello chronology
Universo (2013)	Mariposa (2015)

Singles from Mariposa
- 1. "Todo el resto no cuenta" Released: January 30, 2015; 2. "Sin usar palabras" Released: April 24, 2015

Mariposa (English: "Butterfly") is the second album by Italian singer Lodovica Comello. It was released in Italy on February 3, 2015. The first single, "Todo el resto no cuenta", was released ahead of the album's release on January 30, 2015. The second single, "Sin usar palabras", was released on April 24, 2015.

== Track listing ==
Standard edition
No.	Title	Writer(s)	Length
1.	"Mi amor pende de un hilo"	Fabio Serri; Fabio Zacco; Daniele Luppino; Lodovica Comello	3:50
2.	"Un viaggio intorno al mondo"	Serri; Luppino; Comello	4:05
3.	"Todo el resto no cuenta"	Serri; Luppino; Comello	3:29
4.	"Un posto libero"	Massimiliano Elli	4:04
5.	"Vuelvo"	Serri; Luppino; Comello	3:46
6.	"Sin usar palabras" (featuring Abraham Mateo)	Serri; Luppino; Comello	3:06
7.	"We Are Family"	Nile Rodgers	3:37
8.	"No voy a caer"	Serri; Luppino; Comello	3:40
9.	"La historia"	Serri; Luppino; Comello	3:51
10.	"Crazy Love"	Mattia Bindi; Serri	3:32
11.	"Historia blanca"	Serri; Luppino; Comello	3:39
12.	"Ci vediamo quando è buio"	Serri; Luppino; Comello	3:47
Total length:			44:26

Deluxe edition
No.	Title	Writer(s)	Length
13.	"Il mio amore appeso a un filo" (Italian version of "Mi amor pende de un hilo")	Serri; Zacco; Luppino; Comello	3:51
14.	"Tutto il resto non conta" (Italian version of "Todo el resto no cuenta")	Serri; Luppino; Comello	3:29
15.	"Vado" (Italian version of "Vuelvo")	Serri; Luppino; Comello	3:46
16.	"Io non cado più" (Italian version of "No voy a caer")	Serri; Luppino; Comello	3:40
17.	"Libro bianco" (Italian version of "Historia blanca")	Serri; Luppino; Comello	3:39

Polish edition
No.	Title	Writer(s)	Length
13.	"Bez słów" (featuring Szymon Chodyniecki - Polish version of "Sin usar palabras")	Serri; Zacco; Luppino; Comello	3:06

== Charts ==
Chart (2015)	Peak position
Italian Albums (FIMI)	13
Polish Albums (ZPAV)	12
Portuguese Albums (AFP)	10
Spanish Albums (PROMUSICAE)	81
