= Jorge Blanco (musician) =

Mexican musician, singer, dancer, and actor (born 1991)

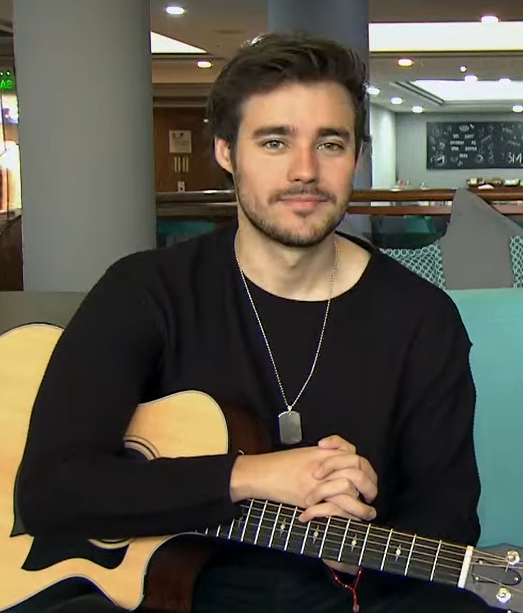
- Jorge Blanco in an interview (2019)
- Born: Jorge Blanco Güereña; December 19, 1991 (age 34); Guadalajara, Mexico
- Occupations: Musician; singer; dancer; actor
- Years active: 2007–present
- Television: Cuando toca la campana; Violetta
- Musical career
- Genre: Pop
- Instruments: Vocals; guitar; piano; drums
- Labels: Walt Disney; Hollywood; Universal Latin
- Website: jorgeblancomusic.com

Jorge Blanco Güereña (born December 19, 1991) is a Mexican musician, singer, dancer and actor, best known for portraying Leon Vargas on the Disney Channel television series Violetta.

== Early life ==
Blanco was born on December 19, 1991, in Guadalajara, Mexico.

== Career ==
=== 2007–2008: Beginnings with High School Musical ===
Blanco began his television career in 2007 when he participated in the reality show High School Musical: La Selección which allowed him to participate in a spin-off movie of the successful U.S. High School Musical. Despite not winning the program, Blanco gave his voice to the album of the program, took part in the movie High School Musical: El Desafío Mexico playing the character of Jorge and participated in the tour promoting the movie and the program between 2007 and 2008. In the film, Blanco played the best friend of the protagonist Cristóbal Rodríguez (Cristobal Orellana), which was published in 2008 in Mexico and the following year in Italy.

=== 2011–2015: Cuando toca la campana and success with Violetta ===
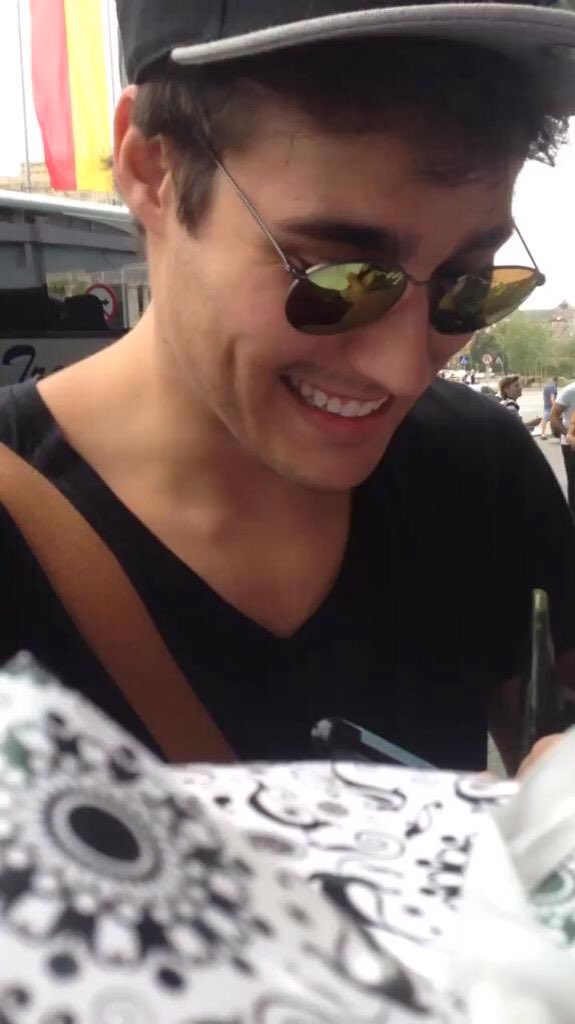
Blanco in 2016

In 2011, Blanco appeared in the tenth episode of the miniseries Highway: Rodando la Aventura and he was also one of the protagonists of the first season of the television series Cuando toca la campana in which he shot several music videos as "Es el momento" or "A Celebrar". In May of that same year, Blanco traveled to the U.S. to participate in the Disney's Friends for Change Games in the yellow team to help the agency UNICEF, he represents, hereinafter to Mexico in the music video by Bridgit Mendler "We Can Change the World" of the project Disney's Friends for Change.

In 2012, Blanco was cast in the Argentine Disney Channel telenovela Violetta as León, the love interest of Violetta. Due to the filming of Violetta, Blanco participated in only four episodes of the second season of Cuando toca la campana. From 2012 to 2015, Blanco gave his voice to the show's soundtracks and also participated in the concert tours promoting the show.

=== 2016–2020: Musical solo debut and Conmigo ===
In February 2016, Blanco announced on his YouTube channel that he signed a recording deal with the Hollywood Records to release his own solo material. On April 22, 2016, Blanco released the music video for his solo song, "Light Your Heart", that is featured on the debut album of Argentine singer and Violetta co-star, Tini, Tini (Martina Stoessel), which is also the soundtrack for the movie Tini: The Movie, which Blanco starred alongside Tini.

On October 12, 2016, Blanco performed the song "Beautiful Mistake" on One Nación. The song was planned to be released as Blanco's debut single in December that year, but these plans never materialized. Blanco's debut single "Risky Business" was released on March 17, 2017. The music video for the song premiered on April 14, 2017. The song "Summer Soul" was released on May 19, 2017, as the follow-up second single. The music video for the song premiered on May 25, 2017. The collaboration between Blanco and fellow artist Saak titled "Una Noche" was released on August 18, 2017. The music video for "Una Noche" premiered on August 31, 2017. From September till October 2017, Blanco opened the European concerts of R5's New Addictions Tour. Blanco was featured on "Gone Is the Night" by Kris Kross Amsterdam, released on November 24, 2017. Blanco's debut extended play titled Conmigo was released on February 14, 2019. On July 20, 2018, Blanco released the original Spanish-language song titled "Si Te Tuviera" as the lead single from the album. On August 17, 2018, Blanco released "Escondida" as the second single from the album. On September 7, 2018, Blanco released "Opciones" as the third single from the album. In September 2018, Blanco opened Sebastián Yatra's concerts in several cities of Mexico. On October 26, 2018, Blanco released "Te La Dedico" as the fourth single from the album. On January 18, 2019, Blanco released the title track "Conmigo" as the fifth single from the album. Blanco performed the songs from the album at an acoustic showcase on the day of the album's release. On May 9, 2019, Blanco began his first solo concert tour, Conmigo Tour.

On May 31, 2019, Blanco released a song titled "Vamos" as a single. On August 23, 2019, Blanco released a song titled "Me Voy Contigo" as the follow-up single. The collaboration between Blanco and Drake Bell titled "No Perdamos Más Tiempo" was released on September 6, 2019. During the fall of 2019, Blanco opened Tini's Quiero Volver Tour concerts in Montevideo, Uruguay, and Buenos Aires, Argentina.

=== 2021–present: Papás por Encargo and new music ===
On March 12, 2021, Blanco was featured on "Say O" from Brazilian DJ and producer Bruno Martini's debut album Original. On March 19, 2021, Blanco released "Polvo De Estrellas", a collaboration with DJ duo AtellaGalli, as a single. On March 26, 2021, the collaboration between Blanco and singer Anna Chase titled "Antídoto" was released as a single. On September 24, 2021, Blanco released a song titled "Hot Damn" as a single. On October 29, 2021, Blanco released a song titled "Bad Karma" as the follow-up single. Blanco voiced Noah in the Latin American version of the animated film Ron's Gone Wrong, released in October 2021. On November 5, 2021, Blanco appeared on the remix of Lalo Brito's song "La Culpa". On March 11, 2022, the collaboration between Blanco and musical group Grupo Cañaveral De Humberto Pabón titled "Dime Que Regresarás" was released as a single.

Blanco was cast in a Disney+ original series Papás por Encargo (Daddies on Request in English) as Miguel, one of the female lead character's three adoptive fathers. The first season of the series was released on July 13, 2022. Blanco sang alongside his co-stars Michael Ronda, Lalo Brito and Farah Justiniani the series' theme song, "Vivo", which was released on June 24, 2022, to promote the show. Blanco appeared alongside some of the cast members of Violetta in a Disney+ special celebrating the show's 10th anniversary, Solo Amor y Mil Canciones, released on December 8, 2022. Blanco sang alongside his Papás por Encargo co-stars Michael Ronda and Lalo Brito the song "Ven", which was released on October 27, 2023, to promote the series' second season, released on November 8. The collaboration between Blanco and duo Hermanas JM titled "24/7" was released on September 6, 2024. In July 2026, Blanco appeared on a remix of Ruggero's song "Polanco".

== Personal life ==
Blanco lived in Buenos Aires, Argentina for three years while working on Violetta. Following the end of the Violetta Live musical tour and the production of Tini: The Movie, Blanco relocated to Los Angeles, United States where he resided for few years before moving back to his home country Mexico. Blanco is fluent in Spanish, English, Italian, Portuguese and French. Since 2007, Blanco has been in a relationship with actress and singer Stephie Caire, whom he had met the same year on High School Musical: La Selección. In August 2016, Blanco and Caire became engaged. In January 2021, Blanco revealed through his social media that he married Caire a few years ago. In an Instagram post on June 13, 2026, Blanco revealed that his wife suffered a miscarriage of their first child after announcing the pregnancy in April.

== Filmography ==
Film roles
Year	Title	Role	Notes
2008	High School Musical: El Desafio Mexico	Jorge	Main role
2014	Violetta: La emoción del concierto	Himself/León	Concert film
2015	Violetta: The Journey	Himself/León	documentary
2016	Tini: The Movie	León Vargas	Main role
2021	Ron's Gone Wrong	Noah (voice)	Latin American version

Television roles
Year	Title	Role	Notes
2007	High School Musical: La Selección	Himself	Musical reality show
2010	Highway: Rodando la Aventura	Diego	Episode: "El mochilero" (season 1, episode 10)
2011–2012	Cuando toca la campana	Pablo	Main role (season 1); Special guest star (4 episodes, season 2)
2011	Disney's Friends for Change Games	Himself	Yellow team
2012–15	Violetta	León Vargas	Main role
2016	Celebs React	Himself	Special guest star (2 episodes, season 1)
2022–23	Papás por Encargo	Miguel	Main role
2022	Solo Amor y Mil Canciones	Himself	Disney+ special celebrating 10 years of Violetta

== Discography ==
=== Extended plays ===
Title	Extended play details
Conmigo	Released: February 14, 2019; Format: CD, digital download, streaming; Label: Hollywood, Universal Latino

=== Singles ===
==== As lead artist ====
List of singles, showing year released and album name
Title	Year	Peak chart positions	Album
Title	Year	PAN	Album
"Risky Business"	2017	—	Non-album singles
"Summer Soul"	2017	—	Non-album singles
"Una Noche" (with Saak)	2017	—	Karma
"Si Te Tuviera"	2018	—	Conmigo
"Escondida"	2018	—	Conmigo
"Opciones"	2018	—	Conmigo
"Te La Dedico"	2018	—	Conmigo
"Conmigo"	2019	—	Conmigo
"Vamos"	2019	17	Non-album singles
"Me Voy Contigo"	2019	—	Non-album singles
"No Perdamos Más Tiempo" (with Drake Bell)	2019	—	Non-album singles
"Polvo de Estrellas" (with AtellaGalli)	2021	—	Non-album singles
"Antídoto" (with Anna Chase)	2021	—	Non-album singles
"Hot Damn"	2021	—	Non-album singles
"Bad Karma"	2021	—	Non-album singles
"La Culpa (Remix)" (with Lalo Brito)	2021	—	Non-album singles
"Dime Que Regresarás" (with Grupo Cañaveral de Humberto Pabón)	2022	—	Aquí Estoy
"24/7" (with Hermanas JM)	2024	—	Non-album single
"Polanco (Remix)" (with Ruggero)	2026	—	La Dolce Vita
"—" denotes a recording that did not chart or was not released in that territory.

==== As featured artist ====
List of singles, showing year released and album name
Title	Year	Album
"Gone Is the Night" (Kris Kross Amsterdam featuring Jorge Blanco)	2017	Non-album single

==== Promotional singles ====
Title	Year	Album
"En Gira" (with Violetta cast)	2014	Gira Mi Canción
"Light Your Heart"	2016	Tini (Martina Stoessel)
"Yo Te Amo a Ti" (with Tini)	2016	Tini (Martina Stoessel)
"NonBelievers" (featuring Stephie Caire)	2016	Non-album promotional single
"Bésame Mucho"	2017	Coco (Banda Sonora Original en Español)
"Vivo" (with Michael Ronda, Lalo Brito and Farah Justiniani)	2022	Papás por Encargo
"Ven" (with Michael Ronda and Lalo Brito)	2023	Papás por Encargo 2

=== Guest appearances ===
Title	Year	Other artist(s)	Album
"Drive My Car"	2017	—N/a	Cars 3
"Say O"	2021	Bruno Martini	Original

=== Soundtracks ===
- High School Musical: El Desafío (2008)
- Cuando Toca La Campana (2011)
- Violetta (2012)
- Cantar Es Lo Que Soy (2012)
- Hoy Somos Más (2013)
- Violetta en Vivo (2013)
- Gira Mi Canción (2014)
- Crecimos Juntos (2015)
- Papás por Encargo (2022)
- Papás por Encargo 2 (2023)

=== Music videos ===
List of videos, showing year released and director
Title	Year	Director
"Light Your Heart"	2016	Phil Andelman
"Yo Te Amo a Ti" (with Tini)	2016	Phil Andelman
"Risky Business"	2017	Kyle Cogan
"Summer Soul"	2017	Nicolas Randall
"Summer Soul" (Tom & Collins Remix)	2017	Adam Scoffield
"Una Noche" (with Saak)	2017	Rodrigo Aroca
"Gone Is the Night" (Kris Kross Amsterdam featuring Jorge Blanco)	2017	Lars Brink
"Si Te Tuviera"	2018	Broducers
"Escondida"	2018	Broducers
"Opciones"	2018	Rodrigo Aroca
"Te La Dedico"	2018	Rodrigo Aroca
"Conmigo"	2019	Rodrigo Aroca
"Beautiful Mistake" (Lyric video)	2019	—N/a
"Opciones" (Vertical video)	2019	—N/a
"Vamos"	2019	Rodrigo Robles
"Me Voy Contigo"	2019	—N/a
"Polvo de Estrellas" (Animated video) (with AtellaGali)	2021	—N/a
"Antídoto" (with Anna Chase)	2021	—N/a
"Hot Damn" (Live One Take)	2021	—N/a
"Bad Karma" (Live One Take/Lyric video)	2021	—N/a
"La Culpa (Remix)" (with Lalo Brito)	2021	TEVAN
"Dime Que Regresarás" (with Grupo Cañaveral de Humberto Pabón)	2022	—N/a
"24/7" (with Hermanas JM)	2024	Carolina Dagach
"Polanco (Remix)" (with Ruggero)	2026	Kade Chance

== Tours ==
=== Headlining ===
- Conmigo Tour (2019)

=== Co-headlining ===
- Violetta en Vivo (2013–2014)
- Violetta Live 2015 International Tour (2015)

=== Opening act ===
- R5 – New Addictions Tour (2017)
- Sebastián Yatra – Sebastián Yatra Tour (2018)
- Tini – Quiero Volver Tour (2019)

== Awards and nominations ==
Year	Award	Category	Work	Result	Ref.
2013	Kids' Choice Awards Mexico	Favorite Actor	Violetta	Won	
2013	Kids' Choice Awards Argentina	Favorite TV Actor	Violetta	Nominated	
2014	Teen Weekly 2014	Favorite Actor	Violetta	Won	
2014	Kids' Choice Awards Colombia	Favorite Actor	Violetta	Won	
2014	Kids' Choice Awards Mexico	Favorite Actor	Violetta	Won	
