= Alba Rico =

Argentine actress, dancer and singer

- Born: Alba Rico Navarro
- Origin: Elda, Alicante, Spain
- Occupations: Actor, singer, model
- Years active: 2012–present
- Labels: Walt Disney Records

Alba Rico Navarro is a Spanish actress, singer and model. She is known for playing the role of Naty on the Disney Channel telenovela Violetta.

== Career ==
Her career started in 2012 with the role of Naty Vidal, on the telenovela Violetta. She played the role in all three seasons.

In 2013, she starred alongside her Violetta costars, in the Violetta en vivo Latin American tour and in 2015 in the European Violetta Live tour.

== Filmography ==
Year	Title	Role	Notes
2012–15	Violetta	Natalia "Naty" Vidal	Disney Channel Original Series
2014	Violetta: La emoción del concierto	Herself	concert documentary
2015	Violetta: The Journey	Herself	documentary
2019	Lope Enamorado	Clarilis	TV movie

== Discography ==
Soundtracks

- 2012: Violetta
- 2012: Cantar es lo que soy
- 2013: Hoy somos más
- 2013: Violetta en vivo
- 2014: Gira mi cancion
- 2015: Crecimos Juntos
