= Candelaria Molfese =

Argentine actress and singer (born 1991)

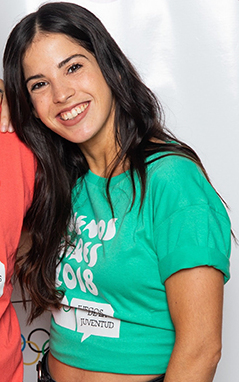
- Molfese in 2018
- Born: 3 January 1991 (age 35); Buenos Aires, Argentina
- Occupations: Actress; singer; presenter; YouTuber
- Years active: 2010–present
- Musical career
- Genres: Pop; teen pop
- Instrument: Vocals

María Candelaria "Cande" Molfese (born 3 January 1991) is an Argentine actress, vlogger, singer and television host who gained global fame for her role in the Disney Channel Latin America television series, Violetta.

== Early life ==
Molfese was born and raised in Buenos Aires and is the youngest child of five daughters. Her parents divorced when she was 12 years old. Her father later remarried and resides in Mexico City with her stepmother. She often visits Mexico City and regards as her second home.

She graduated high school from Colegio Nuestra Señora de la Misericordia in Buenos Aires, where she was responsible for creating harmony parts for the school's Catholic mass choir. As a young child, she expressed an interest in acting and art. Her mother allowed her to take dance and acting lessons when she was growing up. Despite her mother supporting her artistic endeavours, she was not allowed to attend castings nor pursue an acting career until she was a legal adult. Because of this, Molfese revealed that her childhood was normal and she has maintained friendships into adulthood with several childhood classmates.

One of her older sisters, Constanza, served as her manager when she was later hired as a professional actress. After graduating from high school, she studied musical comedy.

== Acting career ==
In 2010, Molfese had a role in the Argentine children's musical, Juntas y Revueltas. Performances were held in Buenos Aires.

She discovered information about auditions for the Argentine Disney tween musical television series, Violetta via the Argentine casting website, Alternativa Teatral in 2010. She lacked any professional acting credits, headshots, or a professional resume prior to her audition for Violetta. Instead, her older sister took two photographs of her and invented a resume of acting credits for Molfese to present at her audition. She credits the famous telenovelas produced by Cris Morena, as having a major influence on her decision to pursue an acting career.

Following a successful casting process, she was confirmed in late 2011 as a cast member for Violetta, which was co-produced by Disney Channel Latin America and the Argentine production company, Pol-ka. Filming for season one began in September 2011 in Buenos Aires. The series premiered on 12 May 2012 and aired globally in markets for three seasons. She also participated as a vocalist on the show's albums and as a performer in the two international concert tours: "Violetta en vivo" and "Violetta Live 2015 International Tour", held during breaks from filming the series. Molfese concluded filming the last season of Violetta during the final months of 2014 where production was held in Buenos Aires and Sevilla, Spain.

=== 2016–2019 ===
In November 2016, she was announced as a cast member of the Argentine comedy-drama telenovela, "Quiero vivir a tu lado". The telenovela filmed in Buenos Aires and later premiered in Argentina in January 2017 on El Trece. In 2017, Molfese returned to Disney Channel, where she co-starred in season 2 and 3 of the Argentine telenovela tween musical series, Soy Luna as "Ada".

In February 2019, Molfese was confirmed as a cast member in the musical-drama play, La Llamada, based on the popular Spanish play of the same name. The play premiered on 2 May 2019 in Buenos Aires. Molfese played the lead role, "María Casados"."

=== 2021 to present ===
Molfese filmed a role in the Argentine comedy film, Te pido un taxí in January 2019. In 2019, she was cast in the film, La sombra del gato, which starred Danny Trejo. The movie was filmed in 2019 but due to various production delays, it was not released until 2021. Molfese later appeared in the football-oriented Argentine television drama, Barrabrava. The show was produced by Amazon and later released worldwide on 23 June 2023. In 2024, she was cast in the Argentine political crime drama mini-series, El sabor del silenco. The series ran for 8 episodes and is about a chef who is responsible for the disappearance of a presidential candidate.

In January 2025, she appeared in the Argentine play, Escape Room, which premiered in Buenos Aires.

== Other ventures ==
On 15 November 2015, Molfese released her first book, Mundo Cande, featuring details about her family, beauty tips, and food-related content. As part of a promotional tour, she held a signing in Warsaw for the book's launch in late January 2016. The book has been published in Spanish and Polish. In late spring 2016, Molfese joined the cast of the popular Argentine teen-oriented web series, Fans en vivo, as a co-hostess, replacing former hostess, Jenny Martinez. Her debut episode with the series aired on 30 May 2016. The program films live in Buenos Aires every Monday, Wednesday, and Thursday and is available for streaming. Previously, Molfese worked on the website, "FWTV", as the host her own travel video blog, documenting the "Violetta" tours, and on separate cooking and lifestyle video series.

In August 2016, she starred in the Upload Project campaign with StandWithUs, and Israeli non-profit organisation, together with Sheryl Rubio, toured the cities of Tel Aviv and Jerusalem for a few days; the project aims to promote tourism in Israel.

In late 2018, she hosted the backstage, web series, #LadoV ("Side V" in English), for the reality singing competition, La Voz Argentina. Molfese was a fan of the U.S. version of The Voice, citing Miley Cyrus' appearance as a judge as a favourite moment of hers.

In 2022, she opened a franchise of the popular Scandinavian inspired café, Borja, in the Buenos Aires neighbourhood of Palermo. The cafe serves breakfast items, speciality coffee drinks, desserts, vegetarian, vegan, and gluten-free cuisine.

In December 2024, she won the first edition of Bake Off Famosos, an Argentine celebrity-oriented spinoff of the British reality programme, The Great British Bakeoff. The show was produced by and aired on Telefe from September to December 2024. Molfese was praised by the judges for her pastry skills and consistency throughout the competition. She won $30 million Argentine pesos (approximately $28,000 USD in January 2025) and revealed that she planned to use some of the prize money to take her sisters and their mother on a vacation to Miami.

== Personal life ==
Molfese maintains close friendships with her former Violetta co-stars, Clara Alonso, Alba Rico Navarro and Lodovica Comello. For several years, she ran a YouTube blogging series on her personal YouTube channel. Molfese became a vegetarian in 2017 and often shares recipes with fans through her social media platforms.

Molfese expressed in a 2023 interview with the Argentine media that she dealt with depression and stress once the series and international concert tours for Violetta ended in 2015 after 5 years. She credited therapy and the support of friends and family with helping her to adjust with returning to a "normal" life.

She was in a relationship with actor Ruggero Pasquarelli from 2014 to 2020. Despite rumours in the Argentine media that Pasquarelli had been violent during their relationship, Molfese denied the accusations and expressed that the relationship ended mutually on good terms.

She later dated actor, Gastón Soffritti for two years but they separated in 2024. They were previously engaged in 2023, but Molfese revealed that her relationship ended because Soffritti wanted children and she does not want children. She resides in the Saavedra neighbourhood of Buenos Aires.

== Filmography ==
Film roles
Year	Title	Role	Notes
2014	Violetta: en Concierto	Camilla Torres	Concert film
2019	Te pido un taxi	Belén	Comedy
2021	La sombra del gato	Brenda	Drama

Television/Web roles
Year	Title	Role	Notes
2012–2015	Violetta	Camilla Torres	Acting debut (3 seasons)
2016–2018	Fans en vivo	Herself/co-hostess	Live web series for Fansenvivo.tv
2016	Alba al Alba	Herself	Web series (Season 1, Episode 4: "La voz de la conciencia")
2017–2018	Soy Luna	Ada / Eva	Season 2 and Season 3
2017–2018	Quiero vivir a tu lado	Young Natalia Rouco	Recurring
2018	#LadoV	Herself/hostess	Backstage web series for La Voz Argentina seasons 2
2022	Solo Amor y Mil canciones	Herself	Special of Disney+ for 10 years of Violetta
2023	Barrabrava	Luciana	8 episodes
2024	El sabor del silencio	Andrea	Mini-series

=== Theatre ===
Year	Production	Role	Notes
2010	Juntas y revueltas		Children's musical
2019	La Llamada	María Casados	Musical/Drama; Argentine production of Spanish play, "La Llamada"
2025	Escape Room	Marina	Comedy

== Discography ==
=== Violetta soundtracks ===
Year	Song	Album
2012	"Algo suena en mí" (with Facundo Gambandé & Lodovica Comello)	Violetta
2012	"Juntos somos más" (with Mercedes Lambre, Facundo Gambandé & Lodovica Comello)	Violetta
2012	"Junto a ti" (with Martina Stoessel)	Violetta
2012	"Veo veo" (with Martina Stoessel & Lodovica Comello)	Violetta
2012	"Ven y canta" (with the cast of Violetta)	Violetta
2012	"Ti credo"	Violetta
2012	"Ser mejor" (with the cast of Violetta)	Cantar es lo que soy
2012	"Tienes el talento" (with the cast of Violetta)	Cantar es lo que soy
2013	"Código amistad" (with Martina Stoessel & Lodovica Comello)	Hoy somos más
2013	"Euforia" (with the cast of Violetta)	Hoy somos más
2013	"Alcancemos las estrellas" (with Martina Stoessel, Mercedes Lambre & Lodovica Comello)	Hoy somos más
2013	"On Beat" (with the cast of Violetta)	Hoy somos más
2013	"Algo se enciende" (with the cast of Violetta)	Hoy somos más
2013	"Esto no puede terminar" (with the cast of Violetta)	Violetta en vivo
2014	"En gira" (with the cast of Violetta)	Gira mi canción
2014	"Encender nuestra luz" (with Martina Stoessel, Mercedes Lambre, Lodovica Comello & Alba Rico)	Gira mi canción
2014	"Aprendí a decir adiós"	Gira mi canción
2014	"A mi lado" (with Martina Stoessel & Lodovica Comello)	Gira mi canción
2014	"Friends till the end" (with the cast of Violetta)	Gira mi canción
2015	"Crecimos juntos" (with the cast of Violetta)	Crecimos juntos
2015	"Es mi pasión" (with the cast of Violetta)	Crecimos juntos
2015	"Llámame" (with the cast of Violetta)	Crecimos juntos

=== Tours ===
- 2013–2014: "Violetta en vivo" (as principal cast member)
- 2015: "Violetta Live International" (as principal cast member)

== Awards and nominations ==
Year	Award	Category	Work	Result
2016	Kids' Choice Awards Argentina	Viral Moment	Ruggelaria (shared with Ruggero Pasquarelli)	Won
2017	Kids' Choice Awards Argentina	Trendy Girl	Herself	Nominated
2017	Tú Awards	#La parejita más cute	Candelaria Molfese & Ruggero Pasquarelli	Nominated
2018	Martín Fierro Awards	Digital Award for Best Thematic Content	Herself	Won
