= Facundo Gambandé =

Argentine actor, dancer and singer

- Born: January 10, 1990 (age 35); Córdoba, Argentina
- Genres: Pop
- Occupation(s): Actor, singer
- Years active: 2012–present
- Labels: Walt Disney Records

Facundo Gambandé (born January 10, 1990, in Córdoba, Argentina), is an Argentine actor and singer. He is known for playing the role of Maxi on the Disney Channel telenovela Violetta.

== Career ==
His career started in 2011 with the role of Maximiliano "Maxi" Ponte, on the telenovela Violetta. He played the role on all three seasons.

He has also participated in the four albums that the series launched: Violetta, Cantar es lo que soy, Hoy somos más and Violetta en vivo.

In 2013, he starred alongside his Violetta castmates, in the Violetta en vivo Latin American and European tour.

== Personal life ==
Gambandé is openly gay.

== Filmography ==
Year	Title	Character	Notes
2012–15	Violetta	Maximiliano "Maxi" Ponte	Disney Channel Original Series
2016	Educando a Nina	Leo	Telefe
2016–17	Por amarte asi	Santiago	Telefe
2019–20	Bia	Marcelo	Disney Channel
2020	A Skeleton in the Closet	Manuel	Dekkoo Channel
2021	Punto de quiebre	Faustino	UN3
2021	La Perla Negra	Dante	TBA

== Discography ==
Soundtracks

- 2012: Violetta
- 2012: Cantar es lo que soy
- 2013: Hoy somos más
- 2013: Violetta en vivo
- 2014: Gira mi cancion
- 2015: Crecimos Juntos
