= Samuel Nascimento =

Brazilian actor

- Born: 19 October 1990 (age 35); Guarulhos, São Paulo

Samuel Nascimento (born 19 October 1990) is a Brazilian actor, singer and dancer. He is known for playing Broduey in the series Violetta on Disney Channel.

== Life and career ==
He first began singing in his teens with his friends at the church which he attended with his family. He participated in several bands, in which he sang, danced, and played. He participated in the High School Musical: The Selection, and was among the 12 finalists to be part of the local version of High School Musical: The Challenge. He also played the role of DJ in the Brazilian series Quando Toca o Sino, which was inspired by the US version As the Bell Rings. From 2012 to 2015 he played the role of Broduey in the series of Disney Channel, Violetta.

== Filmography ==
Year	Title	Character	Notes
2003	Popstars	Himself	Contestant
2008	High School Musical: The Selection	Himself	Contestant
2009	High School Musical: The Challenge	Samuel	Co-star
2009–2011	Quando Toca O Sino	DJ	Primary Role
2012–2015	Violetta	Broduey	Co-star
2016	What a Talent!	Himself	Special participation
2016	Soy Luna	Santi Owen	Special participation
2019	Go! Live Your Way	Fabrício	

== Awards and nominations ==
Year	Award	Category	Production	Result
2013	Kids' Choice Awards Argentina	Favorite cast actor	Violetta	Winner
