= Loretta (disambiguation) =

Loretta is a given name.

Loretta may also refer to:

== Music ==
- Dead Loretta, a psychedelic rock band from Newark, Delaware, U.S.
- Get Back Loretta, a funk-rock group from San Diego, California, U.S.
- "Hey Loretta", a 1973 single by Loretta Lynn from the album Love Is the Foundation
- Loretta (album), 1980 album by Loretta Lynn
- "Loretta", a song by Iron & Wine from the 2015 album Archive Series Volume No. 1

== People ==
- Mark Loretta (born 1971), an American baseball player
- Loretta C. Van Hook (1852-1935), American missionary and educator

== Places ==
- Loretta (Warrenton, Virginia), or Edmonium, a historic home near Warrenton, Virginia, U.S.
- Loretta, Wisconsin, an unincorporated community in the town of Draper, Sawyer County, Wisconsin, U.S.

== Other uses ==
- 1939 Loretta, an asteroid discovered in 1974

== See also ==
- Loreto (disambiguation)
- Laura (disambiguation)
- Laurette (disambiguation)
