= Lauretta =

Lauretta is a feminine given name, which is probably derived from the name Laura. Notable people with the name include:

== People with the forename ==
- Lauretta Bender (1897–1987), American psychiatrist
- Lauretta Feldman (1935–2010), wife of Marty Feldman
- Lauretta Hannon (born 1968), American writer
- Lauretta Hanson (born 1994), Australian cyclist
- Lauretta E. Kress (1863–1955), Canadian-American obstetrician
- Lauretta Lamptey (born 1959), Ghanaian lawyer
- Lauretta Masiero (1929–2010), Italian actress
- Lauretta Ngcobo (1931–2015), South African writer
- Lauretta Schimmoler (1900–1981), American aviator
- Lauretta Vinciarelli (1943–2011), Italian architect
- Lauretta of Saarbrücken (died 1271), German countess

== People with the surname ==
- Damien Lauretta (born 1992), French singer-songwriter and actor
- Dante Lauretta (born 1970), American scientist
- Enzo Lauretta (1924–2014), Italian writer

== Fictional characters ==
- Lauretta, fictional character in the book The Decameron by Giovanni Boccaccio
- Lauretta, fictional character in the opera Gianni Schicchi by Giacomo Puccini

== See also ==
- Lauretta, Prince Edward Island
- Laura (given name)
- Loretta
