= Coretta (disambiguation) =

Coretta is an American thoroughbred which raced in 1998 and 1999.

Coretta or Corretta may also refer to:

Given name

- Coretta Scott King (1927–2006), wife of Martin Luther King, Jr.
- Coretta Brown (born 1980), basketball player
- Corretta Lipp, character in Ally McBeal played by Regina Hall
- Coretta "The Ox" Cox, character in The Steve Harvey Show played by The Lady of Rage

Other

- Coretta, Oklahoma, original name of Okay, Oklahoma

== See also ==
- La capricciosa corretta opera
- Loretta, similarly spelled female given name
- Corita, similarly spelled female given name
