= Laurette =

Laurette may refer to:

- Laurette (given name)
- Laurette (play), 1960 American play based on the life of Laurette Taylor and starring Judy Holliday
- Buckskin Joe, Park County, Colorado, a ghost town originally called Laurette
- Matthieu Laurette

== See also ==
- Loretta (disambiguation)
- Sailly-Laurette, a commune in France
