= Loretta =

Loretta is a female given name, the masculine version being Lauro. The name is a diminutive form of Lora, itself a form of Laura, which refers to the laurel tree, a symbol of victory. It is a name given by the Italians of Ancient Italy as a way to compliment beautiful girls, which, luckily, Loretta also means Beautiful, Pleasant or Kind Girl or Young Woman. .

This name is Italian in origin; it was popularized in the United States in the 1930s. It has many variant forms, including Laura, Lora, Loreen, Lorene, Lorinda/Laurinda (English), Lauretta, Loreta, Loritta, and Loreto (Italian).

== People with this name ==
- Loretta Bradley (born 1933), American professor
- Loretta de Braose, Countess of Leicester, (c. 1185-c. 1266)
- Loretta Carter Hanes (1926–2016), American educator, activist
- Loretta Chase (born Loretta Lynda Chekani, 1949), American writer
- Loretta Chen (born 1976), Singaporean theatre director and actor
- Loretta Claiborne, American global speaker who competes in the Special Olympics
- Loretta Devine (born 1949), American actress
- Loretta Doyle (born 1963), British judoka
- Loretta Goggi (born 1950), Italian singer, actress, television host, and dancer
- Loretta King Hadler (1917–2007), American actress
- Loretta Harrop (born 1975), Australian triathlete
- Loretta Huber, American poker player, World Series of Poker champion 1988
- Loretta Kelley, American fiddle player
- Loretta Long (born 1940), American actress
- Loretta Lux (born 1969), German fine art photographer working in Ireland
- Loretta Lynch (born 1959), Attorney General of the United States
- Loretta Lynn (born Loretta Webb; 1932–2022), American singer-songwriter
- Loretta McNeil (1907–1988), American athlete
- Loretta Nall, founder of the United States Marijuana Party
- Loretta Napoleoni (born 1955), Italian economist
- Loretta A. Preska (born 1949), American judge
- Loretta Sanchez (born 1960), U.S. Representative
- Loretta Ables Sayre (born 1958), American actress and singer
- Loretta Schafer (1917–1998), American nun
- Loretta Schrijver (1956–2025), Dutch television host
- Loretta Schwartz-Nobel, American journalist
- Loretta Spencer, American politician, former mayor of Huntsville, Alabama
- Loretta Swit (1937–2025), American actress
- Loretta Tofani (born 1953), American journalist
- Loretta Clemens Tupper (1906–1990), American singer
- Loretta Ucelli, American management advisor who served as Assistant to the President and Director of White House
- Loretta Perfectus Walsh (1896–1925), first American active-duty Navy woman
- Loretta Weinberg (born 1935), American politician
- Loretta Yang, performing artist in the Taiwan cinema
- Loretta Young (1913–2000), American actress

== Fictional characters ==
- Loretta, formerly Stan, in the film Monty Python's Life of Brian
- Loretta Brown in the American animated show Family Guy
- Loretta Callisto in the American animated show Miles from Tomorrowland
- Loretta Castorini, the main character in the film Moonstruck, played by Cher
- Loretta Jones in the British soap opera Hollyoaks
- Loretta Lynn, main character in Coal Miner's Daughter
- Loretta Tortelli in the American television show Cheers
- Loretta Wade in the American television show NCIS: New Orleans
- Loretta, a boss in the video game Elden Ring, also referred to as Loretta, Knight of the Haligtree
- Loretta, mother of Wade Watson in the novel Ready Player One by Ernest Cline
- Loretta Durkin, a character in the American television show Only Murders in the Building

== See also ==
- Letter to Loretta (also known as The Loretta Young Show), NBC television series
- Dead Loretta, psychedelic rock band from Newark, Delaware formed in 2004
- Laurette (given name)
