= Pablo Espinosa =

Spanish actor, singer and musician

- Born: Pablo Espinosa Doncel; March 10, 1992 (age 34); Villajoyosa, Spain
- Occupations: Actor; singer; musician
- Years active: 2008–present
- Television: La Pola (2010); Violetta (2012)
- Title: Pablo Espinosa
- Website: twitter.com/PabloEspOficial

Pablo Espinosa Doncel (born March 10, 1992) is a Spanish actor, singer and musician. He is best known for playing Ramiro in the Spanish series El Secreto De Puente Viejo and for playing Tomás in the first season of the Disney Channel television series Violetta.

== Career ==
Pablo Espinosa became known in the Antena 3 TV series Física o Química, in which he participated in the third and fourth season portraying the character of Pablo Calleja, a student at the Zurbarán.

His breakthrough as a television actor in 2010 under the direction of Sergio Cabrera overproduction in Colombia La Pola of RCN and Sony Pictures where he played the role of the adolescent protagonist, Alejo Sabaraín, teaming up with Colombian actress Ana María Estupiñán, which has gained considerable critical acclaim and a great applause from the audience.

In 2010, Espinosa participated in the cast of the film Clara, no es nombre de mujer Carbajo Pepe, which was released on June 29, 2012.

In 2011, Espinosa participated in the series production Ida y Vuelta El secreto de Puente Viejo to Antena 3 TV series set in the year 1902 in the role of Ramiro Castañeda, a young farmer.

Espinosa starred in the Disney Channel Original Series, Violetta, which was the first co-production between Disney Channel Latin America and Europe, Middle East and Africa, in collaboration with producer Argentina Pol-ka Producciones which filming began in September 2011, and was released in Latin America and Italy on May 14, 2012. Pablo Espinosa played Tomás Heredia.

In 2012, he was engaged to Argentine actress, singer and dancer Mercedes Lambre. In 2013, he was among the contestants of the Rai Uno talent show Altrimenti ci arrabbiamo, in which he arrived in a ballot, hosted by Milly Carlucci. The following year, he was in the main cast of the Spanish series Bienvenidos al Lolita portraying the character of Camilio.

In 2015, he returned to be part of the cast of El Secreto de Puente Viejo starting from episode 1138 after almost four years from his first appearance in the Antena 3 soap opera, until episode 1408 when he left the scene again.

In 2019, he portrayed the character of Paul in the Spanish short film Soul Man directed by Chema Ponze. The short film was released on digital platforms and DVD in 2020.

== Filmography ==
=== Films ===
Year	Title	Role	Notes
2012	Clara no es nombre de mujer	Elías	
2016	Ozzy	Mike	Voice role

=== Television ===
Year	Title	Role	Notes
2009	Física o química	Pablo Calleja	3 episodes
2010–11	La Pola	Alejandro Sabaraín	17 episodes
2011, 2015–2016	El secreto de Puente Viejo	Ramiro Castañeda	450 episodes
2012, 2013	Violetta	Tomás Heredia	Main role; 80 episodes (season 1); Archive footage; Season 2, Episode 2
2014	Bienvenidos al Lolita	Camilo	8 episodes
