= List of Violetta episodes =

The following is a list of episodes of the Disney Channel original series, Violetta. The series was released on 14 May 2012, and ended on 6 February 2015. During the course of the series, 240 episodes of Violetta aired over three seasons.

On Thursday January 22 and Friday January 23, 2015, Disney Channel Latin America premiered a special with R5. These two episodes were filmed in October 2014 when Ross Lynch and his brothers were on tour in Argentina.

As seen in the episode titles, almost all of them end with "una canción", meaning "a song" in Spanish. However, this series was made up by fans as the episodes had no official titles aside from Capítulo X (Chapter X).

== Series overview ==
Series	Episodes		Originally released		UK & Ireland First aired	UK & Ireland Last aired
Series	Episodes		First released	Last released	UK & Ireland First aired	UK & Ireland Last aired
1	80	40	14 May 2012	6 July 2012	22 July 2013	25 October 2013
1	80	40	3 September 2012	26 October 2012	4 November 2013	28 August 2014
2	80	40	29 April 2013	21 June 2013	1 June 2015	10 July 2015
2	80	40	19 August 2013	11 October 2013	11 July 2015	19 August 2015
3	80	20	28 July 2014	22 August 2014	4 July 2016	29 July 2016
3	80	20	22 September 2014	17 October 2014	1 August 2016	26 August 2016
3	80	20	17 November 2014	12 December 2014	30 August 2016	12 December 2016
3	80	20	12 January 2015	6 February 2015	13 December 2016	1 January 2017

== Season 1 (2012) ==
No. overall	No. in season	Title	Original air date (Latin America)	Original air date (UK & Ireland)
Su destino es hoy (in English "Her fate is now")
1	1	"Dreams"	14 May 2012	22 July 2013
2	2	"Chance"	15 May 2012	22 July 2013
3	3	"Love"	16 May 2012	23 July 2013
4	4	"Rivality"	17 May 2012	24 July 2013
5	5	"Friendly"	18 May 2012	25 July 2013
6	6	"Studio 21"	21 May 2012	29 July 2013
7	7	"The shame of its life"	22 May 2012	30 July 2013
8	8	"Angie vs Jade"	23 May 2012	31 July 2013
9	9	"BFF"	24 May 2012	1 August 2013
10	10	"Music"	25 May 2012	2 August 2013
11	11	"You and me"	28 May 2012	5 August 2013
12	12	"Lie to do good"	29 May 2012	6 August 2013
13	13	"Thank you"	30 May 2012	7 August 2013
14	14	"Secret"	31 May 2012	8 August 2013
15	15	"Her fate is now"	1 June 2012	9 August 2013
16	16	"Jealous"	4 June 2012	12 August 2013
17	17	"Usually "dad""	5 June 2012	13 August 2013
18	18	"Impossible Love"	6 June 2012	14 August 2013
19	19	"Singing competition"	7 June 2012	15 August 2013
20	20	"Make a friend suffer..."	8 June 2012	16 August 2013
21	21	"A song for her"	11 June 2012	19 August 2013
22	22	"You was born to dream"	12 June 2012	20 August 2013
23	23	"A fatal fruit juice"	13 June 2012	21 August 2013
24	24	"Beautiful"	14 June 2012	22 August 2013
25	25	"The reaction of Tomas"	15 June 2012	23 August 2013
26	26	"Plot"	18 June 2012	26 August 2013
27	27	"Meeting really surprised"	19 June 2012	27 August 2013
28	28	"Grandmother?"	20 June 2012	28 August 2013
29	29	"Model"	21 June 2012	29 August 2013
30	30	"Second chance"	22 June 2012	30 August 2013
31	31	"Audition"	25 June 2012	14 October 2013
32	32	"Goodbye, everybody"	26 June 2012	15 October 2013
33	33	"Accidents volunteer"	27 June 2012	16 October 2013
34	34	"Kiss"	28 June 2012	17 October 2013
35	35	"A work"	29 June 2012	18 October 2013
36	36	"Passion"	2 July 2012	21 October 2013
37	37	"Jade discovers everything"	3 July 2012	22 October 2013
38	38	"I am only a point"	4 July 2012	23 October 2013
39	39	"Tomas or Leon?"	5 July 2012	24 October 2013
40	40	"Show"	6 July 2012	25 October 2013
Violetta está cambiando (in English "Violetta's changing")
41	41	"Talk If You Can"	3 September 2012	4 November 2013
42	42	"The Pact"	4 September 2012	5 November 2013
43	43	"Bad Partition"	5 September 2012	6 November 2013
44	44	"Hard luck!"	6 September 2012	7 November 2013
45	45	"Fright"	7 September 2012	11 November 2013
46	46	"The Anger of Francesca"	10 September 2012	12 November 2013
47	47	"Kisses of Birthday"	11 September 2012	13 November 2013
48	48	"Pirate or Princess ?"	12 September 2012	14 November 2013
49	49	"Misunderstandings"	13 September 2012	18 November 2013
50	50	"Duets"	14 September 2012	19 November 2013
51	51	"The Duel"	17 September 2012	20 November 2013
52	52	"The Official reception of all the dangers"	18 September 2012	21 November 2013
53	53	"Upside down"	19 September 2012	25 November 2013
54	54	"Locked"	20 September 2012	26 November 2013
55	55	"TV reality"	21 September 2012	27 November 2013
56	56	"Maxata"	24 September 2012	28 November 2013
57	57	"Federico"	25 September 2012	2 December 2013
58	58	"Intended to shine"	26 September 2012	3 December 2013
59	59	"Inscription"	27 September 2012	4 December 2013
60	60	"Talent 21"	28 September 2012	5 December 2013
61	61	"Observed by everywhere 1st part"	1 October 2012	28 July 2014
62	62	"Observed by everywhere 2nd part"	2 October 2012	29 July 2014
63	63	"Popularity"	3 October 2012	30 July 2014
64	64	"A vote to change everything"	4 October 2012	31 July 2014
65	65	"The wheel turns"	5 October 2012	4 August 2014
66	66	"Taken in his own trap"	8 October 2012	5 August 2014
67	67	"No flea for Castillo"	9 October 2012	6 August 2014
68	68	"Manipulation"	10 October 2012	7 August 2014
69	69	"Dilemma"	11 October 2012	11 August 2014
70	70	"Violetta is the winner ?"	12 October 2012	12 August 2014
71	71	"The truth comes out on Angie"	15 October 2012	13 August 2014
72	72	"Memories"	16 October 2012	14 August 2014
73	73	"We can..."	17 October 2012	18 August 2014
74	74	"Courage and Bitterness"	18 October 2012	19 August 2014
75	75	"No respites for Jade"	19 October 2012	20 August 2014
76	76	"A difficult choice has to make"	22 October 2012	21 August 2014
77	77	"Ultimatum"	23 October 2012	25 August 2014
78	78	"Goodbye the music..."	24 October 2012	26 August 2014
79	79	"Violetta and Tomas's kiss"	25 October 2012	27 August 2014
80	80	"In my own world"	26 October 2012	28 August 2014

== Season 2 (2013) ==
No. overall	No. in season	Title	Original air date Latin America	Original air date UK & Ireland
Todo vuelve a comenzar (in English "Everything begins again")
81	1	"Everything begins again"	29 April 2013	1 June 2015
As their vacation draws to an end, the kids are ready to start a new year at the Studio. Violetta reflects on the changes in her life and decides to talk to Leon about singing at the YouMix party. At the party, a new boy enters Violetta's life. First Appearance of: Diego, Lara and Jackie
82	2	"New pretender"	30 April 2013	2 June 2015
Violetta is angry when Diego causes trouble between her and Leon, and Francesca meets a big fan of hers and falls for him. First Appearance of: Marco
83	3	"Complicities"	1 May 2013	3 June 2015
Leon gets angry when Diego sings "No More Tears" to Violetta, causing him to question his feelings for her.
84	4	"Jade has a plan"	2 May 2013	4 June 2015
Jade hires an actress to make German fall in love with her and then steal his money, but will it work?
85	5	"Accident"	3 May 2013	5 June 2015
German and Esmeralda meet at a cafe, and Herman is immediately impressed. Angie decides to leave the Castillo house, saying she has no place. Violetta goes to the motor-cross to talk to Leon, but Diego shows up, and because of this, Leon has an accident.
86	6	"Vengeance"	6 May 2013	6 June 2015
Leon is in hospital after his accident and Violetta is worried about his condition. Diego apologizes for making trouble and tells her that he only wants to get to know her. When Leon finally answers Violetta's calls, he tells her that they should just be friends and she reluctantly agrees. Diego sees Violetta working on a song and gives her some lyrics to use.
87	7	"Surpaser"	7 May 2013	7 June 2015
DJ and Camila are locked in the janitor's closet and Broadway comes to release them and sees them together, which makes him jealous. Broadway and Camila have an argument after that. Leon's ankle is still sore, but it has gotten a lot better. Violetta tries to tell him about Diego's lyrics but is too scared and decides to keep it a secret for now.
88	8	"Good Presentation"	8 May 2013	8 June 2015
German "forgets" about Leon's message for Violetta, causing her to miss their date. Violetta sees through Herman's lie and is furious at him for being so childish. Jackie finally asks Pablo to be her boyfriend, and he accepts. However, he wants to keep it a secret for now, to avoid trouble with Gregorio. Camila accidentally tells Leon about Diego finishing Violetta's song during their dance practice. Leon is furious and goes to confront Violetta.
89	9	"Did Ludmila really change ?"	9 May 2013	9 June 2015
Leon is angry with Violetta for lying to him about the lyrics of her song and Violetta is angry with Camila for telling him about it. Naty stands up to Ludmila. The students are asked to perform for the mayor and his daughter, Emma. But this causes a lot of fights between the students. In the end, they perform "Always Dancing" together. Angie sees Pablo and Jackie kissing and immediately gets jealous. Beto asks Gregorio to help him write a poem for Jackie, but she finds it childish and funny. Emma and Andres go out on a date.
90	10	"Pygama Party"	10 May 2013	10 June 2015
Violetta decides that she want to hold a sleepover not knowing that Ludmila is plotting to ruin it. Ludmila sent an email pretending to be anonymous to the people changing the location of the party to Violetta's house. Esmeralda and Herman go on a date to a fancy restaurant when Herman is about to pay the waiter The waiter announces that he has no money left in the bank, so Esmeralda and German head home. Meanwhile, Diego enters Violetta’s room telling her that there is a party downstairs at first Violetta did not believe him. Violetta heads downstairs confused when Leon enters thinking that the reason she hadn't been answering his calls because she was with Diego. But to make matters worse, Herman enters the house angry with Violetta and demands that everyone leaves.
91	11	"Bridgit Mendler comes to the Studio!"	13 May 2013	11 June 2015
Antonio has a surprise for the students. Antonio enters the room with Bridgit Mendler, a famous actress, and introduces her to all of the students.Together, the students and Bridgit sing Hurricane. Special Guest Star: Bridgit Mendler
92	12	"German's arrest"	14 May 2013	12 June 2015
Herman is arrested and Violetta is very upset, so all her friends go to her house to comfort her. Violetta suggests that she and Leon should get back together. Both Violetta and Leon are not happy when they find out that Diego is auditioning for the Studio.
93	13	"Wars between Léon and Diego"	15 May 2013	13 June 2015
Diego auditions for the Studio with a song called "Be Mine", which he wrote about Violetta.
94	14	"New students"	16 May 2013	14 June 2015
Diego and Marco get admitted into the studio, unfortunately, DJ does not get in, this makes him really upset. Meanwhile, Leon is furious that Diego got admitted.
95	15	"Assistant"	17 May 2013	15 June 2015
Leon and Violetta go on a date, as they both lean in for a kiss Violetta's phone rings. Esmeralda tells Violetta to return home as fast as she can. Violetta returns home confused about why she had to be rushed home. Herman enters the house telling her that they need to leave the house within 24 hours.
96	16	"When we owe go away..."	20 May 2013	16 June 2015
Violetta decides to leave the Studio, which makes everyone upset. Angie returns to the Studio after being fired by Pablo, Pablo is furious but is told by Antonio that Angie has to stay. The police tell Herman and Violetta have to leave their house within 24 hours in order to pay Herman's bail. The judge believes that it was Herman who deliberately transferred his money to another country, not knowing that it is Matias and Jade. Francesca, Camila, and Ludmila arrive at Violetta's house to help her pack for the hotel, but while Violetta is downstairs getting snacks, Diego arrives looking for her. Francesca and Camila get very angry with him and demand that he leaves, but suddenly Leon also arrives at the house and Francesca and Camila hide Diego in the closet, hoping Leon won't see him.
97	17	"Seize the opportunity"	21 May 2013	17 June 2015
Violetta and Herman leave the house when they are stopped by Esmeralda, Esmeralda offers her money to Herman but he doesn't accept. Violetta suggests that Esmeralda should come and live with her and Herman, this makes Angie very angry. Angie talks to Antonio and gets given a scholarship for Violetta so that she can return to the Studio.
98	18	"The video"	22 May 2013	18 June 2015
Violetta and Diego are told to practice their duet for the show, not knowing that Diego is recording the whole thing. Diego leans in for a kiss and Violetta pushes away, being faithful to the relationship she has with Leon. Francesca, Camila, and Marco try to show the video to Violetta, but the memory card is missing.
99	19	"Scene of jealousy"	23 May 2013	19 June 2015
Herman is angry when he sees Violetta and Diego almost kiss in the rehearsal, but Pablo manages to calm him down. Violetta is annoyed at Herman for embarrassing her but Esmeralda reassures her by quoting María. Violetta thinks it's a sign that Esmeralda is the right one for Herman.
100	20	"Diego dashes"	24 May 2013	20 June 2015
It's the day of the show, and Violetta is very anxious. Ludmila dresses as Violetta and disconnects all the cables so that Violetta will get kicked out of the show and Ludmila can take her place. The show begins, Ludmila sings "Right Now", then all the students sing "Euphoria". Violetta and Diego sing "Be Mine" for their duet, but in the end, Violetta trips and Diego catches her, taking an advantage to kiss her. Leon is furious and thinks Violetta tripped on purpose.
101	21	"Scandal"	27 May 2013	21 June 2015
Violetta is furious with Diego for kissing her. Leon refuses to talk to Violetta in punishment for the kiss between her and Diego. Herman is also angry and he finds it hard to trust Violetta anymore, so he plans to wear a disguise so that he can spy on Violetta.
102	22	"The star of You-Mix"	28 May 2013	22 June 2015
Leon breaks up with Violetta after he saw what happened between her and Diego. Violetta tries to explain exactly what happened when Diego kissed her but Leon doesn't want to listen to her.
103	23	"Bad in French"	29 May 2013	23 June 2015
Violetta lays down Leon lightly. Gregorio hides and defends Naty's secret about framing Jackie. Camila apologizes to Maxi for being mean to him and tells him that he means a lot to her, as a friend. Violetta accepts the offer from YouMix. Ludmila declares that no one listens to her, and she's upset that she wasn't chosen for YouMix. Francesca gives Leon a pep-talk about Violetta and tries to make him change his mind about her.
104	24	"No choice"	30 May 2013	24 June 2015
Violetta does not like the look YouMix has given her, she talks to Marotti but he says that her new look is larger and much better, but Violetta will not listen. Diego wants to prove at any cost that Violetta has changed. Violetta does not believe him and even less Leon. Meanwhile, Esmeralda has a daughter (Ambar) and the Herman insists that they both come to live with him. Esmeralda accepts and Ambar and Esmeralda move in.
105	25	"A party without Violetta"	31 May 2013	25 June 2015
Broadway and the band are invited to attend a party and perform there. Andres asks Lara to attend the party and she does much to Leon's surprise. Maxi begins to feel something for Camila. Diego turns up at Violetta's house dressed as a clown.
106	26	"Be Better"	3 June 2013	26 June 2015
Violetta returns to the Studio. She tells Francesca and Camila that Diego came to her house. They promise not to say anything, not knowing that Andres is listening. He later tells Leon who gets angry. Meanwhile, Ludmila filmed Lara and Leon dancing together and shows Violetta. Violetta thinks that this is the reason that he did not want her to come to the party. He replied that he did not know that Lara would come to the party, and pointed out that she had spent the evening with Diego. Violetta said that she didn't know he was coming. Leon does not believe her, so Violetta just turned away. Meanwhile, Camila and Maxi kiss in a carriage and realize that they don't feel anything for each other.
107	27	"One more in Violetta's heart"	4 June 2013	27 June 2015
Violetta does not like the look that Marotti has given her, so she convinces him to let her be herself. Later, she overhears a conversation between Diego and Leon. Leon says some hurtful words about Violetta which makes her upset and Diego tries to comfort her. Violetta tells Francesca and Camila that maybe Diego has changed, and Camila tells Francesca that she kissed Maxi.
108	28	"Battle"	5 June 2013	28 June 2015
Violetta dreams about Leon. After, apologising to Olga and Ramallo, Ambar leaves to live with her father and tells her mother not to hurt Violetta and Herman because they are nice people. Marco and Francesca argue with each other.
109	29	"Disappointment"	6 June 2013	29 June 2015
Violetta phones to ask Leon if he is dating Lara, and he replied no. But in the end, Violetta sees Leon and Lara together and thinks Leon lied to her.
110	30	"The voice which goes off the rails"	7 June 2013	30 June 2015
Violetta sees Leon and Lara together and presumes they're dating. She gets jealous and confronts Leon, thinking he lied to her.
111	31	"The vice tightens"	10 June 2013	1 July 2015
Esmeralda follows German and saw him enter a Chinese restaurant where she saw him as a kitchen helper. Francesa believes that Violetta and Diego are dating. She then confronts Leon and tells him to go after Violetta and tells him not to give up and that she hates Diego. Leon walks away. Violetta loses her voice.
112	32	"All against León"	11 June 2013	2 July 2015
Violetta seems to fall in love with Diego. Esmeralda wants to join Herman at the Chinese restaurant where she believes he works. Violetta is sure Leon is dating Lara but he denies it. After having an argument with Leon, Violetta falls and sprains her ankle, but Leon does not see her falling. Diego passes by chance and sees Violetta and comes to her aid. Violetta returns home with Diego, Diego explains what happened and states that it is all Leon's fault, also saying that the relationship between Violetta and Leon was the accident. In posing Jeremiah, Herman calls Leon who does not understand why everyone turns against him. Then later Leon decides to go talk to Violetta who does not understand why Jeremiah defended her. Leon believes that Violetta wants to get everyone in the studio against him. Leon thinks that it would be best if he leaves the studio to devote himself fully to the bike. He comes to the party organized by Francesca with Lara, making Francesca very angry. Violetta has to make a recording for U-Mix therefore, Marotti prevents Violetta from going to Francesca's party, threatening her career.
113	33	"Francesca's birthday"	12 June 2013	3 July 2015
It is Francesca's birthday, but Violetta has to record a song for U-Mix. Leon invites Lara to the party, but everyone thinks that he brought Lara to make Violetta jealous. Violetta was not able to go to Francesca's birthday party as she had to record a song. Lara goes before the end of the party as she also thinks that Leon invited her to make Violetta jealous. To prove Lara that he didn't bring her to the party to make Violetta jealous, Leon kisses Lara.
114	34	"Since You Want"	13 June 2013	4 July 2015
Violetta goes to Francesca's birthday party, but nobody is there. She is upset and tries to ring Francesca but she doesn't answer any of her calls. She sleeps with a heavy heart. That evening, she dreamed of Leon and she suddenly awoke. She smiled, the words she had said in her dream gave her an idea of song. The next day, while she composed the famous song that words had inspired, Francesca comes to see Violetta. The girls could not sing at the party Francesca, so the students decide to give them a surprise. When Violetta and Francesca arrive, they see Camilla on stage and everyone told they must sing. They sing Friendship Code, but when it is the turn of Violetta, her voice starts to go. Francesca notices and pretended not to feel good while falling. Ludmila and Diego have a plan to break Violetta's heart.While speaking to Pablo, Diego takes Leon's phone and messages Lara telling her to come to the Studio, Lara jumps for joy and arrives immediately. Diego tells Lara that Leon is in the choir room. Meanwhile, Ludmila tells Violetta that she wants to show her something and takes her to the choir room, but when she arrives, she sees Lara and Leon kissing.
115	35	"Problem of voice"	07:00, 14 June 2013	5 July 2015
After seeing Leon and Lara kiss, Violetta decides that she needs to clear her head. Diego asks Violetta if she would like to make pizza with him at the Castillo household. She agrees, and while they're kneading dough, they start throwing flour and chasing each other. At the same time, Leon arrives to see Violetta and gets jealous about her having fun with Diego. She tells Leon that their relationship shouldn't have ended and that their love was very strong. Leon tells Violetta that their love was not strong and that she has forgotten about what she had done. Violetta is sad because of what Leon said. The next day she apologizes to Diego who accepts her apology immediately. Meanwhile, a new student from Israel arrives at the Studio. Her name is Libi, and Andres is immediately interested in her.
116	36	"Too much disappointment for Violetta 1st part"	17 June 2013	6 July 2015
Violetta and Leon are about to talk when they see Lara standing right behind them. Violetta asks Leon if he knows why Lara's there, Leon replies that they are on a date. Violetta apologizes to Leon and runs off. Lara gets jealous and walks away from her date with Leon. Ludmila nags at Diego to get Violetta out of the studio. Diego tells Ludmila that Violetta's days are numbered at the studio, but she says that she's heard it before. Ludmila tells Diego that he's wasting her time and not getting the job done quick enough. Leon goes over to Violetta's house and tells her that the relationship between him and her is over and that he's officially dating Lara. After eavesdropping on Violetta and Leon, Herman complains to Ramallo about it. Ramallo tells the truth to Herman and says that he always pushes Violetta too hard. Marotti announces that the mayor has changed his mind, and the show is back on once more.
117	37	"Too much disappointment for Violetta 2nd part"	18 June 2013	7 July 2015
Hearing Diego talk on the phone about her, Violetta fools Diego by pretending that she didn't hear anything and that she only forgot something in the classroom. Jade forces Herman to tell Esmeralda that he got fired from the job at the restaurant. Ludmila picks on Violetta and gets an idea in her head that Violetta lip-synced her whole show. Herman tells Violetta that he won't be able to see her show. Meanwhile, Ludmila and Diego trade threats about what they know about each other. Matias tells Jade that there are plenty other men for her out there, but she refuses and says that she wants Herman. Violetta doesn't understand how Leon can forget her so quickly.
118	38	"Too much disappointment for Violetta 3rd part"	19 June 2013	8 July 2015
Whilst singing How Do You Want (Me To Love You), Violetta has a vision about her and Leon. This makes her stop singing half way through the first chorus. Diego comes in and tells Violetta that she must try to forget Leon, but she says that it's hard to forget anyone. Violetta confides in Francesca.
119	39	"A kiss to change everything"	20 June 2013	9 July 2015
Leon tells Lara that he's going to do the Studio's show and she says that he can't be in two places at once. Violetta has a dream about her and Leon. They end up getting calls from each other which they find quite strange. Herman tells Violetta that it's always worth to love someone with all your heart. Ludmila once again nags Diego to get Violetta out of the studio. Diego feels upset about not knowing who his father is and Violetta tries to comfort him. Angie tries to visit Jeremiah, but the address is false. The episode ends with Diego and Violetta having a romantic kiss.
120	40	"On Beat"	21 June 2013	10 July 2015
Violetta is worried that without her shoes, she cannot do the show. Lara tells Leon that she's not going to make him chose between music and motocross. Diego tells Ludmila that he kissed Violetta. Angie arrives on time to give Violetta her shoes.
Un sueño a todo volumen (in English "A dream out loud")
121	41	"A dream out loud"	19 August 2013	11 July 2015
Violetta loses her voice after singing too much during the show. So she decides to quickly go home to get a doctor's phone number. After finding out Ludmila's plan, Naty confronts Ludmila and they have an argument. Matías goes missing, forcing Jade and Esmeralda to decide whether or not they should tell Herman the truth.Olga gets engaged and then Ramallo and her have a fight after he tells her that he loves her after all this time. Francesca tells Marco that she is moving back to Italy. Andres is upset because Libby is gone. Diego is getting frustrated since Violetta is ignoring him, even though the reasons why she's ignoring him is because she lost her voice and doesn't want anyone to know. Marco is finding ways to make Francesca. Camila finds out that she is leaving. Violetta has a dream of her father telling her that she's getting a voice operation, but she won't be able to sing again. This makes Violetta very scared. Olga breaks up with Cardozo.
122	42	"A decisive answer"	20 August 2013	12 July 2015
Violetta's voice hasn't come back yet. At the studio, Pablo tells Leon that he has to decide between the studio or bikes. Olga and Cardozo say their goodbyes. Violetta goes to the doctor with Marotti. It turns out that Violetta lost her voice because she's tired and she only needs rest, however they are not sure if she will be able to sing again. Violetta is worried about her relationship with Diego, because she doesn't want to hurt him. Herman proposes to Esmeralda and she accepts. When Violetta wakes up, she finds out that her voice is back. Esmeralda tells Jade to get out of the country as she is too. Matias reappears. Violetta overhears Camila and Francesca talking about her leaving.
123	43	"The return of Jeremias"	21 August 2013	13 July 2015
Violetta's heart is broken when she finds out that one of her best friends is leaving. Leon decides to leave the studio, so Pablo desperate to makes him stay at the studio, lets him continue with his motor cross and singing at the same time. Esmeralda is caught with a suitcase about to leave by Herman. He convinces her not to leave. Maxi is trying to discover Ludmila and Naty's secret because it's about Violetta. Lara confronts Violetta and asks her if she is still in love with Leon. Before she could answer, Leon interrupts.
124	44	"On the voice of the secret"	22 August 2013	14 July 2015
When Angie and Jeremiah (German in disguise) are having lunch at the Chinese restaurant German was banned from, Angie leaves the table for a minute because she spotted Violetta and Diego and she wanted to say hi, Jeremias gets kicked out of the restaurant as the servers recognised him. Esmeralda requests to have a part of Herman's fortune in her account, just in case Matias decide to leave again. Violetta tells Diego why she ignored him for the last couple of days and they promise not to lie to each other anymore. Esmeralda and Herman decide to have an engagement party. Marketing people at YouMix want to hear Violetta sing, therefore Marotti says that she should lip-sync. Violetta isn't sure about it when she tells her friends, Ludmila overhears. And she plans to sabotage Violetta by swapping the CDs (from the one with her voice to the one without her voice) exposing her and proving that she is lip-syncing. Herman wants to meet a couple of Esmeralda's friends, so she asks help to jade and Matias (mostly Matias). Diego decides to cause trouble between Leon and Lara so he confronts Leon and asks why was he singing to Violetta during the exercise given from Pablo.
125	45	"Group therapy"	23 August 2013	15 July 2015
Violetta hears the music and just stands there. She feels embarrassed, so she flees the room. Ludmila quickly takes action and decide to sing instead of her. Lara stands up for Leon and tells Diego that she doesn't care who Leon sings to. Gregorio quits after being teased too much by Jackie. Herman sneaks into Violetta's room and finds her medical prescription to put her to the test she asks Violetta to sing for him to see if she would lie to him. Maxi is upset when he finds out that Naty and Ludmila sabotaged Violetta. Lara and Leon keep on getting closer and closer. Ludmila is mad at Diego because she thinks that he's falling in love with Violetta. Diego thinks she is jealous. Pablo only gives Ludmila one chance to stay at the studio. Esmeralda and Matias are casting actresses to be Esmeralda's "friends and family members". The teachers cannot stop fighting so in order to stop this Antonio needs to take to drastic measures that he did not want to come to. He puts the teacher under group therapy. Violetta's doctor comes to visit and tells her that she got her voice ultimately. Violetta's dad forbids her to sing again. Final Appearance of: Jackie
126	46	"Federico returns"	26 August 2013	16 July 2015
Violetta's dad tell her that she has gone too far and put her health in danger. She is not allowed to continue with YouMix. Diego sees Leon ears dropping so he and Ludmila decide to put an act on. Violetta tells Marotti that her father doesn't want her to pursue with YouMix. Ludmila back stabs Violetta and asks to take her place, unfortunate for her she gets rejected. Federico comes back. The fame has gone to his head a bit but he's still nice. He encounters Ludmila and starts flirting with her. Marotti has got his lawyers involved since Herman won't let Violetta sing for YouMix. Esmeralda just got news that Jade is missing and she gets really worried.
127	47	"Do not leave..."	27 August 2013	17 July 2015
Pablo accidentally drops Gregorio to catch Angie during a trust exercise, injuring Gregorio's shoulder in the process. Pablo and Jackie break up.Francesca gets more upset the more the days pass. She keeps on doubting herself. Camila and Violetta are really worried. Herman tells Jade that they are never getting back together. Marotti tells Violetta that, to get out of the contract they have to pay a fine (and money is the last thing they have). Jade, heartbroken from the rejection, decides to change her personality good into bad. Ludmila is starting to daydream about Federico especially when he starts singing for a fan at the park. Even though she still insults him to hide her feelings.
128	48	"Ah the love..."	28 August 2013	18 July 2015
Naty notices Ludmila's interest for Federico. Violetta presents Angie's song.
129	49	"Settled Diego everything"	29 August 2013	19 July 2015
Ludmila destroys Camila's tablet because it contained a video of her obviously in love with Federico.
130	50	"Difficult farewells"	30 August 2013	20 July 2015
Francesca is leaving for Italy, much to the dismay of her friends. However, they have a plan to convince her father to let her stay, but will they succeed?
131	51	"Francesca's Departure 1st part"	2 September 2013	21 July 2015
Though Carlos is moved to hear his daughter sing, Francesca has to return to Italy with her family. Lara wants to leave Leon and focus on her career after he calls her Violetta. Feeling sad following her best friend's departure, Violetta finds comfort in Leon.
132	52	"Francesca's Departure 2nd part"	3 September 2013	22 July 2015
After hearing Violetta talk about his daughter, Carlos allows Francesca to stay in Bueno Aires with her aunt and uncle. Lena visit's Naty at the Studio and enrages Ludmila. Violetta goes to see Leon at his house. She tells him she still loves him and wants to be with him, as long as he tells her they still have a chance. Without a response, she leaves heartbroken.
133	53	"The guitar"	4 September 2013	23 July 2015
Naty's sister Lena comes visiting while their parents are away. Camila bumps into Seba from the Rock Bones, begins to crush on him, and then argues with him for making fun of her catalog of potential boyfriends. Guest Star: Rock Bones
134	54	"Complementary stars"	5 September 2013	24 July 2015
Marco, Maxi, and Lena take advantage of Ludmila's crush on Federico to make Ludmila a nicer person.
135	55	"Nata se hiere"	6 September 2013	25 July 2015
Ludmila switches Federico and Andres' demoes causing Marotti to almost send Federico back to Italy.
136	56	"The resignation of Jackie"	9 September 2013	26 July 2015
Jackie quits her job, leaving the teacher's confused, and making Antonio upset at Pablo. Diego makes it seem like Leon broke the guitar Violetta got him out of jealousy, in order to make Violetta hate Leon and cover the true culprit, Ludmila.
137	57	"The ex that we saw coming"	10 September 2013	27 July 2015
After Naty fell down from her chair, her hand is damaged, meaning that she won't be able to play. The girls have a plan, and they use Seba from Rock Bones, disguised as Naty, as their drum player. Meanwhile, Marco's ex-girlfriend comes to Buenos Aires to attend the Studio, causing problems for Marco, since Ana thinks that he doesn't have a girlfriend. Ludmila and Federico are getting closer and almost share a kiss until they're interrupted. Ludmila finds out about the plan about Seba pretending to be Naty, and when Ludmila tries to reveal it, Naty is back on stage, playing like never before. Leon tries to explain to Violetta what happens, but when he does Lara shows up. In return, Violetta warns Lara that Leon is the worst person she knows and she should stay away from him as well.
138	58	"Mass lies"	11 September 2013	28 July 2015
Lara decides to follow Violetta's advice and stay away from Leon. The studio is happy to welcome College 11, a Brazilian band. Herman pushes Jade out of the wedding. In the meantime, Marco's ex-girlfriend, Ana, comes back from Mexico and causes problems between Francesca and him. Leon tries to set up a trap to catch Diego and Ludmila in their plan, but Violetta stops him before they can start talking. Guest Star: College 11
139	59	"Wedding"	12 September 2013	29 July 2015
German almost gets unmasked as Jeremias, when he calls Violetta "his daughter" when he sees Diego, Violetta and Leon fighting. Violetta confesses to him, as Jeremias, that she can't get over Leon. Seba has to go on tour with the Rock bones, but promises to Camila that he will not forget her while he is gone. Matias wants to hire the mechanic as the judge to marry German and Esmeralda but he declines, It's also the day of German and Esmeralda's wedding, but what will happen? The winning band for YouMix is Violetta's and Ludmilla gets angry.
140	60	"Betrayal more"	13 September 2013	30 July 2015
Jade reveals who Esmeralda is, and she runs away from the wedding. Ramallo and the others try to stop her, but without success. This makes Herman realize that you can't get anywhere with a lie, which leads him to quit his job on the Studio. At the Studio, it's the day of the band contest. Someone posts an old video of Leon serenading to Violetta on the YouMix site, bringing up old feelings for the two. Lara comes to watch Leon, which leads to a "love square" of Diego, Leon, Lara and Violetta. In the end, Violetta, Francesca, Camila and Naty win the contest. At the end of the episode, Angie finds out that Jeremiah is actually Herman. Final Appearance of: Esmeralda
141	61	"Finally unmasked?"	16 September 2013	31 July 2015
At the studio, Diego, Andres, and Broadway want to form a band but Leon isn't sure and says he'll think about it. Ludmila shows Violetta a video of Leon kissing Lara after he won his race, and Violetta says she doesn't want to think about Leon, talk about Leon or hear about Leon. Angie announces to Pablo that she thinks her time is up at the Studio and she thinks that she should move on. Marco sees Francesca and Ana together and gets the wrong idea. He reveals to Francesca that Ana kissed him, despite the fact that Broadway and Maxi told him not to tell her. Francesca is furious and walks away from Marco.
142	62	"The cofiance its wins"	17 September 2013	1 August 2015
In the park, Diego and Ludmila argue about the plan. Diego ends up standing up for Violetta and telling Ludmila that she knows nothing about his father. Ludmila shoots back at Diego that she does know who his father is, and if he's not willing to carry out the plan, she'll never tell him. However, the two don't realize that Federico is watching. Angie tells Violetta that she can no longer be her tutor. Angie says that she has already picked out some other tutors to replace her, but Violetta refuses, saying that the only tutor she wants is Angie. Violetta is walking in the park when Leon comes up to her. Violetta pleads Leon to forget about their relationship. Unbeknownst to them, Lara is watching behind a tree and hears everything. At the very end of the episode, Lara approaches Violetta. She says that if Violetta tells Leon to stay away, it's proving she cares. Lara demands that Violetta stays away from Leon, or she'll have to answer to her.
143	63	"Bad choice"	18 September 2013	2 August 2015
After telling Violetta to back off, Lara is told by Leon to stop thinking about Violetta. Lara says she can't because Violetta always comes between them, which Leon denies. Lara gets frustrated with Leon and walks away from him. Ludmila tells Federico that she's feeling guilty for no reason. She also says that Federico should be the one that's feeling guilty and not her. Federico gets confused and ends up feeling like he's lost a chance with Ludmila. Diego wonders why Violetta is avoiding him. He tells her that nothing is going on between him and Ludmila. Violetta is honest in saying that her heart doesn't believe in him. Pablo suspects that Gregorio went into Antonio's office to steal the recording. Gregorio is upset by this and proves that he has no clover leaf birthmark. Diego tries to change Ludmila. Here, Ludmila denies her feelings for Federico. Diego tells Ludmila that if happiness is her goal, ruining people isn't the way. Violetta thinks Leon tells her bad things about Diego because he wants her away from him. Leon says that he'll do anything to prove that Diego is a phony. Broadway tries to impress Camila by singing and dancing for her. Ana lies to Francesca and tells her that Marco fooled them both. The episode ends with Violetta walking in on Angie and Herman talking about not telling her something.
144	64	"The pact of Ludmila"	19 September 2013	3 August 2015
When Violetta walks in on Herman and Angie, Herman creates a cover saying that Angie quit her job because of him. Angie walks away from the classroom in disbelief of yet another lie from Herman. Violetta begs her father not to push Angie too hard. Ana tells Francesca that Marco never forgot her, even when he was dating Francesca. Francesca believes Ana and walks into Marco, telling him that she doesn't want to see him ever again. Broduey realizes that when Camila was with Seba, he truly loves her. Camila is disgusted by this and thinks that Broadway would only love her if she was with someone else. Angie is walking down the street when Herman comes running after her, Angie does not want to hear what he has to say and carries on walking. Herman manages to stop Angie and confronts her. He begs her to stay for Violetta's sake. Angie promptly refuses. Wanting to get back on Francesca's good side, Marco goes to Violetta for help. He asks her if she can get Francesca to the karaoke bar, she agrees. When they get there, Francesca sees Marco and Ana together, and she gets jealous. She tries to leave, but Violetta and Camila stop her. Marco sings a song for Francesca, and Ana goes up to her. Ana tells Francesca that Marco sings the same song to all the girls. Francesca is mortified.
145	65	"Something lights"	20 September 2013	4 August 2015
Diego tries to tell Violetta the truth, but she interrupts him. Francesca is angry at Marco again because Ana told her that he sang a song to her the first time they met too. Ludmila is jealous at Naty because she sang karaoke with Federico. Camila and Broadway decide to have a battle between the girls' band and the boys' band, so the girls sing "Once Again" and the boys sing "Lights, Camera, Action". Back home, Herman is surprised at Angie's decision about moving to France. When Violetta gets back from the karaoke bar, Angie tries to tell Violetta about it, but she can't do it and ends up telling her that she'll be her tutor again. The next day at the Studio, the dance groups are rehearsing. This ends in chaos, because Marco and Ana rehearse together with Diego and Francesca, and Naty and Federico rehearse with Ludmila and Maxi. Meanwhile, Angie tells Antonio that she doesn't want to go to France because she can't leave Violetta on her own again. But she doesn't realize that Violetta was eavesdropping and heard everything. When Angie found out about it, she and Violetta talked, and Violetta convinced Angie about that she should move to France.
146	66	"Angie go to France"	23 September 2013	5 August 2015
Violetta convinces Angie to go to France. Angie accepts and says she'll go. Violetta wants to arrange a farewell tea for Angie. Angie says she'll have it, only if it's small. At the farewell tea, Angie tells Herman that she sometimes wishes Violetta had a better father. Herman gets slightly sarcastic about it. For one last time, Angie, Violetta, and Herman sing a song together.
147	67	"Our way"	24 September 2013	6 August 2015
Francesca knows that Ana tricked her. Ana only wanted to keep Francesca away from Marco. Lara tries to convince Leon to sing at motocross in order not to lose their sponsor. Violetta and Leon dream about the same song, "Our Way". This makes them both realize that they still have feelings for each other, but they still try to hide it. Violetta's life gets even more complicated when she makes a shocking discovery: Jeremiah, the pianist, is Herman in disguise.
148	68	"The real father"	25 September 2013	7 August 2015
Violetta is upset after she discovers that Herman is Jeremiah. Shes leaves the house upset. Leon, Broadway, Andres and Diego compose a new song and perform it for Pablo. But halfway through the song, Diego realizes that Leon is singing to Violetta and becomes enraged, causing him to stop singing and shout at Leon.
149	69	"We reach the stars"	26 September 2013	8 August 2015
Ludmila threatens Diego. Francesca won't keep dating Marco. Seba and Camila break up. Leon faces a dilemma. Violetta can't forgive German. Ramallo seems to like Ingrid. Naty and Broduey think Maxi is hitting on Camila. Leon and Violetta pine for each other.
150	70	"Once again love?"	27 September 2013	9 August 2015
Leon and Violetta decides to stay friends, and keep all the memories, they shared together. They go for a walk together, and they share a hug. At the same moment, Diego and Lara appears. Ludmila tries to stop Diego telling the truth about her to Federico. Because of that, Diego breaks the gift that Ludmila got from Federico, making him mad at her. The big dance contest is coming up, and the dancers get ready. Naty and Federico are the first ones to perform, which makes Naty nervous. Maxi eventually calms her down, by kissing her. Leon and Violetta win the dance contest, with Diego and Francesca as the runner-up.
151	71	"To understand"	30 September 2013	10 August 2015
Violetta, Leon, Francesca, and Diego celebrate their victory, but German shows up to the Studio and makes a scene saying his daughter will not go to Madrid. Maxi confesses his love for Naty. Jade and Matias try to regain their freedom.
152	72	"Direction : Madrid, Part 1"	1 October 2013	11 August 2015
German finally agrees to let his daughter go to Madrid. Violetta, Leon, Francesca, and Diego are in Madrid, but after the boys start fighting, the girls try to stay away and get lost in the city. Diego and Leon split up to see who can find the girls first.
153	73	"Direction : Madrid Part 2"	2 October 2013	12 August 2015
Diego is happy he found Violetta, seconds after Leon sees her first, and spends the day with his girlfriend. They find a clue that could help figure out who his father is. In the meantime, Leon is sad and angry, and goes back to the hotel with Francesca. She tries to cheer him up by singing and gets praised by the YouMix Europe people. The next day at rehearsal, Leon tells Violetta he and Lara broke up.
154	74	"Spying"	3 October 2013	13 August 2015
Violetta hopes Leon will confess why he broke up with Lara. Francesca pretends she didn't overhear Diego talking with Ludmila.
155	75	"The biggest pain"	4 October 2013	14 August 2015
It's the day of the big show in Madrid. Francesca finds out that Marco has sent her so many flowers that they're filling up the entire hotel room. Back home in Buenos Aires, Ludmila is composing a new song about love. Ludmila is trying to tell Gregorio that he has a son, but Gregorio has no idea about who it is. Just before the show in Madrid, Leon finds out about Diego and Ludmila's plan and records everything. Knowing that Violetta will be heartbroken, Leon tries to avoid showing the video to her. She ends up watching the video on Leon's phone, leaving her heartbroken before the big show. When Violetta is about to perform, she stands on the scene, unable to perform. Leon asks to change the number, and Leon and Violetta sing We Can together.
156	76	"The true end lies?"	7 October 2013	15 August 2015
Violetta refuses to talk to Diego after what he did to her and goes to Leon for comfort. After the show, Francesca is offered to sign in an Italian company but does not want to tell Marco. Therefore, she covers it up by saying that the two of them should stay apart.
157	77	"No inspiration"	8 October 2013	16 August 2015
Violetta tries to stay away from León and Lara, as she believes that they have got back together again; Lara says goodbye to León and advises him not to practise motocross for some time and focus on his studies and in his career as a singer.
158	78	"Leonatta"	9 October 2013	17 August 2015
Violetta and Leon get back together, but will they be torn apart again? Violetta discovers that her father wants to hire a BodyGuard for her. Violetta is heartbroken and feels like she has lost her father. Final Appearance of: Lara
159	79	"This can not end ?"	10 October 2013	18 August 2015
Leon clarifies that he was only saying goodbye to Lara and isn't with her anymore. Leon and Violetta clear up the misunderstandings and get back together, after promising each other that they won't let anything come between them again. They lean in to kiss, only to get interrupted by a phone call from Andres, reminding Leon that they have band rehearsal. After Camila and Broadway’ kiss, Broadway apologises and backs away. He begins to walk away but Camila runs after him and tells him she loves him too. They hug and get back together. Federico refuses to help Ludmila with her schemes against Violetta, causing Ludmila to leave angrily, saying she hates him. Jade and Matias succeed in stealing all of Herman's money. However, Ramallo overhears them from the kitchen and calls Inspector Parodi to turn them in. Jade and Matias get arrested and as they climb into the police car, Jade blames Herman everything and says that none of this would have happened if he had just loved her like she deserved. Andres finds a love letter in his locker from Francesca, leading him to think that Francesca is in love with him. Andres changes his look in order to impress her. The students are rehearsing for the final show, but for some reason, Violetta can't sing. That night, Leon visits Violetta as a surprise and she sings 'This Is My Best Moment' for him. Leon loves the song but he still doesn't know why Violetta is feeling so sad. Downstairs, Herman asks Leon to look after her because Leon is much closer to Violetta right now than he is. Leon agrees while Violetta listens from the top of the stairs with a smile on her face. Ramallo then talks to Leon and reveals to him that part of the song Violetta was working on was actually written by Herman from one of Maria's poems that she wrote while pregnant with Violetta. When Herman couldn't finish the song, Ramallo gave it to Violetta, who completed it. Ramallo asks Leon to tell Violetta this piece of information. The next day, Camila and Francesca find out that Leon and Violetta are back together and are very happy for him. Camila, Francesca, and Maxi try to find ways to cheer up Violetta and Leon starts to get an idea. Violetta has trouble with the choreography in dance class and overhears Diego arguing with Gregorio. Gregorio sadly tells Violetta that he doesn't want to waste any more time in being part of Diego's life. The students try to come up with a closing song and everyone starts arguing about their ideas. Frustrated, Violetta gives up tells them that this time, they just can't do it. Francesca confronts Andres when she finds him with her letter and makes it clear that she has no feelings for him and that the letter was for Marco. After Andres leaves, Francesca and Marco agree to meet at the park after he reads the letter. Diego runs into Ludmila and tells her that he hates seeing someone in pain because of him, with tears in his eyes. Parodi tells that she will wait for him until he is released from jail. They share a kiss while Jade looks on in shock. Diego is in the zoom alone, singing a sadder and slower version of 'Be Mine' on the stage. Slowly, the students and teachers of the Studio enter the room and watch Diego sing. Gregorio then goes on stage and gives an emotional and tearful speech, revealing to everyone that Diego is his son. Everyone listens with tears in their eyes, including Ludmila who seems to be feeling remorseful at everything she's done. Gregorio and Diego then share a hug and Violetta leaves the room. Diego goes after her and thanks her for reuniting him with his father. He tells her he still loves her and asks her to forgive him but Violetta says she can't because she doesn't understand how someone could hurt another person like he did to her. Ramallo tells Olga that he loves her and she is the only woman in his life. Leon and Andres try to motivate the others to not quit on writing the song and the students agree to give it one last try. Beto accidentally locks Marco in the fish tank with his cell phone outside, causing him to be late for his meeting with Francesca. Federico tries to cheer up Violetta by singing 'Lights, Camera, Action', but it only makes her annoyed. Ludmila comes in and tells Violetta that ever since she's met her, she's never seen her so sad and distant from music. Violetta reveals that the reason she can't sing or dance is because she feels like she is very far away from her father and there's an emptiness inside her. She then says that she won't be a part of the show.
160	80	"It's my best moment"	11 October 2013	19 August 2015
Ludmila and Federico convince Violetta to take part in the show, telling her that she's performed in much worse situations. Violetta agrees to be part of the show, however, she still feels like something is missing. Francesca thinks Marco has stood her up for their meeting at the park. When Francesca finally gets a hold of Marco, she doesn't let him explain his absence and tells him it's over. The students still have not come up with a song to close the show and Pablo tells them to take responsibility for their actions and that the song needs to be in the show. This prompts Leon and Andres to lead a brainstorming session with Maxi, Naty, Camila, Broduey and Diego for ideas for the lyrics. The gang finally come up with the lyrics for the song (This Can't End). Ludmila confides in Federico and tells him that by changing her feelings of anger towards Violetta and everyone, it's as if a load has been lifted off her back and she feels relieved. Federico is happy with her change in attitude and they share a hug. Inspector Parodi tells Herman that they still don't know about Jade's whereabouts, but she could be hiding anywhere and to keep a lookout. Violetta sadly tells her father that she feels like their special bond is missing and that their relationship is not the same anymore. She wishes that something magical would happen to get them close again. She also asks Herman not to come see her at the show tomorrow. The morning of the show, Leon comes to Violetta's house to talk to Herman about performing the song they wrote together (This Is My Best Moment) so they could fix their relationship. Backstage, everybody is getting ready to perform. Gregorio gives some words of encouragement to Diego and Diego tells him that he'd always dreamed of this moment - his father keeping him company before he got on stage. Ludmila and Camila are the first to perform and then the boys' band sing 'Come With Us'. Everybody is worried about Violetta and wondering why she is so sad. Leon has something planned that will make Violetta feel better and he asks for Antonio and Pablo's help. Just before she is about to go on stage, Violetta tells Leon that she never thought her and her father would be so distant. He tells her that maybe that aren't that distant and she hears the opening chords to 'This Is My Best Moment'. They both turn to see Herman playing the piano on stage. Leon then reveals what Ramallo told him earlier - that Herman had starting writing the song using one of her mother's poems, and then Ramallo gave it to Violetta to finish writing it. Violetta is overcome with emotion and goes on stage to sing the song. After performing, she hugs her father and he says that the three of them - Herman, Violetta and Maria - are in this song. Leon says 'I love you' to Violetta and she tells him she loves him too and that this is destiny. Jade follows Herman to the show and finally gets caught and arrested. Francesca forgives Marco and they get back together while every one congratulates them. Everyone is happy and elated as they get back out on stage for their final performance of 'This Can't End'. After the song, Leon kisses Violetta on stage in front of everyone while their friends cheer. The episode ends as Violetta looks into the camera and winks.

== Season 3 (2014–15) ==
According to an interview with Diego Ramos, the series has been renewed for a third season which began filming in April 2014.

No. overall	No. in season	Title	Original air date Latin America	Original air date UK & Ireland
Un nuevo sueño (in English "A new dream")
161	1	"On Tour"	28 July 2014	4 July 2016
Violetta and friends tour with YouMix. Violetta and Leon are together, but his suspicious behaviour causes friction between them. Meanwhile love blossoms for German. First Appearance Of: Clement, Priscilla, Nicolas, and Milton.
162	2	"Problem at high altitude"	29 July 2014	5 July 2016
Violetta and Leon argue about the girls' decision to do a radio interview without consulting the boys, unaware they are live on air! Meanwhile love blossoms for German.
163	3	"One problem, one resolution"	30 July 2014	6 July 2016
After their European tour, the students are faced with a new challenge - they have to organize a show by themselves. Meanwhile Olga plays a prank on Ramallo to get him to propose to her. At the airport Ludmila tumbles down the escalator. Did Violetta push her? Elsewhere it turns out that the mysterious woman in German's life is Ludmila's mother.
164	4	"The return"	31 July 2014	7 July 2016
Olga is about to play a dirty trick on Ramallo in order to finally get a marriage proposal. But Violetta stops her. For Gregorio, the time has come to leave the studio to pursue his own dreams. As Ludmila's anger mounts over the growing bond between German and her own mother, she asks Violetta for help to drive a wedge between the two.
165	5	"New relations"	1 August 2014	8 July 2016
German has invited Priscila and Ludmila to dinner. It ends in disaster when Ludmila, offended by her mother's insults, storms out. Later, Ludmila warns Violetta about Priscila, saying that she is a terrible person. Meanwhile, Diego tries to convince Francesca to talk to Marco about their break-up. Gregorio and Diego leave the studio.
166	6	"Leon at hospital"	4 August 2014	11 July 2016
Leon is unconscious and taken to the hospital after a motorcycle accident. When Violetta sees him lying in a coma, she is extremely worried. But then she manages to awaken with a kiss. Priscila, on the other hand, threatens Jade. If she doesn't leave her and German alone, she will regret it. Olga urges Ramallo to propose to her.
167	7	"Ludmila's plan"	5 August 2014	12 July 2016
Leon is awakened from his coma by Violetta's kiss. German and Priscila share their first kiss right before Jade's eyes. Shortly afterwards, Ludmila uses a voice modification program, fakes her mother's voice and breaks up with German. Meanwhile, Ramallo, bakes a tiramisu for Olga, who considers the dessert a marriage proposal. First Appearance of: Gery
168	8	"The software"	6 August 2014	13 July 2016
German hears Violetta telling Camila that she doesn't feel good about his new relationship. Ludmila has contradictory feelings because she has driven German and Priscila apart. German wants to talk to Priscila, but during the conversation they both realize that neither of them has called the other to end the relationship.
169	9	"Decisions"	7 August 2014	14 July 2016
German thinks that Violetta is responsible for the voice-modifying software and grounds her. But Maxi finds out that Ludmila is the one behind it and tells German. After his motorcycle accident Leon suffers from dizzy spells. Olga is deeply shocked by Ramallo's sudden disappearance. German confronts him, but Ramallo insists on leaving the city.
170	10	"Inauguration"	8 August 2014	15 July 2016
Marco's claim that Diego advised him to break up with Francesca creates new trouble between all parties involved. In order to avoid having to go to Africa, Ludmila apologizes for her behavior, but still threatens to break up Priscila and German. When she sees Leon with Gery, Violetta uses Clement to make him jealous. Olga is left desperate.
171	11	"Friends or more ?"	11 August 2014	18 July 2016
After collapsing on the stage of "Art Rebel" Leon is rushed to the hospital. Naty believes that something romantic is going on between Maxi and Francesca and is urged by Ludmila to make a move. Marco makes it to the preliminary round at the Royal Auditorium in London. Francesca realizes that she has feelings for Diego. Ramallo comes back.
172	12	"Leave the studio"	12 August 2014	19 July 2016
Violetta and Ludmila don't respond well to German's and Priscila's idea to marry. The plan for the four of them to travel is not met with much enthusiasm from the girls either. Naty's plan to make Maxi jealous fails. Ludmila manages to bring Violetta down in the studio. Antonio learns that some of the students want to switch to "Art Rebel".
173	13	"Anything can appen"	13 August 2014	20 July 2016
When Marco and Francesca decide to remain friends, Francesca admits her feelings for Diego. But then she sees him at the park with another girl. Meanwhile, Milton pulls Diego and Gery from the YouMix presentation. Allegedly, Pablo has ordered to do so. In revenge, Gregorio now denies all members of the studio access to "Art Rebel".
174	14	"Direction Barcelona"	14 August 2014	21 July 2016
After Jade has broken into German's house again, Parodi urges Matias to kick her out of the house. Francesca is jealous of the girl at Diego's side, but what she doesn't know is that she is the goddaughter of Diego's mother. Maxi and Naty make up. Violetta is mad at Leon because she saw him with Gery. Ludmila and Violetta have to share a room.
175	15	"Angie's return"	15 August 2014	22 July 2016
Angie flies from Paris to Spain to surprise Violetta and German. Diego's cousin, Erica, wants to convince Diego to reveal his feelings to Francesca. Meanwhile, Gery wants to take advantage of Violetta's absence and tries to get closer to Leon. And Beto has fallen in love with Olga. When he sings, she has butterflies in her stomach.
176	16	"The new tour"	18 August 2014	25 July 2016
The family tries to catch up with Ludmila on the way to the airport, but she returns to the hotel herself, completely devastated. At the same time, Violetta learns about a new YouMix tour, but German insists that the four stay in Europe. After "Alex" has sent Violetta a video, Leon finds out about it and confronts him. And Francesca ignores Diego.
177	17	"Violetta and Alex"	19 August 2014	26 July 2016
Angie has to say goodbye to German and Violetta who are going back to Buenos Aires. Finally Diego reveals his feelings to Francesca. But out of fear of hurting Marco or Violetta, she rejects him. Meanwhile, Nicolas tries to keep Clement away from the studio. Leon's decision continues to cause a lot of trouble. Antonio wants Marco to come on tour.
178	18	"Thief hunt part 1"	20 August 2014	27 July 2016
Francesca still wonders what the others will think when they hear about the romantic feelings between Diego and her. Just now Violetta is telling her about her affection for Diego. But Francesca doesn't understand that this is only platonic and rejects Diego. As the thefts get out of hand, the kids make a plan to catch the culprit.
179	19	"Thief hunt part 2"	21 August 2014	28 July 2016
All the stolen goods fall out of Andre's locker, making him the prime suspect. However, he tells Erica that he knows Clement is the culprit. Finally, Diego announces that Erica is the thief, because she suffers from kleptomania. His heart almost bursts when Francesca finally reciprocates his love. Leon, on the other hand, is jealous of Clement.
180	20	"Revelations"	22 August 2014	29 July 2016
Francesca and Diego confess their love to each other and try to figure out how they can explain it to Violetta and Marco. For Ramallo, however, a world collapses when Olga refuses his marriage proposal and asks him to forget her. Meanwhile, Clement fakes an injury to avoid going on tour while waiting for Violetta's verdict on his songs. Final Appearances: Marco and Antonio
181	21	"Goodbye Antonio"	22 September 2014	1 August 2016
The news of Antonio's death leaves everyone in deep mourning. Especially the first days in the studio are hard to cope with. Pablo has difficulties to return to his daily routine as director of the studio and to continue to run it successfully. Milton is the only one to take advantage of the tragedy by taking the chance to take over the school.
182	22	"Leon leave"	23 September 2014	2 August 2016
Violetta tries, but can't get Leon out of her mind. Pablo interrupts the boys' rehearsal to break the news that YouMix is ending its sponsorship of the studio.
183	23	"Youmix it's over"	24 September 2014	3 August 2016
Violetta decides to terminate her contract with YouMix, Pablo resigns from the studio, and Angie returns to comfort Violetta. Gregorio announces plans to stage a show to attract new sponsors.
184	24	"Big changes"	25 September 2014	4 August 2016
Violetta is pleased to have Angie back. Ludmila steals a song from Violetta, hoping to become the next YouMix star. Violetta and Francesca walk in on Gery singing for Leon.
185	25	"Roxy"	26 September 2014	5 August 2016
Milton drives some of the students away from the studio with his aggressive methods. Fede joins the boys' band. Ludmila arranges her audition with YouMix. Violetta returns to the garage in disguise and sings for Leon.
186	26	"Lies"	29 September 2014	8 August 2016
Violetta accepts Leon's offer for Roxy and Fausta to use the garage as a rehearsal space. German gets fed up of Olga and Ramallo arguing about the new tutor for his daughter and resolves to find one himself.
187	27	"Chemical Reaction"	30 September 2014	9 August 2016
Naty finds out about Ludmila's audition for YouMix. Angie is appointed as Violetta's tutor once more. Diego walks in on Roxy and Fausta at the garage and recognizes them.
188	28	"You are you?"	1 October 2014	10 August 2016
Leon asks Roxy out in front of Gery, who is consumed with jealousy. Ludmila has her audition for YouMix. Leon takes Roxy for a walk, but her wig gets caught on a branch!
189	29	"Rock Bones"	2 October 2014	11 August 2016
Violetta continues to keep her secret, Nicolas proposes to Jade, and Angie sees German in his wedding suit and confesses that she would take Priscila's place.
190	30	"German and Priscila's wedding"	3 October 2014	12 August 2016
Fede breaks off his relationship with Ludmila after discovering she stole her audition song from Violetta. Leon confides in Roxy, and Jade tries to sabotage the engagement party.
191	31	"Sisters"	6 October 2014	15 August 2016
Violetta and Ludmila find living together challenging. Leon and Violetta dance a waltz together and he confesses to feeling confused about her and Roxy. Ludmila is chosen as the new YouMix star.
192	32	"The best singer"	7 October 2014	16 August 2016
Fausta and Diego carry on with their sham romance to keep Andres at bay. Ludmila agrees to leave the studio to pursue her career at YouMix. Violetta uses her alter ego to test Leon.
193	33	"The choice of Leon"	8 October 2014	17 August 2016
Roxy withdraws from Leon, and he blames Violetta for coming between them. He confronts Violetta and tells her to stay away from him and Roxy. Ramallo and Beto fight a duel for Olga.
194	34	"I want more"	9 October 2014	18 August 2016
Camila and Violetta prevent Leon from finding out who Roxy really is. Violetta discovers that Ludmila hasn't really resigned from YouMix and tries to warn Fede. Ludmila discovers the truth about Roxy and Fausta.
195	35	"Move your body!"	10 October 2014	19 August 2016
After arguing with Violetta, Ludmila tries to tell Leon who Roxy really is. Violetta and Ludmila resolve to keep each other's secret. Fede asks Ludmila out again, and Leon kisses Roxy.
196	36	"Threat"	13 October 2014	22 August 2016
The studio is in financial trouble, and German warns Gregorio they may have to shut down. Violetta visits Leon as Roxy, determined to tell him the truth.
197	37	"Stop lying"	14 October 2014	23 August 2016
Violetta decides to hold an auction to raise funds for the studio. Ludmila decides to resign from YouMix for fear of losing Fede, and Leon resolves to erase Violetta from his life.
198	38	"Hope"	15 October 2014	24 August 2016
Rockbones head off on tour. Gregorio discovers Milton's ruse. Maxi realized Diego and Fran are a couple. Violetta visits Leon once more to tell the truth.
199	39	"Underneath It All"	16 October 2014	25 August 2016
Violetta's plan to reveal the truth about Roxy to Leon fails. Gregorio fires Milton from the studio. Fede discovers Ludmila's deception and Violetta sees Fran and Diego embrace.
200	40	"Roxy or Violetta?"	17 October 2014	26 August 2016
Gery finds out about Roxy and asks Alex's help to unmask her. Gregorio announces that the studio must close. Leon sees Roxy, kisses her, and realizes the truth.
El sueño continúa (in English "The dream continues")
201	41	"Un error que no tiene perdón, una canción"	17 November 2014	30 August 2016
Leon cannot forgive Violetta's deception and blames his friends from keeping the truth from him. German pays the debt and becomes the new manager of the studio.
202	42	"El amor nose ha perdido, una canción"	18 November 2014	31 August 2016
Gregorio is furious with Angie for agreeing to German's new position at the studio. Gery, posing as Violetta, sabotages the boys' band meeting with a record label.
203	43	"Un plan para separarlos, una canción"	19 November 2014	1 September 2016
Leon accuses Violetta of sabotaging the record label meeting in front of everyone, Jade calls off her wedding, and Alex fools Violetta into believing Gery and Leon are a couple.
204	44	"Un plan esta punto de saberse, una canción"	20 November 2014	2 September 2016
Gery continues to convince everyone she and Leon are a couple. Ludmila walks in on Francesca and Diego, and threatens to tell Violetta about them. Maxi is upset with Naty.
205	45	"Una relación salio a la luz, una canción"	21 November 2014	5 September 2016
Violetta and Leon continue to argue, Violetta believing he and Gery are a couple. The boys' band signs a record deal. Vilu finds out about Francesca and Diego.
206	46	"Una amistad esta en peligro, una canción"	24 November 2014	6 September 2016
Violetta is furious with Diego and Francesca. Felipe, a Spanish YouMix artist arrives and is asked to fake a romance with Ludmila for publicity. Violetta confronts Leon about his relationship with Gery.
207	47	"Una amistad esta en peligro, una canción"	25 November 2014	7 September 2016
Violetta finds out that Leon and Gery were never a couple. Ludmila tries to explain her relationship with Felipe is just for publicity, but he won't listen. Leon confronts Gery about posing as Violetta. Vilu sings for Alex, and he tries to kiss her.
208	48	"Una verdad, una canción"	26 November 2014	8 September 2016
Violetta refuses Alex's kiss, and Francesca makes a deal with the Italian producer to save the studio. Ramallo tries to warn German that Priscila is not what she seems. Leon is really missing Violetta.
209	49	"Una verdad que duele, una canción"	27 November 2014	9 September 2016
Violetta and Francesca make up, but Diego is upset by Francesca's decision to move to Europe. Violetta calls Leon as Roxy, but has second thoughts later when she overhears him talking to Gery about her.
210	50	"Una reconciliación, una canción"	28 November 2014	12 September 2016
Violetta overhears Leon talking about how she has hurt him and runs away, but he later admits he wants her back. Francesca finds out about the Italian producer's deception.
211	51	"Un error, una canción"	1 December 2014	13 September 2016
Leon tells Violetta he wants to move on from their relationship. Violetta vents her frustration in an email to Leon that she doesn't intend to send, but when Priscila finds German reading it, he accidentally sends the email to Leon.
212	52	"Una verdad, una canción"	2 December 2014	14 September 2016
Angie refuses to leave the studio, Gregorio finds out about Jade's money, and German resolves to tell Leon the truth about the email from Violetta. Leon and Violetta perform together, but still can't resolve their differences.
213	53	"Una decisión apresurada, una canción"	3 December 2014	15 September 2016
Leon is angry with German for interfering in his love life, as is Violetta when she finds out what her father has done. Leon decides to find a new love.
214	54	"Una amenaza, una canción"	4 December 2014	16 September 2016
Violetta vows to get over Leon, and Felipe kisses Naty. The Boy Band records a new video, and Priscila almost shows her true colors. Gregorio and Jade announce plans to put on a show in hope of finding a new sponsor.
215	55	"Una verdad salio a la luz, una canción"	5 December 2014	19 September 2016
Ludmila is fired from YouMix for revealing that her relationship with Felipe was a publicity stunt, and Violetta discovers it was German who sent the email to Leon.
216	56	"Un sueño se hace realidad, una canción"	8 December 2014	20 September 2016
Violetta is furious with German for reading her emails. Ludmila tries to cover up her dismissal from YouMix. Priscila throws Angie out of the house, and Leon pays Violetta a visit.
217	57	"Un reencuentro, una canción"	9 December 2014	21 September 2016
Violetta, preoccupied thinking about Leon, misses a rehearsal, and Gregorio replaces her with Jade as the star of the show. Ludmila sings for Fede to show him her true feelings.
218	58	"Una reconciliación, una canción"	10 December 2014	22 September 2016
Angie and German are filmed in embrace. Matias gives the footage to Violetta to hide, but Priscila finds it in her room. Ludmila wants to return to the studio.
219	59	"Una charla, una canción"	11 December 2014	23 September 2016
Angie decides to go back to Europe, and Violetta tells Leon she is determined to get over him, unaware that he wants her back. Gregorio walks in on the Boy's Band secret rehearsal and throws them out of the studio.
220	60	"Un beso, una canción"	12 December 2014	12 December 2016
Jade sees German and Angie kissing and decides to close the studio. Ludmila and Violetta become closer. Leon joins Violetta on stage and kisses her in front of everyone.
221	61	"Un amigo, una canción"	12 January 2015	13 December 2016
German and Angie try to deny their feelings after sharing a kiss. Jade agrees to reopen the studio only if German marries her. Leon and Violetta decide to stay just friends.
222	62	"La verdad sobre Priscila, una canción"	13 January 2015	14 December 2016
German, Angie, and Gregorio meet with Jade in order to convince her to reopen the studio, but with little luck, and the Boy Band quit the record label.
223	63	"Un retorno, una canción"	14 January 2015	15 December 2016
German threatens to tell Nicolas that Jade has bought the studio unless she reopens it. Violetta and Leon find it hard to stay just friends. Priscila vows to destroy German and Angie.
224	64	"Un camino a elegir, una canción"	15 January 2015	16 December 2016
The studio reopens its doors, but Nicolas decides to leave Jade after learning that she bought it behind his back. Priscila finds out about the kiss between German and Angie.
225	65	"Una conclusión, una canción"	16 January 2015	17 December 2016
Pablo agrees to return to the studio, but Nicolas tells German he intends to sell it. Violetta and Leon continue to hide their true feelings as they try to stay just friends.
226	66	"Una trampa, una canción"	19 January 2015	18 December 2016
German decides to buy the studio, and Priscila puts a venomous spider in Angie's car. When Violetta tries to expose her, she pushes her down the stairs and blames Ludmila.
227	67	"Una sospecha, una canción"	20 January 2015	19 December 2016
Almost everyone blames Ludmila for Violetta's accident, but she finds support from Naty and German. German offers Pablo the position of director at the studio.
228	68	"Una verdad salió a la luz, una canción"	21 January 2015	20 December 2016
Violeta refuses to believe that Priscila could push her down the stairs and blame her own daughter. A film director shows an interest in Camila's acting skills, and Violetta and Leon find CCTV footage of the accident.
229	69	"Una visita, una canción"	22 January 2015	21 December 2016
Violetta waits for the right moment to tell German about Priscila being responsible for her accident. Priscila finds out about the CCTV evidence against her, and manages to obtain the only copy.
230	70	"Una explicación, una canción"	23 January 2015	22 December 2016
Violetta and Leon fall victim to Gery and Alex's plan to tear them apart. Priscila turns herself to the police, and Ludmila realizes her mother has been lying to her to keep her estranged from her father for years.
231	71	"Un confesión, una canción"	26 January 2015	23 December 2016
Violetta and Leon almost kiss, but Violetta draws away, confused. German offers to let Ludmila live with him until her father can settle in Buenos Aires so she doesn't have to go to Africa.
232	72	"Una revelación, una canción"	27 January 2015	24 December 2016
Leon is jealous when he hears that Alex loves Violetta. In light of discovering Clement there, Nicolas refuses to sell the studio to German, jeopardizing its future.
233	73	"Un descubrimiento, una canción"	28 January 2015	25 December 2016
Violetta desperately tries to talk to Nicolas into selling the studio to her father, and Priscila urges Ludmila to help her get revenge on German and Angie.
234	74	"Una verdad, una canción"	29 January 2015	26 December 2016
Ludmila refuses to help Priscila plot against German and Angie, and Pablo and Brenda grow closer. Nicolas agrees to sell the studio to German. Clement leaves his guitar in the park and abandons his musical dreams.
235	75	"Una buena noticia, una canción"	30 January 2015	27 December 2016
German announces that he is the new owner of the studio. Priscila and Ludmila fight, and Nicolas sees his son perform. That may lead him to a change of heart.
236	76	"Una comprensión, una canción"	2 February 2015	28 December 2016
Leon discovers there is nothing standing between him and Violetta. Camila gets her movie script but panics when she realizes she will have to kiss the leading man. Jade and Clement grow close, and Priscila has Angie's car brakes sabotaged.
237	77	"Abrázame y verás"	3 February 2015	29 December 2016
Priscila realized the error of her ways after almost causing an accident for Angie, Violetta and Ludmila. German decides to confess his feelings for Angie.
238	78	"Un viaje, una canción"	4 February 2015	30 December 2016
Clement confesses everything he and Gery have been up to in a video and sends it to Violetta. Nicolas tries to reconcile with Jade, and German can't bring himself to confess his love to Angie.
239	79	"Un amor verdadero, una canción"	5 February 2015	31 December 2016
Camila makes a decision about her film career, Jade and Nicolas are reunited, Ludmila and Fede share a kiss, and Violetta and Leon realize they have been apart for too long.
240	80	"Una última canción"	6 February 2015	1 January 2017
The time has come for reunions as everyone is reconciled. German and Angie get married in front of all their friends and families, and Violetta and Leon sing at the wedding.
