= Violetta (TV series) =

Argentine telenovela

- Genre: Telenovela; Musical; Romantic drama; Comedy; Teen comedy
- Written by: Solange Keoleyan; Sebastián Parrotta
- Directed by: Jorge Nisco; Martín Saban; Sebastián Pivotto; Matías Risi (guest)
- Creative director: Víctor Tevah
- Starring: See list
- Opening theme: "En Mi Mundo" performed by Martina Stoessel
- Country of origin: Argentina
- Original languages: Spanish; English; Italian
- No. of seasons: 3
- No. of episodes: 240 (list of episodes)

Production
- Executive producer: Diego Carabelli
- Producers: Adrián Suar; Fernando Blanco
- Production locations: Buenos Aires, Argentina
- Running time: 45 minutes
- Production company: Pol-ka Producciones

Original release
- Network: Disney Channel
- Release: 14 May 2012 – 6 February 2015

Related
- Soy Luna; BIA

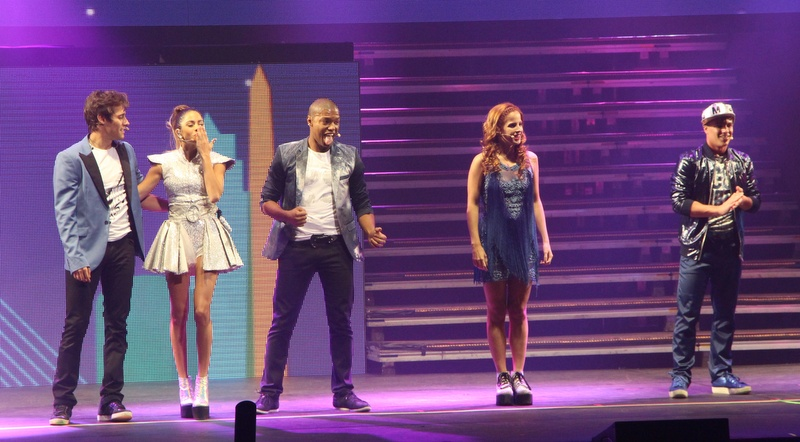

Violetta is an Argentine telenovela filmed in Buenos Aires, Argentina and developed by Disney Channel Latin America and Europe, Middle East and Africa (EMEA) and production company Pol-ka, debuted in Argentina, Latin America and Italy on 14 May 2012.

Violetta tells the story of a musically talented teenager (played by Martina Stoessel) who returns to her native Argentina with her father, Germán (played by Diego Ramos), after living in Europe for several years, navigating the trials and tribulations of growing up.

Each episode includes original musical numbers from diverse musical genres such as pop music and Latin music.

== Plot ==
| Series | Episodes | | Originally released | | UK & Ireland First aired | UK & Ireland Last aired |
| Series | Episodes | | First released | Last released | UK & Ireland First aired | UK & Ireland Last aired |
|---|---|---|---|---|---|---|
| 1 | 80 | 40 | 14 May 2012 | 6 July 2012 | 22 July 2013 | 25 October 2013 |
| 1 | 80 | 40 | 3 September 2012 | 26 October 2012 | 4 November 2013 | 28 August 2014 |
| 2 | 80 | 40 | 29 April 2013 | 21 June 2013 | 1 June 2015 | 10 July 2015 |
| 2 | 80 | 40 | 19 August 2013 | 11 October 2013 | 11 July 2015 | 19 August 2015 |
| 3 | 80 | 20 | 28 July 2014 | 22 August 2014 | 4 July 2016 | 29 July 2016 |
| 3 | 80 | 20 | 22 September 2014 | 17 October 2014 | 1 August 2016 | 26 August 2016 |
| 3 | 80 | 20 | 17 November 2014 | 12 December 2014 | 30 August 2016 | 12 December 2016 |
| 3 | 80 | 20 | 12 January 2015 | 6 February 2015 | 13 December 2016 | 1 January 2017 |

=== Season 1 (2012) ===
16-year-old Violetta Castillo is unaware of her very special talent for singing, inherited from her mom María, who died in a bus crash. Her father Germán keeps her origins and María's fate from Violetta, worried that she might follow her path.

After María died, they moved to Madrid. Germán raised Violetta alone. Aware that Violetta is a very talented musician, he encourages her to take piano lessons but keeps her away from singing. At Buenos Aires, Violetta starts taking piano lessons at 'Studio 21' (later On Beat Studio), a prestigious music school. There she has her new teacher Angie who becomes her governess too but is secretly her aunt, Maria's sister. Angie fears that if she tells Violetta or Germán the truth, Germán would take Violetta away to another country, never seeing Violetta again. Violetta falls in love with Tomás, taken by his best friend, Francesca. Ludmila, the richest and most arrogant girl in Studio 21, also falls in love with Tomás, angering León, her old boyfriend. Later, Ludmila and Tomás start dating. A furious León decides to date Violetta, but starts having feelings for her. Germán is engaged to Jade, a callous and ambitious, yet unintelligent woman. Jade does everything to marry Germán because she loves him truly, but Matías, her older brother, wants her to marry Germán for money, to Violetta's disagreement.

Jade discovers Violetta secretly studying music in Studio 21, forcing her to support Jade's marriage to Germán to keep Violetta's secret with Germán. Germán discovers that Violetta studies in the Studio and that Angie is actually her aunt Violetta. Germán decides to take Violetta away, but through Angie, he acknowledges Violetta’s passion and decides to stay in Buenos Aires, allowing Violetta to continue at Studio 21. Tomás goes back to Spain to make something of his music and Ludmila makes amends. León promises himself to forget Violetta.

=== Season 2 (2013) ===
In the second season, Violetta starts falling in love with León and he feels the same for her. They start to date, but Diego (Diego Domínguez), who is new at Studio 21, steals a kiss from Violetta. Ludmila continues to be an unkind and glamorous girl who does everything to get what she wants: she called in her friend since childhood to help her get rid of Violetta from the studio but she became impatient and blackmailed Diego to continue to pretend that he loves Violetta, telling him that if he will do that, she will tell him who his father is (as his father abandoned him when he was a child). Marco does everything to date Francesca, who doesn't know what she feels for him. Camila and Broduey start the season fighting, but end up friends, Camila meets DJ and he liked her, but he left. Camila and Maxi kissed but didn't feel anything, Seba (Rock Bones) comes and they fell in love, until they get together at the end. Naty, Ludmila's best friend, and Maxi, also split up at first, but come back in full force. Francesca falls in love with Marco (Xabiani Ponce de León) after many doubts and thoughts (Diego's best friend). Ludmila starts falling in love with Federico (Ruggero Pasquarelli) and get together at the end. Diego finds out that his father is Gregorio, a selfish teacher that works at the Studio. Diego is very mad at Gregorio for abandoning him; at the end, they make peace. Angie goes away to France, leaving Germán alone. Esmeralda is hired by Jade and Matías to win Germán over and steal his money. However, on their wedding day, Jade reveals that Esmeralda is a scam. The two are arrested and Matías starts dating the deputy who arrested him, Marcela Parodi. León suspected Diego all along, and found proof that Diego and Ludmila were together to make Violetta sad and humiliated on her big performance when they were going to say that Diego never loved Violetta. León shows the footage of proof on his cellphone to Francesca, but Violetta overhears. Violetta starts crying during her performance without any strength to sing. However, León gets on stage and starts singing "Podemos" with Violetta. Camila and Broduey get back together, as do Francesca and Marco, after a big interference with Marco's ex-girlfriend. Violetta and León get back together, and in the end, after all that has passed, their love is stronger than ever.

=== Season 3 (2014–15) ===
The studio cast of On Beat went on a major world tour, which had been successful in Europe. Violetta and her friends had to return to Buenos Aires for their last year of school. With dreams and individual ambitions multiplied by fame, the group began to crumble, putting Studio On Beat in danger. Gery, who falls in love with León, and Clément (also known as Alex), who falls in love with Violetta, are introduced at the beginning of the season. Violetta and Ludmila are forced to share the same roof when Germán and Priscilla, the mother of Ludmila, start dating and later get married, but Priscilla turns out to be a snake and the worst person anyone has ever met. Violetta and León become separated, but still love each other, but Alex and Gery will do anything to keep them separate, since they are passionate, respectively, for Violetta and León. Marco goes away, and Francesca and Diego fall in love with each other. However, Francesca is afraid of Violetta finding out (since Diego regrets what he did to Violetta during the previous season) and decides to keep their relationship secret. With the death of Antonio (the previous director of Studio 21), Pablo exits Studio On Beat at the end of You Mix sponsorship, the site slowly goes bankrupt and it is up to Gregorio, the new director, Angie (who returns in this season) and Beto, with the help of Germán, to save the studio. Ludmila starts to become a better person and when forced to choose between staying in the Studio On Beat or be a star, she chooses the Studio. In order to spy on León, Violetta and Francesca masquerade as Roxy and Fausta, but León falls in love with Roxy, and Violetta is forced to tell him the truth. The group travel to Seville, Spain where Violetta and Leon realize their true feelings for each other and Gery and Clement end up together. In Seville, they put on their last tremendous show. After performing their last songs ever, Germán proposes to Angie. The series ends with Germán marrying Angie, back in Buenos Aires, with everyone singing "Crecimos Juntos".

== Cast and characters ==
=== Main ===
- Martina Stoessel as Violetta Castillo
- Jorge Blanco as León Vargas
- Mercedes Lambre as Ludmila Ferro
- Nicolás Garnier as Andrés
- Alba Rico as Natalia "Naty"
- Lodovica Comello as Francesca Caviglia
- Candelaria Molfese as Camila Torres
- Facundo Gambandé as Maximiliano "Maxi" Ponte
- Diego Ramos as Germán Castillo
- Pablo Espinosa as Tomás Heredia (season 1)
- Simone Lijoi as Luca Caviglia (season 1)
- Artur Logunov as Braco (season 1)
- Rodrigo Velilla as Napoleón "Napo" (season 1)
- Samuel Nascimento as Broduey
- Clara Alonso as Ángeles "Angie" Carrara
- Florencia Benítez as Jade La Fontaine
- Joaquín Berthold as Matías La Fontaine
- Mirta Wons as Olga Patricia Peña
- Alfredo Allende as Lisandro Ramallo
- Pablo Sultani as Pablo Sultani
- Rodrigo Pedreira as Gregorio Casal
- Ezequiel Rodríguez as Pablo Galindo
- Alberto Fernández de Rosa as Antonio Jerez Fernández Méndez (seasons 1–2; recurring season 3) (Note: Alberto Fernández de Rosa is still credited as a guest star throughout the rest of the third season after making his final appearance in the twentieth episode.)
- Diego Domínguez as Diego Hernández (seasons 2–3)
- Xabiani Ponce de León as Marco Tavelli (seasons 2–3) (Note: Xabiani Ponce de León is still credited as a regular throughout the rest of the third season after making his final appearance in the twentieth episode.)
- Valeria Baroni as Lara (season 2)
- Carla Pandolfi as Esmeralda Ferrara Di Pietro (season 2) (Note: Carla Pandolfi is still credited as a regular throughout the rest of the second season after making her final appearance in the sixtieth episode.)
- Valentina Frione as Jacqueline "Jackie" Sáenz (season 2) (Note: Valentina Frione is still credited as a regular throughout the rest of the second season after making her final appearance in the fifty fifth episode.)
- Ruggero Pasquarelli as Federico (season 3; recurring seasons 1–2)
- Macarena Miguel as Gery (season 3)
- Damien Lauretta as Clement Cortés / Alexandre "Alex" Benoit (season 3)
- Florencia Ortíz as Priscila Ferro (season 3)
- Rodrigo Frampton as Milton Vinicius (season 3) (Note: Rodrigo Frampton is still credited as a regular throughout the rest of the third season after making his final appearance in the fortieth episode.)
- Diego Alcalá as Marotti (season 3; recurring seasons 1–2)
- Nacho Gadano as Nicolás Cortés (season 3)

=== Recurring ===
| Character | Actors / Voice actors | | |
| Character | Season 1 (2012) | Season 2 (2013) | Season 3 (2014–15) |
|---|---|---|---|
| Agustina Heredia | Iara Muñoz (English dub: Cindy O'Connor) | | |
| Andréa | Nikole Castillo (Note: Portrayed by Stephie Camarena in episode 3, and Nikole Castillo in all other episodes.) (English dub: Cindy Robinson) | | |
| Rafael "Rafa" Palmer | Germán Tripel (English dub: Mike Davis) | | |
| Laura | Nicole Luis (English dub: Cherami Leigh) | | |
| Angélica Carrara | Nilda Raggi | | |
| Helena "Lena" | Lucía Gil | Lucía Gil | Lucía Gil |
| Jacinto La Fontaine | Javier Niklison (English dub: Patrick Seitz) | | |
| Dionisio "DJ" Juárez | | Gerardo Velázquez (English dub: Ben Pronsky) | |
| Emma Toledo | | Paloma Sirvén (English dub: Reba Buhr) | |
| Oscar Cardozo | | Luis Sabatini | |
| Ámbar | | Agustina Cabo | |
| Marcela Parodi | | Soledad Comasco | Soledad Comasco |
| Juan | | | Leo Bosio |
| Felipe Díaz | | | Javier Quesada |
| Matylda | | | Justyna Bojczuk |
| Brenda | | | Julía Martínez Rubio |

== Production ==
Following the global phenomenon of Patito Feo, an Argentine telenovela produced by Ideas del Sur that aired on Disney Channel between July 2007 and March 2011 in Latin America, Europe and Asia, receiving consistently high viewership and becoming an international success of merchandise, soundtrack albums, and concert tours; Disney decided to begin production on its own first original telenovela. The show, inspired by Patito Feo, was produced in Argentina in collaboration with local production company Pol-Ka. The cast was formed by actors from across Hispanic America, Brazil, Spain and Italy.

Filming began in September 2011 in Buenos Aires, Argentina, and lasted for seven months. The series was co-produced by Disney Channel Latin America, Europe, Middle East and Africa. The series was filmed entirely in high definition at the Central Park Studios in Buenos Aires. On 31 December 2011, Disney Channel Latin America broadcast a New Year's television special entitled Celebratón, where Martina Stoessel performed the song Tu Resplandor (Disney Princesses). Disney Channel announced that the series would premiere in 2012. The cast was first introduced on 22 December 2011. In March 2012, promos and ads started airing to promote the series.

In early April 2012, a music video for "En Mi Mundo", sung by Martina Stoessel, was uploaded to Disney Channel Latin America's website. Violetta finally premiered in Latin America and Italy on 14 May 2012. The cast visited Mexico City and Bogotá and sung live on a Radio Disney event at Luna Park in Buenos Aires. On 25 October, the last episode of the first season was aired. Between September and October 2012, the show had its premiere in Brazil, France, Israel and Spain.

On 1 November 2012, shootings for the second season began. The second season started in Latin America in April, in Italy in June and in Spain in September. The complete cast visited Paris, Milan and Madrid for promotion at the end of June. The final scenes from the second season were shot in Spain.

Among the products spawned from the shows was an official magazine (available in Latin America, Italy and Spain), sticker album (available in France, Latin America, Italy and Spain), a series of books (available in Latin America, France, Spain and Italy) and trading cards (available in Italy and Argentina). DVDs were also released in Italy and Spain. There's also a soundtrack album featuring the music from the show. The album has achieved 3× Platinum in Argentina, Platinum in Spain and Gold Certification in Chile and Brazil.

In June 2013, after three months of rehearsal, the musical with the complete cast made its debut at Teatro Gran Rex. Following the Patito Feo model, the cast played concerts daily during the Winter Vacation. Prior to the debut, all 60 presentations were already sold out with over 200.000 tickets sold. After the season in Buenos Aires, the cast also toured across Argentina, Latin America and Europe. Besides the 60 concerts in Buenos Aires, the cast also toured the rest of Argentina.

In October 2013, Diego Ramos announced a third season. Production began in March 2014 for a 28 July 2014 premiere. This was the final season.

=== Casting ===
Martina Stoessel was chosen by casting. The actor Diego Ramos was instead cast as the Violetta's father by proposal and following an audition, sent to Europe, has been confirmed. While actress Lodovica Comello, who played Francesca, was attending school in Milan, her school's principal informed the students that there would be an audition; she decided to participate. Instead, the actor Ruggero Pasquarelli was chosen by proposal. For the second season, casting calls were also held at the request of fans of the series in Milan, Naples and Rome.

It was confirmed that most of the cast of the first season, except for actors Rodrigo Velilla, Artur Logunov and lead actor Pablo Espinosa will return for the second season. It was also announced the inclusion of new characters played by Diego Domínguez who will play the new rival of León, Diego, and then actors like Valeria Baroni, Xabiani Ponce De León, Paloma Sirvén, Gerardo Velázquez, Carla Pandolfi and Valentina Frione. Bridgit Mendler made a cameo appearance in the second season.

For the third season, there were new characters played by Damien Lauretta, Macarena Miguel, Rodrigo Frampton, Florencia Ortiz and Nacho Gadano. The American pop rock band R5 made an appearance during an episode in the third season, performing their 2014 single "Heart Made Up on You".

== Broadcast ==
The first season originally aired from 14 May to 26 October 2012, in Latin America. In the UK and Ireland, the season ran from 22 July 2013 to 28 August 2014. It premiered on 26 August 2013, and ended on 4 April 2014, in Europe, the Middle East and Africa. In Scandinavia, it premiered 14 October 2013 and ended 6 June the following year. In Australia and New Zealand, the first season premiered on 18 October 2013. It is not known if it finished its run on television, but the complete first season was available at the launch of Netflix in those territories. In the United States, it premiered on 1 September 2014 on Azteca, and ended on 19 December. The show had its English-language debut with the first two seasons being made available on Netflix U.S. starting 10 July 2015. In Southeast Asia, only the first half of the first season was aired exclusively to Singapore and the Philippines. It premiered 3 March 2014 for the Singaporean feed and 5 May 2014 for the Philippine feed. In Taiwan, the first half of the first season premiered on 19 January 2015 with the Taiwanese Mandarin dubbing (songs were left in English). The second half of the first season aired on 6 February 2017, it was aired in English with Taiwanese Mandarin subtitles.

The second season originally aired from 29 April to 11 October 2013, in Latin America. It premiered on 25 August 2014, in Europe, the Middle East and Africa and ended 10 April 2015. Prior to the season finale, Netflix Latin America started putting up the English audio on episodes that had not yet aired in English internationally. In Scandivania, it premiered on 13 October 2014 and ended 29 May 2015. The UK and Ireland then aired the season everyday starting 1 June at 10:10pm until 19 August. In Australia, the complete second season was put up weeks after the first on Netflix, but has not aired on Disney Channel.

The third season originally aired from the 28 July 2014 to 6 February 2015, in Latin America. In Europe, the Middle East and Africa, it premiered 21 September 2015. By October 2015, all episodes were available in English on Netflix Latin America. In Scandinavia, the season premiered on 12 October 2015. The season was added to Netflix U.S. on 31 December 2015. The UK and Ireland aired season 3 starting on 4 July 2016, at 10pm and the final episode of season 3 was shown on 1 January 2017.

When Disney+ launched in November 2019, the first season of Violetta appeared on the service for the first time in the U.S. since Netflix removed the show sometime in 2017–2018. The second season appeared on 29 May 2020, and the third arrived on 18 September 2020.

== Reception ==
=== Viewership ===
In Chile, the average viewers were about 352,000. In Spain, the first episode received a 3.1% share or 461,000 viewers and it had increased by 93% by the end of the first season. The series was also successful in Mexico, Colombia, and Brazil for kids aged 4–11. It was also popular online, with 5 million YouTube visits, 50 million official website visits, and over 80 million Facebook visits. The first episode in Italy received 195,973 viewers, making it Disney Channel's most watched broadcast in the country. The average for each episode was around 200,000 viewers. The Rai Gulp premiere had a 1% share or 272,000 viewers and the second episode received 300,000 viewers or a share of 1.34%. In the UK, the show got 104,000 views in the first day, then it increased to 115,000 a week later making it the 3rd watched show of that week. The show wasn't very popular with the public. It was criticized for the dubbed singing in the first season of the series, but the show's rating was at 9.5. In 2014 however, it changed, as it had decreased to 6.8 in 2015.

=== Awards and nominations ===
| 2012 | Kids' Choice Awards Argentina | Favorite TV Show | Violetta | Nominated |
| 2012 | Kids' Choice Awards Argentina | Favorite Actor | Pablo Espinosa | Won |
| 2012 | Kids' Choice Awards Argentina | Favorite Villain | Mercedes Lambre | Won |
| 2012 | Kids' Choice Awards Argentina | Female Newcomer | Martina Stoessel | Won |
| 2013 | Nickelodeon Kids' Choice Awards | Favorite Latin Artist | Martina Stoessel | Nominated |
| 2013 | Premios Gardel | Best Soundtrack Album of Film / Television | Violetta | Won |
| 2013 | Martín Fierro Awards | Outstanding Children / Youth's Program | Violetta | Won |
| 2013 | Martín Fierro Awards | Female Newcomer | Martina Stoessel | Won |
| 2013 | Kids' Choice Awards Mexico | Favorite Actor | Jorge Blanco | Won |
| 2013 | Kids' Choice Awards Mexico | Favorite TV Show | Violetta | Nominated |
| 2013 | Kids' Choice Awards Mexico | Favorite Villain | Mercedes Lambre | Nominated |
| 2013 | Kids' Choice Awards Mexico | Best Supporting Actor | Pablo Espinosa | Nominated |
| 2013 | Kids' Choice Awards Mexico | Best Supporting Actress | Clara Alonso | Nominated |
| 2013 | Kids' Choice Awards Argentina | Favorite TV Show | Violetta | Won |
| 2013 | Kids' Choice Awards Argentina | Favorite TV Actor | Jorge Blanco | Nominated |
| 2013 | Kids' Choice Awards Argentina | Favorite TV Actress | Martina Stoessel | Nominated |
| 2013 | Kids' Choice Awards Argentina | Favorite TV Actress | Lodovica Comello | Nominated |
| 2013 | Kids' Choice Awards Argentina | Best Supporting Actor / Actress | Samuel Nascimento | Won |
| 2013 | Kids' Choice Awards Argentina | Favorite Villain | Mercedes Lambre | Won |
| 2013 | Kids' Choice Awards Argentina | Male Newcomer | Xabiani Ponce De León | Nominated |
| 2014 | Kids' Choice Awards Mexico | Favorite TV Show (national) | Violetta | Nominated |
| 2014 | Kids' Choice Awards Mexico | Favorite Actor | Jorge Blanco | Won |
| 2014 | Kids' Choice Awards Mexico | Favorite Actress | Martina Stoessel | Nominated |
| 2014 | Kids' Choice Awards Mexico | Favorite Stage Play | Violetta en Vivo | Nominated |
| 2014 | Kids' Choice Awards Mexico | Best Selfie | Martina Stoessel | Nominated |
| 2014 | Kids' Choice Awards Mexico | Favorite Villain | Diego Domínguez | won |
| 2014 | Kids' Choice Awards Colombia | Favorite TV Show | Violetta | Nominated |
| 2014 | Kids' Choice Awards Colombia | Favorite TV Actor | Jorge Blanco | Won |
| 2014 | Kids' Choice Awards Colombia | Favorite TV Actress | Martina Stoessel | Won |
| 2014 | Kids' Choice Awards Colombia | Favorite Villain | Mercedes Lambre | Won |
| 2014 | Meus Prêmios Nick | Favorite TV Character | Violetta | Nominated |

== Films ==
=== Violetta: La Emoción del Concierto ===
A film titled Violetta: La Emoción del Concierto (also known as Violetta en Vivo and Violetta: en Concierto) was shown in cinemas and released on DVD internationally, showing the concert and backstage scenes from Milan. Another version showing the Buenos Aires concert was released in Argentina. It was originally released on 3 April 2014, in Latin America, on 9 May 2014, in Spain, and on 28 June 2014, in Italy. In Argentina, the film was number six at the box office for the second week of April 2014.

=== Tini: The Movie ===
The film Tini: The Movie premiered in Argentina and France on 4 May 2016, and in Spain on 6 May 2016. It features American actress Sofia Carson as the antagonist.

== Related programs ==
=== The U-Mix Show ===
The U-Mix Show was a weekly program that aired a weekly summary of the series and interviews with cast members. It was hosted by Roger González and Daniel Martins. In Brazil, the show was presented by Bruno Heder.

=== El V-log de Francesca ===
El V-log de Francesca is a webseries starring Lodovica Comello set in her bedroom. The sixteen-episode miniseries premiered on 10 June 2012, and lasted until 22 October 2012. The episodes were also dubbed in Italian as "Il videoblog di Francesca", on Disney Channel Italy, in Brazil as "O V-log de Francesca". and in the Netherlands as "De V-Log van Francisca"

=== Ludmila Cyberst@r ===
Ludmila Cyberst@r is another webseries that premiered on 1 June 2012, on the official YouTube channel of Disney Channel Latin America. The series consisted of eight episodes, that aired until 17 September 2012 and then continuously loaded on the same website from Portuguese channel's Disney Channel. Disney Channel UK premiered it on 2 May 2014 on the official Disney Channel UK YouTube channel and ran until 24 May 2014, This is the only Violetta-related program which has been dubbed into English so far.

== Tours ==
=== Violetta en Vivo ===
In early 2013, it was confirmed that there would be a stage adaptation starring Martina Stoessel, Jorge Blanco, Diego Domínguez, and other actors. The series premiered on 13 July 2013, at Teatro Gran Rex in Buenos Aires. 77 performances happened through July, August and September twice a day. Over 120,000 tickets have been sold in Buenos Aires alone, which later increased to 160,000. However, there were no plans to show it in the UK.

List of performances
| Date | Country | City | Venue |
|---|---|---|---|
Latin America
| 13 July 2013 | Argentina | Buenos Aires | Teatro Gran Rex |
| 14 July 2013 | Argentina | Buenos Aires | Teatro Gran Rex |
| 16 July 2013 | Argentina | Buenos Aires | Teatro Gran Rex |
| 17 July 2013 | Argentina | Buenos Aires | Teatro Gran Rex |
| 18 July 2013 | Argentina | Buenos Aires | Teatro Gran Rex |
| 19 July 2013 | Argentina | Buenos Aires | Teatro Gran Rex |
| 20 July 2013 | Argentina | Buenos Aires | Teatro Gran Rex |
| 21 July 2013 | Argentina | Buenos Aires | Teatro Gran Rex |
| 23 July 2013 | Argentina | Buenos Aires | Teatro Gran Rex |
| 24 July 2013 | Argentina | Buenos Aires | Teatro Gran Rex |
| 25 July 2013 | Argentina | Buenos Aires | Teatro Gran Rex |
| 26 July 2013 | Argentina | Buenos Aires | Teatro Gran Rex |
| 27 July 2013 | Argentina | Buenos Aires | Teatro Gran Rex |
| 28 July 2013 | Argentina | Buenos Aires | Teatro Gran Rex |
| 2 August 2013 | Argentina | Buenos Aires | Teatro Gran Rex |
| 3 August 2013 | Argentina | Buenos Aires | Teatro Gran Rex |
| 4 August 2013 | Argentina | Buenos Aires | Teatro Gran Rex |
| 9 August 2013 | Argentina | Buenos Aires | Teatro Gran Rex |
| 10 August 2013 | Argentina | Buenos Aires | Teatro Gran Rex |
| 11 August 2013 | Argentina | Buenos Aires | Teatro Gran Rex |
| 15 August 2013 | Argentina | Buenos Aires | Teatro Gran Rex |
| 16 August 2013 | Argentina | Buenos Aires | Teatro Gran Rex |
| 17 August 2013 | Argentina | Buenos Aires | Teatro Gran Rex |
| 18 August 2013 | Argentina | Buenos Aires | Teatro Gran Rex |
| 23 August 2013 | Argentina | Buenos Aires | Teatro Gran Rex |
| 24 August 2013 | Argentina | Buenos Aires | Teatro Gran Rex |
| 25 August 2013 | Argentina | Buenos Aires | Teatro Gran Rex |
| 27 August 2013 | Argentina | Buenos Aires | Teatro Gran Rex |
| 30 August 2013 | Argentina | Buenos Aires | Teatro Gran Rex |
| 31 August 2013 | Argentina | Buenos Aires | Teatro Gran Rex |
| 1 September 2013 | Argentina | Buenos Aires | Teatro Gran Rex |
| 5 September 2013 | Argentina | Buenos Aires | Teatro Gran Rex |
| 6 September 2013 | Argentina | Buenos Aires | Teatro Gran Rex |
| 7 September 2013 | Argentina | Buenos Aires | Teatro Gran Rex |
| 8 September 2013 | Argentina | Buenos Aires | Teatro Gran Rex |
| 10 September 2013 | Argentina | Buenos Aires | Teatro Gran Rex |
| 11 September 2013 | Argentina | Buenos Aires | Teatro Gran Rex |
| 14 September 2013 | Argentina | Buenos Aires | Teatro Gran Rex |
| 15 September 2013 | Argentina | Buenos Aires | Teatro Gran Rex |
| 28 September 2013 | Paraguay | Asunción | Polideportivo del Club Sol de América |
| 29 September 2013 | Paraguay | Asunción | Polideportivo del Club Sol de América |
| 3 October 2013 | Argentina | Santa Fé | Estadio Cubierto del Club Unión |
| 4 October 2013 | Argentina | Santa Fé | Estadio Cubierto del Club Unión |
| 6 October 2013 | Argentina | Rosario | Metropolitano |
| 7 October 2013 | Argentina | Rosario | Metropolitano |
| 9 October 2013 | Argentina | Neuquén | Estadio Ruca Che |
| 11 October 2013 | Chile | Santiago | Movistar Arena |
| 12 October 2013 | Chile | Santiago | Movistar Arena |
| 13 October 2013 | Chile | Santiago | Movistar Arena |
| 16 October 2013 | Argentina | Mendoza | Arena Maipú |
| 17 October 2013 | Argentina | Mendoza | Arena Maipú |
| 19 October 2013 | Argentina | Córdoba | Orfeo Superdomo |
| 20 October 2013 | Argentina | Córdoba | Orfeo Superdomo |
| 21 October 2013 | Argentina | Córdoba | Orfeo Superdomo |
| 26 October 2013 | Brazil | São Paulo | Credicard Hall |
| 27 October 2013 | Brazil | São Paulo | Credicard Hall |
| 28 October 2013 | Brazil | São Paulo | Credicard Hall |
| 2 November 2013 | Uruguay | Montevideo | Teatro de Verano |
| 3 November 2013 | Uruguay | Montevideo | Teatro de Verano |
| 6 November 2013 | Peru | Lima | Jockey Club Parcela H |
| 8 November 2013 | Mexico | Mexico City | Audi |
| 9 November 2013 | Mexico | Mexico City | Audi |
| 10 November 2013 | Mexico | Mexico City | Audi |
| 13 November 2013 | Guatemala | Guatemala City | Domo Polideportivo Zona 13 |
| 15 November 2013 | Venezuela | Valencia | Forum de Valencia |
| 16 November 2013 | Venezuela | Caracas | Poliedro de Caracas |
| 17 November 2013 | Venezuela | Caracas | Poliedro de Caracas |
Europe
| 29 November 2013 | Spain | Barcelona | Palau Sant Jordi |
| 30 November 2013 | Spain | Barcelona | Palau Sant Jordi |
| 1 December 2013 | Spain | Barcelona | Palau Sant Jordi |
| 4 December 2013 | Spain | Bilbao | Bilbao Arena |
| 5 December 2013 | Spain | Bilbao | Bilbao Arena |
| 6 December 2013 | Spain | Bilbao | Bilbao Arena |
| 7 December 2013 | Spain | Madrid | Palacio de Deportes de la Comunidad de Madrid |
| 8 December 2013 | Spain | Madrid | Palacio de Deportes de la Comunidad de Madrid |
| 10 December 2013 | Spain | Seville | Palacio Municipal de Deportes San Pablo |
| 12 December 2013 | Spain | Valencia | Pabellón Fuente de San Luis |
| 13 December 2013 | Spain | Valencia | Pabellón Fuente de San Luis |
| 14 December 2013 | Spain | Málaga | Palacio de Deportes José María Martín Carpena |
| 15 December 2013 | Spain | Málaga | Palacio de Deportes José María Martín Carpena |
| 3 January 2014 | Italy | Milan | Mediolanum Forum |
| 4 January 2014 | Italy | Milan | Mediolanum Forum |
| 5 January 2014 | Italy | Milan | Mediolanum Forum |
| 6 January 2014 | Italy | Bologna | Unipol Arena |
| 10 January 2014 | Italy | Rome | PalaLottomatica |
| 11 January 2014 | Italy | Rome | PalaLottomatica |
| 12 January 2014 | Italy | Rome | PalaLottomatica |
| 15 January 2014 | France | Paris | Grand Rex |
| 17 January 2014 | France | Paris | Grand Rex |
| 18 January 2014 | France | Paris | Grand Rex |
| 19 January 2014 | France | Paris | Grand Rex |
| 21 January 2014 | Italy | Naples | PalaPartenope |
| 22 January 2014 | Italy | Naples | PalaPartenope |
| 23 January 2014 | Italy | Naples | PalaPartenope |
| 25 January 2014 | Italy | Catania | PalaCatania |
| 26 January 2014 | Italy | Catania | PalaCatania |
| 28 January 2014 | Italy | Padua | PalaFabris |
| 29 January 2014 | Italy | Padua | PalaFabris |
| 31 January 2014 | Italy | Florence | Nelson Mandela Forum |
| 1 February 2014 | Italy | Florence | Nelson Mandela Forum |
| 2 February 2014 | Italy | Turin | Palasport Olimpico |
Latin America
| 28 February 2014 | Argentina | Buenos Aires | Estadio Luna Park |
| 1 March 2014 | Argentina | Buenos Aires | Estadio Luna Park |
| 2 March 2014 | Argentina | Buenos Aires | Estadio Luna Park |
| 3 March 2014 | Argentina | Buenos Aires | Estadio Luna Park |
| 4 March 2014 | Argentina | Buenos Aires | Estadio Luna Park |

=== Violetta Live ===
Violetta Live 2015 International Tour was the 2015 tour of the cast of Violetta. The tour was announced in August by the site bambini Italy. The cast toured several countries in Europe and Latin America.

List of performances
| Date | Country | City | Venue |
|---|---|---|---|
Europe
| 3 January 2015 | Spain | Madrid | Barclaycard Center |
| 4 January 2015 | Spain | Madrid | Barclaycard Center |
| 6 January 2015 | Spain | Zaragoza | Pabellón Príncipe Felipe |
| 10 January 2015 | Spain | Barcelona | Palau Sant Jordi |
| 11 January 2015 | Spain | Barcelona | Palau Sant Jordi |
| 14 January 2015 | Spain | Málaga | Palacio de Deportes José María Martín Carpena |
| 15 January 2015 | Spain | Málaga | Palacio de Deportes José María Martín Carpena |
| 17 January 2015 | Spain | Seville | Palacio Municipal de Deportes San Pablo |
| 18 January 2015 | Spain | Seville | Palacio Municipal de Deportes San Pablo |
| 23 January 2015 | Portugal | Lisbon | MEO Arena |
| 24 January 2015 | Portugal | Lisbon | MEO Arena |
| 25 January 2015 | Portugal | Lisbon | MEO Arena |
| 28 January 2015 | Italy | Turin | Pala Alpitour |
| 30 January 2015 | Italy | Milan | Mediolanum Forum |
| 31 January 2015 | Italy | Milan | Mediolanum Forum |
| 1 February 2015 | Italy | Bologna | Unipol Arena |
| 3 February 2015 | Italy | Florence | Nelson Mandela Forum |
| 4 February 2015 | Italy | Florence | Nelson Mandela Forum |
| 6 February 2015 | Italy | Rome | PalaLottomatica |
| 7 February 2015 | Italy | Rome | PalaLottomatica |
| 8 February 2015 | Italy | Rome | PalaLottomatica |
| 11 February 2015 | France | Lyon | Halle Tony Garnier |
| 12 February 2015 | France | Lyon | Halle Tony Garnier |
| 14 February 2015 | France | Toulouse | Zénith de Toulouse |
| 15 February 2015 | France | Toulouse | Zénith de Toulouse |
| 18 February 2015 | France | Paris | Zénith Paris |
| 19 February 2015 | France | Paris | Zénith Paris |
| 20 February 2015 | France | Paris | Zénith Paris |
| 21 February 2015 | France | Paris | Zénith Paris |
| 22 February 2015 | France | Paris | Zénith Paris |
| 24 February 2015 | France | Strasbourg | Zénith de Strasbourg |
| 25 February 2015 | France | Strasbourg | Zénith de Strasbourg |
| 27 February 2015 | France | Montpellier | Arena de Montpellier |
| 28 February 2015 | France | Montpellier | Arena de Montpellier |
| 3 March 2015 | France | Marseille | Le Dôme de Marseille |
| 4 March 2015 | France | Marseille | Le Dôme de Marseille |
| 7 March 2015 | France | Douai | Gayant Expo |
| 8 March 2015 | France | Douai | Gayant Expo |
| 11 March 2015 | Netherlands | Rotterdam | Sportpaleis van Ahoy |
| 13 March 2015 | Belgium | Brussels | Palais 12 |
| 14 March 2015 | Belgium | Brussels | Palais 12 |
| 15 March 2015 | Belgium | Brussels | Palais 12 |
| 18 March 2015 | France | Clermont-Ferrand | Zenith de Clermont-Ferrand |
| 21 March 2015 | Switzerland | Geneva | SEG Geneva Arena |
| 22 March 2015 | Switzerland | Geneva | SEG Geneva Arena |
| 26 March 2015 | Germany | Munich | Olympiahalle |
| 27 March 2015 | Germany | Munich | Olympiahalle |
| 29 March 2015 | Poland | Łódź | Atlas Arena |
Latin America
| 17 April 2015 | Argentina | Buenos Aires | Estadio Cubierto de Tecnópolis |
| 18 April 2015 | Argentina | Buenos Aires | Estadio Cubierto de Tecnópolis |
| 19 April 2015 | Argentina | Buenos Aires | Estadio Cubierto de Tecnópolis |
| 22 April 2015 | Uruguay | Montevideo | Estadio Gran Parque Central |
| 25 April 2015 | Argentina | Bahía Blanca | Club Midgistas del Sur |
| 2 May 2015 | Argentina | Resistencia | Estadio Centenario |
| 5 May 2015 | Paraguay | Asunción | Hipódromo de Asunción |
| 8 May 2015 | Argentina | Córdoba | Orfeo Superdomo |
| 9 May 2015 | Argentina | Córdoba | Orfeo Superdomo |
| 12 May 2015 | Argentina | Salta | Estadio Padre Ernesto Martearena |
| 15 May 2015 | Ecuador | Quito | Estadio Olímpico Atahualpa |
| 17 May 2015 | Ecuador | Guayaquil | Estadio Modelo Alberto Spencer Herrera |
| 20 May 2015 | Peru | Lima | Jockey Club Parcela H |
| 22 May 2015 | Mexico | Mexico City | Auditorio Nacional |
| 23 May 2015 | Mexico | Mexico City | Auditorio Nacional |
| 24 May 2015 | Mexico | Mexico City | Auditorio Nacional |
| 27 May 2015 | Mexico | Zapopan | Telmex Auditorium |
| 28 May 2015 | Mexico | Zapopan | Telmex Auditorium |
| 30 May 2015 | Mexico | Monterrey | Auditorio Banamex |
| 3 June 2015 | Colombia | Medellín | Plaza de Toros La Macarena |
| 6 June 2015 | Colombia | Bogotá | Centro de Eventos Autopista Norte |
| 7 June 2015 | Colombia | Barranquilla | Romelio Martínez Stadium |
| 10 June 2015 | Panama | Panama City | Figali Convention Center |
| 13 June 2015 | Dominican Republic | Santo Domingo | Estadio Quisqueya |
| 16 June 2015 | Bolivia | Santa Cruz de la Sierra | Estadio Ramón Tahuichi Aguilera |
| 19 June 2015 | Argentina | Mendoza | Arena Maipú |
| 20 June 2015 | Argentina | Mendoza | Arena Maipú |
| 23 June 2015 | Argentina | Tucumán | Club San Martín |
| 27 June 2015 | Brazil | São Paulo | Citibank Hall |
| 28 June 2015 | Brazil | São Paulo | Citibank Hall |
| 30 June 2015 | Brazil | Rio de Janeiro | HSBC Arena |
| 3 July 2015 | Chile | Santiago | Movistar Arena |
| 4 July 2015 | Chile | Santiago | Movistar Arena |
| 5 July 2015 | Chile | Santiago | Movistar Arena |
Europe
| 22 August 2015 | Poland | Warsaw | National Stadium, Warsaw |
| 25 August 2015 | Poland | Kraków | Tauron Arena Kraków |
| 26 August 2015 | Poland | Kraków | Tauron Arena Kraków |
| 29 August 2015 | Hungary | Budapest | László Papp Budapest Sports Arena |
| 30 August 2015 | Hungary | Budapest | László Papp Budapest Sports Arena |
| 2 September 2015 | Romania | Bucharest | Piața Constituției |
| 5 September 2015 | Austria | Vienna | Wiener Stadthalle |
| 6 September 2015 | Austria | Vienna | Wiener Stadthalle |
| 11 September 2015 | Italy | Verona | Verona Arena |
| 13 September 2015 | Italy | Pesaro | Adriatic Arena |
| 15 September 2015 | France | Paris | Zénith Paris |
| 16 September 2015 | France | Paris | Zénith Paris |
| 19 September 2015 | France | Nantes | Zénith de Nantes |
| 20 September 2015 | France | Nantes | Zénith de Nantes |
| 22 September 2015 | France | Bordeaux | Patinoire de Mériadeck |
| 23 September 2015 | France | Bordeaux | Patinoire de Mériadeck |
| 26 September 2015 | Germany | Stuttgart | Hanns-Martin-Schleyer-Halle |
| 27 September 2015 | Germany | Stuttgart | Hanns-Martin-Schleyer-Halle |
| 13 October 2015 | Germany | Berlin | Mercedes-Benz Arena |
| 17 October 2015 | Germany | Oberhausen | König Pilsener Arena |
| 18 October 2015 | Belgium | Antwerp | Sportpaleis |
| 20 October 2015 | Germany | Cologne | Lanxess Arena |
| 23 October 2015 | Germany | Hamburg | Barclaycard Arena |
| 24 October 2015 | Germany | Hamburg | Barclaycard Arena |
| 27 October 2015 | Germany | Frankfurt | Festhalle Frankfurt |
| 28 October 2015 | Germany | Frankfurt | Festhalle Frankfurt |
| 31 October 2015 | France | Nice | Palais Nikaïa |
| 1 November 2015 | France | Nice | Palais Nikaïa |

== In other media ==
=== Music ===
Throughout the series, "En mi mundo" is used as the opening and the ending (except in some cases for the latter). In Brazil, a Portuguese version is sung by Mayra Arduini (from College 11) with the name "Em Meu Mundo". In Italy, Stoessel sings the Italian version titled "Nel mio mondo", In France, Cynthia sung a French version of the theme song called "Dans Mon Monde" for the French release of Cantar es lo que soy. The English version, called "In My Own World", was released on iTunes Ireland on 9 August 2013. Russia also used a dubbed version of the theme song.

On 10 July 2015, along with the release of the show on Netflix, Walt Disney Records put up a compilation album called Violetta: En mi mundo containing 13 songs from Violetta and Cantar es lo que soy for the United States.

| Album and details | Peak positions | | | | | | | | Certifications |
| Album and details | BEL (Vl) | BEL (Wa) | BRA | FRA | ITA | ESP | POL | POR | Certifications |
|---|---|---|---|---|---|---|---|---|---|
| Violetta: Released: 5 June 2012; Label: Walt Disney; Formats: CD, digital download; Songwriters: Nicolas Fromentel (alias Sebastián Mellino), Eduardo Frigerio | 41 | 22 | 28 | 15 | 1 | 2 | 3 | 1 | ARG: 4× Platinum; CHI: Gold; COL: Gold; ESP: Platinum; ITA: Platinum; POL: 2× Platinum; BRA: Gold; URU: Platinum; VEN: Platinum |
| Cantar es lo que soy: Released: 23 November 2012; Label: Walt Disney; Formats: CD, digital download; Songwriters: Nicolas Fromentel (alias Sebastián Mellino), Eduardo Frigerio | — | — | — | — | 1 | — | 5 | — | ARG: 3× Platinum; CHI: Gold; COL: Gold; ITA: Platinum; POL: Gold; URU: Platinum; VEN: Gold |
| La Musica è Il Mio Mondo – Le Canzioni Inedite / La Música es Mi Mundo: Released: 15 March 2013; Label: Walt Disney; Formats: CD, digital download | — | — | — | — | — | 1 | — | 1 | |
| Hoy somos más: Released: 11 June 2013; Label: Walt Disney; Formats: CD, digital download; Songwriters: Itziar Martinez, Silvio L Richetto, Eduardo Frigerio, Nicolas Fromentel (alias Sebastián Mellino) | 42 | 12 | — | 14 | — | 1 | 1 | 1 | ARG: 2× Platinum; ITA: Platinum; POL: 2× Platinum |
| Violetta en Vivo: Released: 25 November 2013; Label: Walt Disney; Formats: CD, digital download; Songwriters: Itziar Martinez, Silvio L Richetto, Eduardo Frigerio, Nicolas Fromentel (alias Sebastián Mellino) | 60 | 13 | — | 4 | — | — | 1 | — | POL: Gold |
| Violetta en Concierto / Violetta il Concerto: Released: 1 April 2014; Label: Walt Disney; Formats: CD, digital download; Songwriter: | — | — | — | — | — | 2 | — | 1 | ITA: Gold |
| Gira mi canción: Released: 18 July 2014; Label: Walt Disney; Formats: CD, digital download | 14 | 5 | — | 2 | — | 4 | 11 | 1 | ITA: Gold; POL: Gold |
| Crecimos juntos: Released: 20 April 2015; Label: Walt Disney; Formats: CD, digital download | 14 | 7 | — | 6 | — | 4 | — | 20 | POL: Gold |
"—" denotes releases that did not chart or were not released in that region.

=== Magazine ===
From 10 October 2012, the official magazine of the series entitled Violetta was available in Italy. The monthly magazine was directed by Veronica Di Lisio and offered interviews, unpublished photographs of the series and even games, posters and rubrics for the female audience. In Argentina, it was also published in a magazine with the same content as the Italian one. In Chile, it was able to be purchased from 21 December 2012. Even in Portugal and Spain, there was the monthly magazine dedicated to the telenovela.

=== Sticker album ===
On the same day it was published in the magazine, it was also released on the sticker album, affordable attached to the magazine or individually. The album was published by Panini.

=== Video game ===
A Violetta video game has been released, called Disney Violetta: Rhythm & Music developed by Game Machine Studios and published by Little Orbit in collaboration with Disney Interactive Studios. The game was released on Wii, Nintendo DS and 3DS systems in 2014. "Junto A Ti" is featured in Just Dance 2016, while "En Mi Mundo" and "Hoy Somos Más" are featured on Just Dance: Disney Party 2.

=== Other products ===
Other products have also been published on the market like Easter eggs and notebooks (in Brazil). In addition, the Italian actor Simon Lijoi had created his column titled "Chiedilo a Simone" where fans via his Facebook page asked some questions and he answered; the first article was published on 22 March 2013, and was later published every Thursday.
