= Loretta (Warrenton, Virginia) =

Historic house in Virginia, United States

- U.S. National Register of Historic Places
- Virginia Landmarks Register
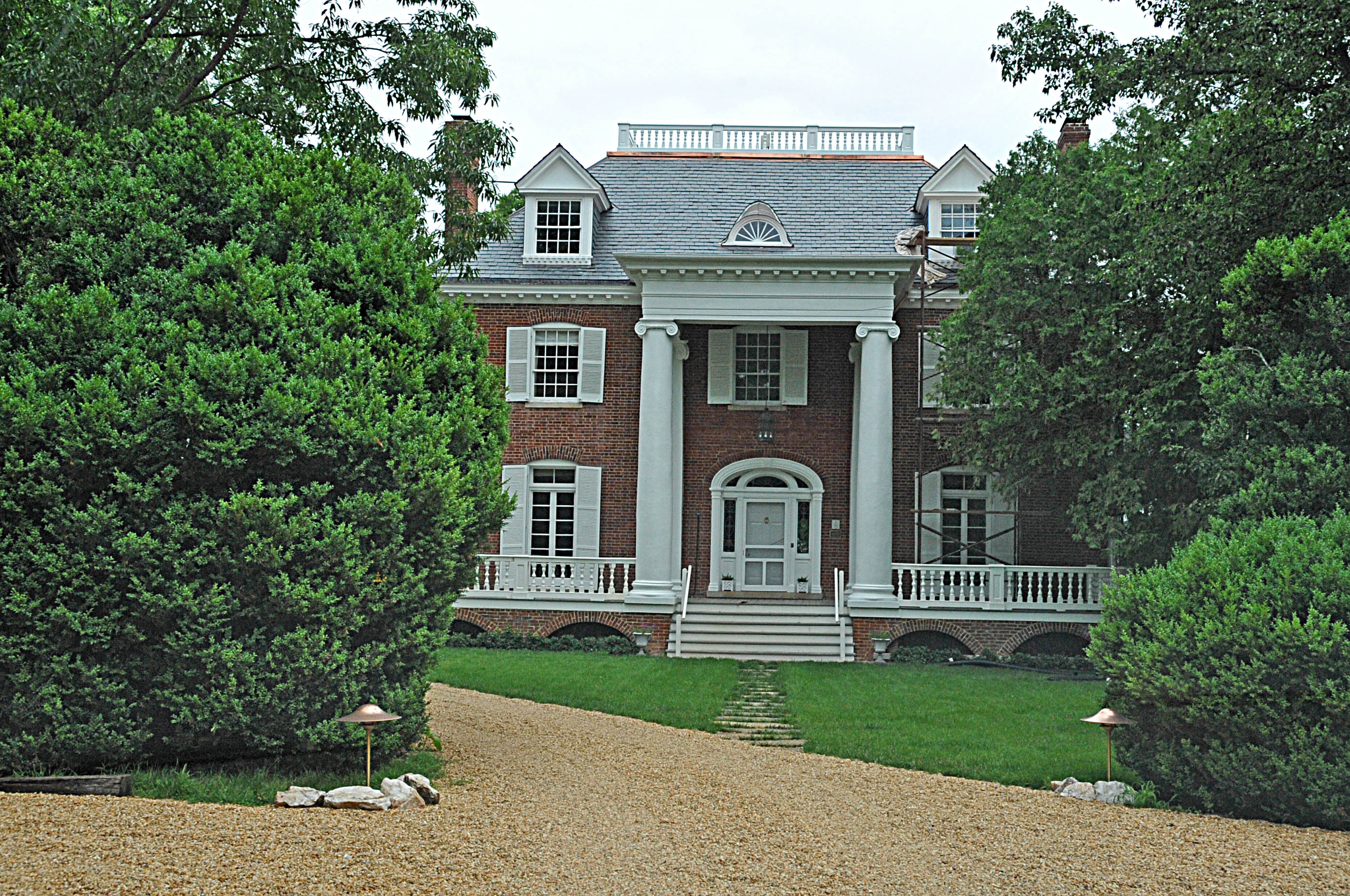

- Location within Northern Virginia Location within Virginia Location within the United States
- Location: East side of US 17, 3,500 feet (1,100 m) north of Warrenton town limits, near Warrenton, Virginia
- Coordinates: 38°44′48″N 77°48′35″W
- Area: 77 acres (31 ha)
- Built: c. 1800, 1907-1908
- Architectural style: Colonial Revival
- NRHP reference No.: 93001442
- VLR No.: 030-0035

Significant dates
- Added to NRHP: December 23, 1993
- Designated VLR: October 20, 1993

Loretta, also known as Edmonium, is a historic home located near Warrenton, Fauquier County, Virginia. The house was originally constructed about 1800 as a two-story. single-pile dwelling. In 1907–1908, it was remodeled in the Colonial Revival style. It is a 2 1/2-story, L-shaped, three-bay, brick house with a hipped roof built over a raised basement. In addition to the main house the property includes a smokehouse, and a well, both of which date to the early 19th century; and two barns, a corncrib, and two tenant houses, which all date to the early 20th century.

It was listed on the National Register of Historic Places in 1993.
