= Lauretta, Prince Edward Island =

Locality in Prince Edward Island, Canada

Coordinates: 46.859°N 64.148°W

Location of Lauretta in Prince Edward Island

Lauretta is a locality in the Canadian province of Prince Edward Island, located in Prince County.
