= Loretta Carter Hanes =

American educator

- Born: Loretta Carter; May 9, 1926; Washington, D.C., U.S.
- Died: August 21, 2016 (aged 90); Washington, D.C., U.S.
- Occupation(s): Educator, activist
- Known for: Reading is Fundamental, DC Emancipation Day

Loretta Carter Hanes (May 9, 1926 – August 21, 2016) was an American educator and activist based in Washington, D.C., known for her leadership with Reading is Fundamental and for reviving the celebration of D.C. Emancipation Day.

== Early life and education ==
Carter was born in Washington, D.C., the daughter of Joseph Washington Carter and Hattie Louise Thompson. Her mother was a cook at a nursing home. Carter was descended from people who were enslaved at George Washington's Mount Vernon estate, and who were emancipated in his will. She owned some pieces of china related to that family history. She worked in the War Department during World War II, and graduated from Miner Teachers College in 1949. She pursued further studies at the Washington Conservatory of Music.

== Career ==
=== Education and literacy ===
Hanes taught in the segregated public schools of Washington, D.C., and ran an after-school tutoring program with her husband in their home. She was a member of D.C. Citizens for Better Public Education, and in 1966 worked with Margaret McNamara to found Reading Is Fundamental (RIF), a national children's literacy program. She served on the District of Columbia's RIF board beginning in 1974, and was its executive director from 1981.

=== Emancipation commemorations ===
Hanes had an avid interest in African-American history and genealogy, especially in the District of Columbia. In the 1990s she and other activists succeeded in getting an original manuscript draft of the Emancipation Proclamation displayed at the National Archives, and Hanes cut the ribbon when the exhibit opened.

Hanes organized an Emancipation Day celebration at Washington's All Souls Church, Unitarian in 1991. The celebration gained support from the National Park Service in 1992. In 1994, she worked through an Illinois congressman, Don Manzullo, to arrange for the bells at Washington's Old Post Office Pavilion to ring on the date. In 1996, Mayor Marion Barry declared April 16 Emancipation Day in the District of Columbia. In 2005, D.C. Emancipation Day an official public holiday in the city. Representative Manzullo read a tribute to Hanes's work into the Congressional Record in 1997. In 2006, Hanes was the subject of an oral history interview and documentary by Ayo Handy-Kendi. She maintained the holiday's tradition of a laying a wreath at the African American Civil War Memorial Museum. "People ask, 'Why are you stirring this up?'", she explained in 2007. "It's healing to me. I'm sure it will be healing to others."

== Personal life ==
Carter married World War II veteran Wesley Clement Hanes. They had three children; son Jeffery died as a baby in 1960. Her husband died in 2010, and she died in 2016, at the age of 90, in Washington, D.C. Her grave is with her husband's and son's, in Arlington National Cemetery. Her papers are in the DC History Center.
