= Damien Lauretta =

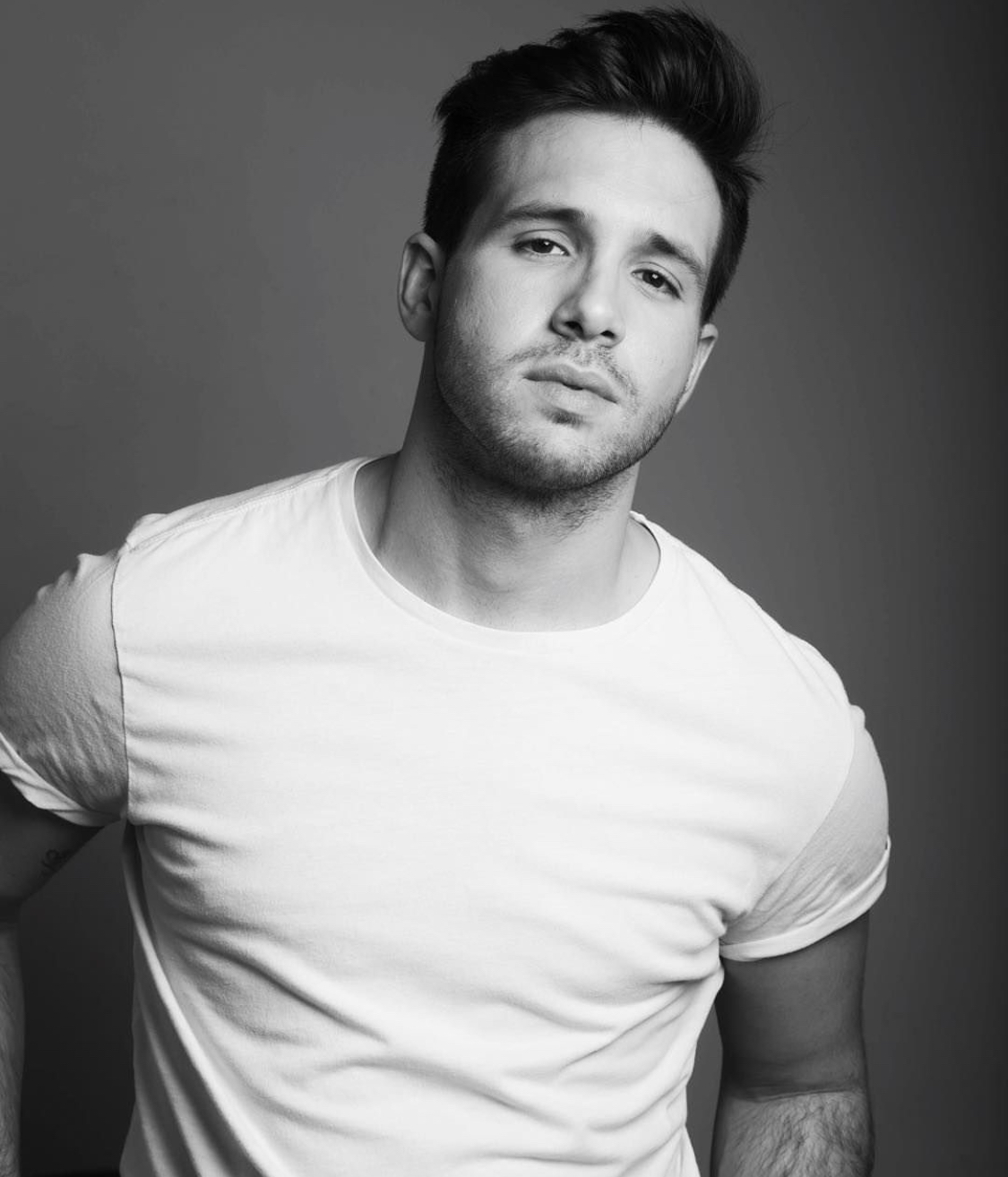
- Damien Lauretta

Background information
- Born: 18 March 1992 (age 34); Cannes, France
- Occupations: singer, record producer, songwriter, actor

Damien Lauretta (born 18 March 1992, in Cannes) is a French singer, record producer, songwriter and actor.

== Life and career ==
He participated in several music programs, such as the Bataille des chorales (TF1), and Le Grand show des enfants (TF1). But his first real appearance on television was when he participated at The X Factor (M6) in 2011. He joined the group “2nd Nature” before being eliminated in 6th prime.

In 2014, he return on the screen, play one of the main role in «Dreams : 1 Rêve 2 Vies», series recorded in Saint Martin and broadcast on NRJ 12.

From 2014 to 2015, he played Clément/Alex in the third season of the famous Disney Channel Original Latin American series Violetta. He is the first French to work with Disney Channel International. He lived for one year in Buenos Aires, Argentina.

In 2016 his first music is “Fall in Love” with 1 000 000 views on YouTube. The video clip was filmed in Bogota (Colombia).

The same year, for the tribute album of Daniel Balavoine; Balavoine(s), he made a cover of "Quand on arrive en ville" a song extract of the French musical Starmania

His 2017’ single "Dreamin" has been #1 of charts in Canada. (Québec)

In 2019 he released a single "Calle Verdi".

Then, Damien Lauretta released 1 new singles: “La Mer” (March 13, 2020).

He released his first album solo on January 14, 2022 titled "French Riviera"

== Filmography ==
Year	Title	Role	Notes
2011	X-Factor	Himself	Participant
2014	Dreams: 1 Rêve 2 Vies	Luka	Main role
2014–2015	Violetta	Clément / Alex	Main role (season 3)

== Discography ==
Year	Title	Label	Notes
2016	Fall in Love	Universal Music France	
2017	Dreamin’	Universal Music France	Number One in Canada’s charts
2019	Calle Verdi	Sony Music France and LRTA Music	
2020	La Mer	Sony Music France and LRTA Music	
2021	Paradoxal	LRTA Music	Number 15 in Canada’s charts
2021	Plexyglass	LRTA Music	
2021	Ose-moi	LRTA Music	Number 15 in Canada’s charts
2022	French Riviera	LRTA Music	First album solo
