= Laurette (given name) =

Laurette is a female given name, a diminutive of the name Laura.

== People with this name ==
- Laurette, wife of 12th century European nobleman Henry IV, Count of Luxembourg
- Laurette, daughter of 12th century European nobleman Baldwin IV, Count of Hainaut
- Laurette, the model for Matisse painting The Painter and His Model
- Laurette Beckwith (1896–1958), American politician
- Laurette de Commercy, wife of 13th century European nobleman John, Count of Chalon
- Laurette Marcia Laura Gemser (born 1950), Indonesian-Dutch actress, model and costume designer
- Laurette Goldberg (1932–2005), founder of the Philharmonia Baroque Orchestra in San Francisco
- Laurette Koellner, American business executive
- Laurette de Looz, wife of 12th century European nobleman Theobald I, Count of Bar
- Laurette Luez (1928–1999), American actress and model
- Laurette Maritz (born 1964), South African professional golfer
- Laurette Onkelinx (born 1958), Belgian politician
- Laurette Huggins Reviere (died 1992), American victim of serial killer Nathaniel White
- Laurette Séjourné (1911–2003), Mexican archeologist and ethnologist
- Laurette Spang-McCook (born 1951), American television actress
- Laurette Stivers, British-based American singer-songwriter
- Laurette Taylor (1883–1946), American stage and silent film star
- Laurette Tuckerman (born 1956), French and American mathematical physicist

== Fictional characters ==
- Laurette, title character in 18th-century English gothic novel The Orphan of the Rhine
- Laurette, in 19th-century French novel Servitude et grandeur militaires
- Laurette, in Belgian opéra comique Richard Coeur-de-lion
- Laurette, in French opéra comique La chanson de Fortunio
- Laurette, in Italian opéra comique Le peintre amoureux de son modèle (not about Matisse)
- Laurette, in French opérette Le docteur Miracle
- Laurette, in 1941 American novel What Makes Sammy Run?
- Laurette Fillbrandt, in American radio soap opera Girl Alone
- Laurette de Latour, in 1955 swashbuckler film The Purple Mask
- Laurette Sincee, in 1946 American play Another Part of the Forest
- Laurette Wilder, in 1995 film In the Name of Love: A Texas Tragedy

== See also ==
- Loretta
- Madame Laurette Messimy, in List of rose cultivars named after people
