= Dead Loretta =

American psychedelic rock band

Dead Loretta was a psychedelic rock band from Newark, Delaware. Formed in 2004, Dead Loretta got its start when songwriters Danny Boles and Marky Degz decided to expand their acoustic duo project "Bruce Lee's Grave" into a four-piece rock band. Heavily influenced by 1960s British Invasion and local pop heroes The Spinto Band, the original lineup consisted of Degz on lead vocals/guitar, Boles on lead guitar/vocals, Brian Lafferty on bass/harmonica, Andrew Kerstetter on drums, and Alex McGrellis on keyboards.

== History ==
Dead Loretta played its first show in June 2005 at My Place Tavern in Dover, opening for the band She Slash He. Later that same year, the group released an EP entitled Bring A Date. The five song disc included a jangly pop number called "Miranda", which caught the ear of Vanstock Records owner Dwight Lyghtning, who immediately signed the band. Miranda enjoyed airplay in Delaware's 93.7 WSTW and New York's WECW 107.7. Shortly thereafter, as the band began work on their full-length album Max Pressman joined. Alex left the band to pursue acting, eventually landing a role in Rocky VI.

With a new drummer and a record deal, Dead Loretta began recording their full length self-titled album, with Brett Stewart of Deep Groove Studios. Degz penned the singles "Symphony of Wasted Youth" & "Brooklyn", while Boles contributed "Spain vs. Portugal" & "Dirt Bike". During this time, the band shared the stage with various international acts, including Pete Doherty's side project Littl'ans, legendary Smashing Orange front man Rob Montejo, Brian Jonestown Massacre collaborator Christopher Tucker, and Rolling Stone Magazine featured band The Singles. Despite Dead Loretta's progress, they were abruptly dropped from Vanstock Records after Degz and Dwight Lyghtning engaged in a heated altercation midway through a show at Mojo 13 in Wilmington in December 2007. Degz reportedly threw his guitar to the ground and stormed out of the club amidst a hailstorm of boos and heckling from rowdy audience members. This would be the band's final live performance. The full-length album, to this date, has not been released.

== Discography ==
- Bring A Date (Vanstock, 2005)
- Dead Loretta Live @ Mojo13 (Vanstock, 2007)
- "Brooklyn" Mojo Compilation CD (Deep Groove 2007)
