= Nico (given name) =

Nico is a unisex given name.

== People ==
Notable people with the name include:

- Nico Aaltonen (born 1988), Finnish ice hockey player
- Nico Abegglen (born 1990), Swiss footballer
- Nico Antonitsch (born 1991), Austrian footballer
- Nico Archambault (born 1984), Canadian dancer and choreographer
- Nico Assumpção (1954–2001), Brazilian bass player
- Nico Baleani (born 1992), Spanish footballer
- Nico Baracchi (1957–2015), Swiss bobsledder
- Nico Berg (born 1973), Canadian soccer player
- Nico Bettge (born 1980), German slalom canoeist
- Nico Beyer (born 1964), German film director and producer
- Nico Binst (born 1992), Belgian footballer
- Nicolaas Bloembergen (1920–2017), Dutch and American physicist and Nobel laureate
- Nico Bodonczy (born 1955), Chilean-American soccer player
- Nico Boje (born 1973), South African cricketer
- Nico H.J. van den Boogaard (1938–1982), Dutch medievalist scholar
- Nico Bouvy (1892–1957), Dutch footballer
- Nico Braun (born 1950), Luxembourgian footballer
- Nico de Bree (1944–2016), Dutch football goalkeeper
- Nico van Breemen (born 1942), Dutch soil scientist
- Nico Broekhuysen (1876–1958), Dutch teacher and inventor of korfball
- Nico Brüngger (born 1988), Swiss cyclist
- Nico Burchert (born 1987), German footballer
- Nico van der Burgt (born 1983), Dutch paratriathlete
- Nico Buwalda (1890–1970), Dutch footballer
- Nico Carstens (1926–2016), South African accordionist and songwriter
- Nico Carvacho (born 1997), Chilean-American basketball player in the Israeli Basketball Premier League
- Nico Casavecchia (born 1961), Argentine director
- Nico Castel (1931–2015), Multinational operatic tenor
- Nico Claesen (born 1962), Belgian footballer
- Nico Colaluca (born 1986), American soccer player
- Nico Collard (born 1970s), American music director, producer, and guitarist
- Nico Collins (born 1999), American football player
- Nico Covatti (born 1988), Argentine motorcycle speedway rider
- Nico Däbritz (born 1971), German footballer
- Nico Kenn De Balinthazy, better known as Sneako (born 1998), American internet personality
- Nico de Boinville (born 1989), English jockey
- Nico F. Declercq (born 1975), Belgian physicist and mechanical engineer
- Nico Delle Karth (born 1984), Austrian sailor
- Nico Denz (born 1994), German cyclist
- Nico Dewalque (born 1945), Belgian footballer
- Nico Diederichs (1903–1978), South African State President
- Nico Dijkshoorn (born 1960), Dutch author, columnist, and musician
- Nico Dostal (1895–1981), Austrian operetta and film music composer
- Nico Drost (born 1980), Dutch politician
- Nico Eekman (1889–1973), Belgian figurative painter
- Nico Elorde (born 1991), Filipino basketball player
- Nico Elvedi (born 1996), Swiss footballer
- Nico Emonds (born 1961), Belgian cyclist
- Nico Empen (born 1996), German footballer
- Nico Esterhuyse (born 1984), Namibian rugby player
- Nico Evers-Swindell (born 1979), New Zealand actor
- Nico Falah (born 1995), American football player
- Nico Fidenco (1933–2022), Italian singer
- Nico Freriks (born 1981), Dutch volleyball player
- Nico Frijda (1927–2015), Dutch psychologist
- Nico Frommer (born 1978), German footballer
- Nico Frutos (born 1981), Argentine footballer
- Nico van Gageldonk (1913–1995), Dutch cyclist
- Nico Gaitán (born 1988), Argentine footballer
- Nico Gardener (1906–1989), British bridge player
- Nico González (footballer, born 1988), Spanish footballer
- Nico Gorzel (born 1998), German footballer
- Nico Granatowski (born 1991), German footballer
- Nico Gunzburg (1882–1984), Belgian lawyer and criminologist
- Nico Gunzelmann (born 2002), German politician
- Nico Gutjahr (born 1993), German footballer
- Nico de Haas (1907–1995), Dutch photographer and currency designer
- Nico Habermann (1932–1993), Dutch computer scientist
- Nico Hambro (1861–1926), Norwegian female politician (Nicoline)
- Nico Hammann (born 1988), German footballer
- Nico Hischier (born 1999), Swiss ice hockey player
- Nico Hülkenberg (born 1987), German Formula One driver
- Nico Iamaleava (born 2004), American football player
- Nico Jalink (born 1964), Dutch football player
- Nico Kasanda (1939–1985), Congo guitarist and composer
- Nico Landeweerd (born 1954), Dutch water polo player
- Nico Mannion (born 2001), Italian-American basketball player
- Nico Mbarga (1950–1997), Nigerian musician
- Nico Mirallegro (born 1991), British actor
- Nico Motchebon (born 1969), German runner
- Nico Muhly (born 1981), American contemporary classical composer
- Nico Naldini (1929–2020), Italian novelist, poet, and film director
- Nico Nyberg (born 1993), Finnish ice hockey player
- Nico Pulzetti (born 1984), Italian footballer
- Nico Pepe (1917–1987), Italian film actor
- Nico Perrone (born 1935), Italian journalist
- Nico Radicic (born c. 2005), American football player of Croatian descent
- Nico Rosberg (born 1985), German-Finnish former Formula One driver and 2016 Formula One World Champion
- Nico Rudolph (born 1989), German politician
- Nico Schrevel (1933–2000), Dutch political activist
- Nico Schulz (born 1993), German footballer
- Nico Siragusa (born 1994), American football player
- Nico Somaeb (born 1981), Namibian politician
- Nico Tortorella (born 1988), American actor
- Nico Vaesen (born 1969), Belgian footballer
- Nico Vascellari (born 1976) Italian artist and musician
- Nico Verhoeven (born 1961), Dutch cyclist
- Nico Williams (born 2002), Spanish footballer

== Nicknames ==
- Antonio Mariño Souto (born 1935), Cuban painter, known as Ñico
- Antônio Azambuja Nunes (born 1941), Brazilian footballer
- Diego Forcén Cabito (1916-2002), Spanish footballer
- Christa Päffgen (1938–1988), singer with The Velvet Underground
- Honório de Freitas Guimarães (1902–1968), member of the Brazilian Communist Party
- Klaus Peter Cadsky (1937–2011), Swiss cartoonist

== Fictional characters ==
- Niko Bellic, a character in the Grand Theft Auto video game series
- Nico Blake, female character from the British soap opera Hollyoaks
- Nico Collard, a main character in the Broken Sword series
- Nico di Angelo, a character in several book series by Rick Riordan
- Nico Kim, an attending orthopedic surgeon in Grey's Anatomy
- Nico von Lahnstein, female character from the German soap opera Verbotene Liebe
- Nico Minoru, a comic character who briefly went by the moniker "Sister Grimm" in Runaways
- Nico Reilly, a lead character in the TV series Lipstick Jungle
- Nico Robin, a manga character from One Piece
- Nicolas "Nico" M. Sinag, a main character in the TV series Dirty Linen
- Nicolas "Nico" Navarro, a character in Soy Luna
- Nico Saiba, a character in the TV series Kamen Rider Ex-Aid
- Nico Slater, a character in the TV series Ugly Betty
- Nico Toscani, a character in the 1988 film Above the Law
- Nico Wakatsuki (若月 ニコ), a character in the manga series Witch Watch
- Nico Yazawa, a character in the mixed media project Love Live! School Idol Project
- Nico, a bunny character from Carl the Collector
- Nico, a yellow canary in the film Rio and its sequel Rio 2
- NiCO, a character in the Dead or Alive video game series

== See also ==
- Nico (disambiguation)
- Niko (disambiguation)
- Niño (name)
- Nino (name)
