= Souto =

Souto may refer to:

== People ==
- Antonio Mariño Souto, Cuban painter
- Carlos Souto, Argentinian advertising executive
- Evelyna Bloem Souto, Brazilian civil engineer and academic at University of São Paulo
- Humberto Souto (1934–2025), Brazilian politician
- Rodrigo Souto, Brazilian footballer
- Ronny Souto, Cape Verdean footballer

== Places ==
=== Portugal ===
- Souto (Abrantes), a civil parish in the municipality of Abrantes
- Souto (Arcos de Valdevez), a civil parish in the municipality of Arcos de Valdevez
- Souto (Guimarães), a civil parish in the municipality of Guimarães
- Souto (Penedono), a civil parish in the municipality of Penedono
- Souto (Pombal), a civil parish in the municipality of Pombal
- Souto (Sabugal), a civil parish in the municipality of Sabugal
- Souto (Santa Maria da Feira), a civil parish in the municipality of Santa Maria da Feira
- Souto (São Salvador), a civil parish in the municipality of São Salvador
- Souto (Terras de Bouro), a civil parish in the municipality of Terras de Bouro
- Souto Maior (Sabrosa), a civil parish in the municipality of Sabrosa
- Souto Maior (Trancoso), a civil parish in the municipality of Trancoso

=== Spain ===
- Souto (A Coruña), a civil parish in the municipality of A Coruña
- Souto (Ourense), a civil parish in the municipality of Ourense
- Souto (O Carballiño), a civil parish in the municipality of O Carballiño
- Souto (Pontevedra), a civil parish in the province of Pontevedra
- Souto (Pantón), a civil parish in the municipality of Pantón
- Souto (Bóveda), a hamlet in the civil parish of Teilán in the municipality of Bóveda

Other variants

- Souto de Aguiar da Beira, a civil parish in the municipality of Aguiar da Beira
- Souto da Carpalhosa, a civil parish in the municipality of Leiria
- Souto da Casa, a civil parish in the municipality of Fundão
- Souto de Lafões, a civil parish in the municipality of Oliveira de Frades
- Souto da Velha, a civil parish in the municipality of Torre de Moncorvo

== See also ==
- Soto (disambiguation)
