= Nicco (disambiguation) =

Nicco most often refers to Nicco Maniatty (born 1977), an American singer.

Nicco may also refer to:

- Nicco (surname), an Italian surname
- A variant of the name Nicolas
- Nicco park, an amusement park located in Salt Lake City, Kolkata, India
- Nicco Marchiol (born 2003), American football quarterback

== See also ==
- Nico (disambiguation)
