= Nyberg (surname) =

Nyberg is a Swedish surname.

== Geographical distribution ==
As of 2014, 53.6% of all known bearers of the surname Nyberg were residents of Sweden (frequency 1:763), 23.6% of the United States (1:63,679), 12.2% of Finland (1:1,868), 4.5% of Norway (1:4,731), 1.6% of Canada (1:98,390) and 1.4% of Denmark (1:16,602).

In Sweden, the frequency of the surname was higher than national average (1:763) in the following counties:

1. Västernorrland County (1:252)
2. Gotland County (1:359)
3. Norrbotten County (1:371)
4. Västerbotten County (1:493)
5. Gävleborg County (1:504)
6. Dalarna County (1:542)
7. Uppsala County (1:648)
8. Västmanland County (1:761)

In Finland, the frequency of the surname was higher than national average (1:1,868) in the following regions:

1. Åland (1:489)
2. Ostrobothnia (1:610)
3. Uusimaa (1:901)
4. Central Ostrobothnia (1:1,393)

== People ==
- Anita Nyberg (born 1940), Swedish professor
- Arne Nyberg (1913–1970), Swedish footballer
- Arto Nyberg (born 1966), Finnish journalist
- Arvid Nyberg (1928–2022), Norwegian politician
- Björn Nyberg (1929–2004), Swedish fantasy author
- Börje Nyberg (1920–2005), Swedish actor and film director
- Carl Richard Nyberg (1858–1939), Swedish industrialist
- Claes Nyberg (born 1971), Swedish former long-distance runner
- Christina Nyberg (born 1962), Swedish chess player
- Eric Nyberg (born 19??), American computer scientist
- Eva Nyberg (born 1969), Swedish swimmer
- Evert Nyberg (1925–2000), Swedish long-distance runner
- Fredrik Nyberg (writer) (born 1968), Swedish writer
- Fredrik Nyberg (born 1969), Swedish alpine skier
- Gun-Britt Nyberg, Swedish orienteering competitor
- Henrik Samuel Nyberg (1889–1974), Swedish orientalist
- Herman Nyberg (1880–1968), Swedish sailor
- Ingeborg Nyberg (born 1940), Swedish singer and actress
- Jaakko Nyberg (born 1980), Finnish footballer
- John Nyberg (born 1996), Swedish professional ice hockey player, NHL
- Julia Nyberg (1784–1854), Swedish poet
- Kaisa Nyberg (born 1948), Finnish cryptographer
- Karen Nyberg (born 1969), American astronaut
- Katarina Nyberg (born 1965), Swedish curler
- Katja Nyberg (born 1979), Norwegian handball player
- Katja Nyberg (politician) (born 1971), Swedish politician
- Lars Nyberg (born 1951), Swedish Civilekonom and CEO of TeliaSonera
- Lina Nyberg (born 1970), Swedish jazz singer
- Mary Ann Nyberg (1923–1979), American costume designer
- Nico Nyberg (born 1993), Finnish ice hockey player
- René Nyberg (born 1946), Finnish diplomat and a former CEO of East Office
- Renée Nyberg (born 1966), Swedish television presenter and journalist
- Thomas Nyberg (born 1962), Swedish sprinter
