= Volleyball at the 2004 Summer Olympics – Men's North American qualification =

The North American Qualification Tournament for the 2004 Men's Olympic Volleyball Tournament was held in Caguas, Puerto Rico from 4 to 10 January 2004.

== Venue ==
- Coliseo Héctor Solá Bezares, Caguas, Puerto Rico

== Preliminary round ==
Pos	Team	Pld	W	L	Pts	SW	SL	SR	SPW	SPL	SPR	Qualification
1	United States	4	4	0	8	12	1	12.000	333	266	1.252	Semifinals
2	Cuba	4	3	1	7	10	6	1.667	371	363	1.022	Semifinals
3	Puerto Rico	4	1	3	5	6	10	0.600	343	362	0.948	Semifinals
4	Canada	4	1	3	5	5	9	0.556	338	337	1.003	Semifinals
5	Mexico	4	1	3	5	4	11	0.364	302	359	0.841	

Date		Score		Set 1	Set 2	Set 3	Set 4	Set 5	Total
4 Jan	Cuba	3–1	Canada	26–24	25–22	16–25	30–28		97–99
4 Jan	Mexico	3–2	Puerto Rico	25–22	17–25	25–23	23–25	15–13	105–108
5 Jan	United States	3–0	Mexico	28–26	25–14	25–16			78–56
5 Jan	Puerto Rico	3–1	Canada	23–25	25–21	25–23	25–21		98–90
6 Jan	Canada	3–0	Mexico	25–22	25–19	25–19			75–60
6 Jan	United States	3–1	Cuba	25–16	25–21	23–25	25–22		98–84
7 Jan	United States	3–0	Canada	27–25	30–28	25–21			82–74
7 Jan	Cuba	3–1	Puerto Rico	25–18	17–25	25–19	25–23		92–85
8 Jan	Cuba	3–1	Mexico	25–22	25–17	23–25	25–17		98–81
8 Jan	United States	3–0	Puerto Rico	25–18	25–17	25–17			75–52

== Final round ==
Semifinals
9 January
United States	3
Canada	0
9 January
Cuba	3
Puerto Rico	1

Final
10 January
United States	3
Cuba	2
3rd place match
10 January
Canada	3
Puerto Rico	2

=== Semifinals ===
Date		Score		Set 1	Set 2	Set 3	Set 4	Set 5	Total
9 Jan	United States	3–0	Canada	27–25	27–25	25–16			79–66
9 Jan	Cuba	3–1	Puerto Rico	25–18	17–25	25–19	25–23		92–85

=== 3rd place match ===
Date		Score		Set 1	Set 2	Set 3	Set 4	Set 5	Total
10 Jan	Canada	3–2	Puerto Rico	23–25	25–23	23–25	25–18	15–10	111–101

=== Final ===
Date		Score		Set 1	Set 2	Set 3	Set 4	Set 5	Total
10 Jan	United States	3–2	Cuba	21–25	25–18	24–26	25–22	15–13	110–104

== Final standing ==
Rank	Team
1	United States
2	Cuba
3	Canada
4	Puerto Rico
5	Mexico

Qualified for the 2004 Summer Olympics
Qualified for the 2004 World Olympic Qualification Tournaments
