= 1975 Miami Toros indoor season =

Miami Toros
1975 season
- General manager: Dr. Greg Myers
- Manager: Dr. Greg Myers
- Stadium: Bayfront Center
- NASL: Region 3: Second place
- Top goalscorer: League: (United States) Nico Bodonczy (6 goals); All: (United States) Nico Bodonczy (6 goals)
- Average home league attendance: 4,235
Home colors	Away colors

The 1975 Miami Toros indoor season was the first season of the new team in the new North American Soccer League indoor tournament. It was part of the club's ninth season in professional soccer. This year, the team finished in second place in Region 3, losing on goal-differential. They did not make the playoffs as only the top team in each of the four regions were selected.

== Competitions ==
=== NASL indoor regular season ===
==== Region 3 ====
played at the Bayfront Center in St. Petersburg, Florida

February 17	Miami Toros	11–8	Baltimore Comets	Attendance: 4,437

Tampa Bay Rowdies	7–2	Washington Diplomats

February 19	Miami Toros	7–4	Washington Diplomats	Attendance: 4,032

Tampa Bay Rowdies	8–6	Baltimore Comets

Pos	Team	G	W	L	GF	GA	GD	PTS
1	Tampa Bay Rowdies	2	2	0	15	8	+7	4
2	Miami Toros	2	2	0	18	12	+6	4
3	Baltimore Comets	2	0	2	14	19	-5	0
4	Washington Diplomats	2	0	2	6	14	-8	0

*Tampa Bay wins region on goal differential, advances to semifinals

== See also ==
- 1975 Miami Toros indoor
