= Volleyball at the 2004 Summer Olympics – Men's tournament =

Men's volleyball at the Games of the XXVIII Olympiad
- Venue: Peace and Friendship Stadium
- Date: 15–29 August
- Competitors: 144 from 12 nations

Medalists
1st place, gold medalist(s)		Brazil (2nd title)
2nd place, silver medalist(s)		Italy
3rd place, bronze medalist(s)		Russia

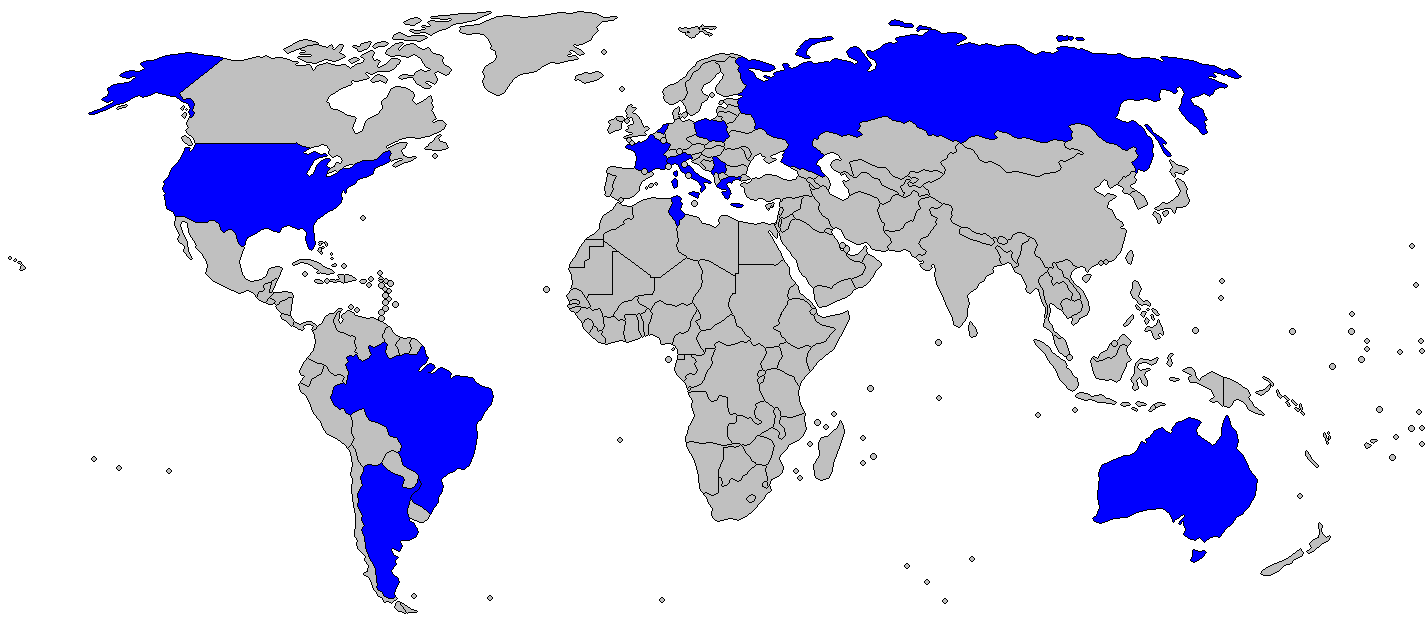
Competing teams

The men's tournament in volleyball at the 2004 Summer Olympics was the 11th edition of the event at the Summer Olympics, organized by the world's governing body, the FIVB in conjunction with the IOC. It was held in Athens, Greece from 15 to 29 August 2004.

== Competition schedule ==
P	Preliminary round	¼	Quarter-finals	½	Semi-finals	B	Bronze medal match	F	Gold medal match

Sun 15	Mon 16	Tue 17	Wed 18	Thu 19	Fri 20	Sat 21	Sun 22	Mon 23	Tue 24	Wed 25	Thu 26	Fri 27	Sat 28	Sun 29	
P		P		P		P		P		¼		½		B	F

== Qualification ==
Means of qualification	Date	Host	Vacancies	Qualified
Host country	5 September 1997	(Switzerland) Lausanne	1	Greece
2003 World Cup	16–30 November 2003	Japan	3	Brazil
2003 World Cup	16–30 November 2003	Japan	3	Italy
2003 World Cup	16–30 November 2003	Japan	3	Serbia and Montenegro
African Qualifier	5–10 January 2004	(Tunisia) Tunis	1	Tunisia
European Qualifier	5–10 January 2004	(Germany) Leipzig	1	Russia
North American Qualifier	4–10 January 2004	(Puerto Rico) Caguas	1	United States
South American Qualifier	9–11 January 2004	(Venezuela) Caracas	1	Argentina
1st World Qualifier	21–23 May 2004	(Portugal) Matosinhos	1	Poland
2nd World Qualifier	22–30 May 2004	(Japan) Tokyo	1	France
Asian Qualifier*	22–30 May 2004	(Japan) Tokyo	1	Australia
3rd World Qualifier	28–30 May 2004	(Spain) Madrid	1	Netherlands
Total			12	

* The Asian Qualifier was combined with the 2nd World Qualifier. The first place team of the tournament qualified as the 2nd World Qualifier winners, while the best Asian team except the 2nd World Qualifier winners qualified as the Asian Qualifier winners.

== Pools composition ==
Teams were seeded following the serpentine system according to their FIVB World Ranking as of January 2004. FIVB reserved the right to seed the hosts as head of pool A regardless of the World Ranking. Rankings are shown in brackets except the hosts.

Pool A	Pool B
Greece (Hosts)	Brazil (1)
Serbia and Montenegro (3)	Italy (2)
France (4)	Russia (5)
Argentina (8)	United States (6)
Poland (9)	Netherlands (12)
Tunisia (22)	Australia (21)

== Venue ==
All matches
Piraeus, Athens, Greece
Peace and Friendship Stadium
Capacity: 10,520
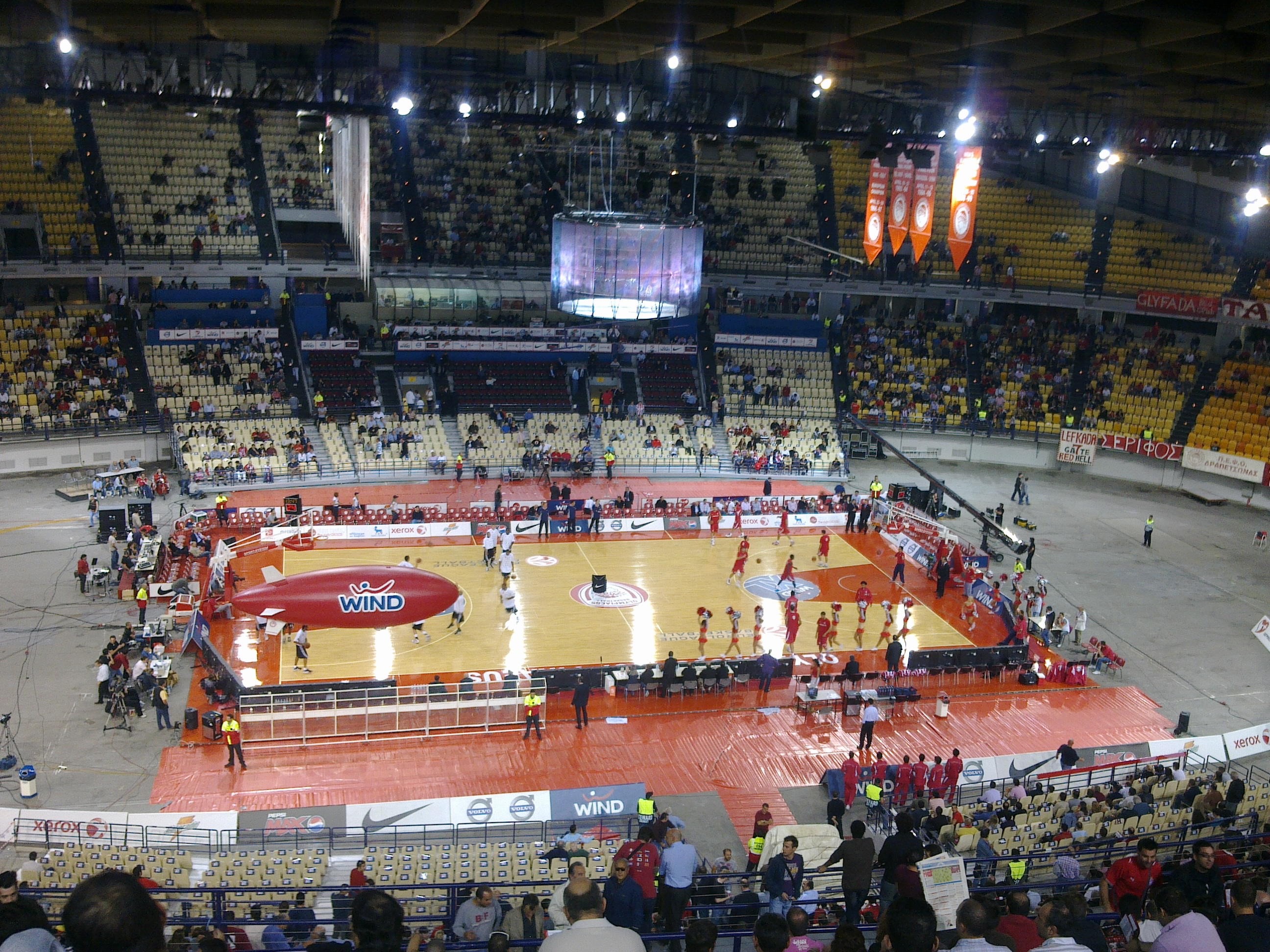

== Preliminary round ==
- All times are Eastern European Summer Time (UTC+03:00).
- The top four teams in each pool qualified for the quarterfinals.

=== Pool A ===
Pos	Team	Pld	W	L	Pts	SW	SL	SR	SPW	SPL	SPR	Qualification
1	Serbia and Montenegro	5	4	1	9	12	6	2.000	427	398	1.073	Quarterfinals
2	Greece	5	3	2	8	12	9	1.333	475	454	1.046	Quarterfinals
3	Argentina	5	3	2	8	12	9	1.333	471	457	1.031	Quarterfinals
4	Poland	5	3	2	8	10	9	1.111	422	419	1.007	Quarterfinals
5	France	5	2	3	7	8	10	0.800	405	394	1.028	
6	Tunisia	5	0	5	5	4	15	0.267	373	451	0.827	

Source: FIVB

15 August 2004; 09:00	Serbia and Montenegro	0–3	Poland	Peace and Friendship Stadium; Attendance: 2,000; Referees: Bela Hobor (HUN), Luciano Gaspari (ITA)
15 August 2004; 09:00	(21–25, 17–25, 16–25) result			Peace and Friendship Stadium; Attendance: 2,000; Referees: Bela Hobor (HUN), Luciano Gaspari (ITA)

15 August 2004; 14:00	Argentina	3–0	France	Peace and Friendship Stadium; Attendance: 2,370; Referees: Ning Wang (CHN), Hiroyuki Ito (JPN)
15 August 2004; 14:00	(25–15, 25–23, 25–22) result			Peace and Friendship Stadium; Attendance: 2,370; Referees: Ning Wang (CHN), Hiroyuki Ito (JPN)

15 August 2004; 19:30	Tunisia	0–3	Greece	Peace and Friendship Stadium; Attendance: 8,200; Referees: Valdir Dellaqua (BRA), Fernando Nava (MEX)
15 August 2004; 19:30	(20–25, 14–25, 17–25) result			Peace and Friendship Stadium; Attendance: 8,200; Referees: Valdir Dellaqua (BRA), Fernando Nava (MEX)

17 August 2004; 09:00	Tunisia	2–3	Argentina	Peace and Friendship Stadium; Attendance: 888; Referees: Ibrahim Al-Naama (QAT), Ryszard Dietrich (POL)
17 August 2004; 09:00	(20–25, 25–23, 16–25, 25–22, 10–15) result			Peace and Friendship Stadium; Attendance: 888; Referees: Ibrahim Al-Naama (QAT), Ryszard Dietrich (POL)

17 August 2004; 11:25	France	0–3	Serbia and Montenegro	Peace and Friendship Stadium; Attendance: 1,000; Referees: Frank Leuthaeusser (GER), Bela Hobor (HUN)
17 August 2004; 11:25	(21–25, 28–30, 22–25) result			Peace and Friendship Stadium; Attendance: 1,000; Referees: Frank Leuthaeusser (GER), Bela Hobor (HUN)

17 August 2004; 19:30	Greece	3–1	Poland	Peace and Friendship Stadium; Attendance: 8,600; Referees: Luciano Gaspari (ITA), Jarmo Salonen (FIN)
17 August 2004; 19:30	(21–25, 25–18, 25–21, 25–20) result			Peace and Friendship Stadium; Attendance: 8,600; Referees: Luciano Gaspari (ITA), Jarmo Salonen (FIN)

19 August 2004; 14:00	Poland	0–3	France	Peace and Friendship Stadium; Attendance: 5,230; Referees: Jarmo Salonen (FIN), Luciano Gaspari (ITA)
19 August 2004; 14:00	(15–25, 18–25, 17–25) result			Peace and Friendship Stadium; Attendance: 5,230; Referees: Jarmo Salonen (FIN), Luciano Gaspari (ITA)

19 August 2004; 16:00	Serbia and Montenegro	3–0	Tunisia	Peace and Friendship Stadium; Attendance: 3,430; Referees: Abdullah Al-Khelaifi (KSA), Valdir Dellaqua (BRA)
19 August 2004; 16:00	(25–16, 25–18, 25–21) result			Peace and Friendship Stadium; Attendance: 3,430; Referees: Abdullah Al-Khelaifi (KSA), Valdir Dellaqua (BRA)

19 August 2004; 19:30	Argentina	3–1	Greece	Peace and Friendship Stadium; Attendance: 9,403; Referees: Mahmoud Abdel Magid (EGY), Patricia Salvatore (USA)
19 August 2004; 19:30	(16–25, 25–21, 25–22, 25–22) result			Peace and Friendship Stadium; Attendance: 9,403; Referees: Mahmoud Abdel Magid (EGY), Patricia Salvatore (USA)

21 August 2004; 14:00	Tunisia	1–3	Poland	Peace and Friendship Stadium; Attendance: 4,600; Referees: Patricia Salvatore (USA), Ibrahim Al-Naama (QAT)
21 August 2004; 14:00	(18–25, 25–23, 19–25, 23–25) result			Peace and Friendship Stadium; Attendance: 4,600; Referees: Patricia Salvatore (USA), Ibrahim Al-Naama (QAT)

21 August 2004; 16:10	Argentina	1–3	Serbia and Montenegro	Peace and Friendship Stadium; Attendance: 4,826; Referees: Fernando Nava (MEX), Ning Wang (CHN)
21 August 2004; 16:10	(25–21, 17–25, 21–25, 23–25) result			Peace and Friendship Stadium; Attendance: 4,826; Referees: Fernando Nava (MEX), Ning Wang (CHN)

21 August 2004; 19:30	Greece	3–2	France	Peace and Friendship Stadium; Attendance: 9,360; Referees: Umit Sokullu (TUR), Frank Leuthaeusser (GER)
21 August 2004; 19:30	(25–22, 14–25, 26–24, 23–25, 15–10) result			Peace and Friendship Stadium; Attendance: 9,360; Referees: Umit Sokullu (TUR), Frank Leuthaeusser (GER)

23 August 2004; 09:00	France	3–1	Tunisia	Peace and Friendship Stadium; Attendance: 1,860; Referees: Francisco Medina (CUB), Fernando Nava (MEX)
23 August 2004; 09:00	(25–23, 18–25, 25–19, 25–19) result			Peace and Friendship Stadium; Attendance: 1,860; Referees: Francisco Medina (CUB), Fernando Nava (MEX)

23 August 2004; 16:00	Poland	3–2	Argentina	Peace and Friendship Stadium; Attendance: 6,295; Referees: Kun-Tae Kim (KOR), Hiroyuki Ito (JPN)
23 August 2004; 16:00	(25–19, 25–22, 23–25, 22–25, 20–18) result			Peace and Friendship Stadium; Attendance: 6,295; Referees: Kun-Tae Kim (KOR), Hiroyuki Ito (JPN)

23 August 2004; 19:30	Serbia and Montenegro	3–2	Greece	Peace and Friendship Stadium; Attendance: 9,415; Referees: Luciano Gaspari (ITA), Jarmo Salomen (FIN)
23 August 2004; 19:30	(21–25, 38–36, 25–13, 23–25, 15–12) result			Peace and Friendship Stadium; Attendance: 9,415; Referees: Luciano Gaspari (ITA), Jarmo Salomen (FIN)

=== Pool B ===
Pos	Team	Pld	W	L	Pts	SW	SL	SR	SPW	SPL	SPR	Qualification
1	Brazil	5	4	1	9	13	7	1.857	483	431	1.121	Quarterfinals
2	Italy	5	3	2	8	13	7	1.857	465	434	1.071	Quarterfinals
3	United States	5	3	2	8	11	8	1.375	437	423	1.033	Quarterfinals
4	Russia	5	3	2	8	11	9	1.222	452	430	1.051	Quarterfinals
5	Netherlands	5	2	3	7	7	11	0.636	391	419	0.933	
6	Australia	5	0	5	5	2	15	0.133	331	422	0.784	

Source: FIVB

15 August 2004; 11:00	Netherlands	3–2	Russia	Peace and Friendship Stadium; Attendance: 2,060; Referees: Umit Sokullu (TUR), Dejan Jovanovic (SCG)
15 August 2004; 11:00	(25–23, 19–25, 17–25, 27–25, 18–16) result			Peace and Friendship Stadium; Attendance: 2,060; Referees: Umit Sokullu (TUR), Dejan Jovanovic (SCG)

15 August 2004; 16:00	Brazil	3–1	Australia	Peace and Friendship Stadium; Attendance: 1,853; Referees: Georgios Karampetsos (GRE), Ryszard Dietrich (POL)
15 August 2004; 16:00	(23–25, 25–19, 25–12, 25–21) result			Peace and Friendship Stadium; Attendance: 1,853; Referees: Georgios Karampetsos (GRE), Ryszard Dietrich (POL)

15 August 2004; 21:30	Italy	3–1	United States	Peace and Friendship Stadium; Attendance: 5,630; Referees: Kun-Tae Kim (KOR), Juan Pereyra (ARG)
15 August 2004; 21:30	(25–21, 21–25, 25–17, 25–23) result			Peace and Friendship Stadium; Attendance: 5,630; Referees: Kun-Tae Kim (KOR), Juan Pereyra (ARG)

17 August 2004; 14:00	Australia	0–3	Russia	Peace and Friendship Stadium; Attendance: 2,815; Referees: Fernando Nava (MEX), Mahmoud Abdel Magid (EGY)
17 August 2004; 14:00	(17–25, 24–26, 23–25) result			Peace and Friendship Stadium; Attendance: 2,815; Referees: Fernando Nava (MEX), Mahmoud Abdel Magid (EGY)

17 August 2004; 16:00	United States	3–0	Netherlands	Peace and Friendship Stadium; Attendance: 3,000; Referees: Juan Pereyra (ARG), Abdullah Al-Khelaifi (KSA)
17 August 2004; 16:00	(26–24, 25–20, 25–18) result			Peace and Friendship Stadium; Attendance: 3,000; Referees: Juan Pereyra (ARG), Abdullah Al-Khelaifi (KSA)

17 August 2004; 21:45	Brazil	3–2	Italy	Peace and Friendship Stadium; Attendance: 6,500; Referees: Ning Wang (CHN), Kun-Tae Kim (KOR)
17 August 2004; 21:45	(25–21, 15–25, 25–16, 21–25, 33–31) result			Peace and Friendship Stadium; Attendance: 6,500; Referees: Ning Wang (CHN), Kun-Tae Kim (KOR)

19 August 2004; 09:00	Italy	3–0	Australia	Peace and Friendship Stadium; Attendance: 2,950; Referees: Ibrahim Al-Naama (QAT), Juan Pereyra (ARG)
19 August 2004; 09:00	(25–20, 25–18, 25–21) result			Peace and Friendship Stadium; Attendance: 2,950; Referees: Ibrahim Al-Naama (QAT), Juan Pereyra (ARG)

19 August 2004; 11:00	Netherlands	1–3	Brazil	Peace and Friendship Stadium; Attendance: 4,150; Referees: Fernando Nava (MEX), Francisco Medina (CUB)
19 August 2004; 11:00	(22–25, 26–24, 21–25, 19–25) result			Peace and Friendship Stadium; Attendance: 4,150; Referees: Fernando Nava (MEX), Francisco Medina (CUB)

19 August 2004; 21:45	Russia	3–1	United States	Peace and Friendship Stadium; Attendance: 4,930; Referees: Hiroyuki Ito (JPN), Ning Wang (CHN)
19 August 2004; 21:45	(22–25, 25–20, 25–16, 25–23) result			Peace and Friendship Stadium; Attendance: 4,930; Referees: Hiroyuki Ito (JPN), Ning Wang (CHN)

21 August 2004; 09:00	Australia	1–3	United States	Peace and Friendship Stadium; Attendance: 4,580; Referees: Fotios Lekkas (GRE), Ryszard Dietrich (POL)
21 August 2004; 09:00	(19–25, 25–23, 13–25, 19–25) result			Peace and Friendship Stadium; Attendance: 4,580; Referees: Fotios Lekkas (GRE), Ryszard Dietrich (POL)

21 August 2004; 11:20	Italy	3–0	Netherlands	Peace and Friendship Stadium; Attendance: 6,200; Referees: Patrick Rachard (FRA), Bela Hobor (HUN)
21 August 2004; 11:20	(25–19, 25–21, 25–20) result			Peace and Friendship Stadium; Attendance: 6,200; Referees: Patrick Rachard (FRA), Bela Hobor (HUN)

21 August 2004; 22:20	Brazil	3–0	Russia	Peace and Friendship Stadium; Attendance: 5,400; Referees: Hiroyuki Ito (JPN), Kun-Tae Kim (KOR)
21 August 2004; 22:20	(25–19, 25–13, 25–23) result			Peace and Friendship Stadium; Attendance: 5,400; Referees: Hiroyuki Ito (JPN), Kun-Tae Kim (KOR)

23 August 2004; 11:15	Russia	3–2	Italy	Peace and Friendship Stadium; Attendance: 4,134; Referees: Frank Leuthaeusser (GER), Patrick Rachard (FRA)
23 August 2004; 11:15	(25–16, 25–22, 22–25, 23–25, 15–13) result			Peace and Friendship Stadium; Attendance: 4,134; Referees: Frank Leuthaeusser (GER), Patrick Rachard (FRA)

23 August 2004; 14:00	Netherlands	3–0	Australia	Peace and Friendship Stadium; Attendance: 4,120; Referees: Mahmoud Abdel Magid (EGY), Juan Pereyra (ARG)
23 August 2004; 14:00	(25–22, 25–17, 25–16) result			Peace and Friendship Stadium; Attendance: 4,120; Referees: Mahmoud Abdel Magid (EGY), Juan Pereyra (ARG)

23 August 2004; 22:20	United States	3–1	Brazil	Peace and Friendship Stadium; Attendance: 3,150; Referees: Bela Hobor (HUN), Dejan Jovanovic (SCG)
23 August 2004; 22:20	(25–22, 25–23, 18–25, 25–22) result			Peace and Friendship Stadium; Attendance: 3,150; Referees: Bela Hobor (HUN), Dejan Jovanovic (SCG)

== Final round ==
- All times are Eastern European Summer Time (UTC+03:00).

Quarterfinals
25 August
Serbia and Montenegro	1
Russia	3
25 August
Argentina	1
Italy	3
25 August
Greece	2
United States	3
25 August
Poland	0
Brazil	3

Semifinals
27 August
Russia	0
Italy	3
27 August
United States	0
Brazil	3

Gold medal match
29 August
Italy	1
Brazil	3
Bronze medal match
29 August
Russia	3
United States	0

=== Quarterfinals ===
25 August 2004; 14:00	Serbia and Montenegro	1–3	Russia	Peace and Friendship Stadium; Attendance: 8,850; Referees: Jarmo Salonen (FIN), Frank Leuthaeusser (GER)
25 August 2004; 14:00	(27–29, 25–23, 25–27, 26–28) result			Peace and Friendship Stadium; Attendance: 8,850; Referees: Jarmo Salonen (FIN), Frank Leuthaeusser (GER)

25 August 2004; 16:30	Argentina	1–3	Italy	Peace and Friendship Stadium; Attendance: 8,100; Referees: Hiroyuki Ito (JPN), Ibrahim Al-Naama (QAT)
25 August 2004; 16:30	(25–22, 22–25, 24–26, 26–28) result			Peace and Friendship Stadium; Attendance: 8,100; Referees: Hiroyuki Ito (JPN), Ibrahim Al-Naama (QAT)

25 August 2004; 19:30	Greece	2–3	United States	Peace and Friendship Stadium; Attendance: 9,300; Referees: Kun-Tae Kim (KOR), Juan Pereyra (ARG)
25 August 2004; 19:30	(20–25, 25–22, 27–25, 23–25, 15–17) result			Peace and Friendship Stadium; Attendance: 9,300; Referees: Kun-Tae Kim (KOR), Juan Pereyra (ARG)

25 August 2004; 22:25	Poland	0–3	Brazil	Peace and Friendship Stadium; Attendance: 4,150; Referees: Ning Wang (CHN), Fernando Nava (MEX)
25 August 2004; 22:25	(22–25, 25–27, 18–25) result			Peace and Friendship Stadium; Attendance: 4,150; Referees: Ning Wang (CHN), Fernando Nava (MEX)

=== Semifinals ===
27 August 2004; 19:30	Russia	0–3	Italy	Peace and Friendship Stadium; Attendance: 9,380; Referees: Bela Hobor (HUN), Patrick Rachard (FRA)
27 August 2004; 19:30	(16–25, 17–25, 16–25) result			Peace and Friendship Stadium; Attendance: 9,380; Referees: Bela Hobor (HUN), Patrick Rachard (FRA)

27 August 2004; 21:30	United States	0–3	Brazil	Peace and Friendship Stadium; Attendance: 9,380; Referees: Umit Sokullu (TUR), Ryszard Dietrich (POL)
27 August 2004; 21:30	(16–25, 17–25, 23–25) result			Peace and Friendship Stadium; Attendance: 9,380; Referees: Umit Sokullu (TUR), Ryszard Dietrich (POL)

=== Bronze medal match ===
29 August 2004; 12:30	Russia	3–0	United States	Peace and Friendship Stadium; Attendance: 7,650; Referees: Kun-Tae Kim (KOR), Valdir Dellaqua (BRA)
29 August 2004; 12:30	(25–22, 27–25, 25–16) result			Peace and Friendship Stadium; Attendance: 7,650; Referees: Kun-Tae Kim (KOR), Valdir Dellaqua (BRA)

=== Gold medal match ===
29 August 2004; 14:30	Italy	1–3	Brazil	Peace and Friendship Stadium; Attendance: 9,350; Referees: Hiroyuki Ito (JPN), Ning Wang (CHN)
29 August 2004; 14:30	(15–25, 26–24, 20–25, 22–25) result			Peace and Friendship Stadium; Attendance: 9,350; Referees: Hiroyuki Ito (JPN), Ning Wang (CHN)

== Final standing ==
Rank	Team
1st place, gold medalist(s)	Brazil
2nd place, silver medalist(s)	Italy
3rd place, bronze medalist(s)	Russia
4	United States
5	Argentina
5	Greece
5	Poland
5	Serbia and Montenegro
9	France
9	Netherlands
11	Australia
11	Tunisia

2004 Men's Olympic champions

Brazil
2nd title

12–man roster
Giovane, André Heller, Maurício, Giba, André, Sérgio (L), Anderson, Nalbert (c), Gustavo, Rodrigão, Ricardinho, Dante
Head coach
Bernardinho

== Medalists ==
Gold	Silver	Bronze
Brazil Giovane Gávio; André Heller; Maurício Lima; Gilberto Godoy Filho; André Nascimento; Sérgio Santos (L); Anderson Rodrigues; Nalbert Bitencourt (c); Gustavo Endres; Rodrigo Santana; Ricardo Garcia; Dante Amaral Head coach: Bernardinho	Italy Luigi Mastrangelo; Valerio Vermiglio; Samuele Papi; Andrea Sartoretti; Alberto Cisolla; Ventzislav Simeonov; Damiano Pippi (L); Andrea Giani (c); Alessandro Fei; Paolo Tofoli; Paolo Cozzi; Matej Černič Head coach: Gian Paolo Montali	Russia Stanislav Dineykin; Sergei Baranov; Pavel Abramov; Aleksey Kazakov; Sergey Tetyukhin; Vadim Khamuttskikh (c); Aleksandr Kosarev; Konstantin Ushakov; Taras Khtey; Andrey Egorchev; Aleksey Verbov (L); Aleksey Kuleshov Head coach: Gennady Shipulin

== Awards ==
- Most valuable player
  (Brazil) Gilberto Godoy Filho
- Best scorer
  (Italy) Andrea Sartoretti
- Best spiker
  (Brazil) Dante Amaral
- Best blocker
  (Russia) Aleksey Kuleshov
- Best server
  (Italy) Andrea Sartoretti
- Best digger
  (Brazil) Sérgio Santos
- Best setter
  (Brazil) Ricardo Garcia
- Best receiver
  (Brazil) Sérgio Santos
- Best libero
  (Brazil) Sérgio Santos

== See also ==
- Volleyball at the Summer Olympics
- Volleyball at the 2004 Summer Olympics – Women's tournament
- Beach volleyball at the 2004 Summer Olympics – Men's tournament
- Sitting volleyball at the 2004 Summer Paralympics – Men's tournament
