= Nicco (surname) =

Nicco is an Italian surname. Notable people with the surname include:

- Roberto Nicco, politician with Autonomy Liberty Participation Ecology
- Gianluca Nicco, Italian footballer

== See also ==
- Nicco (disambiguation)
