= 2003 Asian Men's Volleyball Championship =

International volleyball tournament

Tournament details
- Host country: China
- City: Tianjin
- Dates: 5–12 September
- Teams: 15
- Venues: 2 (in 1 host city)

Final positions
- Champions: South Korea (4th title)
- Runners-up: China
- Third place: Iran
- Fourth place: Australia

Tournament awards
- MVP: (India) Yejju Subba Rao

The Asian Men's Volleyball Championship was the twelfth staging of the Asian Men's Volleyball Championship, a biennial international volleyball tournament organised by the Asian Volleyball Confederation (AVC) with Chinese Volleyball Association (CVA). The tournament was held in Tianjin, China from 5 to 12 September 2003.

== Pools composition ==
The teams are seeded based on their final ranking at the 2001 Asian Men's Volleyball Championship.

| Pool A | Pool B | Pool C | Pool D |
|---|---|---|---|
| China (Host & 4th) Saudi Arabia (8th); Kazakhstan | South Korea (1st); India (7th); Bahrain; Thailand | Australia (2nd); Chinese Taipei (6th); United Arab Emirates; Pakistan | Japan (3rd); Iran (5th); Qatar; New Zealand |

== Preliminary round ==
=== Pool A ===
| Pos | Team | Pld | W | L | Pts | SW | SL | SR | SPW | SPL | SPR | Qualification |
|---|---|---|---|---|---|---|---|---|---|---|---|---|
| 1 | China | 2 | 2 | 0 | 4 | 6 | 0 | MAX | 151 | 108 | 1.398 | Pool E or Pool F |
| 2 | Kazakhstan | 2 | 1 | 1 | 3 | 3 | 4 | 0.750 | 0 | 0 | — | Pool E or Pool F |
| 3 | Saudi Arabia | 2 | 0 | 2 | 2 | 1 | 6 | 0.167 | 0 | 0 | — | Pool G |

| Date | | Score | | Set 1 | Set 2 | Set 3 | Set 4 | Set 5 | Total |
|---|---|---|---|---|---|---|---|---|---|
| 05 Sep | China | 3–0 | Kazakhstan | 26–24 | 25–14 | 25–20 | | | 76–58 |
| 06 Sep | China | 3–0 | Saudi Arabia | 25–18 | 25–17 | 25–15 | | | 75–50 |
| 07 Sep | Kazakhstan | 3–1 | Saudi Arabia | | | | | | |

=== Pool B ===
| Pos | Team | Pld | W | L | Pts | SW | SL | SR | SPW | SPL | SPR | Qualification |
|---|---|---|---|---|---|---|---|---|---|---|---|---|
| 1 | India | 3 | 3 | 0 | 6 | 9 | 4 | 2.250 | 302 | 268 | 1.127 | Pool E or Pool F |
| 2 | South Korea | 3 | 2 | 1 | 5 | 8 | 3 | 2.667 | 259 | 203 | 1.276 | Pool E or Pool F |
| 3 | Thailand | 3 | 1 | 2 | 4 | 4 | 7 | 0.571 | 231 | 250 | 0.924 | Pool G or Pool H |
| 4 | Bahrain | 3 | 0 | 3 | 3 | 2 | 9 | 0.222 | 202 | 273 | 0.740 | Pool G or Pool H |

| Date | | Score | | Set 1 | Set 2 | Set 3 | Set 4 | Set 5 | Total |
|---|---|---|---|---|---|---|---|---|---|
| 05 Sep | Bahrain | 1–3 | Thailand | 28–26 | 12–25 | 17–25 | 21–25 | | 78–101 |
| 05 Sep | South Korea | 2–3 | India | 25–23 | 22–25 | 25–20 | 22–25 | 15–17 | 109–110 |
| 06 Sep | South Korea | 3–0 | Thailand | 25–17 | 25–17 | 25–17 | | | 75–51 |
| 06 Sep | India | 3–1 | Bahrain | 22–25 | 25–16 | 25–23 | 25–16 | | 97–80 |
| 07 Sep | South Korea | 3–0 | Bahrain | 25–12 | 25–16 | 25–16 | | | 75–44 |
| 07 Sep | Thailand | 1–3 | India | 19–25 | 18–25 | 25–22 | 17–25 | | 79–97 |

=== Pool C ===
| Pos | Team | Pld | W | L | Pts | SW | SL | SR | SPW | SPL | SPR | Qualification |
|---|---|---|---|---|---|---|---|---|---|---|---|---|
| 1 | Australia | 3 | 3 | 0 | 6 | 9 | 4 | 2.250 | 284 | 266 | 1.068 | Pool E or Pool F |
| 2 | Pakistan | 3 | 2 | 1 | 5 | 8 | 5 | 1.600 | 0 | 0 | — | Pool E or Pool F |
| 3 | Chinese Taipei | 3 | 1 | 2 | 4 | 7 | 6 | 1.167 | 0 | 0 | — | Pool G or Pool H |
| 4 | United Arab Emirates | 3 | 0 | 3 | 3 | 0 | 9 | 0.000 | 0 | 0 | — | Pool G or Pool H |

| Date | | Score | | Set 1 | Set 2 | Set 3 | Set 4 | Set 5 | Total |
|---|---|---|---|---|---|---|---|---|---|
| 05 Sep | United Arab Emirates | 0–3 | Chinese Taipei | | | | | | |
| 05 Sep | Australia | 3–2 | Pakistan | 17–25 | 22–25 | 25–17 | 25–17 | 15–12 | 104–96 |
| 06 Sep | United Arab Emirates | 0–3 | Australia | 21–25 | 19–25 | 22–25 | | | 62–75 |
| 06 Sep | Chinese Taipei | 2–3 | Pakistan | 26–28 | 25–19 | 25–16 | 22–25 | 12–15 | 110–103 |
| 07 Sep | Australia | 3–2 | Chinese Taipei | 15–25 | 25–19 | 19–25 | 31–29 | 15–10 | 105–108 |
| 07 Sep | Pakistan | 3–0 | United Arab Emirates | | | | | | |

=== Pool D ===
| Pos | Team | Pld | W | L | Pts | SW | SL | SR | SPW | SPL | SPR | Qualification |
|---|---|---|---|---|---|---|---|---|---|---|---|---|
| 1 | Iran | 3 | 3 | 0 | 6 | 9 | 2 | 4.500 | 270 | 214 | 1.262 | Pool E or Pool F |
| 2 | Japan | 3 | 2 | 1 | 5 | 7 | 3 | 2.333 | 231 | 207 | 1.116 | Pool E or Pool F |
| 3 | Qatar | 3 | 1 | 2 | 4 | 3 | 8 | 0.375 | 226 | 252 | 0.897 | Pool G or Pool H |
| 4 | New Zealand | 3 | 0 | 3 | 3 | 3 | 9 | 0.333 | 226 | 280 | 0.807 | Pool G or Pool H |

| Date | | Score | | Set 1 | Set 2 | Set 3 | Set 4 | Set 5 | Total |
|---|---|---|---|---|---|---|---|---|---|
| 05 Sep | Iran | 3–0 | Qatar | 25–19 | 25–17 | 25–20 | | | 75–56 |
| 05 Sep | Japan | 3–0 | New Zealand | 25–16 | 25–15 | 25–16 | | | 75–47 |
| 06 Sep | Qatar | 3–2 | New Zealand | 25–20 | 22–25 | 25–21 | 21–25 | 15–11 | 108–102 |
| 06 Sep | Japan | 1–3 | Iran | 15–25 | 20–25 | 25–23 | 21–25 | | 81–98 |
| 07 Sep | New Zealand | 1–3 | Iran | 21–25 | 25–22 | 18–25 | 13–25 | | 77–97 |
| 07 Sep | Japan | 3–0 | Qatar | 25–22 | 25–23 | 25–17 | | | 75–62 |

== Quarterfinals ==
- The results and the points of the matches between the same teams that were already played during the preliminary round shall be taken into account for the Quarterfinals.

=== Pool E ===
| Pos | Team | Pld | W | L | Pts | SW | SL | SR | SPW | SPL | SPR | Qualification |
|---|---|---|---|---|---|---|---|---|---|---|---|---|
| 1 | China | 3 | 3 | 0 | 6 | 9 | 0 | MAX | 230 | 175 | 1.314 | Championship round |
| 2 | Australia | 3 | 2 | 1 | 5 | 6 | 7 | 0.857 | 266 | 268 | 0.993 | Championship round |
| 3 | Pakistan | 3 | 1 | 2 | 4 | 5 | 6 | 0.833 | 231 | 242 | 0.955 | 5th–8th classification |
| 4 | Kazakhstan | 3 | 0 | 3 | 3 | 2 | 9 | 0.222 | 214 | 256 | 0.836 | 5th–8th classification |

| Date | | Score | | Set 1 | Set 2 | Set 3 | Set 4 | Set 5 | Total |
|---|---|---|---|---|---|---|---|---|---|
| 08 Sep | Australia | 3–2 | Kazakhstan | 19–25 | 25–16 | 21–25 | 25–21 | 15–10 | 105–97 |
| 08 Sep | China | 3–0 | Pakistan | 25–16 | 29–27 | 25–17 | | | 79–60 |
| 09 Sep | Pakistan | 3–0 | Kazakhstan | 25–17 | 25–19 | 25–23 | | | 75–59 |
| 09 Sep | China | 3–0 | Australia | 25–23 | 25–17 | 25–17 | | | 75–57 |

=== Pool F ===
| Pos | Team | Pld | W | L | Pts | SW | SL | SR | SPW | SPL | SPR | Qualification |
|---|---|---|---|---|---|---|---|---|---|---|---|---|
| 1 | South Korea | 3 | 2 | 1 | 5 | 8 | 4 | 2.000 | 305 | 279 | 1.093 | Championship round |
| 2 | Iran | 3 | 2 | 1 | 5 | 6 | 6 | 1.000 | 273 | 277 | 0.986 | Championship round |
| 3 | India | 3 | 1 | 2 | 4 | 6 | 8 | 0.750 | 308 | 314 | 0.981 | 5th–8th classification |
| 4 | Japan | 3 | 1 | 2 | 4 | 5 | 7 | 0.714 | 280 | 296 | 0.946 | 5th–8th classification |

| Date | | Score | | Set 1 | Set 2 | Set 3 | Set 4 | Set 5 | Total |
|---|---|---|---|---|---|---|---|---|---|
| 08 Sep | India | 1–3 | Japan | 22–25 | 21–25 | 25–23 | 21–25 | | 89–98 |
| 08 Sep | Iran | 0–3 | South Korea | 15–25 | 18–25 | 35–37 | | | 68–87 |
| 09 Sep | South Korea | 3–1 | Japan | 25–23 | 25–19 | 33–35 | 26–24 | | 109–101 |
| 09 Sep | Iran | 3–2 | India | 25–23 | 20–25 | 22–25 | 25–23 | 15–13 | 107–109 |

=== Pool G ===
| Pos | Team | Pld | W | L | Pts | SW | SL | SR | SPW | SPL | SPR | Qualification |
|---|---|---|---|---|---|---|---|---|---|---|---|---|
| 1 | Chinese Taipei | 2 | 2 | 0 | 4 | 6 | 1 | 6.000 | 0 | 0 | — | 9th–12th classification |
| 2 | Saudi Arabia | 2 | 1 | 1 | 3 | 4 | 4 | 1.000 | 180 | 174 | 1.034 | 9th–12th classification |
| 3 | United Arab Emirates | 2 | 0 | 2 | 2 | 1 | 6 | 0.167 | 0 | 0 | — | 13th–15th classification |

| Date | | Score | | Set 1 | Set 2 | Set 3 | Set 4 | Set 5 | Total |
|---|---|---|---|---|---|---|---|---|---|
| 08 Sep | Saudi Arabia | 3–1 | United Arab Emirates | 25–21 | 25–19 | 22–25 | 25–12 | | 97–77 |
| 09 Sep | Saudi Arabia | 1–3 | Chinese Taipei | 23–25 | 25–22 | 21–25 | 14–25 | | 83–97 |

=== Pool H ===
| Pos | Team | Pld | W | L | Pts | SW | SL | SR | SPW | SPL | SPR | Qualification |
|---|---|---|---|---|---|---|---|---|---|---|---|---|
| 1 | Thailand | 3 | 3 | 0 | 6 | 9 | 3 | 3.000 | 281 | 214 | 1.313 | 9th–12th classification |
| 2 | Qatar | 3 | 2 | 1 | 5 | 8 | 6 | 1.333 | 301 | 300 | 1.003 | 9th–12th classification |
| 3 | Bahrain | 3 | 1 | 2 | 4 | 5 | 6 | 0.833 | 246 | 260 | 0.946 | 13th–15th classification |
| 4 | New Zealand | 3 | 0 | 3 | 3 | 2 | 9 | 0.222 | 204 | 258 | 0.791 | 13th–15th classification |

| Date | | Score | | Set 1 | Set 2 | Set 3 | Set 4 | Set 5 | Total |
|---|---|---|---|---|---|---|---|---|---|
| 08 Sep | Thailand | 3–0 | New Zealand | 25–13 | 25–12 | 25–16 | | | 75–41 |
| 08 Sep | Qatar | 3–1 | Bahrain | 22–25 | 25–21 | 25–23 | 26–24 | | 98–93 |
| 09 Sep | Bahrain | 3–0 | New Zealand | 25–23 | 25–17 | 25–21 | | | 75–61 |
| 09 Sep | Thailand | 3–2 | Qatar | 17–25 | 25–15 | 23–25 | 25–20 | 15–10 | 105–95 |

== Final round ==
- The results and the points of the matches between the same teams that were already played during the previous rounds shall be taken into account for the final round.

=== Classification 13th–15th ===
| Pos | Team | Pld | W | L | Pts | SW | SL | SR | SPW | SPL | SPR |
|---|---|---|---|---|---|---|---|---|---|---|---|
| 13 | Bahrain | 2 | 2 | 0 | 4 | 6 | 0 | MAX | 154 | 129 | 1.194 |
| 14 | New Zealand | 2 | 1 | 1 | 3 | 3 | 4 | 0.750 | 157 | 166 | 0.946 |
| 15 | United Arab Emirates | 2 | 0 | 2 | 2 | 1 | 6 | 0.167 | 159 | 175 | 0.909 |

| Date | | Score | | Set 1 | Set 2 | Set 3 | Set 4 | Set 5 | Total |
|---|---|---|---|---|---|---|---|---|---|
| 11 Sep | United Arab Emirates | 1–3 | New Zealand | 25–14 | 18–25 | 18–25 | 30–32 | | 91–96 |
| 12 Sep | Bahrain | 3–0 | United Arab Emirates | 25–18 | 29–27 | 25–23 | | | 79–68 |

=== Classification 9th–12th ===
| Pos | Team | Pld | W | L | Pts | SW | SL | SR | SPW | SPL | SPR |
|---|---|---|---|---|---|---|---|---|---|---|---|
| 9 | Chinese Taipei | 3 | 3 | 0 | 6 | 9 | 1 | 9.000 | 247 | 196 | 1.260 |
| 10 | Thailand | 3 | 2 | 1 | 5 | 6 | 6 | 1.000 | 262 | 252 | 1.040 |
| 11 | Qatar | 3 | 1 | 2 | 4 | 5 | 6 | 0.833 | 228 | 252 | 0.905 |
| 12 | Saudi Arabia | 3 | 0 | 3 | 3 | 2 | 9 | 0.222 | 237 | 274 | 0.865 |

| Date | | Score | | Set 1 | Set 2 | Set 3 | Set 4 | Set 5 | Total |
|---|---|---|---|---|---|---|---|---|---|
| 11 Sep | Chinese Taipei | 3–0 | Qatar | 25–17 | 25–17 | 25–20 | | | 75–54 |
| 11 Sep | Thailand | 3–1 | Saudi Arabia | 25–19 | 25–18 | 23–25 | 25–20 | | 98–82 |
| 12 Sep | Qatar | 3–0 | Saudi Arabia | 25–22 | 28–26 | 26–24 | | | 79–72 |
| 12 Sep | Thailand | 0–3 | Chinese Taipei | 19–25 | 22–25 | 18–25 | | | 59–75 |

=== Classification 5th–8th ===
| Pos | Team | Pld | W | L | Pts | SW | SL | SR | SPW | SPL | SPR |
|---|---|---|---|---|---|---|---|---|---|---|---|
| 5 | India | 3 | 2 | 1 | 5 | 7 | 3 | 2.333 | 241 | 220 | 1.095 |
| 6 | Japan | 3 | 2 | 1 | 5 | 7 | 4 | 1.750 | 261 | 235 | 1.111 |
| 7 | Pakistan | 3 | 2 | 1 | 5 | 6 | 4 | 1.500 | 223 | 222 | 1.005 |
| 8 | Kazakhstan | 3 | 0 | 3 | 3 | 0 | 9 | 0.000 | 179 | 227 | 0.789 |

| Date | | Score | | Set 1 | Set 2 | Set 3 | Set 4 | Set 5 | Total |
|---|---|---|---|---|---|---|---|---|---|
| 11 Sep | India | 3–0 | Kazakhstan | 27–25 | 25–21 | 25–17 | | | 77–63 |
| 11 Sep | Pakistan | 3–1 | Japan | 25–22 | 14–25 | 25–19 | 25–22 | | 89–88 |
| 12 Sep | Japan | 3–0 | Kazakhstan | 25–18 | 25–22 | 25–17 | | | 75–57 |
| 12 Sep | Pakistan | 0–3 | India | 22–25 | 20–25 | 17–25 | | | 59–75 |

=== Championship ===
| Pos | Team | Pld | W | L | Pts | SW | SL | SR | SPW | SPL | SPR |
|---|---|---|---|---|---|---|---|---|---|---|---|
| 1 | South Korea | 3 | 3 | 0 | 6 | 9 | 3 | 3.000 | 288 | 257 | 1.121 |
| 2 | China | 3 | 2 | 1 | 5 | 8 | 4 | 2.000 | 273 | 242 | 1.128 |
| 3 | Iran | 3 | 1 | 2 | 4 | 4 | 8 | 0.500 | 250 | 282 | 0.887 |
| 4 | Australia | 3 | 0 | 3 | 3 | 3 | 9 | 0.333 | 243 | 273 | 0.890 |

| Date | | Score | | Set 1 | Set 2 | Set 3 | Set 4 | Set 5 | Total |
|---|---|---|---|---|---|---|---|---|---|
| 11 Sep | South Korea | 3–1 | Australia | 16–25 | 25–19 | 25–19 | 25–22 | | 91–85 |
| 11 Sep | China | 3–1 | Iran | 25–18 | 25–16 | 19–25 | 25–16 | | 94–75 |
| 12 Sep | Iran | 3–2 | Australia | 25–21 | 25–18 | 21–25 | 21–25 | 15–12 | 107–101 |
| 12 Sep | South Korea | 3–2 | China | 27–25 | 22–25 | 21–25 | 25–21 | 15–8 | 110–104 |

== Final standing ==
| Rank | Team |
|---|---|
| 1st place, gold medalist(s) | South Korea |
| 2nd place, silver medalist(s) | China |
| 3rd place, bronze medalist(s) | Iran |
| 4 | Australia |
| 5 | India |
| 6 | Japan |
| 7 | Pakistan |
| 8 | Kazakhstan |
| 9 | Chinese Taipei |
| 10 | Thailand |
| 11 | Qatar |
| 12 | Saudi Arabia |
| 13 | Bahrain |
| 14 | New Zealand |
| 15 | United Arab Emirates |

| Qualified for the 2003 World Cup and 2004 Olympic Qualifier |
| Qualified for the 2004 Olympic Qualifier |
| Already qualified as hosts for the 2003 World Cup and 2004 Olympic Qualifier |

2003 Asian Men's champions

South Korea
4th title

== Awards ==
- MVP: (India) Yejju Subba Rao
- Best scorer: (Australia) Dan Howard
- Best spiker: (India) Yejju Subba Rao
- Best blocker: (India) Yejju Subba Rao
- Best server: (China) Zheng Liang
- Best setter: (China) Wang Hebing
- Best digger: (South Korea) Yeo Oh-hyun
- Best receiver: (South Korea) Suk Jin-wook
