= Nico Freriks =

Dutch volleyball player (born 1981)

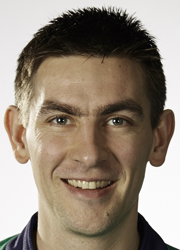

Nico Petrus Johannes Freriks (born 22 December 1981 in Uden, North Brabant) is a former volleyball player from the Netherlands, who represented his native country at the 2004 Summer Olympics in Athens, Greece. There he ended up in ninth place with the Dutch Men's National Team. Freriks was named Best Setter at the 2004 Men's Volleyball Olympic Qualifier in Madrid, Spain.

== Club ==
- Hovoc Horst 1993-1998 (Junior)
- Facopa Weert 1998-1999 (Junior)
- SSS Barneveld 1999-2001
- Noliko Maaseik 2001-2003
- Omniworld Almere 2003-2005
- Hypo Tyrol Innsbruck 2005-2006
- Knack Randstad Roeselare 2006-2008
- Jastrzębski Węgiel 2008-2009
- Nesselande Rotterdam 2009-2010
- Unicaja Almeria 2010-2011
- Knack Roeselare 2011-2012
- Lokomotiv Belogorie 2012-2012
- Moerser SC 2012-2013
- Bre Banca Lannutti Cuneo 2013-2013
- Beauvais Oise 2013-2014
- Kalleh Mazandaran 2014-2014
- Paykan Tehran 2014-2015
- Kalleh 2015-2015
- Hovoc Horst 2016-2017
