= List of Soy Luna characters =

Soy Luna is an Argentine-Mexican drama television series developed by Disney Channel Latin America. The series premiered on 14 March 2016 in Latin America on Disney Channel, and is currently in its third season. The phrase "Soy Luna" directly translates to "I'm Luna".

== Character appearances ==
Legend
= Main cast (credited)
= Recurring cast (2+)
= Guest cast (1)

Character	Portrayed by	Seasons						
Character	Portrayed by	Season 1		Season 2		Season 3		Season 4
Character	Portrayed by	Part 1	Part 2	Part 1	Part 2	Part 1	Part 2	Season 4
Luna Valente / Sol Benson	Karol Sevilla	Main	Main	Main	Main	Main	Main	Main
Matteo Balsano	Ruggero Pasquarelli	Main	Main	Main	Main	Main	Main	Main
Ámbar Smith	Valentina Zenere	Main	Main	Main	Main	Main	Main	
Simón Álvarez	Michael Ronda	Main	Main	Main	Main	Main	Main	Main
Delfina "Delfi" Alzamendi	Malena Ratner	Main	Main	Main	Main	Main	Main	Main
Gastón Perida	Agustín Bernasconi	Main (Note: Agustín Bernasconi is still credited as a series regular throughout the third season.)	Main	Main	Main	Main	Main	Main
Jazmín Carbajal	Katja Martínez	Main	Main	Main	Main	Main	Main	
Jimena "Jim" Medina	Ana Jara	Main	Main	Main	Main	Main	Main	
Ramiro Ponce	Jorge López	Main	Main	Main	Main	Main	Main	
Yamila "Yam" Sánchez	Chiara Parravicini	Main	Main	Main	Main	Main	Main	
Pedro Arias	Gastón Vietto	Main	Main	Main	Main	Main	Main	Main
Nicolás "Nico" Navarro	Lionel Ferro	Main (Note: Lionel Ferro is still credited as a series regular throughout the third season.)	Main	Main	Main	Main	Main	
Nina Simonetti	Carolina Kopelioff	Main	Main	Main	Main	Main	Main	Main
Tamara Ríos	Luz Cipriota	Main	Main	Guest (Note: Luz Cipriota is not credited in the second season.)				
Sharon Benson	Lucila Gandolfo	Main	Main	Main	Main	Main	Main	Main
Reinaldo "Rey" Gutiérrez	Rodrigo Pedreira	Main	Main	Main	Main	Main	Main	
Miguel Valente	David Murí	Main	Main	Main	Main	Main	Main	Main
Mónica Valente	Ana Carolina Valsagna	Main	Main	Main	Main	Main	Main	Main
Martín "Tino" Alcaraz	Diego Alcalá	Main (Note: Credited as Diego Sassi Alcalá.)	Main	Main	Main			
Catolino "Cato" Alcoba	Germán Tripel	Main	Main	Main	Main			
Amanda	Antonella Querzoli	Main	Main	Main	Main			
Mora Barza	Paula Kohan	Main	Main	Main	Main	Recurring		
Ricardo Simonetti	Ezequiel Rodríguez	Main (Note: Ezequiel Rodríguez is still credited as a series regular throughout the third season.)	Main	Main	Main	Main	Main	
Ana Valparaíso	Caro Ibarra	Main	Main	Main	Main	Main	Main	
Juliana / Marisa Mint	Estela Ribeiro			Main	Main	Main	Main	
Alfredo Bilder	Roberto Carnaghi			Main	Main	Main	Main	Main
Eric Andrade	Jandino					Main	Main	Main
Emilia Mansfield	Giovanna Reynaud				Recurring	Main	Main	
Benicio	Pasquale Di Nuzzo				Recurring	Main (Note: Credited as Lino Di Nuzzo in season three.)	Main	
Maggie García Centurión	Victoria Suárez Battán					Main	Main	
Gary López	Joaquín Berthold				Recurring	Main (Note: Joaquín Berthold is still credited as a series regular throughout the third season.)	Main	
Salomé	Blanca Palacio							Main
Lola	Dolores Moriondo							Main
Valeria	Maga Altamirano							Main
Beltrán	Thomas Lepera							Main

== Main characters ==
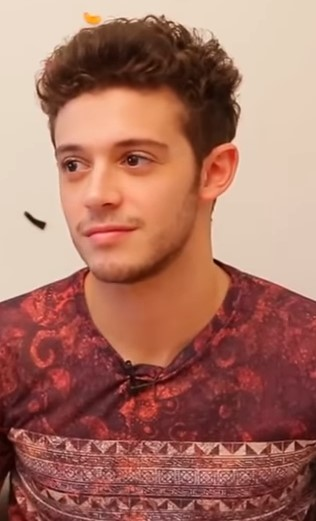
Ruggero Pasquarelli

Part of main cast of the show.

=== Luna Valente ===
Portrayed by Karol Sevilla, Luna Valente (born Sol Benson) is the titular character, she is a sweet and kind girl from Mexico. Luna loves her family and friends. With talent and determination, Luna can do anything she puts to her mind. She is the daughter of Lili Benson and Bernie Benson, but was adopted by Monica Valente and Miguel Valente.

=== Matteo Balsano ===
Portrayed by Ruggero Pasquarelli, Matteo Balsano is one of the main characters. Matteo is a very presumptuous and superficial boy. He is a very good skater, reason why they give him the nickname "El Rey de la Pista". When he meets Luna Valente he falls madly in love with her and looks for how to always approach her. Matteo is very intelligent and uses his intelligence to help Luna with her problems. Many times he behaves like a superficial boy, but inside he has a good heart.

=== Ámbar Smith ===
Portrayed by Valentina Zenere, Ámbar Smith is one of the main characters and the main antagonist of the show. She is superficial and capricious, but also very intelligent. Ámbar is the type of girl that catches everyone's attention and is very popular. She will do anything to get what she wants and with that she will uses her ability to manipulate people to her liking. Despite all this, although she does not want to admit it, she is jealous of Luna's relationship with her parents, because her mother gave her up for adoption when she was young because she couldn't take care of her, and her adopted mother pretends she's her godmother (then niece) to maintain her fortune.

=== Simón Álvarez ===
Portrayed by Michael Ronda, Simón Álvarez he is one of the main characters. Simón is a guy who loves to skate and play guitar, he used to work at Foodger Wheels, a fast food restaurant with his best friend Luna, but when Luna's parents decide to leave Cancun, Mexico. Because they are hired to work at the Benson Mansion in Buenos Aires, Argentina, he says goodbye to Luna. But then he decides to go to Buenos Aires where he will become a member of La Roller Band, formed by Nicolás and Pedro, form a rivalry with Matteo Balsano, and enroll in the Skating Competition at the Jam and Roller.

=== Delfina "Delfi" Alzamendi ===
Portrayed by Malena Rather, Delfina Alzamendi she is one of the main characters. She is one of the best friends of Ámbar Smith and Jazmín Carvajal, like Jazmín, she is the owner, creator and editor of the Fab And Chic website. Like her friends, she is superficial and capable of doing whatever she wants in order to achieve what she plans. Delfina or "Delfi" in spite of beginning to be a totally capricious girl, prejudiced and often petty, she actually has a nice personality in the background that is overshadowed by her loyalty to Ámbar that does not let her make her own decisions. Change attitude by the advice of Pedro becoming a determined, sensible, capable cute baby sweet girl.

=== Gastón Perida ===
Portrayed by Agustín Bernasconi, Gastón Perida he is one of the main characters. Gastón is nice, but also very safe. He respects everyone, but sometimes he gets upset and gets angry. His main interests are skating and music. He loves books, especially science fiction books. Despite being one of the most popular is good vibes. He is Matteo's best friend.

=== Jazmín Carbajal ===
Portrayed by Katja Martínez, Jazmín Carbajal she is one of the main characters. Jazmín is very different from her friends, Amber and Delphine. Jazmín has no filters and will tell you her opinion, whether she wants to or not. She is very naive and ignorant of what is happening around her. She follows all of Ámbar's plans blindly. Jazmín lives outside social networks and craves the opinion of others. It is very aware of fashion and follows all trends therefore it is very unoriginal and at the same time silly.

=== Jimena "Jim" Medina ===
Portrayed by Ana Jara, Jimena Medina is one of the main characters. Jim is a friendly, sweet girl, with many ideas, impulsive and creative. She loves to sing and skate but her first passion is to choreograph routines. She and her best friend Yam are inseparable.

=== Ramiro Ponce ===
Portrayed by Jorge López, Ramiro Ponce is one of the main characters. Ramiro is an arrogant and proud boy who loves to dance and skate. He wants to do everything right, and when he can not, he gets frustrated. He can not admit his mistakes, and he tries to blame others for it, but nevertheless he sometimes shows that he has a big heart in front of others. In the eyes of other people it can be seen as arrogant and unfriendly. Ramiro dreams of being a star, and works hard, hoping that one day his dream will come true.

=== Yamila "Yam" Sánchez ===
Portrayed by Chiara Parravicini, Yamila Sánchez is one of the main characters. Yam is a 16-year-old girl who studies at Blake South College and usually goes to Jam & Roller. She competed with Ramiro in a skating competition and participated several times in the Open Music with her best friend Jim.

=== Pedro Arias ===
Portrayed by Gastón Vietto, Pedro Arias is one of the main characters. Pedro is an employee of the Jam and Roller. He was secretly in love with Tamara and is currently in love with Delfina. His best friends are Nico and Simón.

=== Nicolás "Nico" Navarro ===
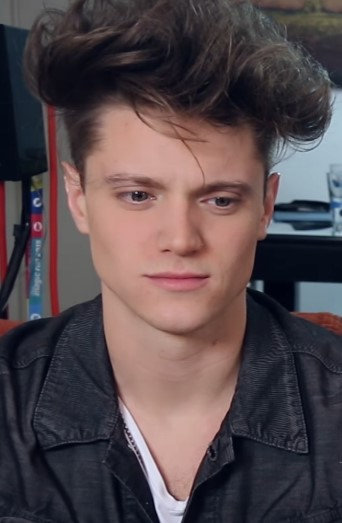
Lionel Ferro stars as Nicolás Navarro

Portrayed by Lionel Ferro, Nicolás Navarro or Nico is one of the main characters. Nicolás is the warm, buyer and friendly guy, with whom everyone quickly becomes attached. He is in charge of the skates in the Jam & Roller. Nico is Pedro's best friend, who also works on the skating rink. Together, they dream of forming a band and, little by little, they will get it.

=== Nina Simonetti ===
Portrayed by Carolina Kopelioff, Nina Simonetti is one of the main characters. Nina is a very curious and intelligent girl, but also very reserved, shy, and unsure of herself due to her experiences with her parents' divorce. At the start of the show she doesn't know how to skate and has few friends. She meets Luna Valente and they became best friends. Luna starts to crack her out of her shell. Nina is in love with Gastón Perida, but doesn't think he will ever notice her. Despite her shyness, she starts showing her true self through her Felicity For Now account, where she writes inspirational quotes.

=== Tamara Ríos ===
Portrayed by Luz Cipriota, Tamara Ríos is one of the main characters in season one. Tamara is in charge of the Jam & Roller. She is very organized and responsible.

=== Sharon Benson ===
Portrayed by Lucila Gandolfo, Sharon Benson is one of the main characters. She is a rich, sophisticated, and intelligent businesswoman. She is Ámbar's adoptive mother and the maternal aunt of Luna.

=== Reinaldo "Rey" Guitiérrez ===
Portrayed by Rodrigo Pedreira, Reinaldo Guitiérrez or Rey is one of the main characters. He is a hardworking man and the personal assistant of Mrs. Sharon Benson. Most of the time, he uses a serious personality, especially with the employees of the mansion.

=== Miguel Valente ===
Portrayed by David Murí, Miguel Valente is one of the main characters. Miguel is a kind and hardworking person. He always cares a lot about his wife, Mónica, and his daughter, Luna. He only wants the best for Luna and he is always by her side whenever she needs it. He is also very focused on his work at the Benson Mansion, and does what he is asked to do. He is also very honest and generous towards his family.

== Recurring characters ==
=== Mariano ===
Portrayed by Tomás de las Herás, Mariano he is Tamara's ex-boyfriend. He brings many problems to the boys, distracting them in the rehearsals for the Intercontinental competition and creating rivalry between them. He is a mysterious man and has bad intentions. He tries to get Jim and Ramiro to leave the team and as well as Luna, but he does not succeed. In the end he trains another team and loses the Intercontinental skating.

== Guest stars ==
=== Introduced in season one ===
- Santiago Stieben as Arcade
- Dani Martins as himself
- Mirta Wons as Olga
- Leo Trento as Willy Star
- Sofia Carson as herself
- Sebastian Villalobos as himself
- Sol Moreno as Daniela

=== Introduced in season two ===
- Sabrina Carpenter as herself
- Martina Stoessel as herself
- Camila Fernández as herself

=== Introduced in season three ===
- Sofia Carson as herself
- Dove Cameron as herself
- Juan Ciancio as Sebastián "Seba" López
- Ian Lucas as himself
