= Nico Gunzelmann =

German politician (born 2002)

Member of the Landtag of Baden-Württemberg
- Incumbent
- Assumed office 11 May 2026
- Constituency: Enz

Personal details
- Born: 26 December 2002 (age 23)
- Party: Christian Democratic Union

Nico Gunzelmann (born 26 December 2002) is a German politician who was elected member of the Landtag of Baden-Württemberg in 2026. He has served as chairman of the Young Union in Pforzheim–Enzkreis since 2024.
