= Carlos Souto =

Argentine advertising executive

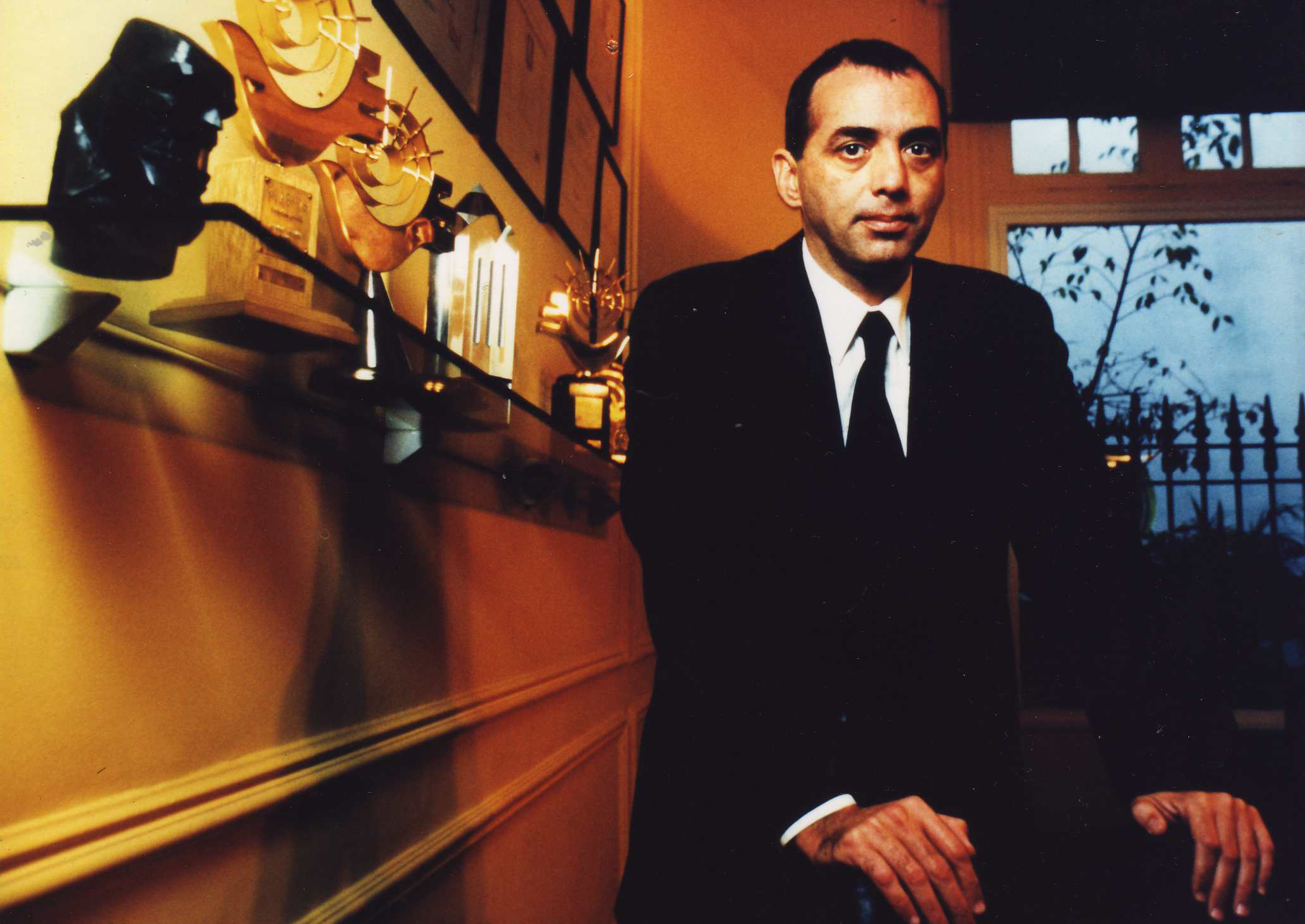
Carlos Souto in 1998

Carlos Souto (born May 13, 1955) is an Argentine advertising executive. He is regarded as one of the leading political advertising executives in Argentina. He runs the advertising agency South Communications, which has been engaged in political advertising since 1996. The work teams he organizes and leads have been a key factor in transforming the Latin American political language over the last decade. He took part in work teams with David Ratto, Ramiro Agulla, Dick Morris, Miguel Sal and Darío Lanis.

== Childhood and youth ==
Carlos Souto was born in Parque Patricios neighborhood in Buenos Aires, Argentina, on May 13, 1955. His parents, Maruja and Celestino, were Galician immigrants. Thanks to them and to his grandmother Carmen, both his sister Ana María and Carlos acquired Galician language before Spanish. He spends his childhood and early youth in the southern suburbs of Buenos Aires City. He started his studies at Colegio Bernasconi. Later, in second grade, he changed school (to Cangallo Schule, a German school in Balvanera neighborhood) where he completed his elementary and high school studies.

== Cursus Honorum ==
After the military coup in Argentina and considering the political commitment he had assumed as a student representative at the Buenos Aires University Engineering School, Souto travelled to Brazil and settled in São Paulo. His first job is as an office boy in the advertising agency Diálogo Propaganda. In 1976, he published his first and only storybook, illustrated by María Teresa Lemos Fontao. After a while, he started working as a TV commercial production assistant. His beginnings were in Flipfilms and in the advertising agency Mauro Salles Interamericana. His rise was rapid. In this way, he met the French director Olivier Perroy, who jointly with Carlo Ponti, Jr., established the international "Filmar do Brasil". In Angra dos Reis they produced the feature film "Pirañas." This would be Souto's only experience in feature films. During the four years he lived in São Paulo, Carlos Souto shared an apartment, O Quatorze in Pinheros, with the Catalan plastic artist and advertising executive Xavier Ruáix Durán. O quatorze would turn into a place of worship for the intellectual, the creative and young moviemakers that came together in São Paulo during the second half of the 1970s. At the beginning of the 1980s, Souto decided to come back to Argentina. In 1983, he organized his first business venture. In 1984, he established a company engaged in the development of brand events. Souto would work in the field of public relations and communication. In the following years, definitely settled in Argentina, Souto developed his first work team connected with the advertising industry.

== First advertising hits ==
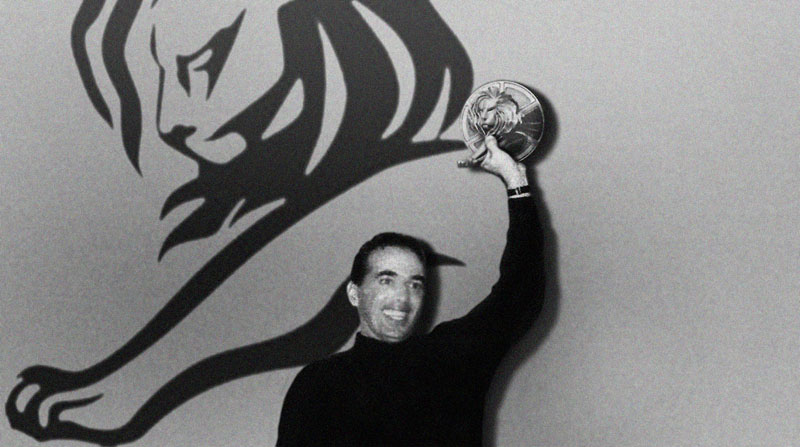
Carlos Souto at the Cannes Festival

In the late 1980s, Souto decides to focus all his experience in setting up a small advertising agency with Argentine share capitals. The basics of his project would be the approach to communication, the primary function of which would be to respect the cultural identity of the society in which the company would operate. Even it could act as a forum to help understand the constructive potential of advertising in social development. As his project is settling, in 1991 he receives his first award, the third place in Clarín Award for Creativity in Newspapers. This would be the beginning of a long path of recognitions for the development of his project. In those years he builds a famous duo with Darío Lanis that would be awarded both nationally and internationally. At the same time, he organizes a work team with remarkable young people like Juan Cravero, Carlos Bayala, Pablo del Campo, Gustavo Taretto, Fernando Tchechenitsky, and Álvaro Fernández Mendy. In 1993, he finally establishes his first advertising agency. In 1994, he enters the advertising agencies creative ranking of the Argentine Chamber of Advertisers, being in the tenth place in the country. In 1995, he participates for the first time in a selection process for the organization of a political campaign. He emerges as the winner; he runs his first political campaign and wins the election. Nevertheless, his communicational work in the goods and services market continues to collect many awards. A short time later he would be awarded with the “Silver Lion” on TV at the Cannes Festival, with a Gold on TV at the London Festival, with a Gold and a Platinum Pencil Award, besides the Grand Prix at Festival Iberoamericano de Publicidad (FIAP), and Gold awards on TV and Radio at the same festival. He is also multi-awarded in Mexico, Brazil, and Colombia, apart from receiving noteworthy recognitions at festivals like the New York Festival or at the Argentine Circle of Creative Designers. The first Souto's website receives the Silver award at the London Festival and at FIAP. During 1999 he decides to set up a new company, Adlatina.com, a website specialized in marketing and advertising.

== Political marketing ==
Carlos Souto begins his experience in the field of political advertising in 1995 and since then the team he leads has accompanied each of the most important moments in the history of elections in Argentina. Throughout his career and thanks to his work, Carlos Souto is called for the most important political campaigns in Argentina, in which he achieves memorable hits. He wins two presidential elections, two elections for Buenos Aires Mayor, and one for Mendoza Province Governor. Recently, he has won a mid-term legislative election in Buenos Aires Province. He has the chance to be responsible for the institutional communication of several government efforts and to advise different politicians and businessmen in crisis situations. His work in the elections field is praised for the creative quality of the audiovisual pieces as well as for those of the public highway, apart from the standards applied to production. Many of the commercials he has made throughout his career are part of the communicational and cultural values of his country.

== Political campaigns ==
Year	Candidate	Office
1996	Fernando de la Rúa	Mayor of the City of Buenos Aires
1998	Fernando de la Rúa	Primary Election — Alianza
1999	Fernando de la Rúa	President of the Argentine Republic
2000	Aníbal Ibarra	Mayor of the City of Buenos Aires
2003	Carlos Menem	President of the Argentine Republic
2003	Julio Cobos	Governor of the Province of Mendoza
2005	Luis Brandoni	Senator of the Province of Buenos Aires
2007	Jorge Telerman	Mayor of the City of Buenos Aires
2007	Francisco de Narváez	Governor of the Province of Buenos Aires
2009	Francisco de Narváez	Member of the Parliament of the Buenos Aires Province
2011	Jimmy Jairala	Prefectura de Guayas. Ecuador.
2012	Javier Duarte de Ochoa	Governmental Communication. State of Veracruz. México.
2013	Javier Duarte de Ochoa	Governor of the State of Veracruz
2014	Ministry of Youth and Sports of Qatar	National Day of Qatar. Institutional Communication

== Awards ==
In 2000, Carlos Souto was awarded with the Silver Cannes Lion at Cannes Festival. In addition, he was awarded with national and international awards, both in the political field and for his communication pieces, some of which are listed below.

- Cannes International Advertising Festival > Silver Lion - TV — Category Institutes
- London International Advertising Awards > Gold - Television - Category Retail Services
- London International Advertising Awards > Silver - Television - Category Web Sites
- London International Advertising Awards > Finalist - Television - Category Humour
- London International Advertising Awards > Finalist - Television - Category Direction/Dialogue
- London International Advertising Awards > Finalist - Television - Category Corporate
- London International Advertising Awards > Finalist - Television - Category Low Budget
- New York Festivals > Bronze - Television - Category Services
- New York Festivals > Bronze - Television - Category Retail Dealers
- New York Festivals > Finalist - Television - Category Best Humorous Spot
- FIAP - (Latin American Advertising Festival) > Grand Prix - Radio - All categories
- FIAP - Golden Sun - Radio - Category Services
- FIAP - Golden Sun - Television - Category Education Institutes
- FIAP - Golden Sun - Radio - Category Campaigns
- FIAP - Golden Sun - Internet - Category Websites
- FIAP - Finalist - Television - Category Services Campaign
- FIAP - Finalist - Radio - Category Services Campaign
- FIAP - Finalist - Radio - Category Education Institutes
- The One Show > The One Show Merit Award
- Brazilian Advertising Festival > Golden Lamp - Television - Category Services
- Brazilian Advertising Festival > Golden Lamp - Television - Category Education
- Brazilian Advertising Festival > Golden Sun - Radio - Category Services
- Festival Mundial de Publicidade de Gramado > Galo de Prata - Radio - Category Education
- Festival of Creativity > Grand Prix - Television
- Festival of Creativity > Golden Eagle - Television - Category Schools and Education Institutes
- Festival of Creativity > Bronze Eagle - Television - Category Schools and Education Institutes
- Latin American Golden Dial > Second Grand Golden Dial - Radio - All categories
- Latin American Golden Dial > Golden Dial - Radio - Category Services
- Argentine Circle of Creative Designers > Golden Tooth - Television - Category Services
- Golden Pencil > Golden Pencil - Radio - Category Education Institutes
- Platinum Pencil > Platinum Pencil - Radio - All categories
- Clarín Award for Creativity in Newspapers > First Prize - Black and White Graphics - Category Clothing
- Clarín Award for Creativity in Newspapers > First Prize - Black and White Graphics - Category Books Schools Universities
- Clarín Award for Creativity in Newspapers > Second Prize - Black and White Graphics - Category Clothing, Household Linens, Lingerie
- Clarín Award for Creativity in Newspapers > Third Prize - Black and White Graphics - Category Clothing
- Clarín Award for Creativity in Newspapers > Third Prize - Black and White Graphics - Category Clothing
- National Advertising Contest > First Prize - Category Institutional
- National Advertising Contest > First Prize - Category Financial Institutions
- National Advertising Contest > Second Prize - Category Financial Institutions
- Ether Award for Radio Activity
- Reed Latino Awards > Best Gubernamental Communication Piece (2013)
- Victory Awards > Political Campaign of the Year (2014)
- Latino Reed Awards > Consultant of The Year (2014)

== Related Articles and Google Books ==
- Alberto Borrini
- Gustavo Martínez Pandiani
- Ernesto Semán
- Marcelo Bonelli
