= Nico (footballer, born 1941) =

Brazilian footballer

Personal information
- Full name: Antônio Azambuja Nunes
- Date of birth: 23 August 1941 (age 85)
- Place of birth: Colorado, Brazil
- Position: Forward

Senior career*
| Years | Team | Apps | (Gls) |
| 1957–1963 | Rio Grande | | |
| 1964–1980 | Rio-Grandense | | |
- * Club domestic league appearances and goals as of 19 March 2024

Antônio Azambuja Nunes (born 23 August 1941), better known as Nico, is a Brazilian former professional footballer who played as a forward.

== Career ==
Nico, also called "Bombeador" (English: Bomber) due to his kicks, played for SC Rio Grande and FC Rio-Grandense in the city of Rio Grande, Rio Grande do Sul. It is claimed that he scored more than 800 goals, a fact impossible to prove in professional football, but in 1967 he was the top scorer in the Gaucho championship with 16 goals playing for the Rio-Grandense.

In 1969 he played alongside Garrincha in the Rio Grande city championship, and in 2022 he entered the field in the club's friendly, being honored and scoring a penalty goal.

== Honours ==
Rio Grande

- Campeonato Citadino de Rio Grande: 1961, 1962

Rio-Grandense

- Campeonato Gaúcho Série A2: 1965
- Campeonato Citadino de Rio Grande: 1974, 1975, 1976, 1977, 1978
- Copa Cícero Soares: 1973

Individual

- 1967 Campeonato Gaúcho top scorer: 16 goals

== Bibliography ==
- Nilo Dias (2017). Nico, o Bombardeador (in Portuguese). ISBN 978-0000118967.
