= Nico (disambiguation) =

Nico (Christa Päffgen, 1938–1988) was a German singer-songwriter, fashion model and actress.

Nico may also refer to:

== People ==
- Nico (given name), includes a list of people with the name
- Nico (Romanian singer) (born 1970)
- Nico (Norwegian singer), of the duo Nico & Vinz

== Arts and entertainment ==
- Nico (album), a 1996 album by the group Blind Melon
- Nico (TV series), a 2001 cartoon about a blind boy
- Nico the Unicorn, a 1996 book and film based on it
- Nico (film), a 1988 film, best known as Above the Law
- Nico, the development name of Shadow of the Colossus, a 2005 video game
- "The Nico", the original name of Omnipotent Youth Society, a Chinese alternative rock band formed in 1996

== Other uses ==
- Nico (gorilla) (1961–2018)
- Nico (restaurant), a defunct restaurant in San Francisco, United States
- Naftiran Intertrade (trading code "NICO"), Swiss-based subsidiary of the National Iranian Oil Company
- Neuralgia-inducing cavitational osteonecrosis, a medical condition

== See also ==
- Niko (disambiguation)
- Nicolas (disambiguation)
