= Antonio Mariño Souto =

Cuban painter (1935–2023)

Antonio Mariño Souto Ñico
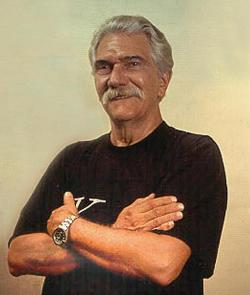
- Born: 16 September 1935; Cuba
- Died: 15 May 2023 (aged 87)
- Education: Centro Gallego de La Habana

Antonio Mariño Souto Ñico (16 September 1935 – 15 May 2023) was a Cuban painter and comics artist.

He graduated from the Concepción Arenal School in the Centro Gallego in Havana, Cuba, with a degree in plastic arts, and also has a degree in journalism. He is a painter, graphic designer, and caricaturist, as well as a founding member of the National Union of Writers and Artists of Cuba (Spanish: Unión de Escritores y Artistas de Cuba, "UNEAC") and the Union of Journalists of Cuba. He is also a member of the Association of Plastic Artists of UNESCO (Asociación de Artistas Plásticos de la UNESCO, "AIAP") and the Latin American Association of Cartoonists (Asociación Iberoamericana de humoristas gráficos)

He has received 12 international awards and 83 national awards. He is the author of five humorous novels. His work has appeared in numerous publications, as well as national and international catalogues. He has judged national and international events involving journalism and the plastic arts.

Souto died on 15 May 2023, at the age of 87.

== Gallery at Wikimedia ==
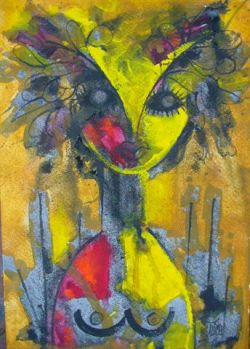
Mujer de tonos

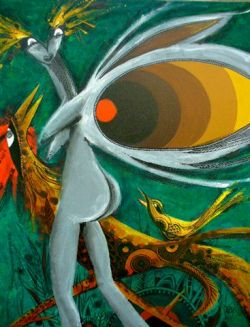
El Pájaro Tú y Yo

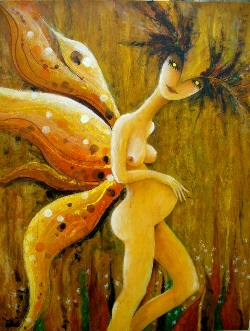
Gestación
