= Volleyball at the 2004 Summer Olympics – Men's qualification =

2004 Volleyball at the Summer Olympics – Men's qualification
- Dates: 7 September 2003 – 30 May 2004
- Teams: 21 (from 5 confederations)

The qualification for 2004 Men's Olympic Volleyball Tournament was held from 7 September 2003 to 30 May 2004.

== Means of qualification ==
Qualified for the 2004 Summer Olympics
Qualified for the 2004 World Olympic Qualification Tournaments

== Host country ==
FIVB reserved a vacancy for the 2004 Summer Olympics host country to participate in the tournament.

- Greece

== 2003 World Cup ==
- Venues: Japan
- Dates: 16–29 November 2003
- The top three teams qualified for the 2004 Summer Olympics.

Rank	Team
1st place, gold medalist(s)	Brazil
2nd place, silver medalist(s)	Italy
3rd place, bronze medalist(s)	Serbia and Montenegro
4	United States
5	France
6	South Korea
7	Canada
8	Venezuela
9	Japan
10	China
11	Tunisia
12	Egypt

== Continental qualification tournaments ==
=== Africa ===
- Venue: El Menzah Sports Palace, Tunis, Tunisia
- Dates: 5–10 January 2004
- The winners qualified for the 2004 Summer Olympics. The runners-up qualified for the 2004 World Olympic Qualification Tournaments.

Pos	Team	Pld	W	L	Pts	SW	SL	SR	SPW	SPL	SPR	Qualification
1	Tunisia	3	3	0	6	9	0	MAX	225	159	1.415	2004 Summer Olympics
2	Egypt	3	2	1	5	6	3	2.000	211	201	1.050	2004 World Olympic Qualification Tournaments
3	Algeria	3	1	2	4	3	7	0.429	216	241	0.896	
4	South Africa	3	0	3	3	1	9	0.111	196	247	0.794	

Date		Score		Set 1	Set 2	Set 3	Set 4	Set 5	Total
5 Jan	South Africa	1–3	Algeria	25–22	22–25	18–25	22–25		87–97
6 Jan	Tunisia	3–0	Algeria	25–21	25–18	25–16			75–55
7 Jan	South Africa	0–3	Egypt	20–25	22–25	20–25			62–75
9 Jan	Egypt	3–0	Algeria	25–22	29–27	25–15			79–64
9 Jan	Tunisia	3–0	South Africa	25–19	25–18	25–10			75–47
10 Jan	Tunisia	3–0	Egypt	25–19	25–16	25–22			75–57

=== Asia and Oceania ===
The 2004 Asian Olympic Qualification Tournament combined with 2004 2nd World Olympic Qualification Tournament. The hosts Japan and the top four ranked teams except Japan from the 2003 Asian Championship competed in the tournament. The top ranked among the five teams except the 2004 2nd World Olympic Qualification Tournament winners qualified for the 2004 Summer Olympics as the 2004 Asian Olympic Qualification Tournament winners.

=== Europe ===
- Venue: Arena Leipzig, Leipzig, Germany
- Dates: 5–10 January 2004
- The winners qualified for the 2004 Summer Olympics.

Rank	Team
1	Russia
2	Netherlands
3	France
3	Germany
5	Bulgaria
5	Spain
7	Finland
7	Poland

=== North America ===
- Venue: Coliseo Héctor Solá Bezares, Caguas, Puerto Rico
- Dates: 4–10 January 2004
- The winners qualified for the 2004 Summer Olympics. The second and third ranked teams qualified for the 2004 World Olympic Qualification Tournaments.

Rank	Team
1	United States
2	Cuba
3	Canada
4	Puerto Rico
5	Mexico

=== South America ===
- Venue: Poliedro de Caracas, Caracas, Venezuela
- Dates: 9–11 January 2004
- The winners qualified for the 2004 Summer Olympics. The runners-up qualified for the 2004 World Olympic Qualification Tournaments.

Pos	Team	Pld	W	L	Pts	SW	SL	SR	SPW	SPL	SPR	Qualification
1	Argentina	3	3	0	6	9	0	MAX	225	149	1.510	2004 Summer Olympics
2	Venezuela	3	2	1	5	6	3	2.000	210	165	1.273	2004 World Olympic Qualification Tournaments
3	Peru	3	1	2	4	3	7	0.429	182	242	0.752	
4	Chile	3	0	3	3	1	9	0.111	183	244	0.750	

Date		Score		Set 1	Set 2	Set 3	Set 4	Set 5	Total
9 Jan	Chile	0–3	Argentina	16–25	13–25	14–25			43–75
9 Jan	Peru	0–3	Venezuela	17–25	10–25	15–25			42–75
10 Jan	Argentina	3–0	Peru	25–13	25–15	25–18			75–46
10 Jan	Venezuela	3–0	Chile	25–13	25–16	25–19			75–48
11 Jan	Chile	1–3	Peru	25–15	27–29	22–25	18–25		92–94
11 Jan	Argentina	3–0	Venezuela	25–18	25–19	25–23			75–60

== World qualification tournaments ==
Qualified teams

- Hosts
  - Portugal
  - Japan
  - Spain
- Qualified through the 2003 Asian Championship.
  - South Korea *
  - China *
  - Iran *
  - Australia *
  - Kazakhstan
  - Chinese Taipei ^{1}
- Qualified through the Continental Olympic Qualification Tournament or the FIVB World Ranking as of January 2004.
  - Egypt ^{1} (as African Olympic Qualification Tournament 2nd place)
  - France (as World Ranking for European Team)
  - Netherlands (as World Ranking for European Team)
  - Poland (as World Ranking for European Team)
  - Cuba (as North American Olympic Qualification Tournament 2nd place)
  - Canada (as North American Olympic Qualification Tournament 3rd place)
  - Venezuela (as South American Olympic Qualification Tournament 2nd place)

* The top four teams from 2003 Asian Championship were predetermined to be in 2nd tournament in Japan.

^1 – Cameroon and Algeria replaced Chinese Taipei and Egypt, who withdrew from the tournament.

=== 1st tournament ===
- Venue: Centro de Desportos e Congressos de Matosinhos, Matosinhos, Portugal
- Dates: 21–23 May 2004
- All times are Western European Summer Time (UTC+01:00).
- The winners qualified for the 2004 Summer Olympics.

Pos	Team	Pld	W	L	Pts	SW	SL	SR	SPW	SPL	SPR	Qualification
1	Poland	3	3	0	6	9	2	4.500	261	220	1.186	2004 Summer Olympics
2	Venezuela	3	2	1	5	6	3	2.000	220	211	1.043	
3	Portugal	3	1	2	4	5	6	0.833	248	241	1.029	
4	Kazakhstan	3	0	3	3	0	9	0.000	168	225	0.747	

Date	Time		Score		Set 1	Set 2	Set 3	Set 4	Set 5	Total	Report
21 May	18:00	Poland	3–0	Venezuela	25–21	26–24	25–22			76–67	P2
21 May	20:02	Portugal	3–0	Kazakhstan	25–16	25–18	25–19			75–53	P2
22 May	15:04	Kazakhstan	0–3	Venezuela	23–25	21–25	21–25			65–75	P2
22 May	17:15	Portugal	2–3	Poland	18–25	25–18	29–27	19–25	12–15	103–110	P2
23 May	14:00	Poland	3–0	Kazakhstan	25–15	25–13	25–22			75–50	P2
23 May	16:00	Venezuela	3–0	Portugal	26–24	27–25	25–21			78–70	P2

=== 2nd tournament ===
- Venue: Tokyo Metropolitan Gymnasium, Tokyo, Japan
- Dates: 22–30 May 2004
- All times are Japan Standard Time (UTC+09:00).
- The winners and the best Asian team except the winners qualified for the 2004 Summer Olympics.

Pos	Team	Pld	W	L	Pts	SW	SL	SR	SPW	SPL	SPR	Qualification
1	France	7	7	0	14	21	2	10.500	586	475	1.234	2004 Summer Olympics
2	Australia	7	5	2	12	15	9	1.667	565	510	1.108	2004 Summer Olympics
3	China	7	5	2	12	15	9	1.667	581	538	1.080	
4	Canada	7	4	3	11	12	10	1.200	512	485	1.056	
5	Iran	7	4	3	11	13	11	1.182	567	545	1.040	
6	Japan	7	2	5	9	14	15	0.933	626	622	1.006	
7	South Korea	7	1	6	8	5	18	0.278	469	547	0.857	
8	Algeria	7	0	7	7	0	21	0.000	341	525	0.650	

Date	Time		Score		Set 1	Set 2	Set 3	Set 4	Set 5	Total	Report
22 May	11:00	Canada	3–0	Iran	25–20	25–20	28–26			78–66	P2
22 May	13:00	South Korea	0–3	China	19–25	23–25	22–25			64–75	P2
22 May	15:00	Australia	0–3	France	18–25	28–30	26–28			72–83	P2
22 May	18:00	Algeria	0–3	Japan	14–25	15–25	18–25			47–75	P2
23 May	11:00	Iran	3–0	South Korea	25–18	25–21	25–16			75–55	P2
23 May	13:00	France	3–0	Canada	25–22	25–23	25–21			75–66	P2
23 May	15:00	Algeria	0–3	Australia	17–25	22–25	16–25			55–75	P2
23 May	18:00	Japan	2–3	China	25–27	25–20	22–25	25–22	16–18	113–112	P2
25 May	11:00	China	3–1	Iran	25–16	25–23	31–33	25–22		106–94	P2
25 May	13:10	South Korea	0–3	France	16–25	13–25	16–25			45–75	P2
25 May	15:00	Canada	3–0	Algeria	25–13	25–16	25–21			75–50	P2
25 May	18:00	Australia	3–2	Japan	21–25	25–17	25–14	19–25	15–13	105–94	P2
26 May	11:00	France	3–0	China	25–21	38–36	25–21			88–78	P2
26 May	13:00	Australia	3–0	Canada	25–19	25–19	26–24			76–62	P2
26 May	15:00	Algeria	0–3	South Korea	21–25	15–25	19–25			55–75	P2
26 May	18:01	Japan	2–3	Iran	22–25	29–27	25–18	21–25	12–15	109–110	P2
28 May	11:00	South Korea	1–3	Australia	21–25	15–25	25–21	19–25		80–96	P2
28 May	13:00	Iran	0–3	France	31–33	19–25	21–25			71–83	P2
28 May	15:00	China	3–0	Algeria	25–15	25–16	25–15			75–46	P2
28 May	18:00	Canada	3–0	Japan	25–15	25–17	27–25			77–57	P2
29 May	11:00	Algeria	0–3	Iran	17–25	18–25	13–25			48–75	P2
29 May	13:00	Canada	3–1	South Korea	25–21	21–25	25–22	25–18		96–86	P2
29 May	15:00	Australia	3–0	China	25–21	25–20	25–19			75–60	P2
29 May	18:00	Japan	2–3	France	23–25	25–21	18–25	25–21	12–15	103–107	P2
30 May	11:00	Iran	3–0	Australia	25–19	26–24	25–23			76–66	P2
30 May	13:00	China	3–0	Canada	25–22	25–19	25–17			75–58	P2
30 May	15:00	France	3–0	Algeria	25–16	25–11	25–13			75–40	P2
30 May	18:00	South Korea	0–3	Japan	20–25	21–25	23–25			64–75	P2

=== 3rd tournament ===
- Venue: Madrid Arena, Madrid, Spain
- Dates: 28–30 May 2004
- All times are Central European Summer Time (UTC+02:00).
- The winners qualified for the 2004 Summer Olympics.

Pos	Team	Pld	W	L	Pts	SW	SL	SR	SPW	SPL	SPR	Qualification
1	Netherlands	3	3	0	6	9	1	9.000	258	222	1.162	2004 Summer Olympics
2	Cuba	3	2	1	5	7	4	1.750	258	242	1.066	
3	Spain	3	1	2	4	4	6	0.667	220	216	1.019	
4	Cameroon	3	0	3	3	0	9	0.000	171	227	0.753	

Date	Time		Score		Set 1	Set 2	Set 3	Set 4	Set 5	Total	Report
28 May	17:00	Cameroon	0–3	Netherlands	21–25	25–27	18–25			64–77	P2
28 May	19:30	Spain	1–3	Cuba	17–25	25–14	23–25	16–25		81–89	P2
29 May	16:00	Cameroon	0–3	Spain	14–25	17–25	20–25			51–75	P2
29 May	18:30	Netherlands	3–1	Cuba	25–19	30–28	25–27	25–20		105–94	P2
30 May	10:00	Cuba	3–0	Cameroon	25–20	25–23	25–13			75–56	P2
30 May	12:30	Spain	0–3	Netherlands	20–25	20–25	24–26			64–76	P2
