= Nico Nyberg =

Finnish ice hockey player

- Born: September 7, 1993 (age 31); Espoo, Finland
- Height: 6 ft 0 in (183 cm)
- Weight: 176 lb (80 kg; 12 st 8 lb)
- Position: Forward
- Shoots: Left
- Liiga team Former teams: Free Agent; Espoo Blues
- Playing career: 2012–present

Nico Nyberg (born September 7, 1993) is a Finnish professional ice hockey player. He is currently an unrestricted free agent who most recently played with Espoo Blues in the Finnish Liiga.

Nyberg made his SM-liiga debut playing with Espoo Blues during the 2012–13 SM-liiga season.
