= Nico Bodonczy =

Chilean-American soccer player (born 1955)

Personal information
- Date of birth: February 26, 1955 (age 71)
- Place of birth: Santiago, Chile
- Height: 6 ft 0 in (1.83 m)
- Position: Striker

Senior career*
Years	Team	Apps	(Gls)
1974	Cincinnati Comets		
1975–1976	Miami Toros	19	(4)
1975–1976	Miami Toros (indoor)	4	(8)
1977–1980	Fort Lauderdale Strikers	21	(2)
1979–1980	Fort Lauderdale Strikers (indoor)	18	(4)
1980	Miami Americans	3	(0)
1981	Pennsylvania Stoners	1	(0)
Total		66+	(18+)
- * Club domestic league appearances and goals

Nicholas Bodonczy (born February 26, 1955) is a Chilean-American former professional soccer player who played as a striker.

== Playing career ==
Bodonczy played in the North American Soccer League between 1975 and 1981 for the Miami Toros and Fort Lauderdale Strikers. He also played in the American Soccer League for the Cincinnati Comets, the Miami Americans, and the Pennsylvania Stoners.

== Coaching career ==
In 1981, Bodonczy briefly coached the Plantation High School boys' soccer team before being fired during the season. He later served prison time for a drug charge.
