= List of Every Witch Way episodes =

Every Witch Way is an American teen sitcom that premiered on Nickelodeon on January 1, 2014. It is the United States' version of Nickelodeon Latin America from the series Grachi, starring with Isabella Castillo. The series tells the story of 14-year-old Emma Alonso who moves to Miami, Florida, with her father, and finds out that she's a witch and the most powerful of her generation.

On March 13, 2014, Nickelodeon announced a second season of Every Witch Way that aired from July 7, 2014, to August 8, 2014.

On July 31, 2014, Nickelodeon announced a third season, that aired from January 5, 2015 to January 30, 2015.

On February 25, 2015, Nickelodeon announced a fourth season and a spin-off series called W.I.T.s Academy, which premiered on October 5, 2015.

== Series overview ==
Season	Episodes	Originally released (U.S.)	
Season	Episodes	First released	Last released
1	20	January 1, 2014	January 30, 2014
2	24	July 7, 2014	August 8, 2014
Special		November 26, 2014	
3	20	January 5, 2015	January 30, 2015
4	20	July 6, 2015	July 30, 2015

== Episodes ==
=== Season 1 (2014) ===
No. overall	No. in season	Title	Directed by	Written by	Original air date	Production code	US viewers (millions)
1	1	"Discovery"	Arturo Manuitt & Leonardo Galavis	Catharina Ledeboer	January 1, 2014	101	2.08
Emma Alonso and her father Francisco have just moved to Miami, and her new neighbor Andi Cruz introduces herself, quickly befriending Emma as she helps her unload her stuff into her new house. Emma also makes eye contact with another one of her new neighbors, Daniel Miller, who she instantly forms a crush on. As Emma continues to unpack, many strange things continue to happen to her, such as the refrigerator opening without her even touching it. However, Francisco convinces her there is nothing to worry about. Meanwhile, Daniel calls his on-off again girlfriend Maddie Van Pelt to babysit his three younger siblings, known as The Terrible 3 due to their reputation of obnoxious pranks. Things go awry however when Maddie instead hosts a spa day at the house, which causes a huge mess. This leads to Daniel losing patience with Maddie and for her to furiously break up with him. On Emma's first day at Iridium High, Andi informs her of the school gossip Gigi, nicknamed Miss Information. She also warns her to stay away from the Panthers, a popular clique consisting of Maddie, and her two best friends, smart and loyal Katie Rice and ditzy and airheaded Sophie Johnson. Daniel gets assigned to show Emma around school on her first day of school, but when a butterfly appears in the office, (which Daniel is extremely allergic to), Emma runs off in a panic and accidentally knocks down Maddie, and the two of them mysteriously levitate Maddie's smoothie before it hits the ground. When Maddie sees Daniel with Emma, she becomes extremely jealous as she believes her and Daniel are still together, instantly seeing Emma as an enemy. Later, Maddie and the Panthers are talking, and Maddie accidentally turns Katie's hair blue after saying a phrase that rhymes. Maddie tells her mother Ursula about school, and Ursula immediately becomes suspicious of Emma. As they also are new neighbors of Emma, Ursula convinces Maddie to properly introduce themselves. Later that night, Maddie persistently calls Daniel while he and the Sharks are trying to study for an upcoming Math test, and Emma and Andi have a sleepover. As strange occurrences continue to happen, Andi proposes a solution: that Emma is a witch.
2	2	"The Big Rescue"	Arturo Manuitt & Leonardo Galavis	Catharina Ledeboer	January 2, 2014	102	2.86
Before school, Andi is trying to get Emma to use her powers, but they have no success. Meanwhile, Ursula and Maddie are talking and Ursula finally decides to tell Maddie that they are witches, but Maddie thinks the idea is ridiculous. Ursula reveals to Maddie that you have to rhyme to cast a spell. Due to being unable to study the night before because of Maddie constantly calling Daniel, the Sharks, (consisting of Diego Rueda, Mac Davis, and Andi) are all convinced that they will flunk their Math test and get kicked off the team. Their friend Tony Myers has the idea that in Chemistry class, they set off a smoke bomb. Although he is reluctant about the idea, the Sharks are all on board. Meanwhile, Emma is in the bathroom stall as the Panthers walk in, and overhears them talking, including hearing Maddie stating that you have to rhyme to spell, and also that Maddie's mom had told her that she's a witch. With Maddie accusing Emma of spying on her, Emma tries to help Maddie with casting a spell, accidentally giving Katie gigantic feet. The Sharks set off a smoke bomb, which quickly spreads around the school. As the Panthers and Emma run out of the bathroom, Maddie casts a spell and locks Emma inside. Daniel decides to go back inside to rescue her, but Emma casts a spell and teleports herself to the pool after Daniel breaks through the door. Iridium High's principal, Principal Torres, suspects that the Sharks are responsible for the smoke bomb, and all of them decide to confess to avoid only one of them getting all the blame. Later during the school day, Maddie becomes annoyed with Katie again and accidentally turns her hair red. With Ursula learning of this, she tells Maddie she will help her control her powers, and tells her that during the eclipse, if she has a magical book called the Hexoran, she can steal The Chosen One's powers and become the strongest witch. She also tells her that Emma could possibly have the Hexoran. Maddie fails to cast spells correctly, causing Ursula to lose patience. Meanwhile, Emma and Andi meet up and Emma tries casting spells on Andi, but still to no success. Remembering what Maddie said in the bathroom about spells having to rhyme, she decides to give it a shot and successfully turns Andi into a goat after casting a spell. Francisco tells the girls it is time for dinner, and knocks on the door for them to come out, causing Emma to panic as she can not let Francisco see that Andi is a goat.
3	3	"The Big Chill"	Arturo Manuitt & Leonardo Galavis	Catharina Ledeboer	January 3, 2014	103	2.31
Emma quickly undoes the spell and turns Andi back into human as Francisco walks inside her room. Ursula is still trying to train Maddie but is still unable to get her to properly cast a spell. Emma is having a hard time processing her powers and being a witch, but Andi tells her they should keep it between themselves so no one else figures out what's going on. At lunch, Maddie finds Emma and Daniel sitting together and once again becomes extremely jealous, warning Emma again to stay away from her boyfriend. As Emma tells her she can't tell her who she can and can't be friends with, Maddie attempts to cast a spell that would make everyone give Emma the cold shoulder, but accidentally literally freezes her solid. Daniel, Diego and Mac take Emma to the school nurse Lily, who reveals to Emma that she was sent to Iridium High to be Emma's Guardian and to aid Emma as she continues to process her powers. She also reveals that she knows Maddie is a witch too and believes she will turn out to be a bad one. Emma denies everything as she does not trust Nurse Lily yet, but she tells Emma that she will need her as her powers might be stolen in the upcoming eclipse. Meanwhile, the Sharks are hosting a tryout and Tony successfully qualifies onto the team, and they celebrate by making Tony go through an obstacle course that the Terrible Three created. Principal Torres states she will take down the Sharks one by one, starting with Mac. Ursula finds out that Katie and Sophie also know that Maddie is a witch, and decides that she has to continue to train Maddie to cast spells as time is running out. Maddie attempts to cast a spell on Sophie, but it fails as Ursula tells her she has to focus and concentrate properly in order for the spell to work, but finds out that Maddie froze Emma and finds it very impressive. Now thinking she has a chance of stealing The Chosen One's powers, Ursula tells Maddie she must learn to master undoing spells in case she gets in a magical duel. Nurse Lily starts to follow Emma and finds out about Emma turning Andi into a goat, and says that it supports her theory about Emma, that she's The Chosen One. Lily tells Emma her job is to teach her all about magic and protect her before the eclipse, and tells Emma about how someone could steal her powers during then. Emma also learns her mother was a witch. At the Sharks swim meet versus the Dolphins, Maddie and the Panthers sit near Emma, and the two begin to bicker as Maddie states she will make sure Daniel wins, but Emma tells Maddie Daniel wouldn't want to cheat. Maddie accidentally casts a spell on Daniel that was meant for his opponent: to make him do the doggy paddle.
4	4	"I'm a Witch"	Arturo Manuitt & Leonardo Galavis	Catharina Ledeboer	January 6, 2014	104	1.95
Emma casts a spell on Daniel that makes him swim incredibly quickly in order to prevent him from losing, and also starts a chant in the audience to motivate Daniel, but Maddie takes credit for starting the chant which causes Daniel to see Maddie's good side again. Nurse Lily saw Emma and Maddie casting spells on Daniel and warns Emma to use her magic carefully. The Dolphins Coach proposes to the referee that Daniel should be disqualified for not swimming the correct stroke. Because he got disqualified, he lost a bet with the opposing team, so he has to salsa dance in front of everyone, In order to prevent Daniel from getting humiliated, Emma steps in to dance with him and the rest of the Sharks also begin dancing. Maddie is now convinced that Emma is a witch after seeing Emma use magic and casts a spell to teleport herself to spy on Emma and Daniel, which shrinks her and teleports her to the table Emma and Daniel are sitting at. Emma traps Maddie into the ketchup bottle and shakes it vigorously, causing Maddie to get covered in ketchup and her swearing revenge on Emma. As Daniel and Emma are walking home, Daniel learns from his coach that he is no longer disqualified and won the swim meet fairly, and Emma accidentally causes a rainbow to appear in the night sky while she is with him. Emma now wants to stop using magic altogether as she believes it causes problems, but Andi tells her she needs to focus on magic because Maddie might steal her powers at the eclipse if she is The Chosen One. Nurse Lily informs Emma that she needs to find the Hexoren, the book of spells that belongs to The Chosen One, and Emma and Andi begin to search for it. Meanwhile, Daniel and Diego are studying at his house, and Diego accidentally freezes Daniel's notebook solid and throws it onto the ground, causing it to break into pieces. Tony convinces Diego and Daniel that this was actually a prank by The Terrible Three, but Diego is still unsure. Emma and Andi find the Hexoren and Emma begins practicing spells. As she is preparing for her upcoming first date with Daniel, dinner with his parents, Andi tells Emma she should use the glamour spell in the Hexoren. However when Emma casts the spell she says she wants to look cool like Nicki Minaj, and the spell literally transform her appearance into Nicki Minaj, much to Emma's shock. Maddie casts a love spell on a pie, and plans to give it to Daniel so he falls in love with her again. The family dinner is extremely awkward as most of Daniel's family is laughing at Emma. Much to Emma's dismay, Maddie arrives at Daniel's house with the pie, and she eagerly walks in.
5	5	"Magic Fight Club"	Arturo Manuitt & Leonardo Galavis	Catharina Ledeboer	January 7, 2014	105	2.41
Maddie attempts to give the love pie to Daniel, but he tells her he would prefer to eat it after dinner, and still decides to put it off until after him and his family clean the table. Maddie tells Emma she's onto her. Tommy sneakily takes the pie and eats it, but he does not instantly fall in love with Maddie. It is revealed that the pie Maddie had was a regular pie, and Katie actually had the pie that Maddie cast the spell on. She gives it to Mac and Diego, and they eat it and instantly fall in love with Katie, as she wants to gain more attention and dethrone Maddie as the most popular girl in school. Emma attempts to take off her outfit that night, but she fails, and has no choice but to go to school the next morning in the outfit, making her get plenty of attention from Miss Information. Emma goes to Nurse Lily and she helps her undo the spell and return to normal. Sophie understands that Katie switched the pies, but Katie tells her not to tell Maddie. Later in school, Maddie runs into Emma and discovers that she has the Hexoren, the book Ursula had told her about. Maddie and Emma then engage in a magical duel, culminating in a classroom, until Principal Torres catches them, and starts to become suspicious, but it is revealed another student Sebastian was also in the classroom at the same time as Maddie and Emma. The Principal asks him for details, and he reveals he saw them teleporting into different lockers, and that one of them had a big bright book with them. She then turns him into a frog. Nurse Lily warns Emma she can't let anyone be suspicious of her. They also both collectively agree that the Principal is very suspicious and think she is hiding something. In order to find out more information about Emma, Principal Torres invites Gigi to her office. However Gigi starts to become suspicious of the principal and her frogs resulting in the Principal almost turning her into one, before they are interrupted by Coach Julio, revealed to be the Principal's son. Diego and Maddie start bothering Katie too much, and Diego accidentally freezes Mac's lunch tray solid. The Principal realizes that Maddie and Emma must both be witches, and reveals she wants to take over the world. Later at The Seven, Tony is hosting a magic show, and Emma secretly uses magic to make it seem like Tony is actually a magician. Backstage, Tony is getting ready to do his next trick with Andi as a volunteer, despite her not wanting to be seen in her outfit. Emma accidentally breaks a vase that was backstage, and uses magic to repair it, but Tony sees the whole thing and is stunned.
6	6	"Monkey Business"	Arturo Manuitt & Leonardo Galavis	Catharina Ledeboer	January 8, 2014	106	1.92
Tony believes that Emma is a magician, and that her trick wasn't that bad, which Andi finds funny. At Maddie's Ursula is ready to teach Maddie another magic lesson, but she insists she is off to The Seven due to seeing Emma and Daniel are sitting together in a blog post from Miss Information. She also tricks Ursula into thinking she would transform her outfit into one that she would wear when she sees Francisco later, and locks her in the closet. Maddie sees Diego and Mac swooning over Katie and realizes she switched the love pies and becomes furious. At Tony's magic show, Emma continues to use magic to help him succeed, and Maddie volunteers herself and Emma to participate in Tony's next trick. However it goes awry when during a sawing a woman in half trick, Tony accidentally spins Maddie around and she crashes into the wall, breaking her arm in the process. At school the next day in the bathroom, Katie begs Maddie to reverse the love spell on Mac and Diego but Maddie refuses, and nearly finishes casting a spell to turn her into one of Mac's socks but she is interrupted by Nurse Lily, who yells at her to not use spells during school, causing Maddie and Katie to become very suspicious of her and Nurse Lily to make up an excuse for what she meant. Meanwhile, Principal Torres invites Emma to her office and attempts to get her to finish a rhyme in order to prove she is a witch, but Emma is saved by Andi. Maddie finally reverses the love spell on Mac and Diego, freeing Katie from their affections. Nurse Lily sneaks into the Principal's office later, and discovers that one of the frogs she has is actually a teacher, and she realizes that every frog the Principal has was turned into one. Coach Julio walks into the office, and becomes very suspicious of Nurse Lily as she quickly makes an excuse to run out. Sophie spys on Emma and Andi and she tells Maddie and Katie that Nurse Lily is helping Emma to use the Hexoren. Not wanting this to continue, Maddie casts a spell and turns Nurse Lily into a monkey. She quickly calls Emma and Andi into her office as she almost completely transforms into one, telling Emma that she needs to use the Hexoren to reverse the spell, and warns Emma of something very important she has to tell her, before she completely transforms into a monkey.
7	7	"Monkey Business II"	Arturo Manuitt & Leonardo Galavis	Catharina Ledeboer	January 9, 2014	107	1.78
Nurse Lily is now a monkey, and Daniel knocks on the door and asks for band-aids for Mac. This leads Emma to stall him but Daniel also asks Emma to go to the beach with him and his friends later, which she accepts. Andi accidentally loses the monkey when the door opens. Katie also overhears Daniel telling the Sharks that he heard a monkey in the nurse's office, and tells Maddie her spell worked. Emma finds Monkey Lily again. Later at the beach, Daniel is waiting for Emma when Maddie shows up, using magic to turn her phone into Emma's. She sends a text to Daniel that she is too busy for him right now, leaving Daniel hurt and confused. Back at Emma's house, she uses the Hexoren to attempt to turn Lily back into a human again, but she has no success. Emma goes to school the next day while Andi fakes being sick to watch Monkey Lily. Emma goes to Maddie and confronts her, telling her to turn Nurse Lily back into a human again, but Maddie refuses unless Emma trades her the Hexoren. Emma tells her Lily wouldn't want her to make that deal, so Maddie attempts to cast a spell to make the Hexoren appear in her hand, but it fails. Maddie is also convinced she is The Chosen One because Emma has been unable to undo her spell. Andi's mom figures out that Andi is faking her sickness, and is forced to go to school with Monkey Lily. Emma apologizes to Daniel about the beach mishap, but quickly runs off when she sees Andi with Monkey Lily. Tony asks Daniel if he can ask Emma out, and Daniel tells him to go for it. At lunch, Maddie finds Ursula undercover so she can meet up with Francisco, but Ursula tells Maddie she is only trying to hatch a plan to steal the Hexoren from Emma. As Sophie has lost Monkey Lily again, The Panthers and Emma and Andi are now quickly trying to find her. Diego attempts to use his abilities to impress a girl and fails, and later accidentally freezes Coach Julio's water bottle solid, causing him to become suspicious. Ursula and Francisco agree to host a make-your-own pizza book club night at Francisco's house. Emma and Andi find Monkey Lily in her office, but she escapes into the hallway, causing all of Iridium High to evacuate. Coach Julio tells the Principal that Diego might be a kanay. Emma and Andi find Monkey Lily in the cafeteria, but Francisco has already called animal control and they are heading in that direction. Andi pushes Emma to the cafeteria to undo the spell while she stalls Francisco.
8	8	"Mac-sic-cle"	Arturo Manuitt & Leonardo Galavis	Catharina Ledeboer	January 10, 2014	108	2.46
While Andi distracts animal control and Francisco, Emma concentrates and successfully turns Lily back into a human, but Coach Julio sees her cast the spell. As Andi, Francisco and animal control walk in, a now-human Nurse Lily says she has been in the cafeteria and hasn't seen the monkey. Everyone gets sent home early because of the monkey, and Maddie confronts Ursula about wanting to date her enemy's dad. Ursula says that she is only going over there to steal the Hexoren. Katie shows Maddie Miss Information's blog, showing that Lily is now a human again. Ursula also learns of Maddie turning Nurse Lily into a monkey, and is very surprised that Emma was able to undo the spell. Maddie has a new plan, and tells Ursula to call her friends and host book club at their house instead. Nurse Lily is sending a report to the Witches Council about Maddie being out of control, and is shocked that Coach Julio saw Emma undo the spell. Because Ursula has invited Daniel's parents to her book club, she pays Emma to babysit The Terrible Three. The Terrible Three set up a prank for Maddie, assuming that she was going to be their babysitter, but the prank accidentally is set off on Mr. Miller instead. Daniel confronts his siblings and they apologize to Emma. Meanwhile, Coach Julio tells Principal Torres that the monkey was actually Nurse Lily, and that Emma turned her back into human. In retaliation for Nurse Lily sneaking into the Principal's office, Julio decides to investigate her office. Daniel gets Mac to watch The Terrible Three while he walks Emma home. While Ursula is hosting book club at the Van Pelt house, Maddie and Katie have sneaked into Emma's room in search for the Hexoren, and eventually they find it, but the Hexoren starts moving rapidly in an attempt to save itself. Emma and Daniel arrive back at Emma's house during this, and Maddie overhears Daniel about to confess his love for Emma. Enraged, Maddie casts a spell to make him say the opposite of whatever he is trying to say, causing him to insult Emma and call her ugly, and that she was a terrible babysitter. Emma is shocked and makes Daniel leave. Maddie successfully steals the Hexoren, but hides it from Ursula because she wants to understand the book first. Diego continues to show off his abilities to Mac, and Coach Julio and Nurse Lily have another suspicious interaction with each other. Emma confides into Andi about what happened, but Andi states it is very unlike him to do such thing. Principal Torres tells Emma she needs to speak to her again, but Nurse Lily interrupts and tells Emma she needs to have her yearly check-up in her office, saving her from the Principal. Nurse Lily warns Emma that there is someone very evil after her, but forgets who it is. Daniel tells Tony that everything he says is the opposite of what he means by communicating with a whiteboard, but Tony thinks that it is about him liking Emma, and Daniel accidentally gives Tony permission to ask Emma out. Maddie also gets Daniel to get back together with her. That night while at a sleepover, Emma and Andi discover that the Hexoren is missing and realize Maddie stole it. While Diego is closing up The Seven with Mac, he accidentally freezes Mac solid into an icicle.
9	9	"I Said, Upside Down"	Arturo Manuitt & Leonardo Galavis	Catharina Ledeboer	January 13, 2014	109	1.90
Emma and Andi continue to frantically search for the Hexoren, but fail in finding it. Maddie begins to use the Hexoren but continues to hide it from Ursula. She also tells Ursula about the spell she cast on Daniel. Daniel's dad helps Daniel finally say what he means again, and he can finally speak normally again. Andi and Emma begin to form a plan to steal the Hexoren back. The Hexoren acts very aggressive with Maddie, but she manages to jot a few spells down from the book. At school, Diego confides to Coach Julio about what happened with Mac, and Julio helps Diego unfreeze Mac. Julio also warns Diego to be careful with his powers and to not tell anyone he has them. Nurse Lily reveals spells don't work on the Hexoren. Maddie tells Andi her and Daniel are back together. While Emma and Andi are in an empty classroom and Tony walks in, Maddie uses magic to show Emma the new spells she's been learning, and turns the classroom upside down. Diego and Daniel are both confused with each other: the former for getting back together with Maddie and the latter for turning Mac into an ice sculpture. Coach Julio tells Principal Torres that Diego is a kanay, and she requests to see Diego in her office tomorrow. Maddie finally undos the spell she did on the classroom, and Emma has no choice but to tell Tony the truth about how she is a witch. Daniel tells Maddie that they need to talk, but Maddie makes up a lie about Sophie being sick to avoid it. Nurse Lily tells Emma she has to wipe Tony's memory. Ursula sneaks into Maddie's room and finds the Hexoren, and she is furious. Daniel sneaks into Emma's room, apologizes for how he acted, and Emma realizes Maddie cast a spell on him. He finally asks Emma out, but Emma tells Daniel she has to tell him the truth.
10	10	"I-Guana Dance With You"	Arturo Manuitt & Leonardo Galavis	Catharina Ledeboer	January 14, 2014	110	1.77
Before Emma can tell Daniel the truth, Nurse Lily interrupts and gets Daniel to leave. Diego and Mac go to Daniel's house to help set up for Tommy's Birthday party, but Diego accidentally heats up Melanie's cookies and him and Mac eat them to hide the evidence. Ursula confronts Maddie about having the Hexoren, and tells Maddie that she needs to understand how serious having the book is and to not keep secrets from her. Nurse Lily tells Emma she only came to her house to help her steal the Hexoren and warns her that she can't be honest with everyone. Emma teleports Lily to the pool and Julio sees. Daniel finally stands up to Maddie, and tells her that he'd rather date Emma than her. The Terrible Three set off their oatmeal prank on Maddie as they were hiding in a locker nearby at the time. While Andi and Tony scuffle over Tony's notes that he's trying to give to Emma, the book accidentally gets whacked onto Diego's nose, making an icicle appear from the bottom. Mac quickly takes him to Nurse Lily. Maddie uses a spell to return her appearance to normal and attempts to cast a spell on Emma while she is talking to Daniel, but gets interrupted by Principal Torres, who takes her to her office. The Principal asks Maddie for information about Emma, but continues to lose patience with her and turns her into a frog, until Maddie lies and tells the Principal that Emma is The Chosen One and has the Hexoren. Daniel invites Emma to Tommy's Birthday party. Nurse Lily pulls the icicle from Diego's nose, and Coach Julio quickly sends him to practice. Coach Julio discovers Nurse Lily knows Diego is a kanay and he grows even more suspicious of her. Emma meets Tony at the Seven and appears to have wiped his memory. Nurse Lily tells Julio she is a powerless witch and reveals she knows the Principal is a witch. Julio also tells Lily that he is adopted. Principal Torres uses magic to spy on their conversation. Emma and Andi decide to go to Tommy's Birthday party and to not worry about stealing the Hexoren tonight. Daniel calls Maddie on his laptop and gets Tommy and Robert to apologize to her. He still refuses to get back together with Maddie. Maddie grows furious and without thinking, casts a spell on Daniel to turn him into a lizard. She quickly pulls back however, but the Panthers and herself are unsure if the spell actually worked, so they sneak into Daniel's garage to see if he is still human as it is the last place they saw him on the call with Maddie. They find the iguana that was meant to be a Birthday gift for Tommy, and Maddie thinks her spell actually worked.
11	11	"I-Guana You Back"	Arturo Manuitt & Leonardo Galavis	Catharina Ledeboer	January 15, 2014	111	2.19
Maddie and the Panthers take the iguana back to Maddie's house, believing it is Daniel. Katie warns Maddie that she can't leave Daniel as a reptile forever. Tommy and Robert look for the iguana in their garage, and find Emma inside as she has been looking for Daniel. As the door was already left open before Tommy and Robert walked in, they believe Emma opened the door and let the iguana escape. Maddie fakes being sick in order to spend a day with the iguana as she wants to spend a day with "Daniel" so he'll get back together with her, quickly becoming very attached. Emma is worried Daniel thinks Emma let the iguana escape because he has not been answering her. Sophie finds another lizard in Maddie's room. Emma gets an alert from Miss Information stating that Daniel and Maddie are back together, but Daniel walks over and denies this entirely. Daniel invites Andi and Emma to join his search party for the iguana. Ursula finds out that Maddie turned "Daniel" into an iguana and forces Maddie to change him back immediately. Maddie is convinced that she and Daniel are now back together but Ursula tells her she can't date a reptile. Andi organizes team assignments: Mac and Tony, herself and Diego, and Emma and Daniel. Maddie attempts to cast a spell from the Hexoren to turn "Daniel"-iguana back into human, but she accidentally stumbles over and her spell hits the lizard Sophie had noticed in her room earlier, and he becomes human instead. Emma and Daniel continue to grow closer together while searching for the iguana, holding hands in the process. Andi thinks that someone may have stolen the iguana. The Panthers see Miss Information's alert: a picture of Daniel and Emma searching for an iguana, and Maddie freaks out. Emma and Andi recap Tommy's Birthday Party, and it leads to the fact that Emma and Daniel last left the door open when exiting the garage while the iguana was still there. Maddie claims she is going to send the iguana to a "special new home." The same group has another search party, and when Emma and Daniel arrive back to her house the same day, and when Daniel leaves Emma finds the iguana on her couch, confused. Daniel comes back into Emma's because he forgot his jacket, and is shocked when he sees Emma with iguana. In Maddie's room, Sophie sees a boy camouflaged in Maddie's room. When he uncamouflaged, Maddie and the Panthers freak out and run into Maddie's closet.
12	12	"I Heart Beau"	Arturo Manuitt & Leonardo Galavis	Catharina Ledeboer	January 16, 2014	112	1.95
Daniel is furious with Emma as he now believes she stole the iguana, even seeing its bed and food bowl (which are from Maddie's). Emma tries to convince Daniel she is just as confused as he is but refuses to believe her and takes the iguana back to Tommy. Sophie instantly bonds with the lizard-boy, and begs Maddie to keep him for the time-being. Maddie thinks it'll be bizarre to have him in school, but Katie says that if he's with Sophie, no one will be suspicious. Daniel returns home and gives iguana to Tommy. Emma invites Andi over, and they both realize Maddie framed Emma by sending the iguana to her house with Maria Conchita's dog bed (which is Sophie's) and a food bowl. Emma grows very angry and starts turning everything into her house into flowers. Maddie gets angry at the Hexoren and it bites her nose, and Sophie names the lizard-boy Beau. Maddie comes over to Daniel's house and tells him Emma stole the iguana. Julio tells Diego about the origin of his powers, that he is a Churi Kanay (Son of Fire) and that he is the last left of his generation. Emma tells Daniel that Maddie put the iguana in her house, but Daniel thinks not even Maddie would go that far. Maddie walks over and her & Emma begin bickering, with Maddie telling Daniel Emma just doesn't want them to get back together. Emma almost confesses to Daniel that she's a witch again, but is interrupted by Tony. Having witnessed the whole thing, he makes up a lie that he actually found the iguana and dropped it off at Emma's house so she could give it to him, as Emma had already felt bad for leaving the door open earlier. This makes Daniel feel very guilty for accusing Emma and Emma very appreciative to Tony. Nurse Lily pulls Andi aside and is very frustrated as her and Emma have been doing nothing: not training magic or getting the Hexoren back. Lily tells Andi that Emma is in serious danger, as someone even more evil and threatening than Maddie is after Emma. Andi agrees to talk to Emma about this. Tony begins to flirt more with Emma. Diego and Mac have their first falling out when Mac accuses Diego of thinking he's so cool now for having superpowers, and Diego even goes as far to say he can't show all of his powers to Mac because he doesn't have any. Tensions continue when Andi and Emma have their first major fight: Andi tells Emma she has to be more careful and that she could lose her magic, but Emma doesn't think it would be so bad. Andi grows increasingly frustrated that Emma isn't owning up to who she is or fighting for her powers at all, telling her she was given a special gift and that many witches are counting on her. Emma tells Andi she didn't ask for any of this, but Andi storms off. The Terrible Three give Emma a thank you for finding iguana. Ursula enrolls Beau into Iridium High. Katie witnesses Emma approaching Andi, but Andi walking off and not talking to her. She tells Maddie this, and they seek an opportunity to mess with Andi. Daniel tells Diego he is going to apologize to Emma and invite her to the beach volleyball game coming up. Principal Torres approaches Diego, revealing she knows about his powers to him. Before Daniel can ask Emma to the beach volleyball game, Tony does first. Maddie and the Panthers approach Andi in an empty classroom, and Maddie tells Andi she needs friends like them. She casts a spell on Andi to turn her into a panther as Andi attempts to run out of the classroom, and it works, officially turning Andi into a panther.
13	13	"Pantherized"	Arturo Manuitt & Leonardo Galavis	Catharina Ledeboer	January 17, 2014	113	2.23
Panther Andi is horrified by her appearance and asks for a new outfit, and is completely brainwashed by Maddie, ready to take down Emma. Emma accepts Tony's offer to the Beach Ball while Daniel watches, sad and jealous. In the cafeteria, Nurse Lily overhears Principal Torres say the first thing she is going to do when she steals The Chosen One's powers is eliminate all children, and remembers how when she saw a frog in the Principal's office that it was actually a teacher. Panther Andi begins to get a lot more attention than Maddie, and Maddie gets slightly jealous. Sophie asks Mac to spend time with Beau so he has more friends. Emma is horrified by Andi's new look and Andi ends her friendship with Emma, claiming she doesn't even have the Hexoren and barely even practices her magic. Emma is extremely angry with Maddie and accidentally causes stuffed animals to fall out of her locker. Principal Torres is convinced Maddie or Emma is The Chosen One and knows Nurse Lily was sent by the Witches Council to protect The Chosen One. Nurse Lily agrees to train Emma more more, and reveals to her that her biggest villain is not Maddie, but Principal Torres. Andi tries to open Maddie's trunk, but Maddie warns her not to open it. Emma practices spells at home, and Tony shows up. Coach Julio meets up with Diego in a private spot to help him control his Kanay abilities. He also warns Diego to stay away from Witches. Mac tells Daniel that he should ask Maddie to Beach Ball to make Emma jealous. Emma and Tony practice magic and have fun together at her house, while Maddie uses magic from the Hexoren to create fun stuff for her and the Panthers. Tony helps Emma form a plan to turn Andi back to her old self and to steal the Hexoren back. He shows up at Maddie's house with a magic box and tells Ursula he is there to work on his science project with Maddie. Despite Maddie not remembering this, Sophie says it may be because she skipped class. While Tony is explaining the project to Maddie, Emma sneaks upstairs into Maddie's room and finds the Hexoren. Andi is suspicious of the big magic box Tony brought, and also goes upstairs. She finds Emma in Maddie's room with the Hexoren, and calls her out for it. Emma tells Andi that this isn't the true her, and casts a spell to turn Andi back into her old self, and Andi screams for Maddie in the process. It works, and Andi is back to normal, but Maddie has now come upstairs after hearing Andi call for her. Emma quickly hides and Andi struggles on what to do next when Maddie shows up, and notices Andi doesn't walk in her high heels correctly anymore.
14	14	"Walk Like A Panther"	Arturo Manuitt & Leonardo Galavis	Catharina Ledeboer	January 21, 2014	114	2.15
Andi pretends to still be a panther to Maddie and Maddie starts to hear noises under her bed. Andi tries to stall her and Emma quickly casts a spell to teleport her out. The spell takes Emma to the pool, and Daniel is there swimming and finds her. Andi tells Maddie she has a made-up witch disease called "Witchanoia" where she sees and hears things that aren't actually there. Andi says they should bring the Hexoren downstairs and look for a cure, but Maddie insists it stays put. Daniel returns Emma to her house, and isn't making a good impression to Francisco. Ursula tells Maddie she has to turn Beau back into a lizard soon, but Maddie says she feels too bad because of how happy Sophie is with him. Andi and Emma officially make up and Andi tells Emma she only wanted her to take magic more seriously so she doesn't lose her powers. Emma makes Andi continue to play as a panther at school the next day in order for them to steal the Hexoren back. Emma updates Tony on everything going on and Tony tells Emma they should hide away the night of the eclipse. Maddie arranges for Andi to do her first smoothie smuther in Emma's locker, and when she refuses, Maddie realizes Andi is no longer a panther and is an impostor. She attempts to cast a spell on her, but is interrupted by Nurse Lily. Daniel asks Maddie to the Beach Ball in front of Emma, and she seems upset. Andi calls Maddie on her laptop and reveals she is holding Beau captive, and threatens to have Emma turn him back into a lizard and release him back to the wild. She tells Maddie she will only release him in exchange for the Hexoren, and Maddie agrees to this deal. Emma still hasn't told Lily that she didn't actually erase Tony's memory. Andi tells Emma that Beau isn't actually a real boy and is just a lizard Maddie turned into a boy. Maddie agrees to meet up with Andi at The Seven to make the exchange. Emma feels guilty about having to trade a person for a book, but Andi convinces Emma that Beau really actually isn't a real person because she heard Ursula tell Maddie that she should change him back into a lizard. Maddie shows Andi that she actually does have the Hexoren, but demands where Beau is. Unexpectedly, Emma goes to Maddie's house with Beau and returns him to Sophie. Beau tells Sophie that he misses being a lizard and wants to return to his family. Andi has Maddie talk to Beau on the phone (actually is Tony) but Maddie knows that Beau actually can't talk, and almost turns Andi into tissues before being interrupted by Daniel. Sophie tells Emma to turn Beau back into a lizard, but Katie thinks they should just wait for Maddie. Ursula tells Katie she is confident Emma can't undo Maddie's spell. As Emma begins to cast a spell, Maddie interrupts and tells everyone that they can't trust Emma and attempts to cast a spell to send her far away, only for Emma to cast a counter spell, causing a spell collision between the two witches.
15	15	"Beach Ball"	Arturo Manuitt & Leonardo Galavis	Catharina Ledeboer	January 22, 2014	115	2.15
Ursula gets Emma and Maddie to release their spells at the same time. Maddie thinks that Emma isn't powerful enough to turn Beau back into a human, but Katie thinks she is. Maddie pulls out the Hexoren and her and Emma start pulling back and forth on it, until it suddenly floats and spins around crazily in the air, and no one is able to catch it. It goes outside and Ursula tries to get it, but it flies away. Emma leaves, believing the Hexoren is going to return to its rightful home. Andi tells Emma that it is at least good news that Maddie and the Principal also don't know where the Hexoren is either. Maddie turns Beau back into a lizard, and Sophie says goodbye to him before releasing him back into the wild. At the Beach Ball, Miss Information begins reporting on everyone who arrives, calling Emma and Tony Iridium High's "newest item" and also highlights Maddie and Daniel's arrival. Diego gets frustrated at his sister and takes away her camera. Instead of going to Beach Ball, Andi meets up with Nurse Lily in her office to research about Principal Torres and her origins. The volleyball game begins, and Maddie and Emma cast spells on Tony that affect his performance. Nurse Lily tells Andi that she is appointing her as Emma's guardian. At match point in the volleyball game, Gigi takes her camera back from Diego and also his sandals, phone and tablet. This causes Diego to get very angry, and when serving the ball, he shatters it into pieces. Coach Julio covers for Diego and tells everyone he accidentally filled the ball with the wrong tank. Meanwhile, Maddie grows suspicious of Diego and believes he is some sort of male witch with powers. Coach Julio warns Diego that he has to control his temper so it doesn't affect his powers. Maddie introduces herself to Diego, despite them being classmates for awhile. She asks Diego what spell he used, but he is confused. When she tells him she also has powers, he thinks she's a kanay. Nurse Lily tells Andi that the principal is much worse than Maddie. Emma is suspicious that Maddie and Diego are talking. She later meets up with Daniel and the two begin flirting with each other again, and Daniel tells Emma he isn't back together with Maddie and Emma tells Daniel her and Tony are just friends. Maddie tells Diego she's a witch, but he doesn't believe her. They both agree to prove to each other what they are, but Coach Julio interrupts Diego as he is about to make a fireball. Nurse Lily and Andi print out a bunch of old photographs of the Principal from different decades under different aliases. They find her photo from the yearbook and deduce that they are all the same person. Nurse Lily tells Andi she needs to go to the Witches Council and report to them about this. At the Beach Ball afterparty at the Seven, Maddie casts a spell to make Daniel's guitar appear so he can perform. He is nervous, but agrees once he sees Emma. Nurse Lilly reveals that the portal to the Witches Council is in between lockers, and she is about to depart.
16	16	"Lily Frog"	Arturo Manuitt & Leonardo Galavis	Catharina Ledeboer	January 23, 2014	116	2.22
Nurse Lily tells Andi that they don't let non-witches enter the portal to the Witches Council, and leaves her behind for the time being. Andi sends a text to Emma about Lily going to the Witches Council, and the Principal overhears. At the Seven, Daniel sings a love song that is clearly about Emma. Tony watches jealously, while Maddie thinks the song is about her. When arriving back at Maddie's, Daniel tells her that they won't be hanging out anymore because he is romantically interested in Emma, not her. Maddie's face turns tomato red and Daniel leaves. Principal Torres begins threatening Andi to tell her where the entrance to the Witches Council is, but Andi keeps stalling, so The Principal turns her hands webbed, and threatens to her into a cricket to feed to her frogs. The Hexoren returns back to Emma's house, but quickly leaves to rescue Andi from the Principal. Ursula tells Maddie that she is her Guardian and that they need to get ready for the Eclipse. Sophie begins stalking Diego because Maddie told her to "keep an eye" on him. The Principal calls Diego to her office and tells him that she knows he is a kanay. Andi and Emma meet up in private at school and Andi reveals to Emma that she has the Hexoren, and also that the Principal is a big threat. The Principal tells Diego that he can confide in her about being a kanay anytime; Sophie camouflages in the wall similar to how Beau did and spies on their conversation. In class, Daniel talks to Emma and Andi about the Eclipse and Emma starts to freak out that he knows about it, before being reminded by Andi that it actually is a real event. Nurse Lily returns from the Witches Council and Julio sees the lockers move. Lily admits to him that she is in fact a Guardian. Daniel begins to ask Emma to hang out at the Eclipse and Maddie interrupts, thinking Daniel is about to ask her out. Furious, Maddie casts a spell on Daniel's voice to make it sound like he swallowed helium right before him and Andi's oral presentation. Nurse Lily and Julio talk, and he reveals to her that the Principal knows she's a Guardian and about Diego being a kanay. Julio also tells her that they know who The Chosen One is, Emma. In order to buy Emma time, Lily lies to Julio and tells him he is incorrect. He realizes it must actually be Maddie and leaves. Nurse Lily tells Andi that the council took her off of Emma's case, and that she is leaving Iridium High because she no longer under the council's protection. Lily tells Andi that the Principal is A Chosen One and that Emma also is, but it is very complicated. Their conversation is interrupted by the Principal, and Andi quickly hides. Nurse Lily tells the Principal she told the council about who she is, and they believe the Principal is the Chosen One and asked Lily to stay away from her because of that. The Principal now believes Maddie has her powers and that she will get them back. Lily tells the Principal she will stop her, but the Principal turns her into a frog before she can do anything.
17	17	"Witches' Flu"	Arturo Manuitt & Leonardo Galavis	Catharina Ledeboer	January 27, 2014	117	2.09
Andi is horrified by what she has just witnessed and takes Nurse Lily's guardian kit and exits the office. Emma casts a spell to make Daniel's voice sound back to the way it used to, and he can speak normally again. She sneezes afterwards, and jellybeans appear in her hands. Emma is later sick in bed, and every time she sneezes a different effect occurs, such as jungle themed items in her room or bubbles. Andi tells Emma that the Principal is also A Chosen One and will do anything for her powers, and that Lily is a frog. Ursula continues to explain to Maddie about what being her Guardian means, but Maddie is annoyed that she keeps making it about herself and just wants Ursula to make sure she is The Chosen One. Iridium High's Western themed school dance is being held on the Eclipse, and Tony lies to Miss Information that he and Emma will be attending the dance together in order to stir up drama between her and Daniel. Daniel shows up at Emma's house while she's sick and brings her chicken soup. However while they continue to talk, Emma's sneezing causes bizarre effects on Daniel: his eyebrows become hairy and large and his shirt becomes one from Francisco's closet. Emma tries to undo it but her spells do not work because she is sick. When Francisco arrives home he is furious and tells Emma that she can't see Daniel anymore. The Principal asks to see Maddie in her office and lies to her, telling her that she is actually her Guardian and not Ursula, and also tells her that she is The Chosen One. Maddie now believes that Ursula has tricked her so she could steal her powers. The Principal also asks Maddie to obtain the Hexoren again and also to get Diego to join forces with them. The Terrible Three tell Daniel that they think Maddie is behind what happened to his eyebrows. Maddie attempts to ask Diego to go to the dance with her but he refuses as he was told to stay away from witches. The Terrible Three sneak into the school to spy on Emma. Sophie mistakes Daniel's unibrow for a squirrel and starts attacking him and tells Miss Information. When she attacks Daniel again, Emma, now feeling much better, reverses his eyebrows back to normal, but the spell also accidentally hits Katie and removes her eyebrows entirely. Andi realizes how strange it is that the school dance is on the same night as the Eclipse. Daniel asks Emma to go to the dance with him and as much as she wants to, declines because of the Eclipse. Andi and Tony have a conversation in the hallway and Andi tells him that she brings the Hexoren to school because she needs it with her at all times in order to help Emma practice possible battles she may have to face at the Eclipse. Once Andi and Tony leave, it is revealed that Katie and The Terrible Three were spying on their conversation from opposite ends of the locker.
18	18	"Hexoren Squared"	Arturo Manuitt & Leonardo Galavis	Catharina Ledeboer	January 28, 2014	118	2.11
The Terrible Three tell Katie what happened to her eyebrows and she is horrified. She also accuses them of spying on her. Tommy farts next to Katie and they run off. Emma tells Daniel that she really can't go to the dance, but it's not because of Tony. Katie tells Maddie what she overheard, that Emma, Andi and Tony are planning to steal her powers, and also that they have the Hexoren. Miss Information is dismayed that nobody is attending the school dance because of the theme, so Mac proposes that they switch the theme to anime instead. Andi tells Emma that both her and the Principal are Chosen Ones and that they both share powers until one of them claims them all during the Eclipse. Andi also says that in the Hexoren, the Chosen One has a star-shaped birthmark, but Emma hasn't found it on herself yet. Melanie is in the bathroom stall and overhears their entire conversation. Andi goes to the Van Pelt house to talk to Ursula about the Eclipse. The Terrible Three tell Daniel that there is a magic book Emma, Andi and Tony are trying to keep hidden, that Emma is chosen for something, and that everything goes down the night of the Eclipse. They also tell Daniel that Emma is a witch, but he refuses to believe it. Andi tells Ursula that Maddie isn't The Chosen One and warns her that The Principal is an evil witch and is after both Emma and Maddie, showing her the photographs from Nurse Lily's research. Ursula thinks Maddie wouldn't listen to the Principal over her. In Nurse Lily's office, Emma is there and Maddie shows up, and they begin fighting over the Hexoren again. Emma lets the book go and water starts spilling on it, causing the Hexoren to duplicate rapidly, freaking both of them out. All of the duplicated Hexorens are exact copies of the book. Emma is confused that Maddie thinks she's The Chosen One. The Principal shows up and tells Emma that all of the copies of the Hexoren belong to Maddie. Gigi sees Andi attempting to use Nurse Lily's magic kit and becomes suspicious. The Principal has Maddie shred all of the fake copies of the Hexoren because there is only one real copy of the book. The Principal also tells Emma that she doesn't need her anymore because she knows Maddie is The Chosen One. Emma tries to warn Maddie that the Principal is using her, but she refuses to listen, with The Principal even saying she only turned Nurse Lily into a frog because she was going to help Emma take Maddie's powers. The Principal attempts to cast a spell to disintegrate Emma, but Maddie interrupts her and Emma ends in the pool. However, Maddie thinks the Principal actually killed Emma and runs off. The Principal takes one copy of the Hexoren, but the real one is revealed to still be hiding. Maddie tells Ursula that the Principal turned Emma into dust and that is all her fault. Ursula and Maddie go to Emma's house to mourn her loss, but Francisco is very confused. Emma wants to tell them that she is okay but Andi suggests that they go to their house and see if Maddie is hiding anything in her trunk. Diego and Mac sneak into the Principal's office to see if she has any information about Kanays, but instead find a hidden room in the back. Andi and Emma open Maddie's trunk and find a photo of Maddie and her dad when Maddie was a baby. They both feel awful and get ready to leave, but Daniel shows up and asks them what they are doing in Maddie's room. They are both left without an answer and Maddie also shows up, asking Daniel why he is there.
19	19	"Which Witch Is Which?"	Arturo Manuitt & Leonardo Galavis	Catharina Ledeboer	January 29, 2014	119	2.17
Daniel continues to stall Maddie so Andi and Emma can escape Maddie's room without being caught. Unfortunately, he gives her a music CD with his new song on it that he actually was planning to give to Emma, but had to make sure Maddie wouldn't see Emma and Andi in her room. Maddie accidentally steps on the picture of her and her dad as Andi and Emma left it out of her trunk. Diego and Mac roam around the hidden room and find information about Witches and Kanays hating each other, and finds a picture of the Principal using Diego to steal Maddie's powers at the Eclipse. Maddie took a copy of a Hexoren and Katie tells Maddie Emma most likely is the one who took the picture out of her trunk. Emma returns back to her house and Ursula is relieved to find her safe and sound. Maddie plays the CD Daniel gave to her in her laptop, but at the end of the song there is a message where Daniel says Emma's name at the end, dedicating the song to her. Maddie is furious. Diego overhears the Principal and Julio talking, and feels extremely betrayed by Julio when he hears him agreeing to always be loyal to the Principal during the Eclipse which includes making Diego disintegrate. Daniel comes to Emma's house and is confused about her being at Maddie's house, especially when Emma answers very vaguely as to why she was there. However the Principal shows up and they can't finish their conversation, so Daniel hides underneath the kitchen table. The Principal tells Emma that she was able to disappear without even using words, and concludes that she is actually The Chosen One, not Maddie, and that she is planning to take her powers. Daniel sneezes underneath the table and Emma quickly casts a spell that teleports him to the pool. The Principal discovers that Emma's weakness is her protectiveness of her friends, and teleports out. Ursula sees Maddie with the Hexoren and is angry that she hid it from her again. Maddie tells Ursula that she isn't her real Guardian. Daniel shows up at Emma's house again and she finally tells him the truth about everything, and how she is a Witch, and Daniel is freaked out. The Sharks show up at Daniel's house and tell him that Diego is a Kanay and that Maddie and the Principal are also Witches. They tell him that the Principal is planning to use Diego to take either Emma or Maddie's powers at the Eclipse, which will make Diego poof into dust. Andi is over at Emma's house and Emma is painting her toenails. On the back of her foot, Andi discovers Emma's star-shaped birthmark, confirming that she is The Chosen One. At school the day of the Eclipse, The Principal tells Maddie that she isn't The Chosen One and Maddie finally understands that she was tricking her all along to possibly steal her powers if she was the Chosen One. The Principal tells Maddie that Emma is the Chosen One and that she either joins her or becomes a frog. Emma and Andi realize that they need to ask Maddie for help. Maddie tells Emma that she should help her because everyone is in danger, but Maddie refuses to help unless Emma stops associating herself with Daniel. Emma refuses so Maddie kicks her out. At Emma's house later, Daniel shows up at her window and gives her a big hug.
20	20	"The Chosen One"	Arturo Manuitt & Leonardo Galavis	Catharina Ledeboer	January 30, 2014	120	2.60
Daniel tells Emma that he is going to help her and that he won't let anything bad happen to her. After school, the Sharks meet up to set up a trap meant for the Principal. Daniel leaves to meet up with them but tells Emma to stay put. The Sharks storm into the Principal's office with water balloons. The Principal attempts to turn Tony into a frog but Julio saves him, and his hands are turned into frog hands similar to Andi's. The Sharks attack the Principal with the water balloons and she seemingly melts into the floor, and they all think she is finally defeated. With her gone, Emma shows up and turns all of the frogs back into humans, beginning with Nurse Lily. The school dance has begun, and the Panthers arrive with Diego being Maddie's date. She asks him to get her something to drink. Andi and Emma haven't arrived at the dance yet because they are waiting for Daniel. They get a call from the Principal, who is revealed to be in an empty theater with Daniel being held captive in quicksand in order to lure Emma to steal her powers. Diego goes to the back to get Maddie a drink, opens a door and magically disappears inside. Andi tells Tony, Mac, Maddie and Katie that the Principal took Daniel to the theater, and shortly after Sophie tells them that Diego disappeared into the theater. Everyone agrees to go to the theater to help them out. The Principal ties Diego up and Emma shows up at the theater, and the transfer of powers between the Principal and Emma begins, and Diego begins flashing rapidly. A large forcefield appears around them. The remaining Sharks and Panthers show up at this time, and Daniel uses the Hexoren to escape from the quicksand and break through the forcefield, tackling the Principal and interrupting the transfer of powers. Everyone tries to escape but the Principal begins casting spells rapidly over and over again. Emma tries to cast a spell on her but her powers have weakened greatly. Diego freezes the Principal for a little bit, but she later asks Maddie to join her, so Emma sneaks over to meet up with her. Andi and the rest of the Sharks stall the Principal by throwing rocks at her. Emma convinces Maddie to join forces with her to defeat the Principal because both of them have had to adjust significantly to being a Witch and that both of them got through it with the help of their friends. When a spell almost hits Katie and Sophie, Maddie finally agrees to help defeat the Principal. The Hexoren hovers over with a spell that both of them should use to defeat the Principal. They cast it at the same time while holding hands and the Principal finally vanishes. While the Principal is finally defeated, Emma and Maddie have both lost their powers. Daniel performs his song again and invites Emma on stage. They kiss and finally become a couple. At school sometime later, Emma tells Daniel that her powers still haven't come back yet, but Daniel tells her he will always like her for who she is. Emma attempts to cast a spell to fill the hallway with flowers, but it seemingly doesn't work. After Daniel leaves though, flowers finally start appearing, and Emma still has her powers after all, ending the season.

=== Season 2 (2014) ===
- Filming for this season began on March 31, 2014, as confirmed on Twitter by various cast members.
- Rahart Adams appears in this season as Jax Novoa.
- Tyler Alvarez is absent for one episode, "The Emma Squad".

No. overall	No. in season	Title	Directed by	Written by	Original air date	Production code	US viewers (millions)
21	1	"Jax of Hearts"	Clayton Boen	Catharina Ledeboer	July 7, 2014	201	N/A
Summer is over, and a new school year has begun at Iridium High. Emma and Daniel are still a couple, but she has decided to keep her powers a secret from him. It is revealed Tony has left Iridium to attend a Magic Academy, and Mac moved to Texas because his dad got transferred. Diego is wearing mittens to school because he is still having trouble controlling his powers. With the Principal gone, Francisco has now taken over as Iridium High's Principal. Ever since she lost her powers, Maddie has fallen into a depression state and refuses to leave her bed as she wants her powers back. It is revealed that Maddie's powers actually went to Ursula. The Terrible Three plan to prank Francisco because they think he is mean to Daniel. Meanwhile a new student named Jax has just transferred to Iridium High, and has magic powers. Francisco assigns Emma to show him around school. Nurse Lily tells Andi that the Witches Council is very upset that the Magic Realm was exposed to humans and that they could come out to the human world. Daniel tells Diego that all summer he tried to impress Francisco but with no success, but is still desperate to win him over. While touring around the school, Jax thinks Emma is asking her out to lunch so she feels bad and invites him to sit herself, Andi and Daniel. When the Hexoren pops out of Emma's locker, Jax spys on them. Katie and Sophie introduce themselves to Jax and Katie lies and says she is head panther to look more popular. Miss Information sends off a cute new student alert to everyone at Iridium High and interviews Jax, clearly swooned by him. She also posts about how Emma and Jax were "canoodling" while Emma was giving him a school tour, but Emma finds that ridiculous. The Panthers show up at Maddie's house and Sophie accidentally tells Maddie that Katie is glad Maddie lost her powers because she wants to become the true leader of the Panthers. They also bring Maddie the emergency pink kit to improve Maddie's physical appearance. Nurse Lily tells Emma about The Fool Moon, a full moon that happens once every 20 years that makes witches go bonkers. Nurse Lily tells Emma she can't date Daniel anymore because the Witches Council forbids humans and witches dating. Emma tells Lily that if they really want her to stop seeing Daniel they will have to say it to her face. Maddie blames Emma for the reason why she has no powers and no Daniel and swears for revenge. The Terrible Three's prank on the water fountain works on Francisco, but Daniel is holding their equipment and Franciso believes Daniel to be responsible. Diego shows up at Maddie's house with her homework and flowers but Ursula is horrified because he is a Kanay. Jax finds Emma talking to her books and she leaves in a panic, leaving her wallet behind, which Jax takes. Later, Andi attempts to open the portal to the Witches Council and she does. All three members come out, looking for The Chosen One.
22	2	"Runaway Witch"	Clayton Boen	Catharina Ledeboer	July 8, 2014	202	N/A
The Witches' Council shows up at Emma's house and tries to convince Emma not to date Daniel, but she refuses. Later, Jax sees Emma cast a spell, knowing for sure know that she is a witch. Meanwhile, Diego tries to cheer Maddie up about losing her powers, but Katie convinces him to use his powers anytime Maddie casts a spell so she will think that her powers are back. Daniel tries to figure out if Emma has her powers back. One of the council members, Ramona, disappears and gets trapped, so the council chooses Lily to be the new member. Lily leaves and tells Emma that Desdemona will take her place and help her for the Fool Moon. Then, Jax sends a text to Emma telling her to meet him at the science lab, but he uses his powers to make it seem it came through Daniel's phone. The episode ends with Ramona being held hostage in a secret location with no one else around her.
23	3	"Love Pie Redux"	Clayton Boen	Catharina Ledeboer	July 9, 2014	203	N/A
Jax gets Emma in trouble by accident. When Jax makes mess with a beaker, Emma finds out he is a wizard, and he tries to talk to her "wizard to witch" and transports to the lunch room, not knowing Emma couldn't transport unless she wanted to end up at the pool. Katie, Sophie, and Diego try to convince Maddie that she has her powers back, by going to crazy lengths and trying to make it look like Maddie's spells worked, but Maddie finds out they were just pretending. Daniel asks Emma if she has her powers back. She lies to him again. Daniel admits he doesn't want Emma to have her powers back, afraid "it will ruin everything." Jax then offers to help her with her disappearing (transportation) spells. Meanwhile, Ursula makes a love pie for Francisco, who eats it. The Van Pelts are invited to the Alonso's house, where Ursula and Francisco announce that they are getting married and Maddie and Emma are going to be sisters.
24	4	"Powers by Proxy"	Clayton Boen	Catharina Ledeboer	July 10, 2014	204	N/A
Maddie and Emma agree that they need to work together to split their parents up, as they don't want to be sisters. Jax transforms himself into a spider to spy on Emma and Daniel's conversation, learning that Emma has not told Daniel she has her powers back. Jax gets Daniel in trouble by casting a spell to make Daniel's chocolate milk spill all over Mr. Alonso. Emma and Maddie stage a verbal fight over a locker to make their parents life "miserable", but it backfires. Jax shows up offering to help Emma look for clues. While Emma goes to change her clothes, Jax casts a spell on Daniel to get him in more trouble with Mr. Alonso, knowing that Mr. Alonso "doesn't like Daniel at all." Tommy and Rob Miller, Daniel's brothers, eat the same love pie Ursula gave to Francisco, and fall in love with Andi. Diego helps Maddie in everything and Maddie at the same time starts to realize she likes Diego, but they get in a fight after Diego refuses to steal someone's homework for Maddie's benefit. Jax races Daniel for tryouts to be the newest Shark, but Andi sees through Spell-O-Vision goggles that Jax cast a spell to make him swim faster.
25	5	"The Fool Moon"	Clayton Boen	Catharina Ledeboer & Gloria Shen	July 11, 2014	205	N/A
Jax beats Daniel in the swim race; then Andi confronts him about being a cheat, finding out he is a wizard, and threatens to report him to the Witches' Council. Daniel and Emma get in a huge fight after he accidentally insults Emma about being a witch. The next day, Diego tells Maddie that he forgives her for forcing him to be her proxy, but she laughs saying how she should be the one forgiving him for ditching her. Jax understands that something is wrong between Emma and Daniel, and casts a spell to make Emma fall, but it backfires when Daniel catches her in his arms, and they both immediately apologize to one another. Using the Spell-O-Vision goggles, Andi sees that someone cast a spell on the pie, realizing that is the reason why Francisco is in love with Ursula, and Tommy and Rob are in love with her. Then Emma breaks the spell on her dad, Tommy, and Rob. Desdemona gets a job at the school as the new gym teacher, and tells Emma that she knew her mother and that she helped her during a Fool Moon twenty years ago. Later, Desdemona is affected by the Fool Moon and turns vindictive.
26	6	"Daniel Who?"	Clayton Boen	Catharina Ledeboer & Gloria Shen	July 14, 2014	206	N/A
Emma and Jax accidentally wipe out Daniel's entire memory after Daniel sees Emma casting a spell, telling him the truth about her powers. Emma then tells Jax that she's going to ask the Council for help, but he begs her not to, knowing how the Council almost took his powers away once. When things go out of control, Emma asks Lily for help. Desdemona, still under the influence of the Fool Moon, gives Emma the reversal spell. Meanwhile, Diego tries to win Maddie's forgiveness. Later on, Emma gives Daniel his memory back after he says how she is familiar to him. Desdemona says to Ramona how she's going to destroy the magic realm to be the last witch standing.
27	7	"No Can Do"	Clayton Boen	Catharina Ledeboer	July 15, 2014	207	N/A
Emma has trouble controlling her powers during the Fool Moon, stating that it seems she lost the filter between her thoughts and her spells. Maddie and The Panthers are trying to figure out if Emma has her powers again. Jax wins second place in the swim meet after Daniel, and Emma is confused by this, realizing that Jax didn't use magic. Meanwhile, Diego discovers a new power that allows him to fuse with other things. The Panthers suspect Maddie likes Diego back.
28	8	"Werewolves in Siberia"	Clayton Boen	Catharina Ledeboer	July 16, 2014	208	1.71
After she refuses to break up with Daniel, Agamemnon sends Emma, along with Andi, to Siberia to teach her a lesson. Later, Emma realizes that Agamemnon has been casting spells on her to make her act crazy around Daniel so she won't want to be around him. Jax knocks over the trophy case making Principal Alonso think Daniel did it and forces him to join the school play. When Daniel shows up at Emma's house, Jax and Andi reverse the spell just in time for Emma to not make a fool out of herself again. Andi says how Jax might not be so bad, after he cheated at the swim competition, since he helped Emma out. Katie and Sophie are tired of Diego stealing Maddie's attention. Maddie asks Diego how she can find out if Emma has her powers back. Maddie then plans a slumber party to lure Emma to her house so they can "push" her into casting a spell. Sophie learns that Maddie's mom has Maddie's powers but Ursula tells her not to tell anyone.
29	9	"The No-Sleep Sleepover"	Clayton Boen	Catharina Ledeboer, Gloria Shen	July 18, 2014	209	N/A
Maddie tries multiple ways to make Emma cast a spell, but nothing works. Meanwhile Jax, Diego, and Daniel create a trap out of the T3's supply closet, during their "all nighter." Jax then suggests that they go use it on the girls. When Gigi plugs up her equipment for her live stream, she causes a power outage, and everyone sees Sophie with a zombie makeup and run; they then realizes the creature was Sophie when the boys use their trap to capture her. Diego gets jealous because Daniel remembers so much about Maddie. Emma learns that Maddie's mom has Maddie's powers.
30	10	"Outta Hand"	Clayton Boen	Catharina Ledeboer, Gloria Shen	July 21, 2014	210	N/A
Emma learns how to cast spells without words. Maddie wants her powers back, but needs a conduit, so Sophie and Katie trick Diego into being the conduit by telling him there's a way do it without being turned to ashes. Jax convinces Emma to skip school, but she gets detention. Jax reveals to Emma that he used a cloning spell to skip classes without being caught.
31	11	"Double Trouble"	Clayton Boen	Catharina Ledeboer	July 22, 2014	211	N/A
Maddie shows she cares for Diego. Meanwhile, Emma learns a cloning spell from Jax and makes a clone of herself to go to her dad's Math Convention, while she goes on her anniversary date with Daniel. When cloned Emma runs into Jax, she suggests they ditch, while cloned Emma makes another clone of herself. The two end up at The Seven and kiss, and Andi witnesses it. Meanwhile, Maddie finally gets her powers back.
32	12	"The Emma Squad"	Clayton Boen	Catharina Ledeboer, Gloria Shen	July 23, 2014	212	1.94
Emma's cloning spell makes her social life go haywire; Maddie asks Lily to help her strengthen her powers. Absent : Tyler Alvarez as Diego Rueda
33	13	"Missminion"	Clayton Boen	Catharina Ledeboer	July 24, 2014	213	1.51
When he sees the clones, Daniel finally finds out the truth about Emma's powers for good and breaks up with her for hiding them from him; Maddie is happy because her powers are back, but, as sometimes they don't work, Diego helps her.
34	14	"The Breakup"	Clayton Boen	Catharina Ledeboer	July 25, 2014	214	1.64
Desdemona uses a spell to make Gigi her minion; tensions are high between Daniel and Emma following their split; the T3 decide to prank Emma.
35	15	"Emma Wants a Cracker"	Clayton Boen	Catharina Ledeboer & Gloria Shen	July 28, 2014	215	1.61
When Emma accidentally turns herself into a bird while attempting to stop the T3's prank, Daniel and Andi search for her.
36	16	"Stormageddon"	Clayton Boen	Catharina Ledeboer	July 29, 2014	216	N/A
Desdemona wants Emma and Daniel back together, so, hoping it will trap them together, she causes a magical storm to hit Miami: Emma and Jax are stuck at school together, where they make a huge discovery in the principal's office, Andi and Diego are trapped at the Seven, and Maddie and Daniel are at Daniel's house. Meanwhile, Ramona escapes, but Desdemona catches her and sends her back.
37	17	"About a Wizard"	Clayton Boen	Catharina Ledeboer & Gloria Shen	July 30, 2014	217	1.72
Desdemona tells the council that Emma made clones, and they threaten to take her powers away, but Jax makes a sacrifice for Emma by saying that he cloned Emma and getting his powers taken away, and Emma thanks him by giving him their first kiss. Daniel sees this and gets jealous, deciding to do anything to win back Emma; Maddie, Diego and Sophie plan a surprise party for Katie, but she thinks that they want her to make new friends.
38	18	"Beach Birthday Bash"	Clayton Boen	Catharina Ledeboer	July 31, 2014	218	1.99
Desdemona casts a spell on Daniel at Katie's party that makes every girl go crazy over him; the T3 constructs their biggest prank, but cannot decide on the victim: Jax or Daniel.
39	19	"Zombie Boyfriend"	Clayton Boen	Catharina Ledeboer & Gloria Shen	August 1, 2014	219	1.52
Emma brings Andi's video game boyfriend to life. Ursula tells Maddie to stop dating Diego because she is a witch and he is a Kanay, but she doesn't want to listen, so she dates Diego in secrecy. Meanwhile, Desdemona frames Lily for being a bad witch to get her out of her way, and Agamemnon sends Lily away. Also, the T3 pull their biggest prank ever at the school play on Daniel.
40	20	"Andi & Philip, Sittin' in a Tree"	Clayton Boen	Catharina Ledeboer & Gloria Shen	August 5, 2014	220	1.86
Andi helps her zombie boyfriend pass as a human, but Daniel convinces Emma to send Philip back into the game. Maddie continues to hide from Ursula that she is dating Diego. When Ursula almost discovers the truth, Maddie makes Katie lie to her by agreeing to make her a boyfriend. She makes Katie a boyfriend out of a dog, but he's still acting like a dog. As a punishment for blackmailing her, she has to spend the rest of the day with him. Agamemnon begins to uncover Desdemona's plot and attempts to stop her, but Desdemona sends him away after he burns off some of her hair in an attempt to stop her plan.
41	21	"BF-Never"	Clayton Boen	Catharina Ledeboer	August 6, 2014	221	2.27
Emma and Andi's friendship is put in jeopardy after Emma finally sends Philip back into the video game. Diego discovers that he has the ability to create portals, and while doing so Maddie throws trash into it, which reaches Lily and Ramona where they are being held captive. They decide to write a note and throw it back the next time Diego opens a portal. Meanwhile, Jax's father is revealed to be forcing Jax to use Emma to take over the magic realm. Jax wants to make sure Emma is safe, but his dad doesn't care and insists that he must push Emma into the portal when it's time. Elsewhere, Agamemnon finds Evil Emma, and believing her to be the real Emma, escapes 'The Abyss' with her, even teaching her how to send someone to Limbo. He then discovers she's a clone.
42	22	"The Abyss"	Clayton Boen	Catharina Ledeboer & Gloria Shen	August 7, 2014	222	1.79
Evil Emma sends Agamemnon to Limbo. Andi makes a troubling deal with Jax so that she could get Philip back; she helps Jax break into the Witches' Council but, once Jax steals his magic back, she finds out she was tricked, while an SOS message is sent to Diego and the Panthers from Ramona, Lily and Agamemnon from Limbo. Emma breaks up with Jax, then Emma and Daniel get trapped in the Abyss, where they share their second kiss and get back together. Jax sets Gigi free from Desdemona's spell, and then he and Evil Emma make an alliance with Desdemona to destroy the magic realm.
43	23	"I'll Stop the World"	Clayton Boen	Catharina Ledeboer	August 7, 2014	223	1.70
Emma and Daniel are in serious danger and must rely on Andi, the Pathers and the T3 to save them; Desdemona and Evil Emma make a pact to destroy the magical realm.
44	24	"Emma vs. Emma"	Clayton Boen	Catharina Ledeboer & Gloria Shen	August 8, 2014	997	1.70
Jax and Evil Emma make an alliance to destroy the Magic Realm with the last rays of the Fool Moon. Desdemona is individually doing the same as well. Andi asks for help from Maddie to free Daniel and Emma from the Abyss, and with the help of Sophie and the key to the door of the Abyss created by T3, Emma and Daniel escape, Emma and Andi make up, and the gang now must stop Jax, Evil Emma, and Desdemona from destroying the magical realm and taking over all of humankind. Diego holds open a portal while Maddie jumps in and saves the Council. Jax and Evil Emma take away Emma's powers and combine the last lights. Before she could destroy the realm, Desdemona is turned back to normal by the last light of the fool moon. Every magical being starts to get sucked (including Emma, Jax, Desdemona, the Hex, Agamemnon, Maddie, Ramona, Lily. and Diego) in but they hold on. Then, Jax returns Emma's powers, and Evil Emma gets sucked through the portal. Jax apologizes for all his actions, and Emma forgives him. The season ends with Daniel, Emma and Jax all getting along.

=== Special (2014) ===
Title	Directed by	Written by	Original air date	US viewers (millions)
"Spellbound"	Clayton Boen	Catharina Ledeboer	November 26, 2014	1.58
Gigi and Desdemona summarize what happened in the second season and give a sneak peek of the third season.

=== Season 3 (2015) ===
- This season began filming in October 2014.

No. overall	No. in season	Title	Directed by	Written by	Original air date	Production code	US viewers (millions)
45	1	"Beachside 7"	Clayton Boen	Catharina Ledeboer	January 5, 2015	301	1.66
The gang hangs out at their new summer spot, Beachside 7. Emma, working at the smoothie stand, accidentally freezes time. Only a mysterious girl named Mia, Maddie, and Diego remain unfrozen. Emma tries to fix it but fails. When she finally succeeds, Daniel is unfrozen, and they find Mia, who Daniel saves. Mia later pranks Emma, making a smoothie float.
46	2	"Rebel Emma"	Clayton Boen	Catharina Ledeboer & Gloria Shen	January 6, 2015	302	1.54
Desdemona send Emma to Rebel Boot Camp as punishment for casting spells in public, where she sees that Jax is there as well. Jax risks his powers to save Emma, and they get over their fears in a test. Meanwhile, when Ursula gets pranked, the T3 are framed for committing the prank when they didn't.
47	3	"Always You"	Clayton Boen	Catharina Ledeboer & Charlotte Owen	January 7, 2015	303	1.56
After she and Jax escape boot camp, Agamemnon catches them and tries to take Emma's powers, but fails and alters the others. Emma discovers Mia flirting with Daniel, and Diego learns more about being a Kanay. Jax hair becomes porcupine quills and Emma has to fix it. The T3 discover about the H2O, a duo who loves pranking as well, and they do research on the H2O to see what they have done to some over-the-top pranks. Emma and Daniel meet each other at the Seven and he sings a song to Emma. Emma and Andi go into the realm to try to get Andi a spot as a guardian, while Jax and the Hex chase after them when they are about to enter the Witches Council.
48	4	"Breaking All the Rules"	Clayton Boen	Catharina Ledeboer & Gloria Shen	January 8, 2015	304	1.67
Emma and Andi try to sneak into the Witches' Council, and Jax tries to stop them. Maddie and Diego want to repair the relationships between Witches and Kanays, and Mia causes trouble by shape shifting into people.
49	5	"Neverending Summer"	Clayton Boen	Catharina Ledeboer & Charlotte Owen	January 9, 2015	305	1.59
Jax struggles with his final boot camp exam and is in danger of losing his powers. Meanwhile, At the Beachside 7, during a Neverending Summer Party (a big event to make up for Francisco's birthday disaster), Jax graduates and Emma hugs him, and Daniel sees it and walks away, without anyone knowing. Mia shape shifts into Emma and walk over to Daniel, kisses him, sending a black spider tattoo to the back of his neck.
50	6	"Daniel Darko"	Clayton Boen	Catharina Ledeboer & Charlotte Owen	January 12, 2015	306	1.63
Mia, disguised as Emma, orchestrates a plan to make Daniel break up with Emma. Daniel acts strangely, publicly kissing Mia on stage and breaking Emma's heart. Emma runs off, and Jax comforts her. The T3 is framed for a prank at the Neverending Summer Party. Lily assigns Jax a test spell, but it goes wrong when he conjures lilies, which she's allergic to. Daniel teases Jax, leading to detention for both. The T3, punished by Daniel's mom, plans revenge on the H2O. Daniel skips detention to be with Mia, who tries to uncover Emma and Maddie's secrets. Emma interrupts, preventing Daniel from revealing the truth.
51	7	"No More Mr. Nice Guy"	Clayton Boen	Catharina Ledeboer & Gloria Shen	January 13, 2015	307	1.56
Daniel's strange behavior continues, prompting Emma, Andi, and Jax to investigate. Agamemnon and Desdemona show up, claiming to have taken Jax's powers and attempting to do the same to Emma. Meanwhile, Mia teaches Maddie a lesson by freezing her locker, and Diego inadvertently causes more trouble. Daniel reveals the witches' secret to Mia, who pretends ignorance. Andi interrupts before Daniel can say more. Mia tries to befriend Katie, and Jax seeks Emma's help to restore his powers. In the end, Diego and Andi discover a Kanay mark on Daniel, raising questions about the existence of another Kanay at the school.
52	8	"Spider No More"	Clayton Boen	Catharina Ledeboer	January 14, 2015	308	1.56
Mia and Daniel cause havoc in the school and try to plot against Emma. Meanwhile, Maddie tries to convince Katie that Mia is not her friend. Katie overhears Emma and Andi in the bathroom talking about Mia and that she's a Kanay. At the end of the episode, Emma casts a spell to get Daniel back to normal, but it turns out he was just acting and that the Kanay mark is still on his neck. Mia needs Daniel to put a special necklace on Emma, a necklace that weakens her and her powers.
53	9	"Back to Back"	Clayton Boen	Catharina Ledeboer & Charlotte Owen	January 15, 2015	309	1.90
A mysterious crystal from Mia's necklace magically binds Emma and Maddie together. Daniel becomes ill from the spider mark. Meanwhile, the H2O pull a prank on Francisco, and he believes the T3 committed it. Jax puts a spell on Daniel, causing him a lack of space to walk. Emma and Maddie know that Mia put the spider mark on Daniel. Later, Mia walks into Daniel's room and he is lying on the couch in danger of his life if the spider mark isn't removed.
54	10	"El Cristal del Caballero"	Clayton Boen	Catharina Ledeboer & Gloria Shen	January 16, 2015	310	1.57
Mia removes the spider mark from Daniel's neck, and Emma is delighted that he's back to normal. Katie sabotages Mia, recording her plan to destroy Emma and Maddie. The group confronts Lily to investigate Mia's involvement with the spider marking. Daniel breaks up with Mia after discovering the truth. Agamemnon and Desdemona warn Lily about the Cristal de Caballero potentially harming the Chosen One. Jax and Andi search for the missing crystal piece. Mia tries to manipulate Daniel and later traps Emma and Maddie in a janitor's closet using ice and snow. In a surprising twist, Diego reveals he is also a kanay, shocking Mia.
55	11	"Kanay vs. Kanay"	Clayton Boen	Catharina Ledeboer & Charlotte Owen	January 19, 2015	311	1.48
Emma and Maddie navigate their way out of the janitor's closet while Mia and Diego grow closer. Mia reveals her tragic past to Diego, mentioning her parents' destruction by the old Chosen One. The T3 seeks revenge on the H2O at Iridium High. Jax and Andi are caught smashing a wall in Francisco's office but are interrupted when Francisco leaves abruptly. Diego and Mia rescue Emma and Maddie. To prevent Katie from exposing her secret, Mia impersonates Maddie and sabotages their friendship. Andi seeks guidance from Agamemnon to become a guardian. Katie attempts to reconcile with Mia, while Jax and Andi break into Francisco's office. Jax's spell to make the walls invisible goes awry, turning Andi invisible instead, much to her delight.
56	12	"Invisible Me"	Clayton Boen	Catharina Ledeboer & Gloria Shen	January 20, 2015	312	1.51
Andi remains invisible, investigating Mia's schemes. Jax seeks Emma's help to make Andi visible again, and during the spell, Andi sneaks into Mia's basement. Emma talks to Daniel about Jax, attempting to clarify her feelings, but Daniel doesn't believe her. In the cafeteria, a spilled yogurt incident makes Daniel suspect Jax cast a spell. The repaired Cristal de Caballero inadvertently makes Andi invisible. Andi uses Emma's voice to fool Francisco, and Mia notices Agamemnon and Desdemona leaving Lily's office, expressing curiosity about their secrets.
57	13	"The Truth About Kanays"	Clayton Boen	Catharina Ledeboer	January 21, 2015	313	N/A
The Cristal De Caballero goes missing, and Andi accidentally reveals Emma's accidental invisible spell. Jax cheers up Emma at her house, leading to an argument with Daniel. Emma leaves and meets Jax near the secret locker to the Witches Council. Meanwhile, Maddie uses a spell to make Diego stick to her. Francisco, upset with Emma, grounds her, takes away her phone and club privileges, and bans her from seeing Jax or Daniel. Mia has a flashback about her Dad mentioning that every Kanay finds their other half, and she looks at a picture of Diego, stating, "Don't worry, Dad, I already found my half" at the end.
58	14	"Zombie Rescue Team"	Clayton Boen	Catharina Ledeboer & Gloria Shen	January 22, 2015	314	1.29
With the Cristal de Caballero missing, Agamemnon makes an offer that Andi can't refuse, get the crystal back and he'll consider human Guardians. However, the plan backfires; while trying to get the crystal back from Mia, she gets frozen. A little while after they leave, Hex brings Phillip (Andi's zombie boyfriend from season 2) back from his video game. Andi and Mia best each other, leaving Andi tied to the wall in spider webs and Mia stuck to the floor. Later, Diego comes by (with Mia telling him earlier to come by and that it's an emergency), he can't decide between helping either of them. Maddie shows up, jealous that Diego wasn't with her, but with Mia. Afterwards, a curious Daniel comes in wondering what happened to Mia and why his garage is such a mess. Earlier, Jax helps Emma find Andi by turning into a dog and sniffing her out. Phillip makes an appearance, resulting in a joyful Andi, and an even more confused Daniel. At the end, Mia gets out, and has Emma, Jax, Andi, Maddie, Diego, Phillip, trapped, as well as Daniel, but she states she's trying to get them out of there.
59	15	"Enchanted Ever After"	Clayton Boen	Catharina Ledeboer, Gloria Shen & Charlotte Owen	January 23, 2015	996	1.45
A special episode summarizing what you've missed during the starting of the season and show what will happen in future content.
60	16	"Kangaroo Jax"	Clayton Boen	Catharina Ledeboer	January 26, 2015	315	1.46
Jax goes on a rampage around the halls at Iridium High when the Council turns him into a kangaroo after he refuses to give them information about Emma. Meanwhile, Mia offers Diego to battle her in a Kanay duel.
61	17	"Defiance"	Clayton Boen	Catharina Ledeboer & Gloria Shen	January 27, 2015	316	1.61
Kangaroo Jax is turned back into regular Jax, and Jax tells Emma about a conversation he heard with the council trying to overthrow Emma.
62	18	"Magical Throwdown"	Clayton Boen	Catharina Ledeboer	January 28, 2015	317	1.27
Diego trains for his battle and Katie tells the gang what happens if he loses. The battle goes under way and Maddie shows up to watch. Mia mocks Maddie, and Diego tries to defend her only to wind up getting hurt and losing the battle. Back at Maddie's house, they think it was a draw until Mia calls and says that Diego is under her control.
63	19	"The Kanay Strikes Back"	Clayton Boen	Catharina Ledeboer	January 29, 2015	318	1.41
Diego must obey Mia. Emma and Andi have a hard time turning Phillip into a human, but, in the end, Emma does it using the Cristal de Caballero. Agamemnon and Desdemona appears when Phillip is a normal boy. The crystal is lost in Daniel's room and Mia shows up to get it back; also, Emma is drained of nearly all power and must leave quickly.
64	20	"New Witch Order"	Clayton Boen	Catharina Ledeboer	January 30, 2015	995	1.71
Phillip transforms into a human, while Emma experiences weakness and an inability to cast spells due to crystal side effects. The gang, including Agamemnon and Desdemona, tends to Emma at Daniel's house, discovering their loss of powers. Daniel's mom demands answers, but Desdemona's spell fails. Daniel wishes to be with Emma rather than Jax. Meanwhile, Emma and Mia find themselves trapped in a zombie video game, facing zombie threats. Initially hesitant, Mia later helps Emma in the game. Jax intervenes, and they all return home after retrieving the crystal. Emma stands up to the Council, asserting her independence. Mia breaks free from controlling Diego, and as the group leaves, Emma faces a crucial choice between Jax and Daniel. Opting for Jax, they share a romantic second kiss at the pool. Note: Nickelodeon filmed two ending scenes of Emma and her guy: one with Jax and one with Daniel, because they did an online voting where fans get to decide who Emma would choose. At the end, Jax got the most votes, this leading to Emma choosing him.

=== Season 4 (2015) ===
- Julia Antonelli stars as Jessie Novoa, Jax's little sister.
- Betty Monroe stars as Liana Woods, Jax's and Jessie's mother.

No. overall	No. in season	Title	Directed by	Written by	Original air date	Production code	US viewers (millions)
65	1	"A World Without You"	Clayton Boen	Catharina Ledeboer & Charlotte Owen	July 6, 2015	401	1.50
After Emma chooses Jax in the season three finale, they rejoice in their reunion. However, confusion ensues when Emma discovers that no one remembers Daniel. He is inexplicably gone from her life, house, and even her phone. The search for Daniel leads to an unsettling revelation: a couple named Daniel Sanchez and his wife have been in his house for the past two decades. Emma, Andi, and The Panthers try to unravel the mystery, but The Council, whom Emma chose Jax over as her advisor, refuses to help. The urgency increases as Lily reveals that it might be a continuum break, and if not resolved in five days, something ominous will happen to Daniel. Jax and Emma work together to find a solution, but Jax faces challenges with his father and multiple clones. The clock is ticking as they race against time to save Daniel from a mysterious fate in the Everglades.
66	2	"Road Trippin'"	Clayton Boen	Catharina Ledeboer & Gloria Shen	July 7, 2015	402	1.29
Lily reveals that a previous Chosen One caused a continuum break, leading to her husband living an alternate life. If the triggering witch fails to remind the lost person of their past, they will vanish in five days. Emma decides to locate Daniel despite the risks. Jax joins the search but rushes home abruptly. A magic private investigator suggests Daniel could be in three different lives. After ruling out options, they receive a lead pointing to the Everglades. Lily agrees to chaperone a field trip. Jax, Emma, and Andi embark on the journey, trailed by Maddie and the Panthers in a malfunctioning RV. The RV breaks down, leaving them stranded and unaware of a mysterious noise. Absent: Nick Merico as Daniel Miller
67	3	"Ever in the Everglades"	Clayton Boen	Catharina Ledeboer & Charlotte Owen	July 8, 2015	403	1.54
Jax, Emma, and Andi continue their search for Daniel in the park. Meanwhile, the RV crew struggles to fix their vehicle until Daniel appears to help, attracting Gigi's attention. Emma spots Daniel in the RV but realizes he has no memory of her. Maddie's attempt to capture the moment results in chaos, with Gigi fleeing, and Maddie and the Panthers giving chase. Daniel offers a tour of the animal sanctuary, introducing Emma to his family. Lily contacts Desdemona and Agamemnon, who caution Emma against revealing too much to Daniel to avoid him vanishing. While on airboats, the group gets separated, with Katie locked in a cage and the others losing track of the girls. Daniel calls for help, but tensions rise as Jax insists on leaving once the girls are found, while Emma feels responsible for fixing Daniel's life. The future of their relationship hangs in the balance.
68	4	"Stuck in a Storm"	Clayton Boen	Catharina Ledeboer & Charlotte Owen	July 9, 2015	404	1.46
Amidst the impending storm, Jax considers teleporting away but decides to stay when Emma warns about his spiky hair in the rain. Sophie and Katie are trapped, and Mia, affected by the continuum break too, becomes their guide. Agamemnon and Desdemona investigate the break. Maddie uses a spell to locate the girls, but Lily receives a warning from the Council about Emma. The group, split into airboats, sets out to rescue the girls. Gigi gets stuck in the trap with Sophie and Katie. The Council instructs Lily to report Emma's actions. The group, including Daniel and Mia, reunites, deciding to wait out the storm. Emma confides in Andi about her fuzzy memories and conflicting realities. Diego finds a Kanay marking, hinting at their presence. Jax gets jealous seeing Daniel with Emma. Andi reassures Jax about Emma's feelings. Jax, trying to create a private dinner, accidentally includes Gigi in the spell.
69	5	"A Tale of Two Lives"	Clayton Boen	Catharina Ledeboer & Jeff Sayers	July 10, 2015	405	1.24
Jax's spell mishap during dinner hits Daniel with a plate, prompting questions from Gigi. Andi intervenes, Sophie and Katie cover up the magic, and Daniel is tied up to prevent revelations. Emma convinces Jax and Andi to talk to Daniel alone, revealing magic and breaking the continuum. In the hallway, Maddie's attempt to erase Gigi's memory hits a snag. Daniel, now aware of magic, leaves, causing concern among the group. Lily insists on staying the night, and tensions rise. Emma starts another continuum break, convincing Daniel to join them to save his family. The night brings humorous moments and tension in sleeping arrangements. The next morning, the group prepares to leave, and Emma shares insights on memory wiping with Diego. Gigi's memory is erased, and the group returns home. Jax finds his house open, discovering a surprise - his sister Jessie with the clones in the kitchen.
70	6	"Twisted Sister"	Clayton Boen	Catharina Ledeboer & Charlotte Owen	July 13, 2015	406	1.39
Jessie explains where she has been for the past few years to Jax. Jax takes her to school to keep an eye on her, but he leaves her with Andi. Andi tapes Jessie to a door while Emma takes Daniel to the Seven, which is their secret spot at Iridium High, in an attempt to restore his memory. Desdemona and Agamemnon steal Daniel away, and he decides to go back to the Everglades. Emma tries convincing him otherwise. When Jax takes Jessie home, Jake sees Jessie and recognizes her. Special Guest Star:Julia Antonelli as Jessie Novoa, Julia Antonelli is seen again in WITS Academy because she gets her powers in Season 4 of Every Witch Way.
71	7	"Lunch at Lola's"	Clayton Boen	Catharina Ledeboer & Charlotte Owen	July 14, 2015	407	1.16
As part of Daniel's memory recovery, the gang travels to a restaurant in Miami called Lola's, where they have a magical encounter with a bowl of food that makes everybody say what's on their mind no matter what it is. Note: This is a crossover with Talia in the Kitchen, succeeded by their episode "Every Witch Lola's".
72	8	"Monkey Face Emoji"	Clayton Boen	Catharina Ledeboer & Jeff Sayers	July 15, 2015	408	1.36
Since Daniel's remembers everything only up until the day he and Emma met, he believes that Maddie is his girlfriend, making Diego upset. Jax searches for information about his mother after finding out that she isn't dead.
73	9	"The Final Countdown"	Clayton Boen	Catharina Ledeboer & Charlotte Owen	July 17, 2015	409	1.29
Jax learns the truth about his family. Emma does everything she can to restore Daniel's memory in the few hours that he has left, so she takes Daniel to his old house and brings him inside trying to recreate the room in which Daniel loved but fails. Then, at the last minute, Daniel kisses Emma. Meanwhile, Jax walks into the house looking for Emma when he finds her he sees the kiss and then he gets upset and flashes out rather quickly, causing a conflict in their relationship.
74	10	"Diego's Wipedown"	Clayton Boen	Catharina Ledeboer & Charlotte Owen	July 20, 2015	410-411	1.07
After the Continuum Break ends, Emma tries to restore her relationship with Jax, so she does it by jumping back in time with him to show that Daniel kissed her, but she pulled away and said that she's with Jax. After he sees this, their problems are fixed.
75	11	"Van Pelt Reunion"	Clayton Boen	Catharina Ledeboer & Jeff Sayers	July 21, 2015	412	1.30
Emma seeks information about her mother. Ursula becomes head of the Van Pelt Coven, and starts praising Diego after he saves the Coven from Jake, who arrives as an unexpected guest at the Van Pelt family reunion.
76	12	"Back to Square One"	Clayton Boen	Catharina Ledeboer & Jeff Sayers	July 22, 2015	413	1.13
Emma wants to rescue her mom by traveling back in time. Meanwhile, Daniel seeks a return trip to the Everglades, and Jake and Jessie go into hiding.
77	13	"Power in a Bottle"	Clayton Boen	Catharina Ledeboer & Charlotte Owen	July 23, 2015	414	0.96
Jax discovers Jake and Jessie's hiding spot. Elsewhere, Emma takes away the Council's powers after they try to take hers away.
78	14	"What If?"	Clayton Boen	Catharina Ledeboer & Charlotte Owen	July 24, 2015	415	1.17
Emma's actions during her search for a time manipulation spell upset Andi; this causes a rift between them. Elsewhere, Diego looks for more Kanays.
79	15	"Forever Charmed"	Clayton Boen	Catharina Ledeboer, Amir Thomas, Jeff Sayers, Gloria Shen & Charlotte Owen	July 27, 2015	993	N/A
A special episode that summarizes what happened so far in season 4 and previews upcoming episodes.
80	16	"Frenemies"	Clayton Boen	Story by : Catharina Ledeboer, Charlotte Owen & Jeff Sayers; Teleplay by : Charlotte Owen & Jeff Sayers	July 27, 2015	416	1.22
Emma tricks Maddie into giving her powers to her. This causes problems in not only Maddie's friendship but also Diego's friendship as well with Emma. Meanwhile, Jax is trying to protect Jessie and his mom Liana from Jake after he stopped by just a couple hours earlier. Emma mentions she needs more power to turn back time, but won't take Jax's powers. At the end of the episode, she says that she needs someone more powerful, like Jake, leaving Jax's face in shock.
81	17	"Stop Emma"	Clayton Boen	Story by : Catharina Ledeboer & Charlotte Owen; Teleplay by : Charlotte Owen	July 28, 2015	417	1.22
Emma's friends decide that they must stop her for good. Jake finally tells Jax that Liana is a witch.
82	18	"Mommie Dearest"	Clayton Boen	Story by : Catharina Ledeboer, Charlotte Owen & Jeff Sayers; Teleplay by : Charlotte Owen & Jeff Sayers	July 29, 2015	418	1.69
The group stages a "witchervention" for Emma. Emma decides to bring back the Principal from season 1 to take her powers away from her. Later, Jax discovers his mother is still alive and is bound to find her.
83	19	"A Girl's Sacrifice"	Clayton Boen	Story by : Catharina Ledeboer, Charlotte Owen & Jeff Sayers; Teleplay by : Charlotte Owen & Jeff Sayers	July 30, 2015	419-420	1.64
84	20	"A Girl's Sacrifice"	Clayton Boen	Story by : Catharina Ledeboer, Charlotte Owen & Jeff Sayers; Teleplay by : Charlotte Owen & Jeff Sayers	July 30, 2015	419-420	1.64
In a complex turn of events, Emma brings back the Principal and E from previous seasons. Emma, fearing the potential harm they might cause, uses a spell to block and strip their powers. However, Liana, a new threat, arrives, intending to take over the powers of all seven witches. Jessie, Jax's sister, witnesses the events and gains her powers, helping unfreeze Jax. The gang, including Daniel, Andi, and Maddie, forms a plan with Ursula distracting Francisco while Daniel and Andi assist Emma. Liana traps the group in lockers, but Ursula and Francisco share a moment. Jax and Jessie arrive, with Jessie taking control of the magical orb, leading to Liana's banishment to Limbo. Emma returns powers to the Council and Maddie, sends the Principal to Limbo, and incorporates E into her body. The following day, Emma and Andi visit the Novoas, and later, Emma and Andi discover that Daniel and Mia are a couple, but they act like they don't know him. Emma decides not to change the past to save her mom but triggers another Continuum Break on Daniel, allowing Andi to remember him this time. Emma reveals her plan to train as a Guardian at W.I.T.s Academy, and Andi, excited for her, receives the Hex. Emma and Andi, along with Jax, Diego, Gigi, and the Panthers, gather at Iridium High. After heartfelt goodbyes, Andi goes through a portal, teleporting to a ruined area, setting the stage for the events of W.I.T.s Academy. Special Guest Stars: Julia Antonelli as Jessie Novoa; Betty Monroe as Liana, Jax and Jessie's mother.
