= Every Witch Way =

Nickelodeon TV series & English-language adaptation of Grachi

- Genre: Teen drama Fantasy
- Created by: Mariela Romero; Catharina Ledeboer
- Written by: Catharina Ledeboer; Gloria Shen; Charlotte Owen; Jeff Sayers
- Directed by: Arturo Manuitt (season 1); Leonardo Galavis (season 1); Clayton Boen (season 2-4)
- Starring: Paola Andino
- Opening theme: "Every Witch Way"
- Composers: Rainer Lorenzo; Ingrid Rodgers
- Country of origin: United States
- Original language: English
- No. of seasons: 4
- No. of episodes: 84 (list of episodes)

Production
- Executive producers: Tatiana Rodríguez; JC Acosta
- Running time: 22–23 minutes
- Production company: Nickelodeon Productions

Original release
- Network: Nickelodeon
- Release: January 1, 2014 – July 30, 2015

Related
- Grachi; WITS Academy

Every Witch Way is an American teen drama that aired on Nickelodeon from January 1, 2014, to July 30, 2015. The series is an English-language remake of Nickelodeon Latin America's telenovela Grachi. It follows 14-year-old Emma Alonso (Paola Andino), who moves to Miami, Florida, with her father and discovers she is a witch, and her rivalry with Maddie Van Pelt (Paris Smith), also a witch with a love triangle with Daniel Miller (Nick Merico).

== Episodes ==
Season	Episodes	Originally released (U.S.)	
Season	Episodes	First released	Last released
1	20	January 1, 2014	January 30, 2014
2	24	July 7, 2014	August 8, 2014
Special		November 26, 2014	
3	20	January 5, 2015	January 30, 2015
4	20	July 6, 2015	July 30, 2015

== Cast and characters ==
=== Main ===
- Emma Alonso (portrayed by Paola Andino) is a new student at Iridium High and the Chosen One, the most powerful witch. Her Guardian is Lily, the school nurse. In the third season, Emma works as a waitress at the Beachside Seven and becomes more independent with her powers. In the third season finale, she chooses Jax over Daniel. This triggers a Continuum Break on Daniel in the fourth season, transporting him to a sanctuary near the Everglades.
- Daniel Miller (portrayed by Nick Merico) is an athletic student at Iridium High and a former member of the Sharks. He had a constant on-and-off relationship with Maddie Van Pelt, despite holding an interest in Emma. Eventually, he fully breaks up with Maddie and starts to date Emma. He is also a human, not a wizard, thus making the Witches' Council pressure Emma to break up with him in the second season. He has a rivalry with Jax over Emma. In the third season, he is a lifeguard at the Beachside Seven, and soon gets Mia as his partner. This leads to her sending a spider to bite him, making his 'inner wild' come out. Later, Mia removes the spider from Daniel because it makes him very sick. At the end of the third season, Emma chooses Jax over Daniel, making a Continuum Break shift Daniel into another life in a sanctuary by the Everglades. Emma tries to restore his memory, but sends him back in the series finale to make him happy. He is the American counterpart of Daniel Esquivel.
- Maddie Van Pelt (portrayed by Paris Smith) is a witch who is the school's most popular student and head of a clique called the Panthers. She hates Emma in the first season because she stole Daniel from her, but they become friends after everything they have gone through and because she develops feelings for Diego, whom she ends up dating.
- Andi Cruz (portrayed by Daniela Nieves) is Emma's best friend, a tomboy who is a member of the Sharks. She is often accompanied by the Hexoren, a sentient spellbook, and is the only known human who can understand it. She also starts to become friends with Jax. In the second season, her virtual zombie boyfriend Phillip comes out of the Zombie Apocalypse game; by the third season, he returns and stays for good. At the end of the series, Andi sets off to train to become a Guardian at the WITS Academy.
- Jax Novoa (portrayed by Rahart Adams) is a member of the Sharks and a rebel wizard who is impulsive with his powers, using them for his own interests in the second season. Jax uses Emma to gain magic energy and take over the realm. She soon breaks up with him after Daniel shares a kiss with her. In the third season, Jax begins using his magic for the benefit of others and begins dating Emma.
- Diego Rueda (portrayed by Tyler Alvarez) is Gigi's twin brother and a Sharks member. He is among the Churi Kanay (meaning "Son of Fire"), a group who can control the elements, and initially believes himself to be the last of the Churi Kanay until Mia, a rebel Kanay, comes to Miami. His family owns The Seven, as well as the Beachside 7, and he is often working there. In the second season, he has an interest in Maddie, but Ursula does not approve, so he tries to impress Maddie in every way that he can. In the third season, Diego and Maddie are a couple, and they try to fix the bond between witches and Kanays.
- Mia Black (portrayed by Elizabeth Elias) is a rebel Kanay who wants all witches to be destroyed because one of them, who happens to be the Principal, killed her parents. Unlike Diego, she has been raised as Kanay since her birth, so she wields her powers with a much greater ease and skill than Diego. Mia has a spider Kanay mark on her arm, which causes a person's 'inner wild' to come out. In the fourth season, Mia is Daniel's girlfriend in his other life in the Everglades.
- Katie Rice (portrayed by Denisea Wilson) is a member of the Panthers and one of Maddie's best friends. She wants to be the head Panther. Although she acts popular, she is actually smart and geeky. In the third season, Katie leaves the Panthers and becomes friends with Mia, although it is revealed that she only did so to get information out of her.
- Sophie Johnson (portrayed by Autumn Wendel) is a member of the Panthers and another one of Maddie's best friends. She is dimwitted and very gullible. Other than Emma (and now Andi), she is one of the only characters to tolerate Jax.
- Gigi Rueda (portrayed by Zoey Burger) is a reporter and Diego's twin sister. In the second season, because of a spell, Gigi becomes Desdemona's minion, but later on she is freed by Jax and E (Evil Emma). In the third season, she is a waitress at the Beachside Seven, but she blogs more than she works. She is kept out of the loop of the magic going on in Miami; even after finding out about it, her memory is quickly wiped out by Maddie.
- Tony Myers (portrayed by Kendall Ryan Sanders) is a mathlete, amateur magician, and member of the Sharks; he had a crush on Emma. He does not appear after the first season, having left to attend a magic academy.
- Mac Davis (portrayed by Mavrick Moreno) is a member of the Sharks and Diego's best friend. He does not appear after the first season.

=== Recurring ===
- Lily Archer (portrayed by Melissa Carcache) is a school nurse and Emma's Guardian witch. She uses a magic kit to perform magic, lacking any magic of her own. She becomes a member of the Witches' Council in the second season.
- Robert Miller (portrayed by Louis Tomeo) is Daniel's brother, the oldest and leader of the Terrible 3 (T3) and their best inventor. He is the American counterpart of Roberto Esquivel.
- Melanie Miller (portrayed by Jackie Frazey) is Daniel's sister who is the middle child and only girl of the Terrible 3 as well as the smartest. She does not appear in the fourth season.
- Tommy Miller (portrayed by Jason Ian Drucker) is Daniel's brother who is the youngest of the Terrible 3 and most hyperactive. He is the American counterpart of Luis Esquivel.
- Ursula Van Pelt (portrayed by Katie Barbieri) is Maddie's mother who holds feelings for Francisco. In the second season, Maddie's powers lands on her, and she uses them to make Francisco fall in love with her, though they finally kiss in the series finale. Ursula does not like Diego because he is a Kanay, and does not accept him and Maddie dating; however, she finally accepts Diego when he saves the Van Pelt family reunion from Jake. Ursula also wants to prove herself as a hero to the council. Ursula is head of the Van Pelt Coven. In the third season, she adopts Philip.
- Francisco Alonso (portrayed by Rene Lavan) is Emma's father. He becomes Iridium High's principal in the second season after former Principal Torres's defeat in the first season. He dislikes Daniel and likes Jax. He does not know that Emma is a witch, though his wife was one. He has a hard time talking about his wife with Emma. He and Ursula kiss in the fourth season finale: although shown to not have feelings for her, he makes it clear that he does when he returns the kiss. He has the same name as his Latin counterpart from Grachi.
- Desdemona (portrayed by Mia Matthews) is a member of the Witches' Council and Emma's new Guardian in the second season while Lily is in training. In the season, the Fool Moon turns her evil, having her bent on destroying the magic world, but she is restored to normal by the last light.
- Agamemnon (portrayed by Todd Allen Durkin) is the leader of the Witches' Council and the supervisor of Rebels Boot Camp in the third season. He becomes the headmaster of the WITs Academy in the same-named spin-off.
- Christine Miller (portrayed by Whitney Goin) is Daniel's mother.
- Julio (portrayed by Rafael de la Fuente) is the adopted son of the Principal and the coach of the Sharks. He is later revealed to have been a frog who was turned into a human.
- Rick Miller (portrayed by Jimmie Bernal) is Daniel's father. He does not appear after the first season.
- Ramona (portrayed by Lisa Corrao) is a member of the Witches' Council. She does not appear after the second season.
- Jake Novoa (portrayed by Richard Lawrence-O'Brian) is Jax's father, a charming yet dangerous wizard who is obsessed with power. He seems evil, but he is just looking out for his family.
- Jessie Novoa (portrayed by Julia Antonelli) is Jax's long-lost younger sister who is introduced in the fourth season. She did not have powers at the beginning, but she finally gets them in the series finale, thus leading her to attend the WITS Academy to train.
- Liana Woods-Novoa (portrayed by Betty Monroe) is a witch who is Jax and Jessie's mother.
- Philip Van Pelt (portrayed by Liam Obergfoll) is a zombie and Andi's boyfriend. He originates from a video game that she hacked. In the third season, Philip is restored to life by Emma and turned into a human.
- Oscar (portrayed by Ethan Estrada) is Diego and Gigi's cousin and a member of H2O, a group similar to the Terrible 3.
- Hector (portrayed by Nicholas James) is Diego and Gigi's cousin, Oscar's younger brother, and member of H2O..
- Sebastian (portrayed by Demetrius Daniels) is Gigi's cameraman.
- Evil Emma (portrayed by Paola Andino), nicknamed "E", is an evil and rebellious clone of Emma. In the fourth season, Emma fuses with E to prevent her from ever returning.
- Principal Torres (portrayed by Michele Verdi) is a former Chosen One and the principal of Iridium High. She intends to take Emma's powers for herself.
- The Hexoren is a sentient spellbook that can fly, open up to a specific page on command, and communicate. Throughout the series, the Hexoren is often seen accompanying Andi; in the series finale, Emma entrusts the Hexoren to Andi as she goes to WITS Academy.

== Production ==
The first season aired throughout January 2014. On March 13, 2014, Nickelodeon announced a second season, which aired from July 7 to August 8, 2014. The show was renewed for a third season on July 31, 2014, which premiered on January 5, 2015. On February 25, 2015, Nickelodeon announced a fourth season and a spin-off titled WITS Academy. The fourth season, which was the final season, ended on July 30, 2015. WITS Academy premiered on October 5, 2015, and aired for one season.

== Broadcast ==
Every Witch Way premiered on July 7, 2014, on YTV in Canada, and on July 14, 2014, on Nickelodeon in the United Kingdom and Ireland. In Australia the series debuted on August 4, 2014, on Nickelodeon. The second season premiered on February 9, 2015. The first season premiered on Irish channel RTÉ 2 in April 2015. The show has been shown multiple times on the Sri Lankan network TV Derana, dubbed in Sinhalese, under the name "මැජික් ළමයි" (mæjik ḷamayi), lit. 'Magical children'.

== Reception ==
=== Critical ===
Emily Ashby of Common Sense Media gave Every Witch Way 2 stars, stating that the show "devotes too much time and energy to Maddie's superficiality and spite," making it an unsuitable choice for an impressionable age group. She criticized that "none of Maddie's actions ever land her in hot water she can't work a spell to escape," so viewers never see her learn a lesson. Ashby also noted that the show "suffers from subpar acting and a low-budget look and feel," and that the lack of a laugh track makes it "unusually flat for a tween sitcom." She added that the absence of engaging elements leaves "nothing to distract [viewers] from the excessive superficiality and pettiness" of many of the central characters.

=== Ratings ===
The premiere episode of Every Witch Way drew an estimated 2.10 million viewers. The second episode saw an increase to 2.86 million viewers. The season one finale on January 30, 2014, drew 2.60 million viewers, with the season averaging 2.166 million viewers and achieving top ratings in the 4–11 demographic.

Season two averaged 1.696 million viewers, with its eighth episode drawing 1.71 million viewers and the finale on August 8, 2014, attracting 1.70 million viewers. The Spellbound special, which aired on November 26, 2014, had 1.58 million viewers and achieved top ratings for the 18–49 demographic.

The season three premiere had 1.66 million viewers, with slight fluctuations throughout the season. The season three finale drew 1.71 million viewers.

Season four premiered with 1.50 million viewers. A crossover episode with Talia in the Kitchen drew 1.16 million viewers, while the 14th episode had 0.96 million viewers. The series finale on July 30, 2015, attracted 1.64 million viewers.

== Awards and nominations ==
Year	Award	Category	Work	Result	Refs
2014	Imagen Awards	Best Children's Programming	Every Witch Way	Nominated	
2014	Imagen Awards	Best Young Actress/Television	Paola Andino	Nominated	
2014	Kids' Choice Awards Argentina	Best International Program	Every Witch Way	Won	
2015	Young Artist Awards	Best Performance in a TV Series – Leading Young Actress	Paola Andino	Won	
2015	Kids' Choice Awards	Favorite TV Show	Every Witch Way	Nominated	
2015	Reggie Awards	Entertainment Campaign	Every Witch Way	Nominated	

== DVD releases ==
Season	Release dates		
Season	Region 1	Region 2	Region 4
1	June 13, 2014	TBA	TBA
2	January 7, 2015	TBA	TBA

== International broadcast ==
Country	Network(s)	Series premiere	Series finale	Language	Title
Sri Lanka	TV Derana	August 5, 2019	December 30, 2019	Dubbed in Sinhalese	"මැජික් ළමයි" (mæjik ḷamayi), lit. 'Magical children'
Vietnam	SCTV3	September 1, 2016	November 1, 2017		
Vietnam	SeeTV	September 1, 2016	November 1, 2017		
