= Paola Andino =

American actress (born 1998)

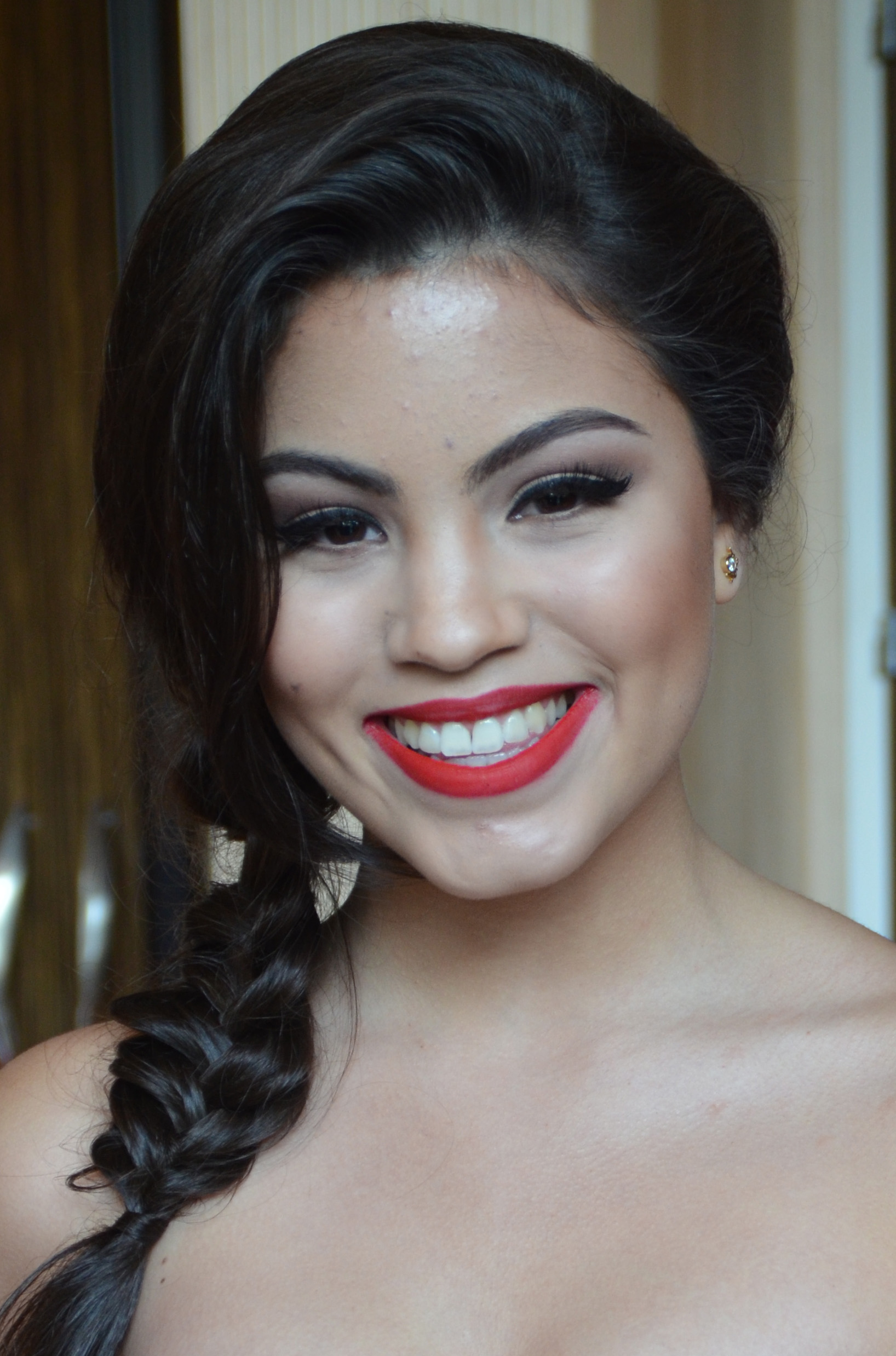
- Andino in 2014
- Born: March 22, 1998 (age 28); Bayamón, Puerto Rico
- Occupation: Actress
- Years active: 2001–present

Paola Andino (born March 22, 1998) is an American actress known for her lead role as Emma Alonso in the Nickelodeon series Every Witch Way.

== Biography ==
Paola Andino was born in Bayamón, Puerto Rico, and moved to Dallas, Texas, at the age of three with her parents and brother. As a child, she danced competitively as a member of Lewisville's Footlights Dance Studio; at the age of ten she started taking acting classes with Antonia Denardo at Denardo Talent Ventures in Lewisville. After a guest appearance in an episode of Grey's Anatomy, in 2011, she starred in Hallmark Hall of Fame's movie Beyond the Blackboard.

In December 2013, she got the role of Emma Alonso, the female lead, in the series Every Witch Way, which started airing in January 2014. Andino went on to guest star in the show's spinoff Wits Academy for two episodes. She was also a recurring guest star on Queen of the South. For this role, she was nominated as Best Young Actress at the 29th Imagen Awards.

== Filmography ==
Television roles
Year	Title	Role	Notes
2010	Grey's Anatomy	Lily Price	Episode: "These Arms of Mine"
2011	Beyond the Blackboard	Maria	TV movie
2014	ReactToThat	Herself	
2014–15	Every Witch Way	Emma Alonso/Evil Emma	Lead role
2015	Talia in the Kitchen	Emma Alonso	Crossover episode: "Every Witch Lola's"
2015	WITS Academy	Emma Alonso	2 episodes
2017	Queen of the South	Olivia "Chaparra" Gutiérrez	5 episodes
2021	Walker	Delia Carillo	Episode: "Don't Fence Me In"
2024	CSI: Vegas	Ella Darling	Episode: "Coinkydink"
2024–2025	Dexter: Original Sin	Jen	3 episodes
2025	FBI: Most Wanted	Emilia Martinez	Episode: Trust

Film roles
Year	Title	Role	Notes
2020	Sno Babies	Hannah	
2022	Free Dead or Alive	Isabella	
2024	Lisa Frankenstein	Misty	
2025	Re-Election	Alaina	
