= Daniela Nieves =

American actress

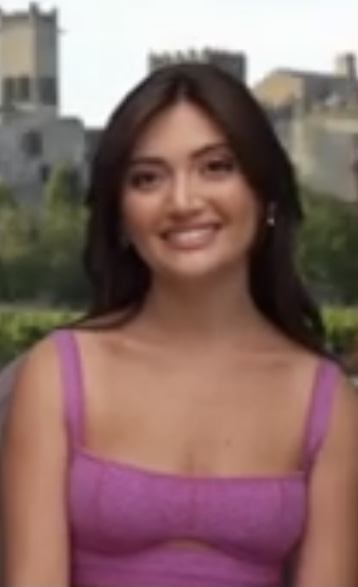
- Nieves in 2022
- Born: July 4, 1997 (age 29); Maracaibo, Venezuela
- Occupation: Actress
- Years active: 2006–present

Daniela Nieves (born July 4, 1997, Maracaibo, Venezuela is a Venezuelan-American actress best known for playing Andi Cruz on the Nickelodeon series Every Witch Way and WITS Academy.

== Biography ==
Nieves was born in Venezuela and moved to the United States when she was four months old. She began her acting career in 2006 as a child actress, when she appeared in the telenovela La viuda de Blanco, El Rostro de Analía, Una Maid en Manhattan and Mi corazón es tuyo. Nieves was cast to play the main role as Andrea "Andi" Cruz in the Nickelodeon sitcom Every Witch Way and also the lead role in WITS Academy. Nieves played the role of Ananda in the teen drama web series Five Points. In 2022, Nieves was cast to play the main role in the fantasy horror series Vampire Academy, where she played the main role as Lissa Dragomir.

== Filmography ==
Year	Title	Role	Notes
2006	La viuda de Blanco	Patricia Giraldo	Episode #1.1
2008	El Rostro de Analía	Adriana Montiel Andrade	Recurring, 108 episodes
2011	Una Maid en Manhattan	Alejandra Varela	Episode: "Gran lanzamiento"
2014	Mi corazón es tuyo	Guadalupe Martinez	Episode: "Te Amo!"
2014–15	Every Witch Way	Andrea "Andi" Cruz	Main role, 83 episodes
2015	Talia in the Kitchen	Andi Cruz	Episode: "Every Witch Lola's"
2015	WITS Academy	Andi Cruz	Lead role, 20 episodes
2018	Five Points	Ananda	Recurring (season 1)Main (season 2)
2022	Sex Appeal	Lyssa	Film
2022	Vampire Academy	Lissa Dragomir	Main role
2023	The Friendly	Sofia	
2025	Pulse	Camila Perez	Recurring, 9 episodes
