= Tyler Alvarez =

American actor (born 1997)

- Born: Tyler Sage Alvarez; October 25, 1997 (age 29); New York City, U.S.
- Education: Fiorello H. LaGuardia High School
- Occupation: Actor
- Years active: 2013–present

Tyler Sage Alvarez (born October 25, 1997) is an American actor, known for his series leading role as Peter Maldonado in Netflix's mockumentary series American Vandal.

== Early life ==
Alvarez was born in New York City, to a first generation Cuban American father, and a fourth generation Puerto Rican American mother. His father works for the Drug Enforcement Administration and his mother works as a nurse administrator for a private hospital. He had one older brother, Niko, who died in October 2018. Alvarez's parents divorced when he was a child and both subsequently remarried. He has two younger half-siblings, Alex and Brianna, from his father, and a younger half-sister, Sofia, from his mother.

Alvarez was educated at Fiorello H. LaGuardia High School in New York City, and at Jericho High School in Jericho, New York. He is fluent in Spanish.

== Career ==
Alvarez's first professional acting job was in a Totino's pizza rolls commercial. In 2014, he began starring as Diego Rueda, a human with magical powers, in Nickelodeon's teen sitcom Every Witch Way. The following year, Alvarez began portraying Benny Mendoza, the eldest son of Litchfield inmate Gloria Mendoza, in Netflix's comedy-drama series Orange Is the New Black.

In 2017, he began playing the lead role of Peter Maldonado in Netflix's true crime mockumentary series American Vandal. He returned for the second season which aired in 2018. The series has since been cancelled by Netflix.

Tyler Alvarez also appeared in the YouTube satirical miniseries ¡Me Llamo Alma!, starring as Miguel.

In 2020, Alvarez made his off-Broadway debut with the Roundabout Theatre Company's play 72 Miles to Go. The production closed prematurely due to the COVID-19 pandemic.

Alvarez joined the cast of Netflix show Never Have I Ever as a recurring character in season 2.

In 2023-2024 he plays Ralph, a cholera ghost, in one episode each of seasons 2 and 3 of Ghosts.

== Personal life ==
On June 11, 2021, Alvarez publicly came out as gay on social media.

== Filmography ==
=== Film ===
Year	Title	Role	Notes
2013	The House That Jack Built	Young Hector	
2013	Brothers in Arms	Logan	Short film
2018	Pretenders	Doug	
2020	John Henry	Oscar	
2022	Crush	Dillon	
2023	Sid is Dead	Jim Vega	
2025	Pools	Blake	

=== Television ===
Year	Title	Role	Notes
2014–2015	Every Witch Way	Diego Rueda	85 episodes
2014	Every Witch Way: Spellbound	Diego Rueda	Television film
2015	Talia in the Kitchen	Diego Rueda	Episode: "Every Witch Lola's"
2015–2017	Orange Is the New Black	Benny Mendoza	5 episodes
2017	High School Lover	Larry	Television film
2017–2018	American Vandal	Peter Maldonado	16 episodes
2017	Fresh Off the Boat	Wes	Episode: "Slide Effect"
2018	The Fosters	Declan Rivers	5 episodes
2019	Veronica Mars	Juan-Diego De La Cruz	Recurring role
2021	Never Have I Ever	Malcolm Stone	Recurring role; season 2
2021	What We Do in the Shadows	Wes Blankenship	Episode: "The Cloak of Duplication"
2022	Blockbuster	Carlos Herrera	Main role
2023-2024	Ghosts	Ralph	2 episodes
