= WITS Academy =

- Genre: Fantasy; Teen drama; Telenovela; Teen comedy
- Created by: Catharina Ledeboer
- Directed by: Arturo Manuitt
- Starring: Daniela Nieves; Julia Antonelli; Jailen Bates; Kennedy Lea Slocum; Meg Crosbie; Timothy Colombos; Ryan Cargill; Lidya Jewett; Andrew Ortega; Tyler Perez; Jazzy Williams; Todd Allen Durkin
- Opening theme: "It Must Be Magic", performed by April Bender
- Country of origin: United States
- Original language: English
- No. of seasons: 1
- No. of episodes: 20

Production
- Executive producers: Tatiana Rodriguez, JC Acosta
- Producer: Fiorella Agostino
- Camera setup: Videotape; Multi-camera
- Running time: 22 minutes
- Production company: Nickelodeon Productions

Original release
- Network: Nickelodeon
- Release: October 5 – October 30, 2015

Related
- Every Witch Way; Grachi

WITS Academy is an American telenovela-formatted teen sitcom that aired on Nickelodeon from October 5, 2015 to October 30, 2015. The show, a spin-off/sequel to Every Witch Way, was announced on February 25, 2015, and was created by Catharina Ledeboer, produced by Viacom International and Cinemat Inc, executive produced by Tatiana Rodriguez and José V Scheuren. Daniela Nieves, Julia Antonelli and Todd Allen Durkin reprise their roles as Andi, Jessie and Agamemnon. On December 17, 2015, actor Todd Allen Durkin announced that he would be leaving the show, and on March 24, 2016, actress Daniela Nieves stated that the show was cancelled.

== Plot ==
Andi (Emma's best friend) is finally becoming a Guardian, as she is now training and studying at the W.I.T.S. Academy, the Magic Realm's most esteemed school for witches and wizards-in-training, or WITs. As the best friend and unofficial Guardian to the Chosen One, she will have to work hard to prove that she can live up to expectations as the first and only human Guardian. Andi is also in charge of getting two of the Academy's toughest WITs to graduation day: Jessie, Jax's little sister, and Ben, a young wizard-in-training. Andi meets other Guardians-in-training, like Luke, Lily's cousin, who becomes her love interest, Ruby, who becomes her rival, and Kim, who becomes her best friend. Luke and Andi become a couple, while Ruby is expelled from the Academy.

The Magic Realm's school for witches and wizards in training it's based in the "E.D.B. (Escuela de Brujas / Witches College) which appears on the third season of Grachi, the original TV show on which Every Witch Way is based.

== Characters ==
=== Main ===
- Andi Cruz (Daniela Nieves) is Emma's best friend who studies and trains to be the first ever human Guardian at the WITS Academy. Andi is outgoing and funny. She has a secret crush on Luke, and they become a couple at the end of the season. Her WITs are Jessie and Ben.
- Jessie Novoa (Julia Antonelli) is Jax's little sister who asks a lot of questions and can be annoying sometimes. She gained her powers in the series finale of Every Witch Way and attends the WITS Academy to learn how to use them. She understands the Hexoren. Jessie is Andi's WIT.
- Ben Davis (Jailen Bates) is a very smart wizard. He is good in theory, but not in practice, so his spells do not always succeed. He does not have much confidence in himself. Sometimes his lack of confidence is very funny. Ben is Andi's other WIT.
- Ruby Webber (Kennedy Lea Slocum): is the main antagonist of the season. She is the first powerless witch of her family, and because of this, she is insecure and a control freak. She hates Andi and is always willing to get her into trouble. Ruby takes the Dyad Tree's magic sap because it gives her powers, but this is reported to Agamemnon, who expels Ruby at the end of the season. Her WITs are Emily and Ethan.
- Emily Prescott (Meg Crosbie) is a young witch who is stubborn and determined to become stronger, due to her weak powers. Emily is Ruby's WIT in the season, although her new Guardian is unknown. She is Ethan's sister.
- Ethan Prescott (Timothy Colombos) has a natural talent for magic and likes working in a team. He never questions orders, and does whatever someone tells him to, as he is very loyal. Ethan is Ruby's WIT in the season, although his new Guardian is unknown. He is Emily's brother.
- Luke Archer (Ryan Cargill) is Lily's cousin, who belongs to a family of Guardians to Chosen Ones and wants to live up to expectations. Honest and smart, he is very competitive. He has a crush on Andi, and they become a couple at the end of the season. His WITs are Sean and Gracie, whom he cares for very much.
- Gracie Walker (Lidya Jewett) is an exuberant young witch. Gracie is Luke's WIT. She is also a very powerful witch, and because of this is very bossy and stubborn. She is a little too powerful for a young witch. She is the youngest witch at the academy. Gracie looks up to Luke, she also cares for him, like Sean.
- Sean De Soto (Andrew Ortega) is a carefree wizard who wants to have fun and make others smile. Sean is Luke's other WIT. He looks up to Luke, and cares for him, like Gracie.
- Cameron Masters (Tyler Perez): Although easily fooled, he is the best student of the WITS Academy; he is the student prefect and assistant to Agamemnon. He has a crush on Ruby, and obeys her to make her happy.
- Kim Sanders (Jazzy Williams) is a whip-smart inventor who is extremely intelligent, quick-witted and always willing to lend a hand; she is easily the smartest student in the Academy. She becomes Andi's roommate in the second episode and immediately befriends her. Her WITs are Harris and Sienna.
- Agamemnon (Todd Allen Durkin) is the current headmaster of the WITS Academy. He was the leader of the Witches' Council, but he temporarily leaves the Council to focus on his new job, where Desdemona replaces him while he is away. Although interested in his job, he isn't always fond of the WITS or Guardians-in-training, like Andi.

=== Recurring ===
- Harris (Peter Dager) is Kim's WIT, alongside Sienna.
- Sienna (Erin Whitaker): Kim's other WIT, alongside Harris.
- Amelia Foiler (Andrea Canny) is the Guardian that is a nightmare. She becomes the Academy's new coach in the seventh episode. She doesn't like Andi and tries her best to make her lose. She is revealed to be a fugitive that Leopald Archer was after. During the thirteenth episode, she is captured by Leo and Andi, loses her powers to Agamemnon, and is sent to Limbo.
- Leopald Archer (Michael St. Pierre) is Luke's uncle and a warrior from the Bad Realm. He comes to the Academy in the eleventh episode to find a fugitive, who is eventually revealed to be Miss Foiler. In the thirteenth episode, he captures her with Andi's help, then leaves, going back into the bad realm to stop the witches' bottles from happening to other wizards and witches again. He gets on with Andi quite well.
- The Hexoren (no voice) is a sentient book of spells, nicknamed "Hex". He can fly, open to a specific page on command, and somewhat communicate. Hex is first of the mother of Emma, but since she is dead Emma has the book. Hex is best friends with Andi, although he belongs to Emma. In the series finale of Every Witch Way, Emma gives Andi the book to take with her to the WITs Academy, and there the friendship is continued.

== Episodes ==
No.	Title	Directed by	Written by	Original release date	Prod. code	U.S. viewers (millions)
1	"The New Guard" "New Guardian in Town"	Arturo Manuitt	Johnny Hartmann	October 5, 2015	101	1.22
Andi arrives at the WITS Academy, where she meets a few people, like her roommate Samantha and Samantha's best friend Ruby. Andi then discovers she is the Guardian to Jessie and another young wizard named Ben. Guest stars: Bianca Matthews as Samantha Note: The episode begins right where the Every Witch Way series finale episode ended.
2	"The Jinx"	Arturo Manuitt	Zach Luna	October 6, 2015	102	1.37
After the Spell Performance Test, Samantha gets expelled, but Kim, another Guardian, becomes Andi's new roommate. During the second test, Ben is having a hard time. Jessie will not practice with Andi and runs off, avoiding Andi by making herself super-fast and giving everyone her look. Guest stars: Bianca Matthews as Samantha
3	"The Root of All Evil"	Arturo Manuitt	Johnny Hartmann	October 7, 2015	103	1.32
Ruby enters a room where she finds magic sap that gives her powers. Meanwhile, when Emily and Ethan make attempt to make a cake disappear in the cafeteria, causing many mishaps, Andi and Ruby are both accused. Ruby then wants to return to the room with the sap. Luke tells Andi that she and her WITS can copy what he and his WITS do, but Andi's team struggles, and Ben hurts his wrist.
4	"Hide and Go Hex"	Arturo Manuitt	Zach Luna	October 8, 2015	104	1.25
Andi and Jessie search for Hex after Ruby, Emily and Ethan steal him. Meanwhile, Ben practices with Luke, Sean and Gracie. During the Blockers Finals, the healing spell Jessie cast on Ben's wrist in the previous episode wears off, and Cameron finds out about the spell and tells Agamemnon, who takes Jessie's powers and disqualifies Andi, Ben and Jessie from the Blockers.
5	"Switcherooed"	Arturo Manuitt	Johnny Hartmann	October 9, 2015	105	1.39
When Ethan opens the Switcheroo bottle, it makes him and Emily switch bodies. Jessie is mad at Andi and wants to go home and have Jax become her new Guardian, but Andi wants to make it up to her by getting Jessie's powers back. Andi has to do chores as punishment for telling Jessie to use her powers, and while she does, Ruby asks her to help Ethan and Emily because Ethan switched their bodies. Later, Luke asks the Guardians to meet so Sean and Gracie can undo the spell.
6	"Power Trip"	Arturo Manuitt	Zach Luna	October 13, 2015	106	1.29
When Ruby takes much of the magic sap from the Dyad Tree's roots, leaves fall onto the atrium ground. Andi shows one of the leaves to Agamemnon, who says that the tree connects the Magic Realm and Human World, and the tree must stay healthy to keep this connection. Andi still tries to get Jessie's powers back in the meantime. Meanwhile, Jessie's Captain El Capitañ comic sparks a friendship between her and Ethan, while Cameron finds a way to get Agamemnon to the "crown" of the Dyad tree to inspect it.
7	"Sparring Partners"	Arturo Manuitt	Johnny Hartmann	October 14, 2015	107	1.29
The Academy's new coach was in a recent nightmare Jessie had. Miss Foiler despises Andi and acts super hard towards her. Meanwhile, Andi has agreed to help fix a lift so she could get Jessie's powers back, while Ben tries to be cool like Luke, and Jessie and Ethan still bond over Captain El Capitañ, making Emily mad. Luke then helps Andi with the Guardians' fitness finals, but unintentionally gets them both trapped outside the Academy after missing curfew.
8	"No Pain, No Gain"	Arturo Manuitt	Zach Luna	October 15, 2015	108	1.24
Agamemnon transports Andi and Luke back into the Academy and punishes them for passing curfew by giving them detention in the library, where they train for the Guardians' fitness finals. Meanwhile, Miss Foiler trains the witches and wizards-in-training, and Ben hangs with Sean and Gracie, starting a smoothie business with them, while Ruby and Emily train together. Ruby applies a Strength Spell on herself, causing her to break virtually anything she touches. Later, Emily steals Jessie's Captain El Capitañ comic, escalating the feud between them.
9	"Finish Line"	Arturo Manuitt	Johnny Hartmann	October 16, 2015	109	1.42
Emily takes some of Ruby's magic sap, making herself more powerful; soon, she and Jessie have a magic face-off. Meanwhile, the Guardians and WITs are ready for the Guardians' fitness finals, but Ruby casts a spell on Andi that makes her clumsy, and Miss Foiler edits the course on Andi and her WITs' run to prevent them from completing. Despite these, Jessie and Ben use their powers to undo Ruby's spell and rid the obstacles, and Andi's team sets a new record in the finals; for this, Andi gets the Guardian Amulet, while Jessie and Ben get ice cream. At the end of the episode, Luke asks Andi out on a date.
10	"Who's My WIT"	Arturo Manuitt	Zach Luna	October 19, 2015	110	1.09
The teams receive a new assignment where they must creates shields that repel magic. However, this assignment pairs the Guardians with different WITs: Luke's new WITs are Harris and Sienna (Kim's WITs), Andi is paired with Ethan and Emily, Jessie and Ben are Ruby's WITs, and Gracie and Sean team up with Kim. Being in third place drives Ruby to make a harsh shield, so Ben and Jessie seek Cameron's help. Meanwhile, because Andi rejected Luke's date offer, Sean and Gracie plan to get her to accept it by casting a spell on him.
11	"Witch Hunt"	Arturo Manuitt	Johnny Hartmann	October 20, 2015	111	1.16
Agamemnon encounters Leopald Archer, a warrior from the Bad Realm. Leo mentors the Guardian shield construction and Spell Attack class, while he searches for a mysterious fugitive. Meanwhile, Andi changes her mind about going out with Luke, as the Guardians test their shields. Luke promises to meet Andi at the Dyad Tree, but as Leo is his uncle, he keeps Luke from fulfilling his promise, making her angry.
12	"Bizarro Ruby"	Arturo Manuitt	Zach Luna	October 21, 2015	112	1.21
Ruby casts a docile spell on Andi, but Andi shields the spell, which hits Ruby and forces her act nice, unnerving Andi and Kim. The Guardian Amulet, which Andi has put on her shield, also erases Ruby's memory. Andi and Kim must now figure out why Ruby has powers. Meanwhile, Leo believes Cameron is the fugitive and enlists Miss Foiler's help to see if it is true, while Jessie and Ben use Cameron's spell checker to see the spell on Ruby, and they undo it. Later, Miss Foiler removes the Guardian Amulet from Andi's shield to prevent her from winning the Shield Trials.
13	"Her Darkest Secret"	Arturo Manuitt	Johnny Hartmann	October 22, 2015	113	1.32
For the Shield Trials, the WITs return to their old Guardians. Leo, Cameron and Agamemnon follows the moves of Miss Foiler, who was revealed in the previous episode to be the true fugitive. Meanwhile, Andi decides to work with Leo to capture Miss Foiler so she can get her Amulet back, and they go to the room where the Dyad Tree's roots are. The Guardians and WITs then compete in the Shield Trials. After, Leo and Andi finally capture Miss Foiler and take her to Agamemnon to send her back to Limbo. Meanwhile, Emily reveals to Ruby that she knew the location of the Roots Chamber, where she takes Ruby; Emily also says that her powers are very weak and that she relies on the magic sap, too. Andi, Agamemnon and Leo see that the Dyad Tree is losing its powers, and when Andi follows Leo's order to return to her dormroom, she sees that a familiar face has arrived for her help.
14	"My Buddy from Orlando"	Arturo Manuitt	Zach Luna	October 23, 2015	114	1.18
Andi has ironically run into Emma, who says she is in danger and needs Andi's help; Emma shows Andi magic sparkles on her arm. While the two figure out what this means, Emma disguises as Felicia, a girl from Orlando, so no one will know that the Chosen One is at the Academy, but Jessie recognizes her, and so does Luke. Meanwhile, Ruby plans to cast an exile spell on Andi, asking for Emily's help, while the WITs attend Cam Camp, a camp run by Cameron. Later, after curfew, Agamemnon, Leo, Emma, Andi, Luke, Jessie and Ben use their energy to restore the Dyad Tree, which also makes the sparkles on Emma's arm disappear. Emma leaves afterwards because she must check on her human friends. Ruby and Emily then cast the exile spell, but hit both Leo and Andi, sending them on a drifting raft. Special guest stars: Paola Andino as Emma Alonso
15	"Wonky Andi"	Arturo Manuitt	Johnny Hartmann	October 26, 2015	115	1.18
On the raft, Leo sees that he and Andi are heading towards the Bad Realm. However, they manage to reach shore. Meanwhile, Ruby decides to make an Andi copy, and she, Emily and Ethan cast a replication spell on a photo of Andi to do so, while the WITs train for the upcoming Magic Melee. Eventually, Jessie and Ben discover that "Andi" isn't the real Andi.
16	"The Witch's Bottle"	Arturo Manuitt	Zach Luna	October 27, 2015	116	1.24
Jessie and Ben tell Kim that Andi is a clone, and the three seek the help of Luke, while Andi and Leo learn about the shack they are trapped in. Kim finds a location spell in Hex and Jessie casts it. The group then decides to look for a signal from Andi. Meanwhile, Ruby plans to use "Wonky Andi" to frame Andi for hurting the Dyad Tree. Andi and Leo see the shack's caretaker, but Ben successfully goes through a portal Sean and Gracie make (and Jessie helps hold), and they all return to the Academy. Leo then gives Andi his magic muffler and returns to the Bad Realm. At the end of the episode, Ruby shows Agamemnon the pictures she took of Wonky Andi, and he expels the real Andi.
17	"On Trial"	Arturo Manuitt	Johnny Hartmann	October 28, 2015	117	1.35
After what happened in the previous episode, Jessie and Ben tell Agamemnon that Andi is right about what Ruby did, and he says that she has until the end of the day to have proof of this. Ethan finally tells Andi, Jessie and Ben that Ruby has been taking the Dyad Tree's sap, and the team figures out that this is the reason of the tree's injury. They then try to find the magic sap, while also training for the Magic Melee; Kim, however, won't help Andi. Later, Luke, Sean and Gracie help Andi prove her innocence, as Sean and Gracie show evidence, and Agamemnon finally believes this, excluding Ruby's team from the Magic Melee. Upset about this, Ruby prohibits Emily from using her sap, Emily teleports Ethan to the Roots Chamber, where he gets more sap. However, he cannot get out.
18	"Cameron Rules"	Arturo Manuitt	Zach Luna	October 29, 2015	118	1.25
Ethan is stuck in the Roots Chamber, as the Dyad Tree is absorbing his powers. Cameron, in the meantime, has forgotten to write Agamemnon's speech for the Magic Melee, so Ruby tells him that they can get a memory wiping spell so Ruby's team can be part in the Melee, and Camron can earn a "stripe" for writing the speech; however, they turn Agamemnon to stone. While Emily asks for Jessie's help to find Ethan, and they go to the Roots Chamber, where Jessie casts a spell on the force field blocking the entrance and Ethan goes through it, Ruby has Cameron become a fake headmaster until Agamemnon returns to normal. Meanwhile, Andi suddenly sees that the Dyad Tree is rotting, while she and her team practice karate before making a Karate Chop Spell. Ruby then disguises Cameron as Agamemnon before he gives the speech to the students. After he changes back, Cameron tells Agamemnon the truth, and he allows Ruby's team back into the Magic Melee.
19–20	"It Must Be Magic"	Arturo Manuitt	Johnny Hartmann & Zach Luna	October 30, 2015	119–120	1.20
In the series finale, Andi finds Ruby's magic sap in Cameron's room and figures out that it is the source of Ruby's powers. Cameron then sees that the Dyad Tree is dying. Andi finally tells Agamemnon about the sap, and he says that all witches and wizards in the human world are getting the same sparkles Emma had. He then tells Andi to call Emma, while later telling Cameron to watch Ruby. Meanwhile, the teams fight in the Magic Melee. Ruby's team gets Spell Armor, which Cameron gave Ruby, to protect themselves, while attacking Andi's team. After the first round, Andi and Luke's teams are the last ones standing. During intermission, Agamemnon and Cameron check on the Dyad Tree, and Cameron makes sure no one gets near the tree, but Ruby gets more of the tree's magic and gets trapped inside it instead; Cameron tells Agamemnon, Emily and Ethan follow him. Emily touches the tree and gets trapped inside as well, so Agamemnon tells Ethan to get help. Andi's team eventually wins the Magic Melee, and later, Emma calls her and she says that the magic sparkles on her arm are back, and they are also on Jax, so the Guardians and WITs enter the atrium, with the chances to save Ruby, Emily, the tree and the Magic Realm in their hands. Andi wants to go inside the tree, so Luke devises a plan to have her do so: The Guardians shield the shots the tree makes as Gracie and Ben cast a distraction spell, and then Andi touches the tree, going inside to free Ruby and Emily. Emily opens a bottle that allows Jessie, Ethan and Ben to free them with a spell cause her powers got strong enough. Luke leads all the WITs Academy students in giving their energy to heal the tree. Andi and Jessie then call Emma and Jax to see if they're okay, and they are. Agamemnon punishes Ruby for putting the Dyad Tree and all the witches and wizards of the Magic Realm in danger by expelling her from the Academy. Cameron gets sad about this, but Ruby says, "You haven't seen the last of me," and kisses him on the cheek. To celebrate the Melee's victors (Andi's team), the Academy holds a carnival. At the carnival, however, Agamemnon also thanks Andi, Jessie, Ben, Luke, Sean, Gracie, Ethan, Emily and Kim for saving the Academy and Magic Realm from danger, giving them medals. Later, Andi talks to Luke about what happened on her first day at the Academy, and says that she wants to make changes in the next semester. She then mentions that she is missing something, something she was afraid of doing, and finally, she and Luke kiss for the first time. At the end of the final episode, the caretaker, who Leo and Andi saw in the sixteenth episode, enters the shack and finds Andi's earring, saying, "I will find you, Andi Cruz", although it is unknown how the caretaker came to know Andi.

== Broadcast ==
W.I.T.S. Academy premiered on Nickelodeon in the UK and Ireland on January 5, 2016. It premiered on TeenNick in the U.S. on February 21, 2016. It premiered on Nickelodeon in the Netherlands and Belgium on February 29, 2016.
