= National Register of Historic Places listings in Obion County, Tennessee =

Location of Obion County in Tennessee

This is a list of the National Register of Historic Places listings in Obion County, Tennessee.

This is intended to be a complete list of the properties and districts on the National Register of Historic Places in Obion County, Tennessee, United States. Latitude and longitude coordinates are provided for many National Register properties and districts; these locations may be seen together in a map.

There are 16 properties and districts listed on the National Register in the county. Another 4 properties were once listed but have been removed.

Contents: Counties in Tennessee
Anderson – Bedford – Benton – Bledsoe – Blount – Bradley – Campbell – Cannon – Carroll – Carter – Cheatham – Chester – Claiborne – Clay – Cocke – Coffee – Crockett – Cumberland – Davidson – Decatur – DeKalb – Dickson – Dyer – Fayette – Fentress – Franklin – Gibson – Giles – Grainger – Greene – Grundy – Hamblen – Hamilton – Hancock – Hardeman – Hardin – Hawkins – Haywood – Henderson – Henry – Hickman – Houston – Humphreys – Jackson – Jefferson – Johnson – Knox – Lake – Lauderdale – Lawrence – Lewis – Lincoln – Loudon – Macon – Madison – Marion – Marshall – Maury – McMinn – McNairy – Meigs – Monroe – Montgomery – Moore – Morgan – Obion – Overton – Perry – Pickett – Polk – Putnam – Rhea – Roane – Robertson – Rutherford – Scott – Sequatchie – Sevier – Shelby – Smith – Stewart – Sullivan – Sumner – Tipton – Trousdale – Unicoi – Union – Van Buren – Warren – Washington – Wayne – Weakley – White – Williamson – Wilson

This National Park Service list is complete through NPS recent listings posted February 6, 2026.

== Current listings ==
	Name on the Register	Image	Date listed	Location	City or town	Description
1	Thomas Leroy Bransford House	Thomas Leroy Bransford House	August 4, 1995 (#95000977)	815 N. Ury St. 36°25′56″N 89°03′07″W	Union City	
2	Caldwell Lustron House	Caldwell Lustron House	June 25, 1999 (#99000718)	1020 E. Church St. 36°25′25″N 89°02′43″W	Union City	
3	Capitol Theatre	Capitol Theatre	March 18, 1999 (#99000363)	118 S. 1st St. 36°25′30″N 89°03′25″W	Union City	
4	Confederate Monument	Confederate Monument	July 28, 1977 (#77001286)	Summer and Edwards Sts. 36°25′16″N 89°02′51″W	Union City	
5	Deering Building	Deering Building	November 25, 1983 (#83004283)	106 1st St. 36°25′31″N 89°03′25″W	Union City	
6	East Main Street and Exchange Street Historic District	East Main Street and Exchange Street Historic District	November 22, 1999 (#99001394)	Roughly along Main, Exchange, and Church Sts. 36°25′30″N 89°02′58″W	Union City	
7	Houser House	Houser House	July 17, 2002 (#02000809)	2221 Old Troy Rd. 36°25′04″N 89°05′12″W	Union City	
8	W.W. Morris House	W.W. Morris House	January 27, 1983 (#83003058)	305 W. State Line Rd. 36°29′59″N 88°53′09″W	South Fulton	
9	Mt. Zion Colored Methodist Episcopal Church	Mt. Zion Colored Methodist Episcopal Church	February 16, 2001 (#01000140)	Southeastern corner of the junction of College and Greenwood Sts. 36°25′42″N 89°02′40″W	Union City	
10	Obion County Courthouse	Obion County Courthouse	March 30, 1995 (#95000340)	Junction of 3rd and Washington Sts. 36°25′24″N 89°03′34″W	Union City	
11	Railroad Park	Railroad Park	May 5, 1999 (#99000535)	100 Park St. 36°25′26″N 89°03′23″W	Union City	
12	Union City Armory	Union City Armory	March 18, 1999 (#99000361)	415 W. Main St. 36°25′34″N 89°03′38″W	Union City	
13	Union City, Mobile and Ohio Railroad Depot	Union City, Mobile and Ohio Railroad Depot	July 28, 1995 (#95000933)	214 E. Church St. 36°25′28″N 89°03′20″W	Union City	
14	US Post Office	US Post Office	May 31, 1984 (#84003671)	114 W. Washington; 36°25′22″N 89°03′29″W	Union City	
15	Washington Avenue and Florida Avenue Historic District	Washington Avenue and Florida Avenue Historic District	September 1, 2001 (#01000955)	Located along Washington And Florida Aves., between 3rd and 5th Sts. 36°25′24″N 89°03′37″W	Union City	
16	Jesse Whitesell Farm	Jesse Whitesell Farm	February 4, 2009 (#77000619)	Southern side of Kentucky Route 116 west of the Purchase Parkway; 36°30′05″N 88°54′04″W	South Fulton	A boundary increase of the Jesse Whitesell House in Fulton County, Kentucky

== Former listing ==
	Name on the Register	Image	Date listed	Date removed	Location	City or town	Description
1	Central Elementary School	Central Elementary School	February 16, 2001 (#01000141)	November 24, 2015	512 E. College St. 36°25′46″N 89°03′07″W	Union City	
2	Colored Hotel	Colored Hotel	August 11, 2008 (#08000284)	March 22, 2016	208 Nash St. 36°25′36″N 89°02′33″W	Union City	
3	Dickey's Octagonal Barbershop	Dickey's Octagonal Barbershop	April 29, 1975 (#75001772)	November 27, 2019	Southwestern corner of the junction of High and N. Church Sts. 36°21′32″N 89°02′56″W	Rives	
4	Parks Covered Bridge		November 27, 1978 (#78002624)	March 13, 1998	North of Trimble off U.S. Route 51; 36°12′17″N 89°11′30″W	Trimble vicinity	Moved to 107 Parks St. in 1997. Coordinates are at current location.

== See also ==
- List of National Historic Landmarks in Tennessee
- National Register of Historic Places listings in Tennessee
