= 1997 in American television =

In American television in 1997, notable events included television show debuts, finales, cancellations, and channel initiations, closures, and rebrandings, as well as information about controversies and disputes.

== Events ==
Date	Event
January 1	The TV Parental Guidelines, a television rating system, a system similar to the one used for motion pictures, goes into effect.
January 1	The Emergency Alert System comes into effect and replaces the Emergency Broadcast System.
January 3	Bryant Gumbel anchors his last Today show on NBC. The following Monday, Matt Lauer takes over alongside Katie Couric until he was fired 20 years later in November 2017.
January 12	King of the Hill set to series premiere on Fox.
January 22	New World Communications is acquired by Fox. The deal makes 10 New World-owned stations that affiliated with Fox as a result of the 1994 United States broadcast TV realignment network O&O's.
January 26	Fox broadcasts its first Super Bowl, making it the last of the big four networks to air a Super Bowl. The Green Bay Packers defeat the New England Patriots 35–21 in a game that gives Fox its highest ratings to date.
February 1	The final affiliation switch resulting from the 1994–96 United States broadcast TV realignment takes place when Allbritton Communications (owners of WJLA-TV in Washington, D.C., one of the strongest ABC affiliates in the country) converts WB affiliate WBSG in Brunswick, Georgia, into a semi-satellite of new sign-on WJXX in Orange Park, Florida, which assumes the ABC affiliation for the Jacksonville market. Former ABC affiliate WJKS promptly discontinues its news operation and assumes the WB affiliation from WBSG.
February 9	On Fox, The Simpsons airs the episode "The Itchy & Scratchy & Poochie Show". With this episode, The Simpsons surpasses The Flintstones as the longest-running primetime animated series in terms of episodes aired.
February 23	Schindler's List makes its network television debut on NBC. The film is broadcast virtually unedited and is the first telecast to receive a TV-M (now TV-MA) rating under the TV Parental Guidelines that had been established earlier in the year.
February 26	Various ABC characters appeared with Las Vegas settings in the shows Grace Under Fire, Coach, The Drew Carey Show, and Ellen.
February 28	After 23 years, the game show Wheel of Fortune retires their old trilon puzzle board and replaces it with a new touch screen puzzle board.
March 17	The programming block Toonami debuts on Cartoon Network.
March 23	The 13th annual WrestleMania event airs on pay-per-view. While the event as a whole receives mixed reviews, the submission match between Bret Hart and Stone Cold Steve Austin, in which both wrestlers switch alignments, is highly praised, being called one of the greatest matches in wrestling history, and has been cited by some as the beginning of the Attitude Era.
April 6	Disney Channel changes its network branding and presents the cable television premiere of the 1995 Disney animated film Pocahontas. The film would have its network television premiere on ABC one year later. Disney Channel continues to convert from subscription television to a basic cable channel.
April 13	Extreme Championship Wrestling broadcasts its first ever pay-per-view dubbed "Barely Legal".
April 19	The 1997 Kids' Choice Awards air on Nickelodeon, hosted by Rosie O'Donnell. Television winners included Home Improvement (for "Favorite TV Show"), Tim Allen (of Home Improvement for "Favorite TV Actor"), Tia and Tamera Mowry (of Sister, Sister for "Favorite TV Actress") and Rugrats (for "Favorite Cartoon"). A half-hour sneak preview of The Angry Beavers follows the ceremony.
April 25	CBS broadcasts a reunion film featuring the surviving cast of The Dukes of Hazzard, which originally aired on the network from 1979 to 1985. This proved to be Denver Pyle's final performance before his death on Christmas Day, 1997.
April 30	The Ellen episode "The Puppy Episode" is broadcast on ABC, showing for the first time the revelation of a main character as a homosexual.
May 7–9	CBS broadcasts a two part miniseries that reunites the cast of the prime time soap opera Knots Landing, which originally ran on the network from 1979–1993.
May 9	Bob Saget hosts his final regular episode of America's Funniest Home Videos on ABC, with the other cast members of Full House, minus The Olsen Twins. The $100,000 season finale (his final episode) aired nine days later on May 18.
June 6	Farrah Fawcett makes a bizarre appearance on CBS's Late Show with David Letterman. Fawcett tells long, rambling stories without a purpose, fails to understand simple questions, and gets easily distracted by things like blinking lights on the set.
June 21	The Professional Bowlers Tour ends after 36 years on ABC. CBS assumes the rights to the tour and will televise several events over the next two years.
June 30	In Seattle, KIRO-TV (CBS) and KSTW (UPN) reverse their 1995 network affiliation swap.
July 8	KONG-TV, Seattle's independent station goes on the air.
July 8	Fox broadcasts the Major League Baseball All-Star Game from Cleveland, marking the first time that the network would broadcast the midsummer classic.
July 14–16	Cartoon Network launches the "Cartoon Cartoons" brand with the debut of three animated series, Johnny Bravo, Cow and Chicken and I Am Weasel, as well as the season two premiere of Dexter's Laboratory.
July 15	A tribute episode of Another World is broadcast on NBC in honor of Victoria Wyndham's 25 years with the program.
July 24	George Harrison appears on a VH-1 special to promote his friend Ravi Shankar's album Chants of India. This would prove to be Harrison's final television appearance.
August 13	South Park premieres on Comedy Central.
August 31	WFFF-TV in Burlington, Vermont, signs-on the air, giving the Burlington/Plattsburgh market its first full-time Fox affiliate (prior to this, Fox programming was seen on a secondary basis on CBS affiliate WCAX-TV).
September 3	Jeri Ryan makes her first appearance as Seven of Nine on UPN's Star Trek: Voyager.
September 5	Joan Lunden makes her final appearance as co-anchor for ABC's Good Morning America, after being on the program since 1980. Lunden would be succeeded by Lisa McRee.
September 6	The big three television networks, Fox, and cable networks CNN, E!, Fox News and MSNBC all broadcast the funeral of Diana, Princess of Wales; more than 33 million viewers at home watched this special.
September 8	KDAF-TV gives up the rights on Fox Kids to KDFI, as KDFW airs news, talk shows, paid/real estate and E/I-complaint programming instead of the block (KDFI also airs said programs, as well as Fox programs, just in case for local news emergencies and sports preemptions).
September 13	ABC revamps its Saturday morning cartoon schedule, and adds more new series from parent company Disney to become Disney's One Saturday Morning. This, along with many other programming, was delayed one week from its originally planned debut as a result of the aforementioned Princess Diana funeral.
September 14	The 49th Primetime Emmy Awards presentation was broadcast on CBS.
September 19	After several years of being a part of ABC's successful "TGIF" sitcom programming block, Family Matters and Step by Step switch to CBS to form the basis of the "CBS Block Party", a direct competitor to TGIF. Both series, as well as the Block Party, would be cancelled after one season.
September 25	ER produces a live episode for its fourth season premiere on NBC.
October 5	The World Wrestling Federation event Badd Blood: In Your House is broadcast on pay-per-view. Not only is the event notable for featuring the promotion's first-ever Hell in a Cell match, which pitted The Undertaker against Shawn Michaels and saw the debut of Undertaker's storyline brother Kane, it marked the last time that Vince McMahon would be featured as the chief broadcaster of the commentating team for a pay-per-view event. According to WWE, the Montreal Screwjob, which took place at Survivor Series 1997, is considered the beginning of the Attitude Era. Thus, Badd Blood: In Your House was the last WWF PPV of the New Generation Era.
October 20	Arthur begins its second season on PBS with Fred Rogers from Mister Rogers' Neighborhood guest starring.
October 25	Chris Farley guest hosts NBC's Saturday Night Live in what would turn out to be his final television appearance before his death on December 18, 1997.
October 25	Under Wraps, the first Disney Channel Original Movie (DCOM) by Disney Channel, is broadcast.
October 26	Game 7 of the World Series is broadcast on NBC. The Florida Marlins defeat the Cleveland Indians, becoming the first baseball wild card team to win the world championship. This was the first World Series that NBC would broadcast in its entirety since 1988. NBC aired only Games 2-3 and the decisive sixth game of the 1995 World Series, while ABC aired the other three and a seventh game had it been necessary.
November 2	A third production of Richard Rodgers and Oscar Hammerstein II's version of Cinderella is aired on ABC. This version, featuring Brandy Norwood and Whitney Houston, is produced by ABC's parent company The Walt Disney Company (which released its own version of the story as an animated movie 1950).
November 6	The NBC discussion show Meet the Press celebrates its 50th anniversary.
November 7	A crossover event featuring Salem in a time ball with Sabrina appeared on all four TGIF shows around that time, Sabrina the Teenage Witch, Boy Meets World, You Wish, and Teen Angel.
November 9	During a pay-per-view broadcast of the World Wrestling Federation's Survivor Series, then-WWF Champion Bret Hart loses his title to Shawn Michaels. The finish is mired in controversy when WWF chairman Vince McMahon, who had been sitting at ringside, orders Earl Hebner, the assigned referee, to end the match as Michaels is holding Hart in Hart's own finishing maneuver, the Sharpshooter, even though Hart had not submitted. The incident becomes known as the Montreal Screwjob and will mark the final appearance of Hart on WWE television until 2010.
November 17	Rick Rude becomes the only person to appear on both USA Network's Raw and TNT's Monday Nitro on the same night. Whereas the Raw that aired that night was pre-recorded six days in advanced, Rude appeared on a live edition of Nitro about an hour earlier.
November 29	The Emergency Broadcast System is replaced by the Emergency Alert System and it continues to this day.
December 8	WVIT becomes an NBC O&O for the second time, and Paramount Stations Group had purchased WLWC and WWHO, dropping off newscasts, although Paramount had to run these two as a WB affiliate until 2000, while getting UPN to secondary status.
December 15	World Wrestling Federation chairman Vince McMahon announces the introduction of the Attitude Era (a term used by WWF for its adult-oriented programming) on Raw Is War, during a segment entitled "The Cure for the Common Show". The WWF Attitude's scratch logo also makes its on-screen debut within the episode, replacing the New Generation's block logo.
December 24	TNT and TBS broadcast "24 Hours of A Christmas Story", consisting of 12 consecutive airings of the 1983 film from the evening of Christmas Eve to the evening of Christmas Day.
December 28	World Championship Wrestling's fifteenth annual Starrcade event airs on pay-per-view. The main event would see Sting defeat Hollywood Hogan to win the WCW World Heavyweight Championship. Overall, this would become the highest grossing pay-per-view in WCW history.

== Programs ==
=== Debuts ===
Date	Show	Network
January 1	Cooking Live	Food Network
January 4	Lost on Earth	USA Network
January 6	Sunset Beach	NBC
January 7	Orleans	CBS
January 8	Chicago Sons	NBC
January 9	Antiques Roadshow	PBS
January 12	King of the Hill	Fox
January 13	La Femme Nikita	USA Network
January 13	The New Adventures of Robin Hood	TNT
January 19	Emeril Live	Food Network
February 7	The Chris Rock Show	HBO
February 24	Earth's Fury	The Learning Channel
February 28	Crisis Center	NBC
March 2	The Country Mouse and the City Mouse Adventures	HBO
March 3	Daria	MTV
March 3	Pauly	Fox
March 3	Spy Game	ABC
March 4	Just Shoot Me!	NBC
March 4	The Practice	ABC
March 5	Arsenio	ABC
March 5	Temporarily Yours	CBS
March 6	Prince Street	NBC
March 10	Buffy the Vampire Slayer	The WB
March 18	Social Studies	UPN
March 22	Lawless	Fox
April 1	Religion & Ethics Newsweekly	PBS
April 1	Viva Variety	Comedy Central
April 2	Smart Guy	The WB
April 9	Pacific Palisades	Fox
April 10	Fired Up	NBC
April 12	Gun	ABC
April 12	Leaving L.A.	ABC
April 14	¡Despierta América!	Univision
April 15	Soul Man	ABC
April 19	Nightmare Ned	ABC
April 19	The Angry Beavers	Nickelodeon
April 19	Power Rangers Turbo	Fox Kids
May 16	Todd McFarlane's Spawn	HBO
May 25	Beyond Belief: Fact or Fiction	Fox
June 2	Port Charles	ABC
June 6	Life... and Stuff	CBS
June 7	CNN NewsStand	CNN
June 7	Perversions of Science	HBO
July 7	Figure It Out	Nickelodeon
July 11	Spicy City	HBO
July 12	Oz	HBO
July 14	Roar	Fox
July 14	Johnny Bravo	Cartoon Network
July 15	Cow and Chicken	Cartoon Network
July 15	I Am Weasel	Cartoon Network
July 21	Mission Genesis	Sci-Fi Channel
July 27	Stargate SG-1	Showtime
July 28	Win Ben Stein's Money	Comedy Central
August 4	USA High	USA Network
August 11	The View	ABC
August 13	South Park	Comedy Central
August 17	Behind the Music	VH1
August 17	The World's Funniest!	Fox
August 25	Good News	UPN
August 26	Head over Heels	UPN
August 26	Hitz	UPN
September 1	101 Dalmatians: The Series	Syndication
September 1	Fox News Watch	Fox News Channel
September 1	MTV Live	MTV
September 1	Pensacola: Wings of Gold	USA Network
September 1	Extreme Dinosaurs	Syndication
September 6	Click	Syndication
September 6	City Guys	NBC
September 7	Alright Already	The WB
September 7	The Tom Show	The WB
September 7	Popular Mechanics for Kids	Syndication
September 8	Ally McBeal	Fox
September 11	Between Brothers	Fox
September 11	413 Hope St.	Fox
September 12	Ninja Turtles: The Next Mutation	Fox Kids
September 12	Police Academy: The Series	Syndication
September 13	Pepper Ann	ABC
September 13	Recess	ABC
September 13	Science Court	ABC
September 13	The Crayon Box	Syndication
September 13	The Legend of Calamity Jane	Kids' WB
September 13	The New Batman Adventures	Kids' WB
September 13	The New Batman/Superman Adventures	Kids' WB
September 13	The Weird Al Show	CBS
September 13	Wheel 2000	CBS
September 13	Fudge	CBS
September 13	The New Ghostwriter Mysteries	CBS
September 14	Going Wild with Jeff Corwin	Disney Channel
September 15	Breaker High	UPN
September 15	George & Leo	CBS
September 15	The Gregory Hines Show	CBS
September 15	Michael Hayes	CBS
September 15	The Mr. Men Show	Syndication
September 18	Cracker	ABC
September 18	Nothing Sacred	ABC
September 19	The Visitor	Fox
September 19	Meego	CBS
September 20	The New Adventures of Zorro	Syndication
September 22	Timecop	ABC
September 22	The Ink and Paint Club	Disney Channel
September 22	Brooklyn South	CBS
September 23	Dellaventura	CBS
September 23	Hiller and Diller	ABC
September 24	Public Eye with Bryant Gumbel	CBS
September 24	Dharma & Greg	ABC
September 24	Built to Last	NBC
September 24	The Tony Danza Show	NBC
September 25	Veronica's Closet	NBC
September 25	Union Square	NBC
September 26	Teen Angel	ABC
September 26	You Wish	ABC
September 27	Soldier of Fortune, Inc.	Syndication
September 27	Total Security	NBC
September 28	Jenny	NBC
September 29	The Big Garage	TLC
October 1	Amp	MTV
October 1	Daily News Live	CSN Philadelphia
October 1	SportsDay	CSN Philadelphia
October 1	SportsNite	CSN Philadelphia
October 1	SportsRise	CSN Philadelphia
October 1	Wimzie's House	PTV
October 4	The Adventures of Sam & Max: Freelance Police	Fox Kids
October 4	Fame L.A.	Syndication
October 6	Earth: Final Conflict	Syndication
October 6	Team Knight Rider	Syndication
October 6	The Edge	CNBC
October 8	Working	NBC
October 10	Raging Planet	Discovery Channel
October 11	C-16: FBI	ABC
October 11	Men in Black: The Series	Kids' WB
October 17	Players	NBC
October 17	Cartoon Sushi	MTV
October 20	Bear in the Big Blue House	Disney Channel
October 20	Channel Umptee-3	Kids' WB
October 21	Over the Top	ABC
November 1	Sleepwalkers	NBC
November 4	Autoline Detroit	WTVS
November 4	Cartoon Sushi	MTV
November 4	Enjoying Everyday Life	Syndication
November 4	My Classic Car	TNN
November 8	The Journey of Allen Strange	Nickelodeon
November 28	Tenacious D	HBO

=== Milestone episodes and anniversaries ===
Show	Network	Episode #	Episode title	Episode airdate	Source
Jeopardy!	Syndication	3,000th episode	"Show #3000"	September 26	

=== Returning this year ===
Show	Last aired	Previous network	New title	New network	Returned
Rugrats	1994	Nickelodeon	Same	Same	August 23
The People's Court	1993	Syndication	Same	Same	September 8
Batman: The Animated Series	1995	Fox	The New Batman Adventures	Kids' WB	September 13
Muppets Tonight	1996	ABC	Same	Disney Channel	September 13
The Wonderful World of Disney	1996	Disney Channel	Same	ABC	September 28

=== Ending this year ===
Date	Show	Debut
January 1	Kung Fu: The Legend Continues	1993
January 3	Small Talk	1996
January 17	Mighty Ducks: The Animated Series	1996
January 27	Ned & Stacey	1995
January 27	Space Cases	1996
January 31	Wait 'til You Have Kids	1996
February 15	Gargoyles	1994
February 22	C Bear and Jamal	1996
February 22	Road Rovers	1996
February 24	Savannah	1996
March 8	The Mouse and the Monster	1996
March 15	Dangerous Minds	1996
March 16	WWF on MSG Network	1976
March 26	What a Cartoon! (returned in 2000)	1995
March 28	The City	1995
March 30	Life with Roger	1996
April 2	Lost on Earth	1997
April 2	EZ Streets	1996
April 4	Dragon Flyz	1996
April 4	Crisis Center	1997
April 7	Pauly	1997
April 10	Orleans	1997
April 12	The Twisted Tales of Felix the Cat	1995
April 14	Relativity	1996
April 16	The Real Adventures of Jonny Quest	1996
April 23	Arsenio	1997
May 1	Martin	1992
May 13	Homeboys in Outer Space	1996
May 14	Coach	1989
May 14	Street Fighter	1995
May 16	Baywatch Nights	1995
May 17	Waynehead	1996
May 18	Brotherly Love	1995
May 19	The Cape	1996
May 19	Goode Behavior	1996
May 19	Ink	1996
May 20	The Burning Zone	1996
May 20	Roseanne (returned in 2018)	1988
May 21	Wings	1990
May 22	Moloney	1996
May 30	Caryl & Marilyn: Real Friends	1996
May 31	Dark Skies	1996
May 31	Gun	1997
June 1	Freakazoid!	1995
June 9	Married... with Children	1987
June 14	Lois & Clark: The New Adventures of Superman	1993
June 17	Deadly Games	1995
June 21	Captain Simian & the Space Monkeys	1996
June 25	Pearl	1996
June 25	MTV Sports	1992
June 27	Dave's World	1993
July 2	Chicago Sons	1997
July 18	Life... and Stuff	1997
July 22	Edgewise	1996
July 30	Pacific Palisades	1997
August 1	Eek! The Cat	1992
August 9	Nightmare Ned	1997
August 18	The Site	1996
August 22	Pappyland	1993
August 22	Spicy City	1997
August 29	The Disney Afternoon	1990
August 30	Hangin' with Mr. Cooper	1992
August 30	The Mask: Animated Series	1995
September 1	Kino's Storytime	1992
September 5	The Gordon Elliott Show	1994
September 6	Duckman	1994
September 7	Family Challenge	1995
September 20	X-Men (returned in 2024)	1992
September 26	Lamb Chop's Play-Along	1992
September 27	The Legend of Calamity Jane	1997
October 5	Remember This?	1996
October 12	The Big Easy	1996
October 24	Meego	1997
October 28	Head over Heels	1997
November 4	Over the Top	1997
November 11	Hitz	1997
November 16	Aaahh!!! Real Monsters	1994
November 19	Built to Last	1997
November 23	The Incredible Hulk	1996
November 24	Power Rangers Turbo	1997
November 25	Mummies Alive!	1997
November 28	The Grind	1992
November 28	Beavis and Butt-head (returned in 2011)	1993
December 4	Eagle Riders	1996
December 4	Extreme Ghostbusters	1997
December 6	Beakman's World	1992
December 6	The Magic School Bus	1994
December 10	The Tony Danza Show	1997
December 12	Where in Time Is Carmen Sandiego?	1996
December 15	Johnny Bravo (returned in 1999)	1997
December 17	Men Behaving Badly	1996
December 21	Weinerville	1993
December 24	Extreme Dinosaurs	1997
December 26	Shopping Spree	1996
December 27	Hee Haw	1969

=== Made-for-TV movies ===
Title	Network	Date of airing
Miss Evers' Boys	HBO	February 22
12 Angry Men	Showtime	August 17
Northern Lights	Disney Channel	August 23
Get to the Heart: The Barbara Mandrell Story	CBS	September 28
Under Wraps	Disney Channel	October 25
Don King: Only in America	HBO	November 15
What the Deaf Man Heard	CBS	November 23

=== Miniseries ===
Title	Network	Premiere
The Shining	ABC	April 27
Knots Landing: Back to the Cul-de-Sac	CBS	May 7/9
The Last Don	CBS	May 11
The Odyssey	NBC	May 18
Rough Riders	TNT	July 20
George Wallace	TNT	August 24

=== Shows changing networks ===
Show	Moved from	Moved to
JAG	NBC	CBS
Unsolved Mysteries	NBC	CBS
Family Matters	ABC	CBS
Step by Step	ABC	CBS
Muppets Tonight	ABC	Disney Channel
The Naked Truth	ABC	NBC
Clueless	ABC	UPN
Sweet Valley High	Syndication	UPN
Sliders	Fox	Sci-Fi Channel
Mystery Science Theater 3000	Comedy Central	Sci-Fi Channel
Politically Incorrect	Comedy Central	ABC
The Wonderful World of Disney	Disney Channel	ABC
Batman: The Animated Series	Fox Kids	Kids' WB
Dexter's Laboratory	TBS/Cartoon Network	Cartoon Network
Babylon 5	PTEN	TNT

=== Entering syndication this year ===
Show	Seasons	In Production	Source
Boy Meets World	4	Yes	
Due South	3	Yes	
Frasier	4	Yes	
Grace Under Fire	4	Yes	
Living Single	4	Yes	
NYPD Blue	4	Yes	
Walker, Texas Ranger	5	Yes	
The X-Files	4	Yes	

== Networks and services ==
=== Launches ===
Network	Type	Launch date	Notes	Source
Fox Sports West 2	Cable and satellite	January 27		
BET Movies: Starz! (3)	Cable and satellite	February 1		
CBS Eye on People	Cable and satellite	March 31	CBS Eye on People launches in 2 million homes with fourteen original programs supplied by CBS News, including live talk show Off 10th, 60 Minutes More, and 48 Hours Later. The channel received low carriage, and was later sold to Discovery Communications before being closed.	
Fox Sports Detroit	Cable and satellite	September 17	In 1997, News Corporation it would launch a Fox Sports network in Michigan, and won a surprise bid for local cable television rights to Detroit Pistons games. Fox Sports Detroit then acquired broadcast rights to Detroit Red Wings and Detroit Tigers games from competitor Pro-Am Sports System, and launched on September 17 for the NHL and MLB seasons.	
Comcast SportsNet Philadelphia	Cable television	October 1		
Fox Sports World	Cable and satellite	November 1		

=== Conversions and rebrandings ===
Old network name	New network name	Type	Conversion Date	Notes	Source
Encore+	Plex: Encore 1	Cable and satellite	January 1	Plex: Encore 1 replaced both Encore+, and Intro Television, which showed sampler blocks of different cable networks. Like Encore+, Plex aired programs from a different Encore multiplex channel each day. Plex rebranded as MoviePlex in October.	

=== Closures ===
Network	Type	End date	Notes	Sources
NewSport	Cable and satellite	July 9	NewSport, a 24-hour sports news channel owned by Rainbow Programming Holdings, had struggled to receive carriage throughout its run, receiving only 10 million subscribers at its peak. NewSport's slow growth compared to competitor ESPNews resulted in Rainbow closing NewSport on July 9.	
PRISM	Cable television	October 1		
SportsChannel Philadelphia	Cable and satellite	October 1		
Pro-Am Sports System	Cable and satellite	November 1	In 1997, Fox/Liberty Networks won an unexpected bid for the local cable television rights to Detroit Red Wings games from Pro-Am Sports System, then announced plans to launch a regional sports network to compete with PASS. Fox Sports Detroit won a bid for broadcast rights to the Detroit Pistons and Detroit Tigers contracts on August 26. On August 30, PASS owner Post-Newsweek sold its remaining Tigers and Pistons contracts and sportscaster John Keating's contract to Fox Sports Detroit before its launch, then shut down Pro-Am Sports System at midnight on November 1, 1997.	
Network One	Over-the-air multicast	November 13		

== Television stations ==
=== Station launches ===
Date	City of license/Market	Station	Channel	Affiliation
January 4	Eagle River/Rhinelander/Wausau, Wisconsin	WYOW	34	ABC
January 24	Vero Beach/West Palm Beach, Florida	W10CI	10	
January 27	Union City, Tennessee	W41CD	41	Independent
February 7	San Luis Obispo, California	KTAS	33	Univision
February 9	Orange Park/Jacksonville, Florida	WJXX	25	ABC
February 18	Laredo, Texas	K15EZ	15	TBN Enlace USA
March 2	Worthington, Minnesota	KSMN	15	PBS (part of Pioneer Public Television)
March 7	Fajardo, Puerto Rico	WRUA	34	Religious independent (satellite of WECN)
March 13	New York City	W22BM	22	The Box
March 17	Bryan, Texas	K12ON	12	Telemundo
March 18	Dallas/Fort Worth, Texas	KAZD	55	Independent
March 24	Snyder/Abilene, Texas	KPCB	17	God's Learning Channel
March 27	Ely, Nevada	KENV	10	NBC
April 14	Providence, Rhode Island (New Bedford, Massachusetts)	WLWC	28	UPN/The WB
May	Bozeman, Montana	KWYB-LP	28	ABC
May 3	Cedar Rapids, Iowa	KTVC	48	inTV
May 16	Christiansted, U.S. Virgin Islands	WATU	23	UPN
June 5	Paducah, Kentucky	WDKA	49	UPN
July 8	Everett/Seattle, Washington	KONG	16	Independent
July 17	Cheyenne, Wyoming	K26ES (translator of KLWY/Casper)	26	Fox
August	McAllen, Texas	K28FL	28	Spanish independent
August 13	Lewiston/Portland, Maine	WPME	35	UPN
August 31	Burlington, Vermont/Plattsburgh, New York	WFFF-TV	44	Fox
September 15	Columbia, South Carolina	WQHB	63	UPN/The WB
September 20	Gainesville, Florida	WGFL	28	The WB/UPN
September 20	Crossville/Knoxville, Tennessee	WBXX-TV	20	The WB
September 20	Gainesville, Florida	WGFL	53	The WB
October 24	Yuma, Arizona (El Centro, California)	KESE-LP	35	Telemundo
October 30	Pahrump, Nevada	K41CQ	41	Independent
November 21	Ellensburg, Washington	K39DM	39	Trinity Broadcasting Network
December 1	Little Rock, Arkansas	KVUT	42	inTV
December 1	Twentynine Palms, California	KVMD	31	America One
Unknown date	Del Rio, Texas	KTRG	28	Independent
Unknown date	Guayama, Puerto Rico	WIDP	46	Religious independent
Unknown date	Maryville/Milwaukee, Wisconsin	WWRS-TV	52	TBN
Unknown date	San Juan, Puerto Rico	WDZE	51	Independent
Unknown date	Twin Falls, Idaho	K45FK	14	Independent

=== Stations changing network affiliation ===
Market	Date	Station	Channel	Prior affiliation	New affiliation
Campbellsville, Kentucky	January 1	WGRB	34	FOX	The WB
Charleston, South Carolina	January 6	WMMP	36	The WB	UPN
Jacksonville, Florida	February 9	WJKS-TV	17	ABC	The WB
Seattle-Tacoma, Washington	June 30	KIRO-TV	7	UPN	CBS
Seattle-Tacoma, Washington	June 30	KSTW	11	CBS	UPN
Binghamton, New York	October 23	WBGH-CA	8	Independent	NBC

== Births ==
Date	Name	Notability
January 7	Kyle Stanger	English actor (Lumpy on My Friends Tigger & Pooh)
January 9	Lauryn McClain	Actress
January 11	Cody Simpson	Australian actor
January 17	Jake Paul	Boxer and actor (Bizaardvark)
January 17	Jazzy Williams	Actress (WITS Academy)
January 21	Jeremy Shada	Actor (Incredible Crew), Voice actor (Batman: The Brave and the Bold, Adventure Time)
January 24	Jonah Bobo	Voice actor (Austin on The Backyardigans)
January 24	Dylan Riley Snyder	Actor (Kickin' It)
February 7	Matthew Gumley	Voice actor (Benny on Dora the Explorer (2008–14))
February 9	Kathryn Newton	Actress (Gary Unmarried, Supernatural, Halt and Catch Fire)
February 10	Chloë Grace Moretz	Actress (My Friends Tigger & Pooh, Carrie, The 5th Wave)
February 12	Shane Baumel	Voice actor (Tipo on The Emperor's New School)
February 26	Aidan Gould	Actor
February 27	Erica Huang	Voice actress (June on Little Einsteins)
March 2	Becky G	Actress and singer
March 3	Camila Cabello	Singer
March 11	Matreya Fedor	Canadian actress (Mr. Young)
March 16	Tyrel Jackson Williams	Actor (The Backyardigans, Lab Rats)
March 18	Ciara Bravo	Actress (Big Time Rush, Red Band Society, Second Chance)
April 5	Dominik Mysterio	Pro wrestler
April 8	Evan Mock	Actor (Gossip Girl)
April 8	Sadie Calvano	Actress (Mom)
April 15	Maisie Williams	English actress (Game of Thrones)
April 16	Tiarnie Coupland	Australian actress (Worst Year of My Life Again)
April 24	Autumn Wendel	Actress (Every Witch Way)
May 9	Zane Huett	Actor (Desperate Housewives)
May 21	Kevin Quinn	Actor (Bunk'd)
May 30	Jake Short	Actor (A.N.T. Farm, Mighty Med, Lab Rats: Elite Force, All Night)
June 5	Denisea Wilson	Actress (Every Witch Way)
June 11	Sadie Robertson	Actress
June 16	Jack Perry	Pro wrestler and son of Luke Perry
June 17	KJ Apa	New-Zealand actor (Riverdale)
June 20	Maria Lark	Actress (Medium)
June 21	Rebecca Black	Singer
June 26	Jacob Elordi	Australian actor (Euphoria)
July 2	Jackson Odell	Actor that appeared in The Goldbergs, iCarly, and Modern Family (d. 2018)
July 4	Daniela Nieves	Venezuelan-American Actress (Every Witch Way, WITS Academy)
July 7	Gatlin Green	Actress (Heroes Reborn)
July 13	Leo Howard	Actor (Kickin' It, Shake It Up)
July 20	Billi Bruno	Actress (According to Jim)
July 22	Field Cate	Actor (Pushing Daisies)
August 2	Austin Theory	Pro wrestler
August 5	Olivia Holt	Actress (Kickin' It, I Didn't Do It, Cloak & Dagger)
August 5	Adam Irigoyen	Actor (Shake It Up)
August 10	Kylie Jenner	Actress (Keeping Up with the Kardashians)
August 11	Alexander Martella	Actor
August 16	Piper Curda	Actress (Randy Cunningham: 9th Grade Ninja, A.N.T. Farm, I Didn't Do It)
August 19	Marcello Hernández	Stand-up comedian (Saturday Night Live)
August 24	Karoline Leavitt	White House Press Secretary
August 25	Bryana Salaz	Actress (Best Friends Whenever) and singer
August 28	Emilia McCarthy	Canadian actress (Max & Shred)
September 7	Dean-Charles Chapman	English actor (Game of Thrones)
September 12	Sydney Sweeney	Actress (Everything Sucks!, Euphoria)
September 16	Elena Kampouris	Actress
October 6	Michael J. Woodard	Singer (American Idol, Majors & Minors) and voice actor (I Heart Arlo)
October 7	Kira Kosarin	Actress (The Thundermans)
October 8	Bella Thorne	Actress (Shake It Up, Famous in Love) and singer
October 10	Grace Rolek	Voice actress (Steven Universe, Steven Universe Future)
October 23	Zach Callison	Voice actor (Sofia the First, Steven Universe, Steven Universe Future)
October 24	Kendall Ryan Sanders	Actor (Every Witch Way)
October 24	Arthur Gunn	Singer (American Idol)
October 24	Bron Breakker	Pro wrestler
October 25	Tyler Alvarez	Actor (Every Witch Way)
October 26	Rhenzy Feliz	Actor (Runaways)
October 28	Sierra McCormick	Actress (A.N.T. Farm)
October 28	Joy-Anna Forsyth	Actress (19 Kids and Counting, Counting On) and television personality
October 29	Brynna Drummond	Canadian voice actress
October 31	Sydney Park	Actress (Instant Mom, Spirit Riding Free)
October 31	Holly Taylor	Actress
November 1	Alex Wolff	Actor (The Naked Brothers Band) and singer
November 1	Max Burkholder	Actor (My Friends Tigger & Pooh, Parenthood)
November 3	Carson Rowland	Actor (I Am Frankie)
November 6	Jamal Roberts	Singer, American Idol season 23 winner
November 8	Christina Robinson	Actor (Dexter)
November 12	Ryan Cargill	Actor (WITS Academy)
November 14	George Sear	English actor (Love, Victor)
November 26	Aubrey Joseph	Actor (Cloak & Dagger) and rapper
November 26	Luka Sabbat	Actor and model (Grown-ish)
December 5	Maddie Poppe	Singer, American Idol season 16 Winner
December 11	Taylor Hickson	Actress (Motherland: Fort Salem)
December 15	Maude Apatow	Actress (Euphoria)

== Deaths ==
Date	Name	Age	Notability
January 18	Adriana Caselotti	80	Voice actress (Snow White)
February 6	Ernie Anderson	73	Voice actor and announcer (The Carol Burnett Show)
February 26	David Doyle	67	Actor (Bosley on Charlie's Angels and voice of Grandpa Lou Pickles on Rugrats)
March 15	Gail Davis	71	Actress (Annie on Annie Oakley)
April 15	Don Bexley	87	Actor (Bubba on Sanford and Son)
May 4	Alvy Moore	75	Actor (Hank Kimball on Green Acres)
May 11	Howard Morton	71	Character actor (Officer Ralph Simpson on Gimme a Break!)
May 18	Bridgette Andersen	21	Actress
May 24	Edward Mulhare	74	Actor (Captain Gregg on The Ghost & Mrs. Muir and Miles on Knight Rider)
June 8	Reid Shelton	72	Actor (1st & Ten: The Championship)
June 14	Richard Jaeckel	70	Actor (Baywatch, Spenser for Hire)
June 24	Brian Keith	75	Actor (Uncle Bill on Family Affair)
July 1	Robert Mitchum	79	Actor
July 2	James Stewart	89	Actor
July 4	Charles Kuralt	62	Journalist (CBS News Sunday Morning)
August 27	Brandon Tartikoff	48	President of NBC
August 31	Princess Diana	36	Princess of Wales
September 9	Burgess Meredith	89	Actor (The Penguin on Batman)
September 17	Red Skelton	84	Comedian (The Red Skelton Show)
October 5	Brian Pillman	35	Professional wrestler
October 9	Arch Johnson	75	Character actor (Camp Runamuck)
October 16	Audra Lindley	79	Actress (Mrs. Roper on Three's Company)
October 24	Don Messick	71	Voice actor (Scooby-Doo)
October 30	Sydney Newman	80	Producer (The Avengers, Doctor Who)
November 25	Charles Hallahan	54	Actor (Hunter)
December 18	Chris Farley	33	Comedian (Saturday Night Live)
December 24	Toshiro Mifune	77	Japanese actor
December 25	Denver Pyle	77	Actor (Uncle Jesse on The Dukes of Hazzard)
December 31	Michael LeMoyne Kennedy	39	American socialite and son of Robert F. Kennedy

== Television debuts ==
- James Gandolfini – Gun
- Natasha Henstridge – The Outer Limits
- Nick Offerman – ER
- Rebecca Romijn – Friends
- Octavia Spencer – 413 Hope St.
- Jason Sudeikis – Alien Avengers II
- Wanda Sykes – The Chris Rock Show
- Paz Vega – Menudo es mi padre
- Goran Visnjic – Olujne tisine 1895-1995
- Shea Whigham – Ghost Stories
- Rainn Wilson – One Life to Live
