= Deering Building =

- U.S. National Register of Historic Places
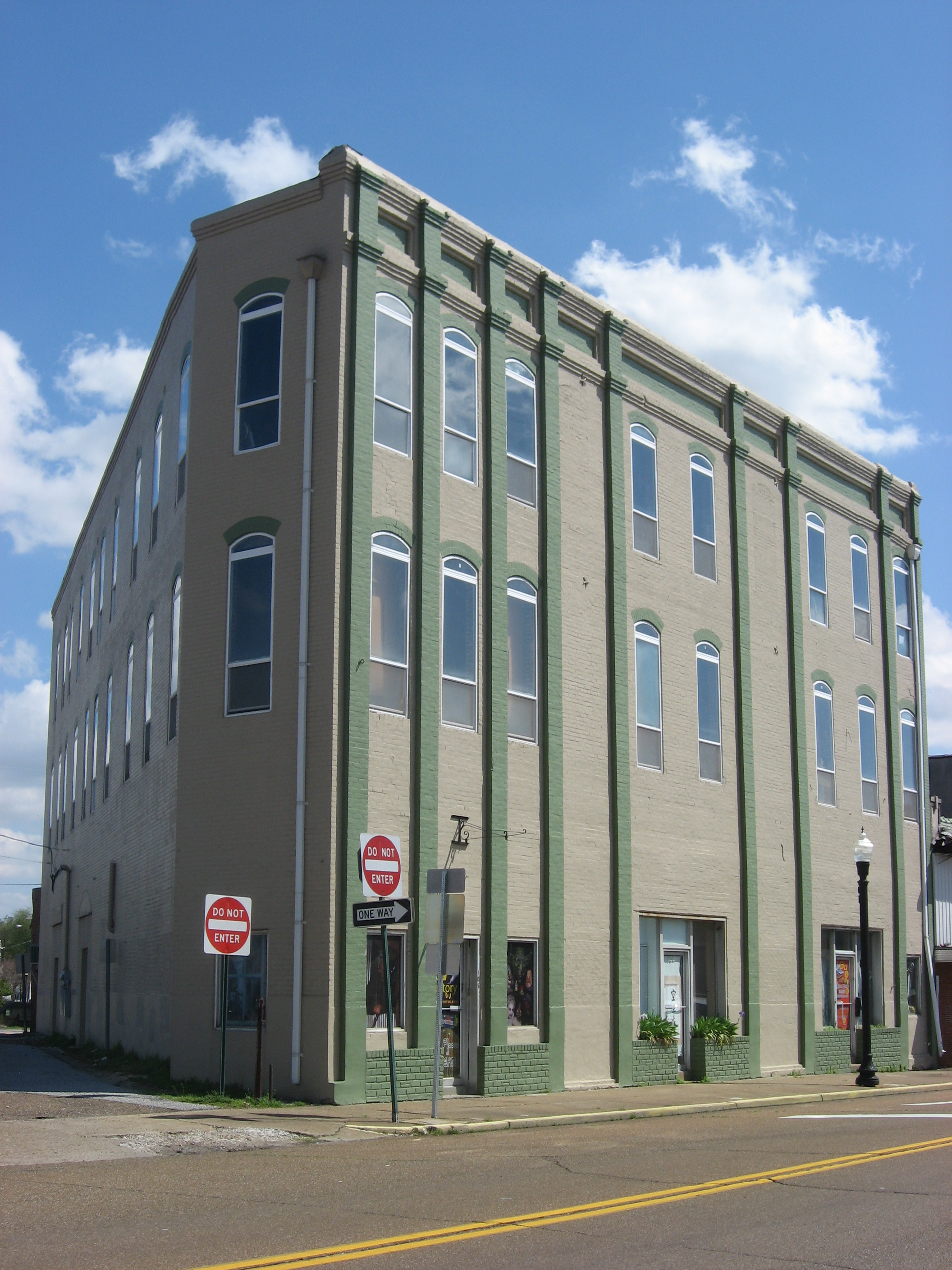
- The Deering Building in 2013

- Location within Tennessee
- Location: 106 1st Street, Union City, Tennessee
- Coordinates: 36°25′32″N 89°03′24″W
- Area: less than one acre
- Built: 1891
- Architectural style: Late Victorian
- NRHP reference No.: 83004283
- Added to NRHP: November 25, 1983

The Deering Building is a historic three-story building in Union City, Tennessee. It was built in 1891 for the Deering Harvester Company. In 1905, its general manager, R.F. Tisdale, purchased the building and it became the headquarters of Tisdale's Grain, Field Seeds, and Implements, "the largest dealer of farming supplies in West Tennessee." By the 1940s, tobacco wholesalers W.P. Alexander, Sr. and C.E. Jones used the building for their enterprise. By the 1980s, it was used by several businesses.

The building was designed in the Victorian architectural style. It has been listed on the National Register of Historic Places since November 25, 1983.
