= Jack McElroy =

Jack McElroy may refer to:

- Jack McElroy, editor of Knoxville News Sentinel
- Jack McElroy (footballer) (1913–1958), Australian rules footballer
- Jack McElroy, a character in Sarah Jane Smith: Ghost Town

== See also ==
- John McElroy (disambiguation)
