= John McElroy =

John McElroy may refer to:

- John McElroy (author) (1846–1929), American printer, newspaper publisher, soldier, journalist and author
- John McElroy (Canada), Royal Canadian Air Force pilot, veteran of World War II, Mahal (Israel) in the 1948 Arab–Israeli War
- John McElroy (Jesuit) (1782–1877), Jesuit priest
- John McElroy (producer), audiobook producer, see 1998 Grammy Awards
- John McElroy (blogger), Autoline Detroit blogger

== See also ==
- Jack McElroy (disambiguation)
