= Thomas Leroy Bransford House =

- U.S. National Register of Historic Places
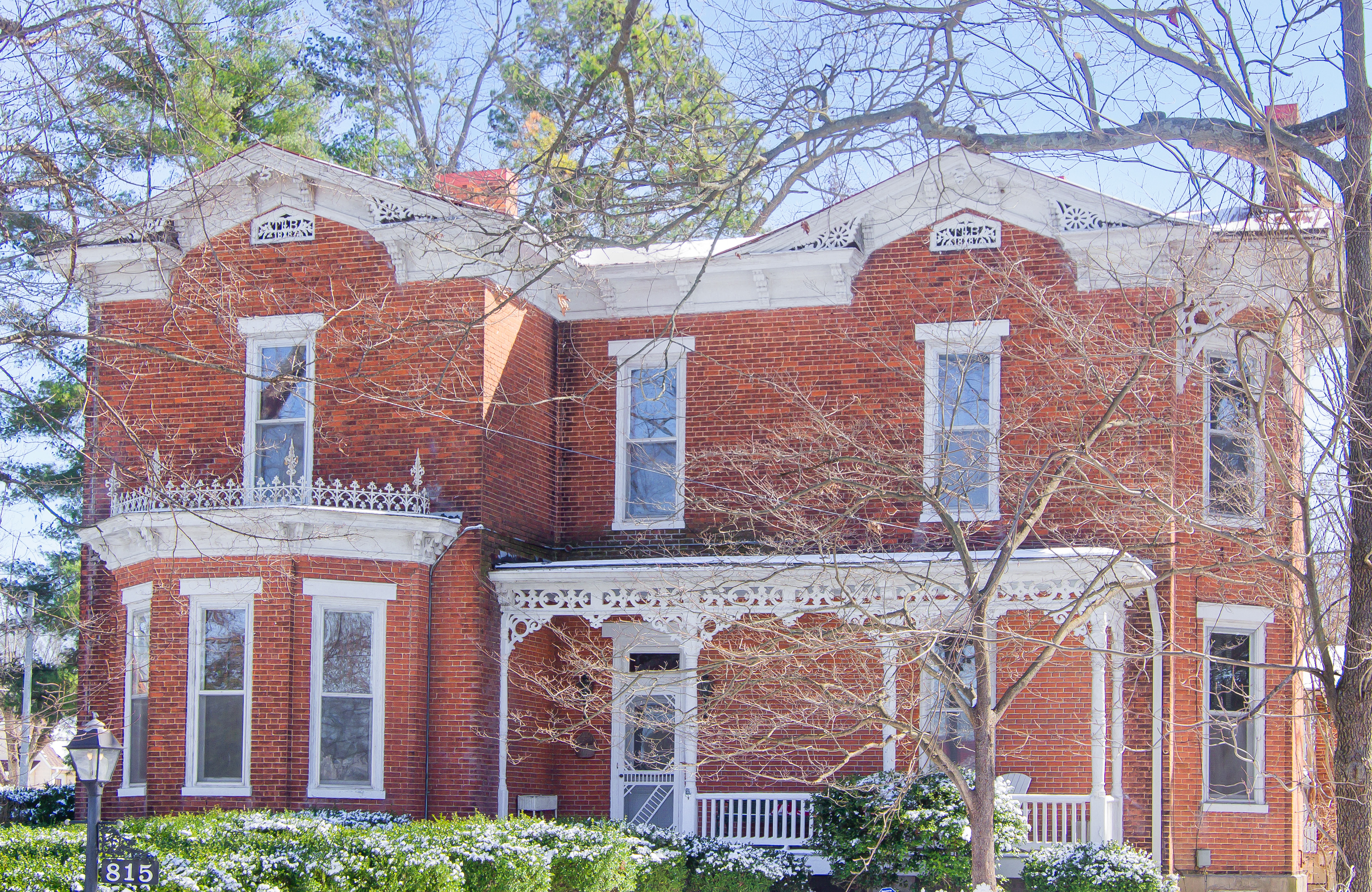

- Location within Tennessee
- Location: 815 North Ury Street, Union City, Tennessee
- Coordinates: 36°25′53″N 89°02′57″W
- Area: Less than 1 acre (0.40 ha)
- Built: 1887
- Architectural style: Folk Victorian, Queen Anne
- NRHP reference No.: 95000977
- Added to NRHP: August 4, 1995

The Thomas Leroy Bransford House is a historic two-story house in Union City, Tennessee. It was built in 1887 for Thomas Leroy Bransford, his wife née Emma Catron, and their ten children. Bransford was a Confederate veteran and the owner of T. L. Bransford and Sons, a contractor of red bricks and concrete. He was also the president of the Farmers and Merchants Bank, a director of the Commercial Bank and the Third National Bank, and he served on Union City's board of alderman.

The house was designed in the Folk Victorian and Queen Anne architectural styles. It has been listed on the National Register of Historic Places since August 4, 1995.
