= Rives Volunteer Fire Department =

Rives Fire Department

Coordinates: 36°21′21″N 89°02′48″W

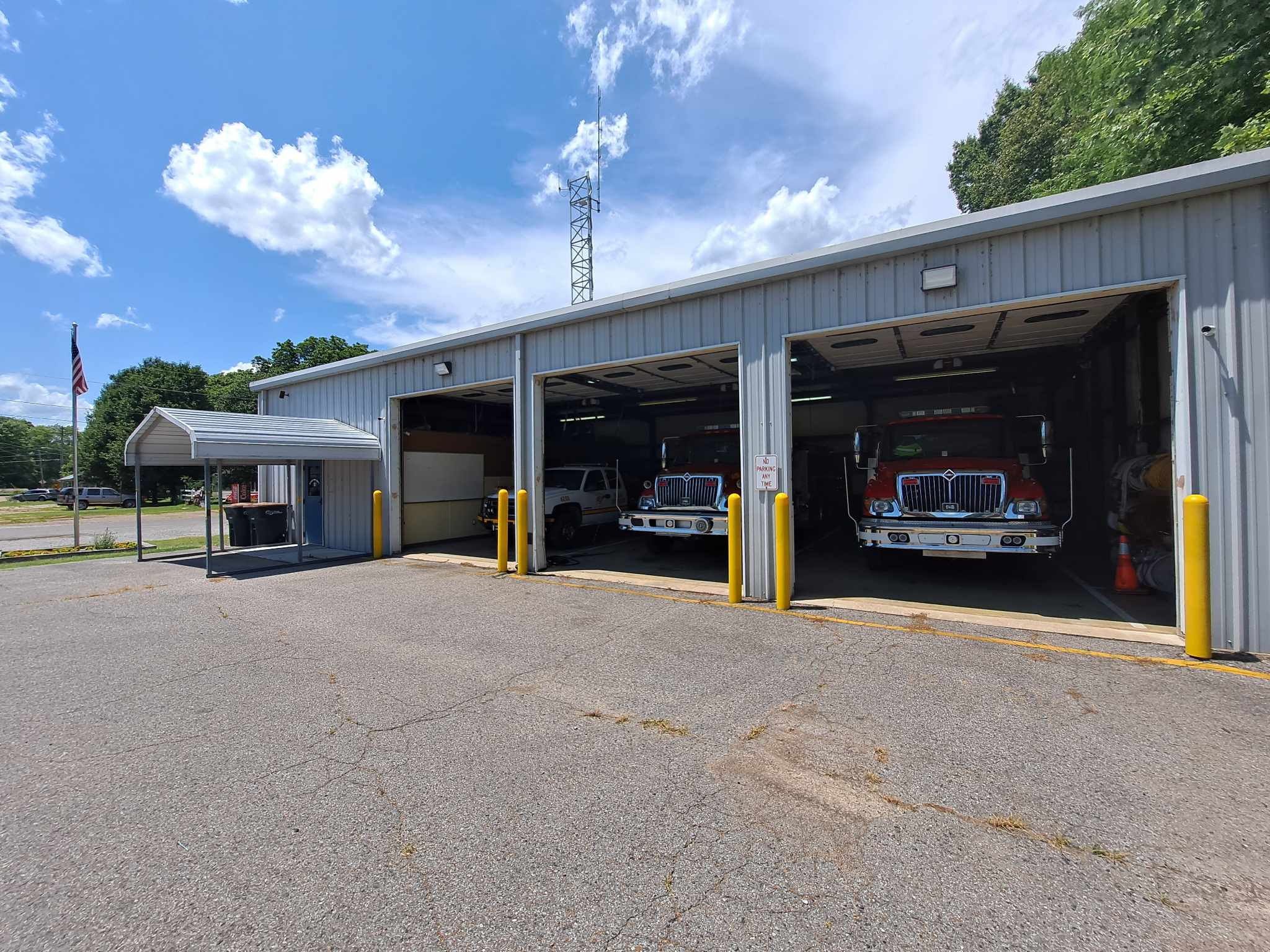

Operational area
- Country: United States
- State: Tennessee
- U.S. County: Obion County
- City: Rives
- Address: 3456 East Cross Street, Rives, TN 38253

Agency overview
- Established: 1980
- Annual calls: 210 (2026)
- Employees: 21
- Staffing: Full Time / Volunteer
- Fire chief: Campbell Rice
- Motto: "The Desire to Serve, the Courage to Act, the Ability to Perform."

Facilities and equipment
- Stations: 1
- Engines: 1
- Squads: 1
- Tenders: 1
- USAR: 1
- Airport crash: 1
- Wildland: 1
- Fireboats: 2

The Rives Volunteer Fire Department is the agency that provides fire protection in the city of Rives, Tennessee, as well as the surrounding Fire District 61 in Obion County. The department is also responsible for the handling of hazardous materials. As well as water rescue.They have an annual budget of $27,000.

Rives Firefighters are assigned numerics beginning in "61", after their district. Probationary Firefighters have a 20-series number after "61", regular Firefighters have a 10-series, and Officers have a single digit.

== Station ==
The Fire Station a 3 bay with another 3 bays in the back is located at 3466 East Cross Street in Rives, and was constructed in 1996, and 2025. The original station was at a nearby re-purposed gas station, which no longer stands. The building possesses an 80-foot radio tower.

== Apparatus ==
Their first apparatus was a 300-gallon 1943 fire engine. They possess a Brush Truck, numbered 6181 (2024 International CV 5500 Heavy Duty), a Fire Engine, (2006 International 7400 SBA 4X2) 6151, and a Tanker (2005 International 7400 6X4), 6171,6182 a Polaris Side by Side, Boat 1 & 2, in accordance with the Obion County apparatus numbering system.
