= Houser House =

- U.S. National Register of Historic Places
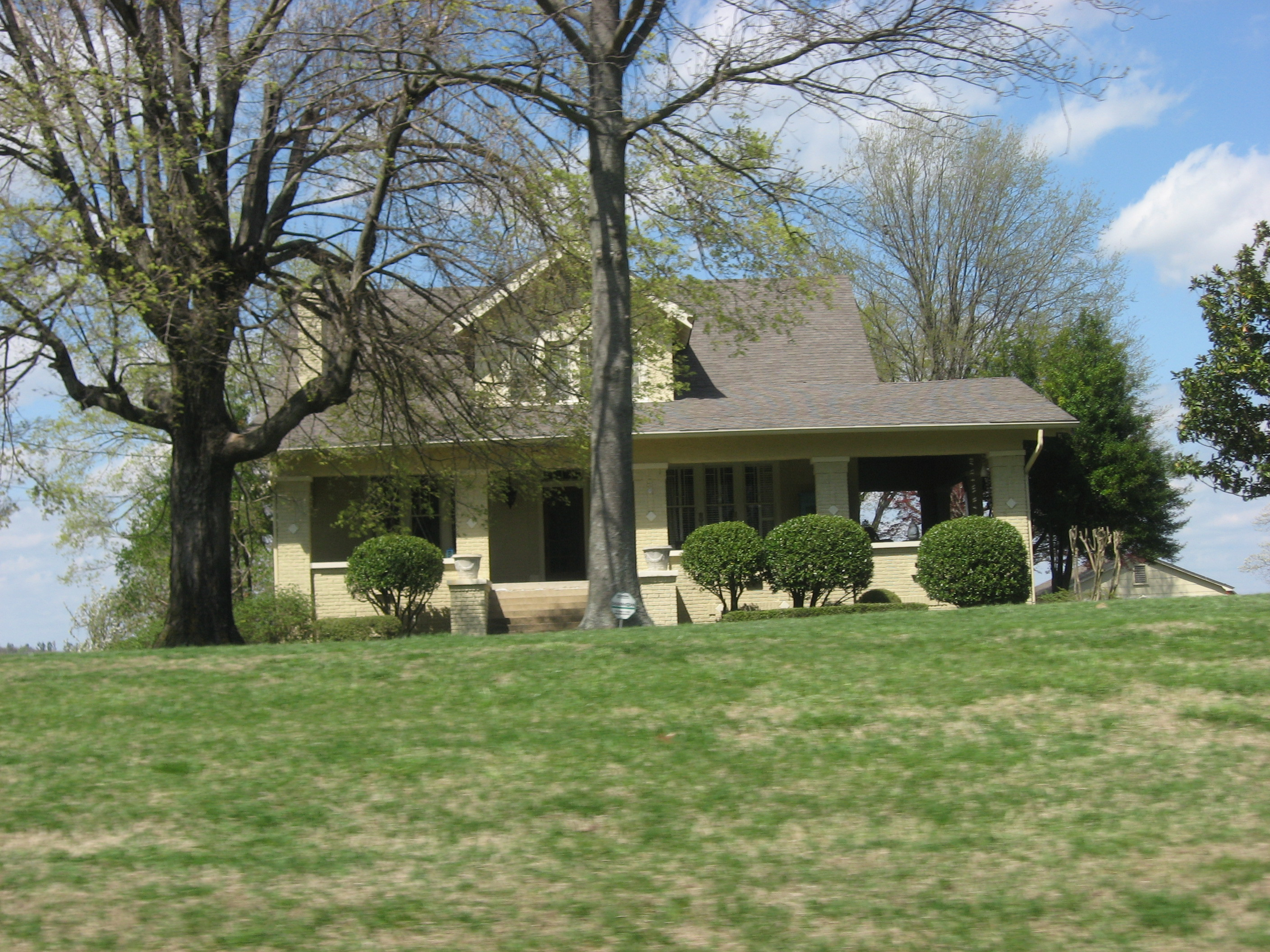
- The Houser House in 2013

- Location within Tennessee
- Nearest city: Union City, Tennessee
- Coordinates: 36°25′42″N 89°04′17″W
- Area: 5.8 acres (2.3 ha)
- Built: 1928
- Architectural style: Bungalow/craftsman
- NRHP reference No.: 02000809
- Added to NRHP: July 17, 2002

The Houser House is a historic two-story house in Union City, Tennessee. It was built in 1928 for O. E. Gorton and his wife, Nell Houser. The Gortons raised hogs and cattle on their farm. The Housers were settlers in Obion County; the first member of the family was Anthony Houser, who received a land grant in 1841. The house was sold out of the Houser family in 1989.

The house was designed in the American Craftsman architectural style. It has been listed on the National Register of Historic Places since July 17, 2002.
