= Mt. Zion Christian Methodist Episcopal Church =

Historic church in Tennessee, United States

- Mt. Zion Colored Methodist Episcopal Church
- U.S. National Register of Historic Places
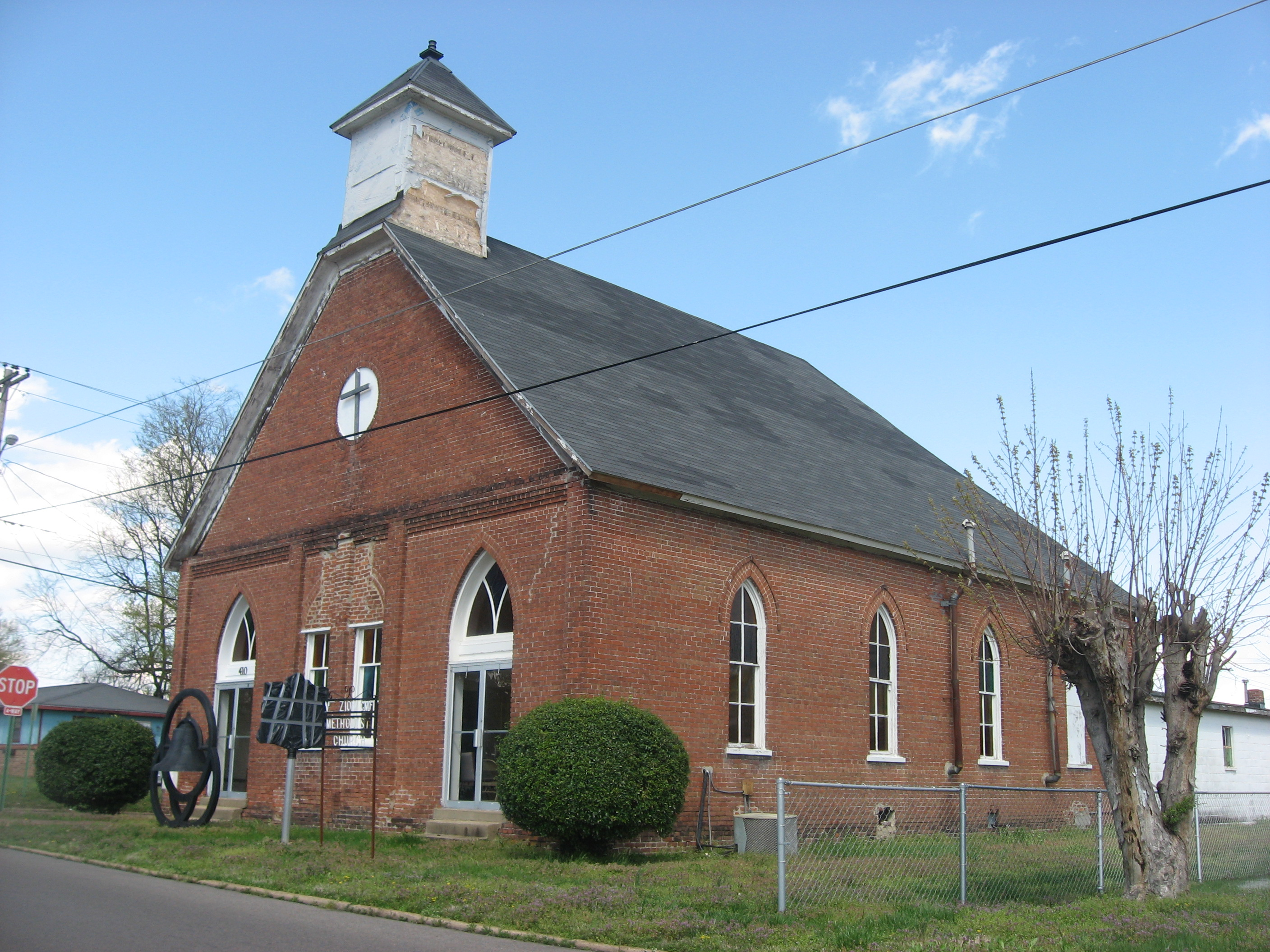
- Front and southern side

- Location within Tennessee Location within the United States
- Location: Corner of North Greenwood and East College Streets, Union City, Tennessee
- Coordinates: 36°25′41″N 89°2′40″W
- Area: 1 acre (0.40 ha)
- Built: 1896
- Architectural style: Gothic Revival
- MPS: Union City, Tennessee MPS
- NRHP reference No.: 01000140
- Added to NRHP: February 16, 2001

Mt. Zion Christian Methodist Episcopal Church, formerly Mt. Zion Colored Methodist Episcopal Church, is a historic African-American church in Union City, Tennessee, at the corner of North Greenwood and East College Streets.

The Mt. Zion congregation was organized in 1870, the same year that the Colored Methodist Episcopal Church was formed as a new denomination by African Americans who had been members of the Methodist Episcopal Church, South. In its early years, the congregation worshiped in a frame church in Union City's African-American neighborhood. By the 1890s, the growth of the congregation and the increasing prosperity of its members led it to start a larger brick church building. The new church was constructed by church members and dedicated in 1896. Its architecture is a vernacular interpretation of the Gothic Revival style popular in the late 19th century.

The original 1896 brick building houses the church sanctuary. It is a symmetrical basilica design with gable ends and a bell tower. A notable feature of the interior is its unusual hipped ceiling. The ceiling, which is elevated about 30 feet (9.1 m) above the floor, has three sections formed of narrow wooden planks suspended from the rafters. The center section of planks is parallel to the floor. The side sections angle down to the brick walls. Overhead lighting in the sanctuary comes from four Victorian-era branched metal fixtures, originally made for gas lighting and converted to electricity around 1920, that hang from the hipped ceiling. Each fixture has sixteen bulbs; their light is directed by a large open circular shade mounted above the bulbs. As of 1996, the church still had its original pews. Panels on the ends of the pews are embellished with Gothic arches, echoing the shape of the windows.

In 1917, the Mt. Zion church sponsored the building of a new schoolhouse for African-American children. The new brick schoolhouse, named Miles School, was built on North Greenwood Street directly across from the church. Together, the church and the school functioned as important centers for the local African-American community. The original Miles School building was replaced by a newer building in the 1950s or 1960s, but the location continued to be the site of Union City's segregated black school. The location continues to be used for education; as of 2014 it is the site of the Miles Early Head Start center.

A community and classroom building was added onto the rear of the church building around 1940. In 1956, when its denomination changed its name from "Colored Methodist Episcopal" to "Christian Methodist Episcopal", the Mt. Zion church adopted its current name. The congregation disorganized in 2005, but it was restarted in 2007 under the pastoral leadership of Darrell Turner, who had grown up in the church.

When the church was added to the National Register of Historic Places in 2001, it was described as Union City's "oldest remaining architectural artifact of African-American craftsmanship of the late Victorian era."
