= Confederate Monument (Union City, Tennessee) =

- U.S. National Register of Historic Places
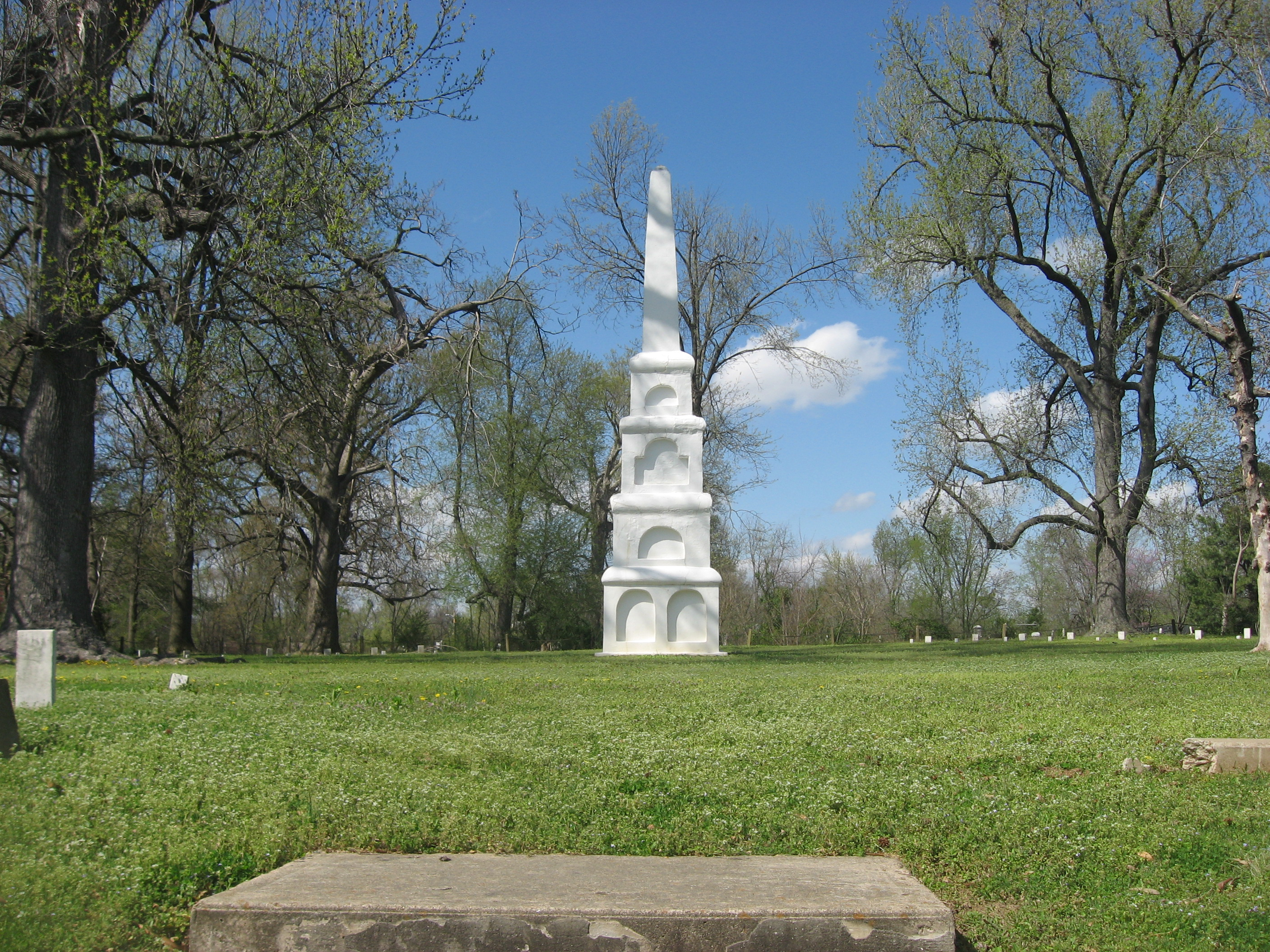
- Street view of the monument

- Location within Tennessee Location within the United States
- Location: Summer and Edwards Sts., Union City, Tennessee
- Coordinates: 36°25′13″N 89°2′50″W
- Area: 0.5 acres (0.20 ha)
- Built: 1869
- NRHP reference No.: 77001286
- Added to NRHP: July 28, 1977

The Confederate Monument in Union City, Tennessee, also known as First Monument to Unknown Confederate Dead, is a simple marker erected in 1869 in a cemetery that was the burial site for the remains of 29 unidentified Confederate combatants killed in the American Civil War. It is about 40 feet (12 m) tall. Dedicated on October 21, 1869, it was one of Tennessee's first Confederate monuments. It was listed on the National Register of Historic Places in 1977. It is asserted to be the first monument to honor unknown Confederate dead.

== History ==
The Confederate Monument was erected in 1869 in a cemetery already dedicated to unknown Confederate soldiers. Two more were added later, a Confederate doctor from Kentucky who died after the war and a Charles Shepperd, a black manservant of General George Maney, whom had requested to be buried there and has the only named grave. The monument originally had a Bible, a rifle and a booklet about the history of the monument stored within the base however vandals broke in and stole them. They also broke through the dedication plaque, which resulted in the United Daughters of the Confederacy convincing the Obion County Court to contribute $100 for repair, though the repaired plaque forgot to include the date of erection.

During the American Civil War Centennial, nationwide research from various state bodies and roundtable groups could not determine an older monument to the unknown Confederate dead, thus the monument became known as the "First Monument to Unknown Confederate Dead". Ownership of the monument is also unknown as to whether it is public or private land held in trust as no one has been able to show legal title to it. Despite this, the Union City authorities maintain the cemetery and monument.

Union City also has a Confederate monument erected in 1909 with a dedication that reads:

To The Confederate Soldier of Obion County
Who Was Killed In Battle
Who Was Starved In Federal Prison
And Who Has Preserved Anglo-Saxon Civilization In The South
