= WWCI-CD =

Television station in Orlando, Florida

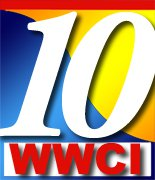
- Orlando, Florida (Note: Originally licensed to Vero Beach, Florida; moved to Orlando in 2026.); United States
- Channels: Digital: 12 (VHF); Virtual: 10
- Branding: WWCI-TV 10

Programming
- Affiliations: see § Subchannels

Ownership
- Owner: Innovate Corp.; (HC2 Station Group, Inc.)

History
- Founded: March 1996
- Former call signs: W10CI (1996); WWCI-LP (1996–2001); WWCI-CA (2001–2013)
- Former channel numbers: Analog: 10 (VHF, 1996–2013); Digital: 10 (VHF, 2013–2026)
- Call sign meaning: From the translator call sign

Technical information
- Licensing authority: FCC
- Facility ID: 18894
- Class: CD
- ERP: 1 kW
- HAAT: 23.1 m (76 ft)
- Transmitter coordinates: 28°32′42″N 81°22′47″W

Links
- Public license information: Public file; LMS

WWCI-CD (channel 10) is a low-power, Class A television station in Orlando, Florida, United States. Owned by Innovate Corp., the station broadcasts from a transmitter on North Orange Avenue in downtown Orlando.

== History ==
The station's construction permit was issued on November 20, 1992, under the call sign of W10CI. originally licensed to Vero Beach. The station then began broadcasting in March 1996, primarily relying on National Empowerment Television (NET) as its program source. Renamed WWCI-LP later that year, the station was added to local cable systems six months after starting and began producing local news and talk programming for Indian River and St. Lucie counties. This was supplemented with news from Bloomberg Television, America's Voice (the former NET), and All News Channel.

V One Broadcasting sold WWCI-CD to HC2 in 2018.

In spring 2026, WWCI-CD moved to Orlando.

== Subchannels ==
Subchannels of WWCI-CD
Subchannel	Res.	Short name	Programming
10.1	480i	WWCI-CD	Infomercials (4:3)
10.2	480i	WWCI-CD	Infomercials (4:3)
10.3	480i	WWCI-CD	Defy
10.4	480i	WWCI-CD	Salem News Channel
10.5	480i	WWCI-CD	365BLK
10.6	480i	WWCI-CD	Infomercials
10.7	480i	WWCI-CD	Fubo Sports Network
