= WUWT-CD =

Union City, Tennessee; United States
- City: Union City, Tennessee
- Channels: Digital: 24 (UHF); Virtual: 26
- Branding: WUWT TV 26

Programming
- Subchannels: 26.1: Retro TV; 26.2: The Family Channel

Ownership
- Owner: Harpole Telecom, Inc.

History
- First air date: January 28, 1997
- Former call signs: W41CD (1997-1998); W26BU (1998-2001); WUWT-CA (2001-2012)
- Former channel numbers: Analog: 41 (UHF, 1997-1998); 26 (UHF, 1998-2012); Digital: 26 (UHF, 2012-2020)
- Former affiliations: Analog/DT1: Independent (1997-2001); America One (2001-2015); DT2: The Family Channel (2014-2019)
- Call sign meaning: We're Upper West Tennessee

Technical information
- Licensing authority: FCC
- Facility ID: 32216
- ERP: 15 kW
- HAAT: 303 ft (92 m)
- Transmitter coordinates: 36°26′46.2″N 89°2′12.2″W

Links
- Public license information: Public file; LMS
- Website: WUWT Website

WUWT-CD, virtual channel 26 and UHF digital channel 24, is a low-power, Class A Retro TV-affiliated television station licensed to Union City, Tennessee, United States. The station is owned by Harpole Telecom. Its transmitter and studio facility are located on the north side of Union City at 3862 Bartham Road off of US 51 bypass. On cable, the station is available through Charter Cable channel 8 and Time Warner cable channel 10.

== History ==
The history of WUWT traces back to July 1, 1991, when W09BM signed on the air in Union City as an independent station, and the 31st licensed low-powered television station to sign-on in the state of Tennessee.

A new station serving as a translator for W09BM signed on the air on January 28, 1997, as W41CD. It started as an independent station for the first four years. The station then changed its calls to W26BU when it moved to UHF channel 26 in 1998. Beginning in 2001, the station's call letters were changed to WUWT-CA, and became an America One affiliate, and stayed with that network for the better part of the station's existence.

In late summer of 2014, the Harpole family decided to continue the work of their father who had envisioned a "Community TV station" serving Union City, Martin, and the communities of the Ken-Tenn area. The company recruited a new manager and program coordinator with an expertise in building television brands. The single channel was quickly rebranded and a new emphasis on quality local programming, local news, and a strong network affiliation was launched.

In late fall of 2014, the company chose Luken Communications as its national network provider. Just before Yootoo TV's acquisition of America One's programming, in 2015, the station became an affiliate of the Retro Television Network (RTV). Upgrading the general entertainment value was a primary focus of the new management team. The association and business relationship with Luken Communications was one of several strategic moves the company conducted in an effort to create a digital television distribution platform.

While operating a single, analog channel was the initial vision of the founder, a new vision and business plan has evolved. The digital conversation and subsequent "reallocation" of frequencies and recent advances in technology have applied an entirely new economics to the once struggling class of broadcaster known as an LPTV or low power television station. WUWT's second subchannel launched in 2014 to carry The Family Channel. However, in late January 2019, the DT2 subchannel switched to Heartland.

== Coverage area ==
With its 15 kilowatts of effective radiated power, and their tower height at 303 feet, the station can be picked up with an antenna in the southernmost part of the Jackson Purchase region of western Kentucky, about five counties in northwest Tennessee, and parts of the New Madrid vicinity of southeastern Missouri. The 26.1 channel serves nearly 70,000 homes in over 14 counties reaching a population of nearly 170,000 when combined with its current cable distribution and over the air broadcast.
