= Dickey's Octagonal Barbershop =

- Formerly listed on the U.S. National Register of Historic Places
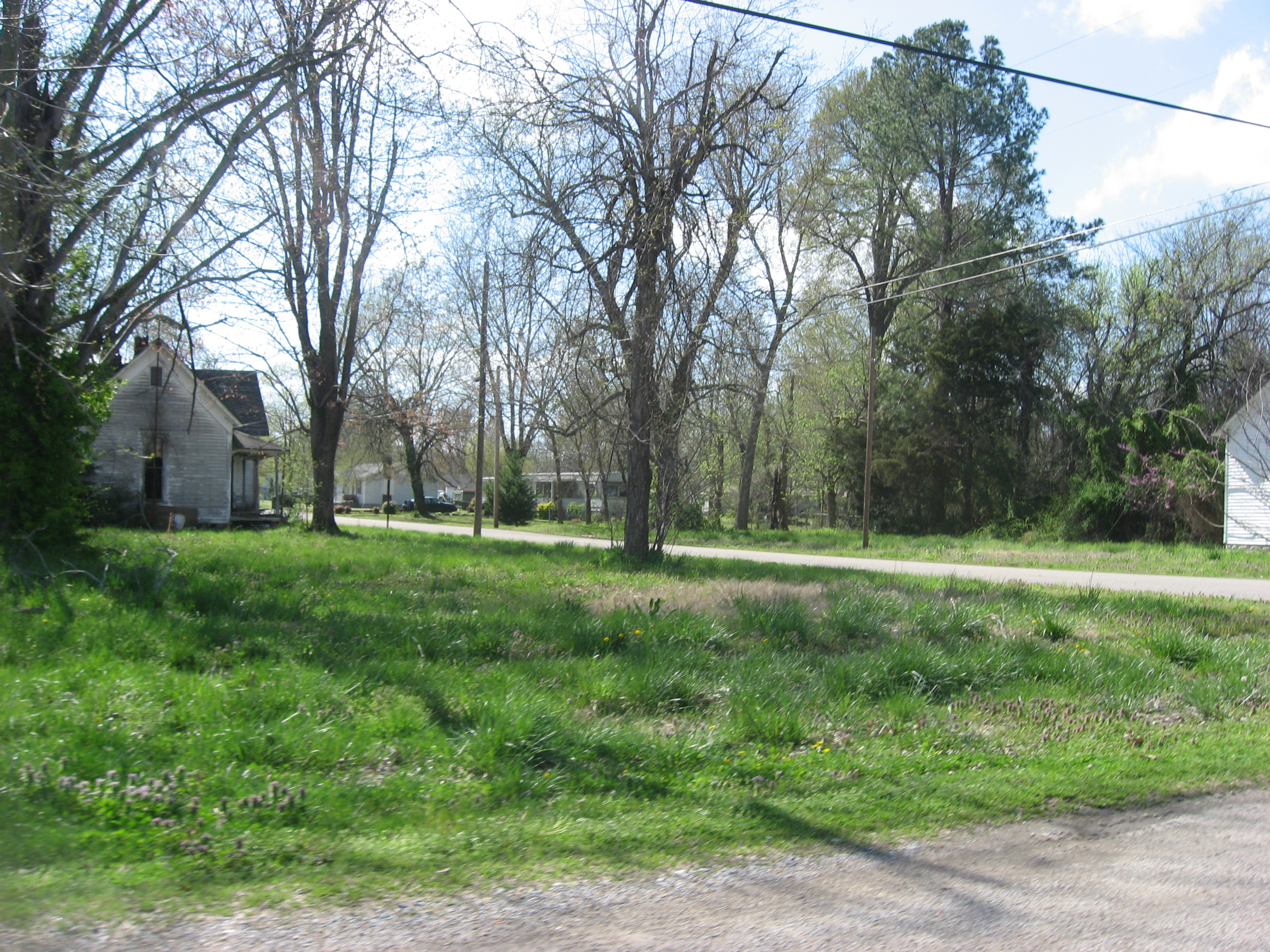
- Site of the barbershop

- Location within Tennessee Location within the United States
- Location: SW corner High and N. Church Sts., Rives, Tennessee
- Coordinates: 36°21′34″N 89°2′57″W
- Built: 1894
- Architect: Charlie Conn
- Architectural style: Octagon mode
- NRHP reference No.: 75001772

Significant dates
- Added to NRHP: April 29, 1975
- Removed from NRHP: November 27, 2019

Dickey's Octagonal Barbershop, built in 1894, was a historic octagon-shaped barber shop building located on the southwest corner of High and North Church streets, in Rives, Tennessee. It was vacant on April 29, 1975, when it was added to the National Register of Historic Places. It was delisted in 2019.
