= Rives, Tennessee =

- Town
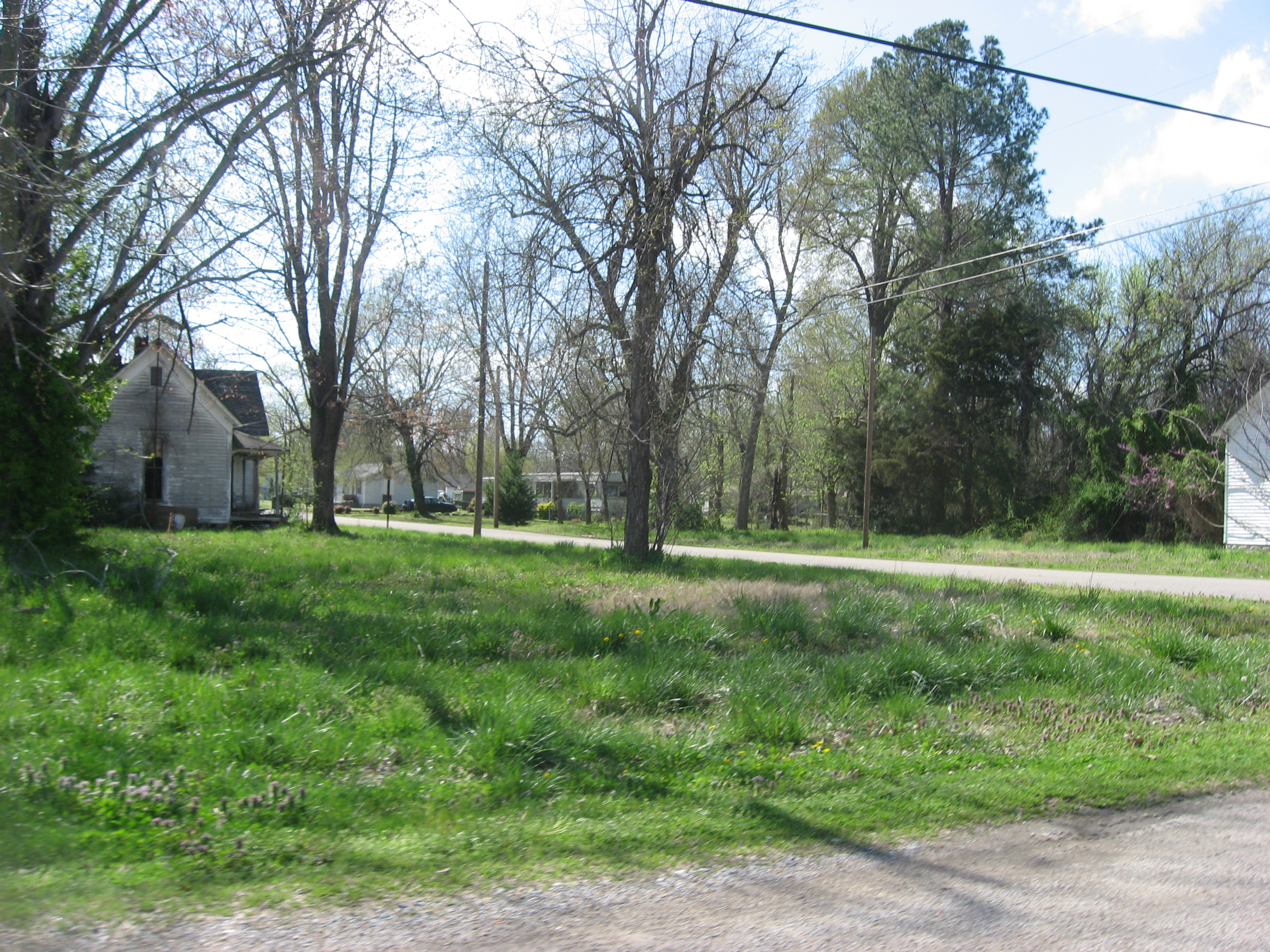
- Streetside at the site of Dickey's Octagonal Barbershop

- Location of Rives in Obion County, Tennessee.
- Coordinates: 36°21′26″N 89°2′59″W
- Country: United States
- State: Tennessee
- County: Obion

Government
  - Mayor: Lester Burnes

Area
  - Total: 0.34 sq mi (0.89 km^{2})
  - Land: 0.34 sq mi (0.89 km^{2})
  - Water: 0 sq mi (0.00 km^{2})
- Elevation: 299 ft (91 m)

Population (2020)
  - Total: 246
  - Density: 712.5/sq mi (275.11/km^{2})
- Time zone: UTC-6 (Central (CST))
  - Summer (DST): UTC-5 (CDT)
- ZIP code: 38253
- Area code: 731
- FIPS code: 47-63800
- GNIS feature ID: 1299539

Rives is a town in Obion County, Tennessee. The population was 312 at the 2020 census. It is part of the Union City, TN–KY Micropolitan Statistical Area.

Located just south of Union City, Rives was originally known as Troy Station. Settlers from South Carolina first came to the area in the 1820s and by the 1850s, the town was flourishing because of the Mobile and Ohio Railroad. Rives has a rich railroad history and at one time the town had several hotels to serve the passenger trains that traveled the area.

== Fire department and law enforcement ==
Rives maintains Rives Volunteer Fire Department, which was established in 1980. The current Chief is David Kendall, the last remaining original member. The Department has a station with three apparatus across from the post office. RVFD is responsible for Fire District 61 in the County, responding to 83 emergency calls for service in 2022, 102 calls in 2021, 65 calls in 2020, and 186 calls in 2019. The Department has mutual aid agreements with the Fire Departments in Union City, and South Fulton.

Law enforcement in the city is the responsibility of the Obion County Sheriff's Office, and the Tennessee Highway Patrol.

== Geography ==
Rives is located at 36°21′26″N 89°2′59″W (36.357124, -89.049744).

According to the United States Census Bureau, the town has a total area of 0.3 square miles (0.78 km^{2}), all land.

Tennessee State Route 216 passes straight through the center of Rives.

== Demographics ==
Historical population
| Census | Pop. | Note | %± |
|---|---|---|---|
| 1880 | 180 | | — |
| 1890 | 377 | | 109.4% |
| 1910 | 468 | | — |
| 1920 | 495 | | 5.8% |
| 1930 | 417 | | −15.8% |
| 1940 | 481 | | 15.3% |
| 1950 | 413 | | −14.1% |
| 1960 | 291 | | −29.5% |
| 1970 | 385 | | 32.3% |
| 1980 | 386 | | 0.3% |
| 1990 | 344 | | −10.9% |
| 2000 | 331 | | −3.8% |
| 2010 | 326 | | −1.5% |
| 2020 | 246 | | −24.5% |

As of the census of 2000, there were 331 people, 127 households, and 94 families residing in the town. The population density was 942.8 inhabitants per square mile (364.0/km^{2}). There were 150 housing units at an average density of 427.3 per square mile (165.0/km^{2}). The racial makeup of the town was 93.96% White, 5.74% African American, and 0.30% from two or more races. Hispanic or Latino of any race were 0.91% of the population.

There were 127 households, out of which 34.6% had children under the age of 18 living with them, 56.7% were married couples living together, 12.6% had a female householder with no husband present, and 25.2% were non-families. 22.8% of all households were made up of individuals, and 10.2% had someone living alone who was 65 years of age or older. The average household size was 2.61 and the average family size was 3.03.

In the town, the population was spread out, with 26.9% under the age of 18, 8.5% from 18 to 24, 29.6% from 25 to 44, 20.2% from 45 to 64, and 14.8% who were 65 years of age or older. The median age was 36 years. For every 100 females, there were 91.3 males. For every 100 females age 18 and over, there were 92.1 males.

The median income for a household in the town was $26,964, and the median income for a family was $30,313. Males had a median income of $31,500 versus $12,917 for females. The per capita income for the town was $11,072. About 20.6% of families and 20.9% of the population were below the poverty line, including 22.1% of those under age 18 and 27.3% of those age 65 or over.

== Education ==
It is in the Obion County Schools.
