= Jack McElroy (footballer) =

Australian rules footballer, born 1913

Personal information
- Full name: John Edward McElroy
- Born: 24 March 1913; Warracknabeal, Victoria
- Died: 26 July 1958 (aged 45); Essendon, Victoria
- Original team: Brunswick
- Height: 183 cm (6 ft 0 in)
- Weight: 81.5 kg (180 lb)

Playing career^{1}
| Years | Club | Games (Goals) |
| 1935–37 | Brunswick (VFA) | 49 (76) |
| 1938–39 | Carlton | 17 (12) |
| 1940–41 | Brunswick (VFA) | 37 (79) |
- ^{1} Playing statistics correct to the end of 1939.

John Edward McElroy (24 March 1913 – 26 July 1958) was an Australian rules footballer who played with Carlton in the Victorian Football League (VFL) and Brunswick in the Victorian Football Association (VFA).

== Family ==
The son of John Edward McElroy (1872–1937), and Sarah Jane McElroy (1890–1919), née Dunne, John Edward McElroy was born at Warracknabeal on 24 March 1913.

He married Alma Mary Harrison (1916–2001) on 27 March 1937.

== Death ==
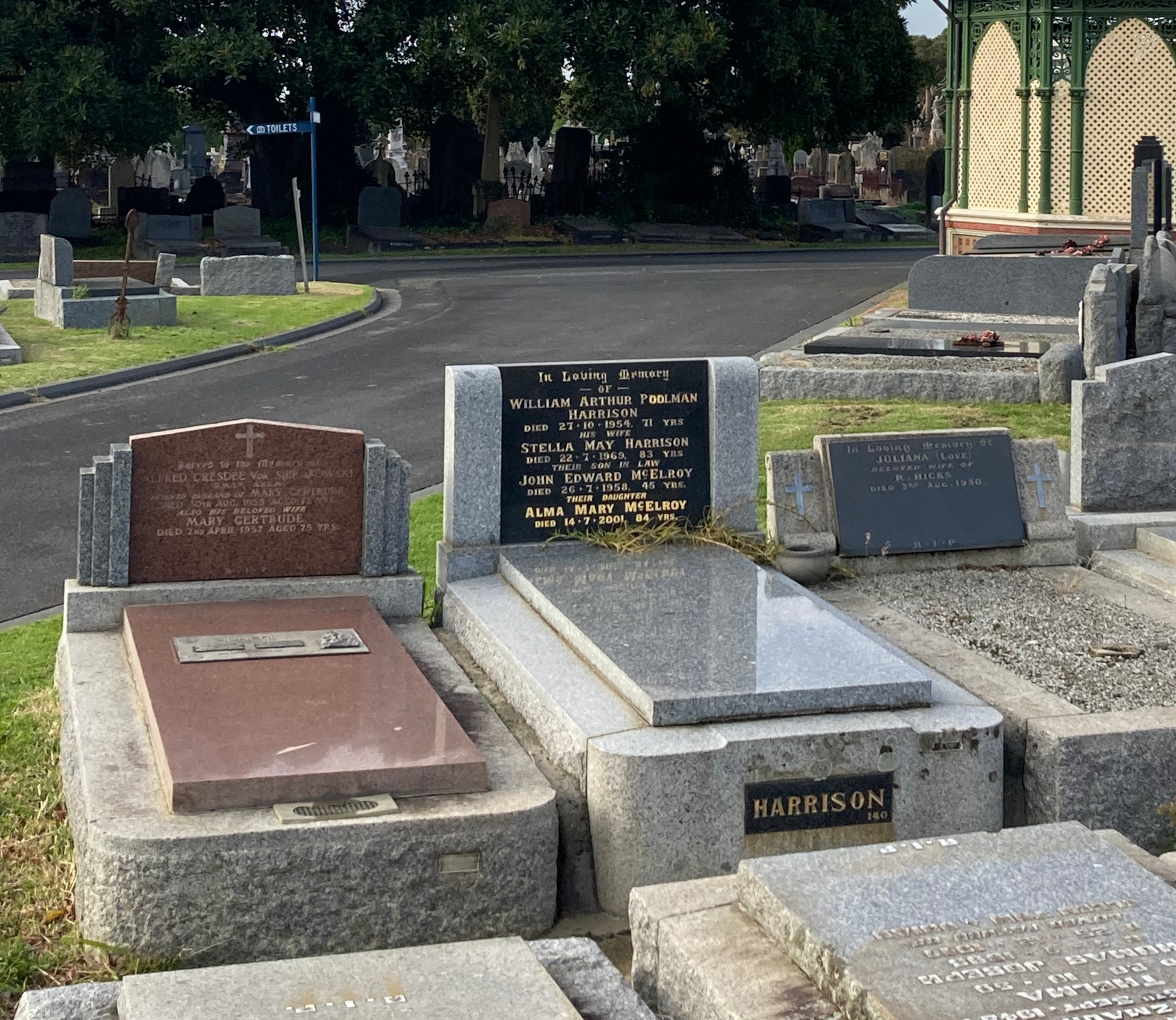
McElroy's grave at Melbourne General Cemetery

He died at Essendon, Victoria on 26 July 1958. He was buried at Melbourne General Cemetery.
