= Autoline Detroit =

- Genre: Automotive
- Starring: John McElroy
- Country of origin: United States
- Original language: English
- No. of seasons: 12 (ongoing)

Production
- Running time: 22 minutes
- Production companies: Blue Sky Productions; Detroit Public Television

Original release
- Network: Syndication (2008-present); Speed Channel (1997-2008)
- Release: 1997 – present

Autoline Detroit is a weekly television show about the global automotive industry. Extra content that did not fit into the television broadcast are also found in the show's website.

== Autoline in LA ==
Autoline in LA was a special series produced by Blue Sky Productions. where John McElroy explores the automobile industry in Los Angeles. The series covers episodes 1218–1228. The conclusion of this series also marked the end of Autoline Detroit's broadcast on Speed Channel.

== Autoline on Autoblog with John McElroy ==
John McElroy also posted articles in Autoblog under the Autoline name.

== Autoline After Hours ==
McElroy currently hosts a weekly live online and uncensored forum every Thursday night with Gary Vasilash, and various guest commentators.

== RoundAbout Show ==
The RoundAbout Show was a weekly podcast affiliated with Autoline Detroit. It was hosted and recorded in the Livonia, Michigan studio. This podcast used to put a quirky twist on all automotive news and features unique segments such as the "Blind Spot story of the week" and "RoundAbout Rearview."

The last episode (number 145, title "This Was RoundAbout") aired October 9, 2012.

== OpenLine ==
OpenLine is a monthly call-in show hosted by Michelle Naranjo and Chelsea Sexton who lead discussions about current automotive news.
