= Union City, Tennessee =

- City
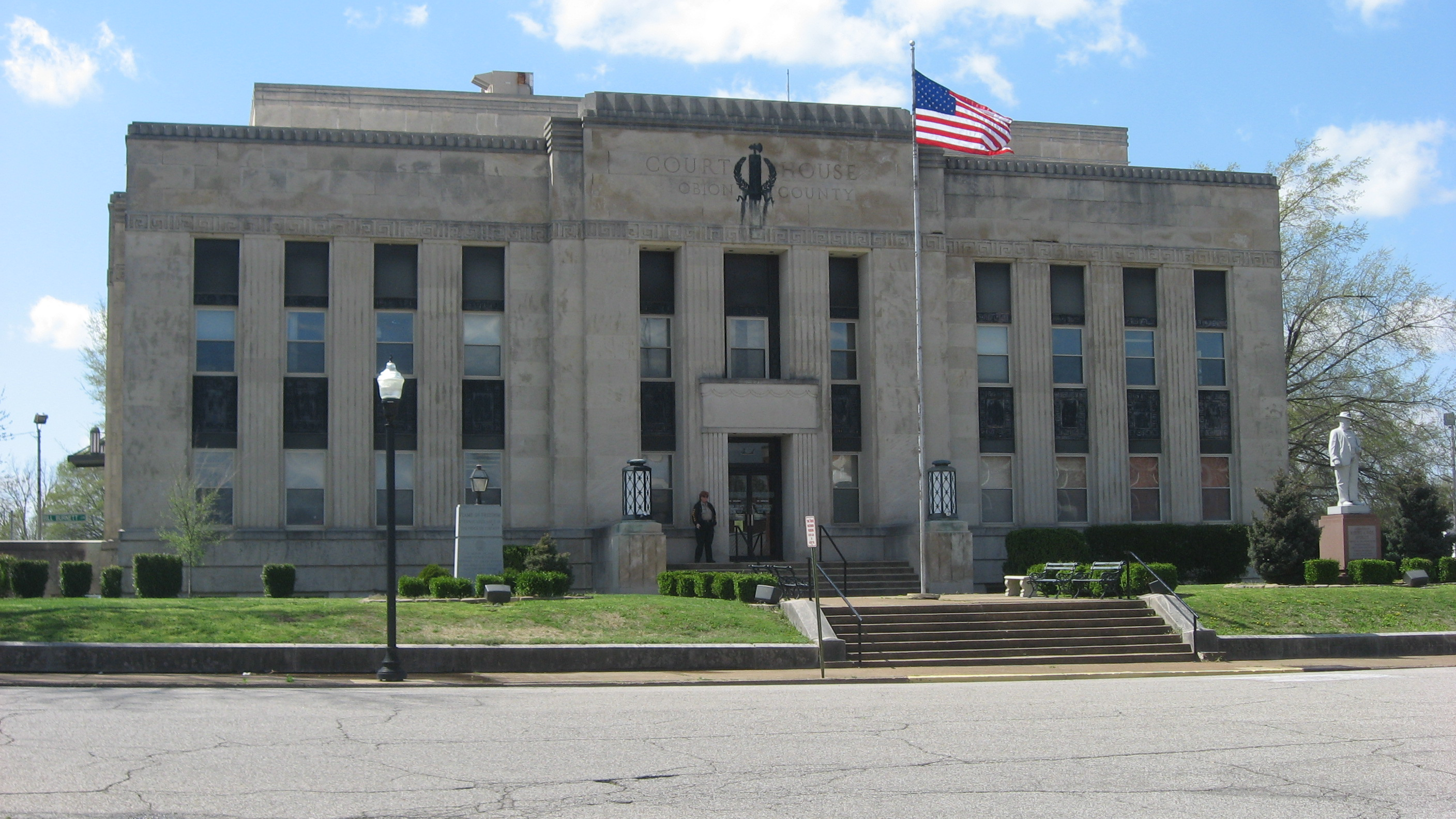
- Obion County Courthouse

- Flag Logo
- Nickname: UC
- Location of Union City in Obion County, Tennessee.
- Coordinates: 36°25′28″N 89°3′3″W
- Country: United States
- State: Tennessee
- County: Obion
- Established: 1854
- Incorporated: 1867
- Named for: Local railroad junction

Government
  - Mayor: Terry Hailey

Area
  - Total: 12.12 sq mi (31.38 km^{2})
  - Land: 12.11 sq mi (31.36 km^{2})
  - Water: 0.0077 sq mi (0.02 km^{2})
- Elevation: 338 ft (103 m)

Population (2020)
  - Total: 11,170
  - Density: 922.5/sq mi (356.18/km^{2})
- Time zone: UTC-6 (Central (CST))
  - Summer (DST): UTC-5 (CDT)
- ZIP codes: 38261 & 38281
- Area code: 731
- FIPS code: 47-75940
- GNIS feature ID: 1273213
- Website: www.unioncitytn.gov

Union City is a city in and the county seat of Obion County, Tennessee, United States. 11,170 people were living in the town as of the 2020 census. It is the principal urban settlement of the surrounding micropolitan area, which includes Obion County and Fulton County, Kentucky. Union City is home to Discovery Park of America which is a museum with many exhibits pertaining to local history, as well as state, national, and world history, science, technology, and art.

== Etymology ==
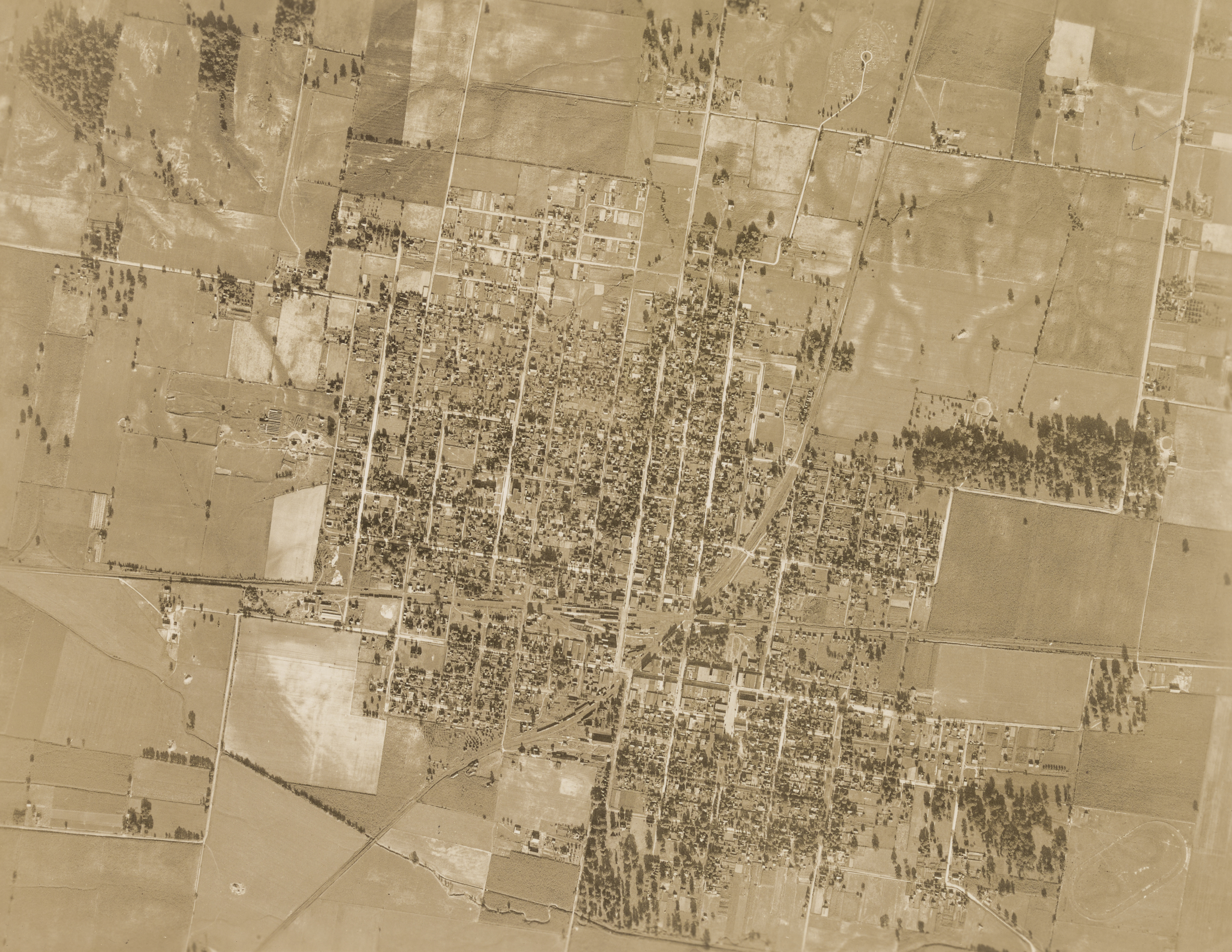
Union City in 1922

In 1852, General George Gibbs gave Union City its name because of its location at the junction or "union" of two railroads, the Nashville/Northwestern Railroad (Hickman, KY) and the Mobile, Alabama/Ohio Railroad.

== Geography ==
Union City is located at 36°25′28″N 89°3′3″W (36.424395, −89.050850). According to the United States Census Bureau, the city has a total area of 10.7 square miles (28 km^{2}), all land. The mayor, appointed by his fellow city councilors since 1988, is Terry Hailey.

=== Climate ===
Under the Köppen climate classification system, Union City has a humid subtropical climate (Köppen Cfa).

Climate data for Union City, Tennessee (1991–2020 normals, extremes 1895–present)
Month	Jan	Feb	Mar	Apr	May	Jun	Jul	Aug	Sep	Oct	Nov	Dec	Year
Record high °F (°C)	78 (26)	81 (27)	91 (33)	93 (34)	100 (38)	106 (41)	109 (43)	111 (44)	108 (42)	99 (37)	86 (30)	78 (26)	111 (44)
Mean daily maximum °F (°C)	44.5 (6.9)	49.2 (9.6)	58.6 (14.8)	69.3 (20.7)	78.1 (25.6)	85.9 (29.9)	88.4 (31.3)	88.0 (31.1)	82.5 (28.1)	71.8 (22.1)	58.5 (14.7)	48.0 (8.9)	68.6 (20.3)
Daily mean °F (°C)	35.7 (2.1)	39.4 (4.1)	48.0 (8.9)	57.9 (14.4)	67.7 (19.8)	75.8 (24.3)	78.5 (25.8)	76.9 (24.9)	70.3 (21.3)	58.9 (14.9)	47.4 (8.6)	39.0 (3.9)	58.0 (14.4)
Mean daily minimum °F (°C)	26.9 (−2.8)	29.6 (−1.3)	37.4 (3.0)	46.5 (8.1)	57.3 (14.1)	65.7 (18.7)	68.6 (20.3)	65.8 (18.8)	58.1 (14.5)	46.0 (7.8)	36.3 (2.4)	30.0 (−1.1)	47.4 (8.6)
Record low °F (°C)	−22 (−30)	−19 (−28)	−7 (−22)	22 (−6)	32 (0)	43 (6)	45 (7)	44 (7)	33 (1)	15 (−9)	1 (−17)	−13 (−25)	−22 (−30)
Average precipitation inches (mm)	3.97 (101)	4.64 (118)	5.23 (133)	5.22 (133)	5.56 (141)	4.41 (112)	4.05 (103)	3.34 (85)	3.81 (97)	3.96 (101)	4.43 (113)	5.17 (131)	53.79 (1,366)
Average snowfall inches (cm)	2.1 (5.3)	1.7 (4.3)	1.0 (2.5)	0.0 (0.0)	0.0 (0.0)	0.0 (0.0)	0.0 (0.0)	0.0 (0.0)	0.0 (0.0)	0.1 (0.25)	0.2 (0.51)	0.7 (1.8)	5.8 (15)
Average precipitation days (≥ 0.01 in)	12.1	10.7	12.7	11.9	12.2	9.9	9.0	8.2	7.6	8.4	10.4	11.3	124.4
Average snowy days (≥ 0.1 in)	1.6	1.1	0.4	0.0	0.0	0.0	0.0	0.0	0.0	0.0	0.2	0.6	3.9
Source: NOAA

== Demographics ==
Historical population
Census	Pop.	Note	%±
1880	1,879		—
1890	3,441		83.1%
1900	3,407		−1.0%
1910	4,389		28.8%
1920	4,412		0.5%
1930	5,865		32.9%
1940	7,256		23.7%
1950	7,665		5.6%
1960	8,837		15.3%
1970	11,925		34.9%
1980	10,436		−12.5%
1990	10,513		0.7%
2000	10,876		3.5%
2010	10,895		0.2%
2020	11,170		2.5%

=== 2020 census ===
As of the 2020 census, there were 11,170 people, 4,656 households, and 2,617 families residing in Union City. 94.9% of residents lived in urban areas, while 5.1% lived in rural areas.

The median age was 39.0 years, with 24.6% of residents under the age of 18 and 18.9% aged 65 or older. For every 100 females, there were 86.9 males, and for every 100 females age 18 and over there were 84.9 males.

Of the 4,656 households, 30.8% had children under the age of 18 living in them. Of all households, 35.9% were married-couple households, 18.7% were households with a male householder and no spouse or partner present, and 38.6% were households with a female householder and no spouse or partner present. About 34.3% of all households were made up of individuals and 14.8% had someone living alone who was 65 years of age or older.

There were 5,107 housing units, of which 8.8% were vacant. The homeowner vacancy rate was 1.7% and the rental vacancy rate was 7.0%.

Racial composition as of the 2020 census
Race	Number	Percent
White	7,148	64.0%
Black or African American	2,491	22.3%
American Indian and Alaska Native	37	0.3%
Asian	65	0.6%
Native Hawaiian and Other Pacific Islander	0	0.0%
Some other race	592	5.3%
Two or more races	837	7.5%
Hispanic or Latino (of any race)	1,014	9.1%

=== 2000 census ===
As of the census of 2000, the population density was 1,020.1 inhabitants per square mile (393.9/km^{2}). There were 5,013 housing units at an average density of 470.2 per square mile (181.5/km^{2}). The racial makeup of the city was 75.44% White, 21.29% African American, 0.22% Native American, 0.29% Asian, 0.13% Pacific Islander, 1.59% from other races, and 1.04% from two or more races. Hispanic or Latino of any race were 3.41% of the population.

There were 4,568 households, out of which 29.7% had children under the age of 18 living with them, 44.6% were married couples living together, 15.1% had a female householder with no husband present, and 36.4% were non-families. 32.7% of all households were made up of individuals, and 15.1% had someone living alone who was 65 years of age or older. The average household size was 2.30 and the average family size was 2.89.

In the city, the population was spread out, with 23.6% under the age of 18, 9.6% from 18 to 24, 26.8% from 25 to 44, 22.6% from 45 to 64, and 17.5% who were 65 years of age or older. The median age was 38 years. For every hundred females there were 87.6 males. For every 100 females age 18 and over, there were 81.4 males.

The median income for a household in the city was $29,399, and the median income for a family was $40,737. Males had a median income of $35,801 versus $19,694 for females. The per capita income for the city was $18,787. About 12.5% of families and 16.8% of the population were below the poverty line, including 26.4% of those under age 18 and 14.6% of those age 65 or over.

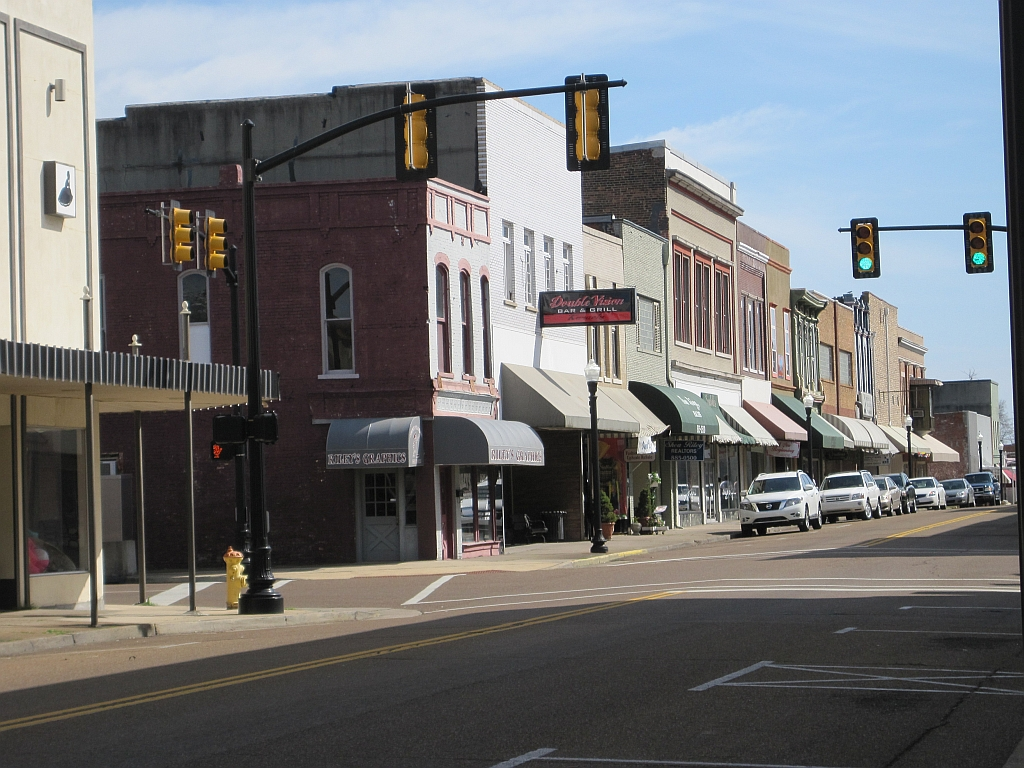
A main street in Union City.

== Economy ==
The Goodyear Tire & Rubber Company operated a plant in the city from 1969 to 2011. On February 10, 2011, Goodyear announced that the Union City plant would shut down by the end of the year. On June 11, 2011, production ceased at the plant. In November 2011, Titan Tire purchased the plant from Goodyear four months after the latter closed it. It initially will be used for mixing raw materials for other Titan production facilities.

Freight rail service was previously provided by the Illinois Central (IC) and then Canadian National (CN) via a branch line between Rives and Union City. On May 24, 2017, CN transferred operations of the line to the Indiana Business Railroad, which operates the Union City Terminal Railroad.

Darling International operates a rendering plant.

== Cultural ==
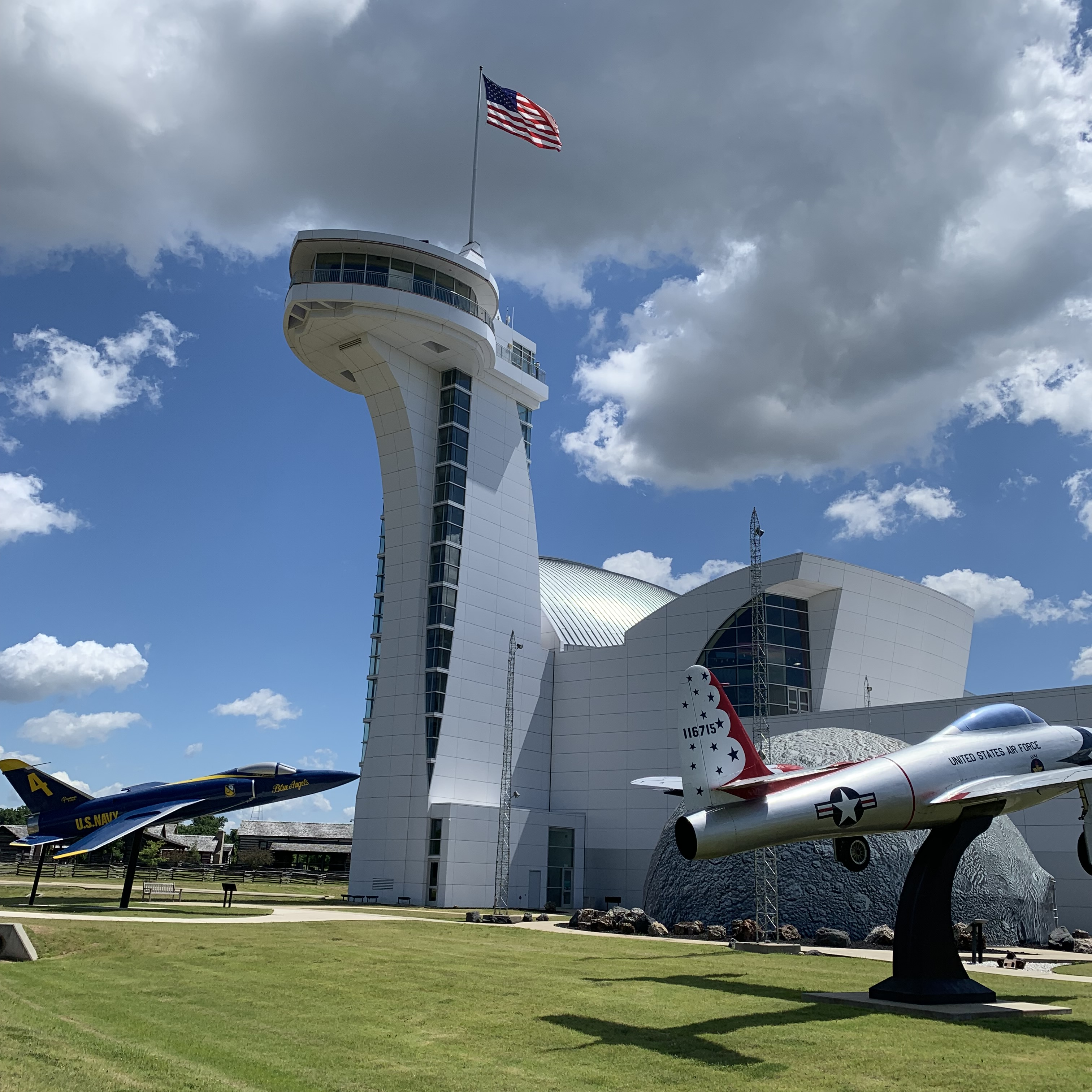
Discovery Park of America in Union City, TN.

=== Museums ===
Union City is home to Discovery Park of America, a 50-acre museum and heritage park with exhibits pertaining to local and national history, nature, military history, art and science. Discovery Park was founded by local businessman Robert Kirkland in order to give back to his home community.

=== Sports ===
Union City was home to a Minor League Baseball team known as the Union City Greyhounds from 1935 to 1942 and 1946 to 1952 and as the Union City Dodgers from 1953 to 1955. They played in the Kentucky–Illinois–Tennessee League and won three league championships (1936, 1948, and 1954). Over their 19-year run, the team had affiliations with the St. Louis Cardinals, Cincinnati Reds, Cleveland Indians, and Brooklyn Dodgers.

=== Media ===
Union City is served by the newspaper The Messenger (Union City Daily Messenger).

Union City is in the southernmost portion of the Paducah–Cape Girardeau–Harrisburg television market. Locally based Low-Power Class A television station WUWT-CD (channel 26) is licensed to Union City and serves Union City, Obion County, and immediate surrounding areas with programming from Retro TV, with programming from The Family Channel airing on its second digital subchannel. The main television broadcast stations serving extreme northwest Tennessee are:

- WSIL-TV 3 Harrisburg (ABC)
- WPSD-TV 6 Paducah (NBC)
- WLJT 11 Lexington, TN (PBS)
- KFVS-TV 12 Cape Girardeau (CBS)
  - KFVS-TV 12.2 Cape Girardeau (The CW)
- KBSI 23 Cape Girardeau (Fox)
- WUWT-CD 26 Union City (RTV)
- WKPD 29 Paducah (PBS)
- WDKA 49 Paducah (MNTV)

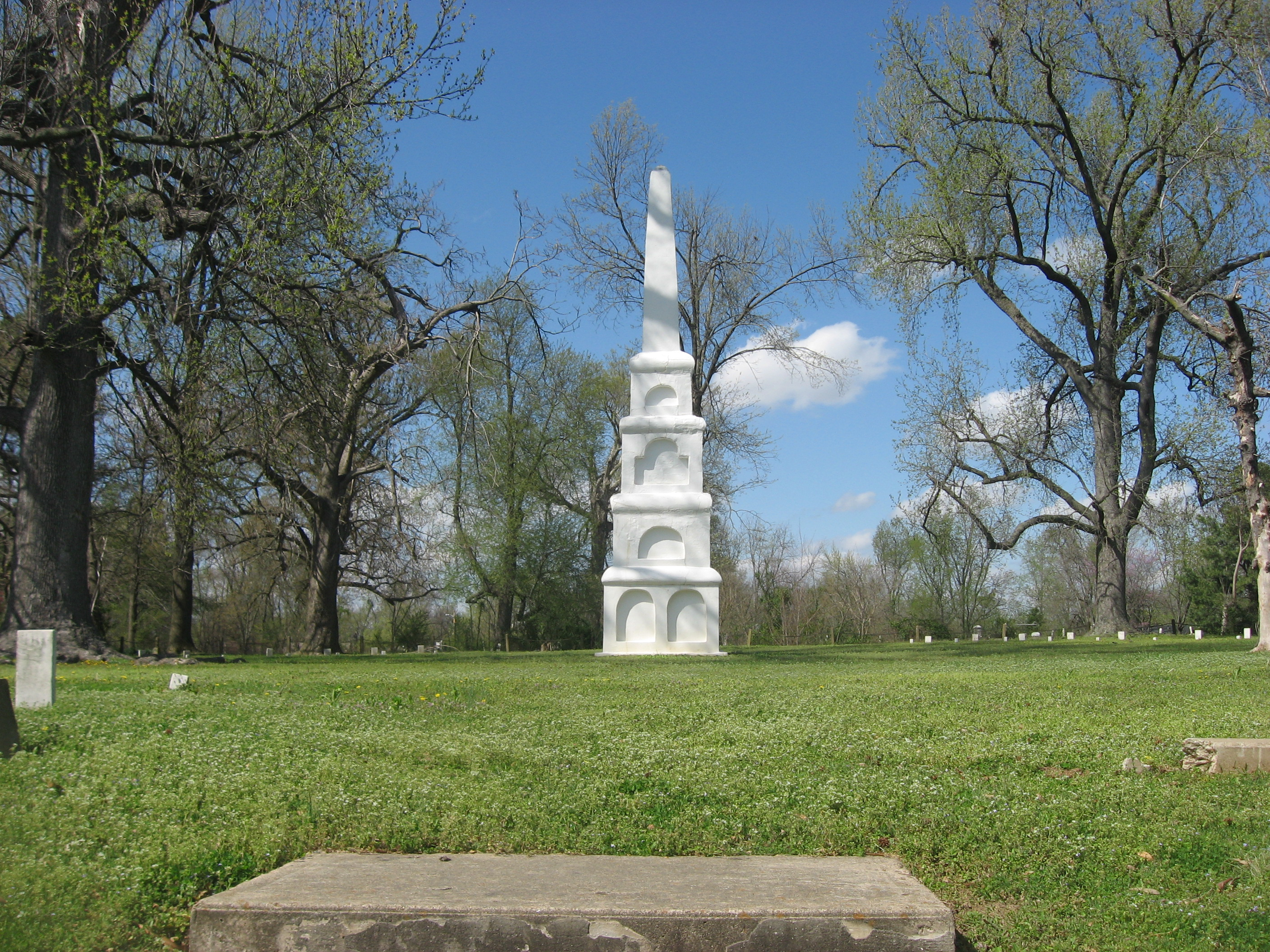
Confederate Monument

=== Historic landmarks ===
- Masquerade Theatre - located in the former Capital Theater on South First Street. The theatre is a historic landmark and has been standing since the early 1900s.
- Confederate Monument

== Education ==
Almost all of the city limits is in the Union City Schools, which includes Union City High School. Very small portions extend into the Obion County Schools.

== Notable people ==
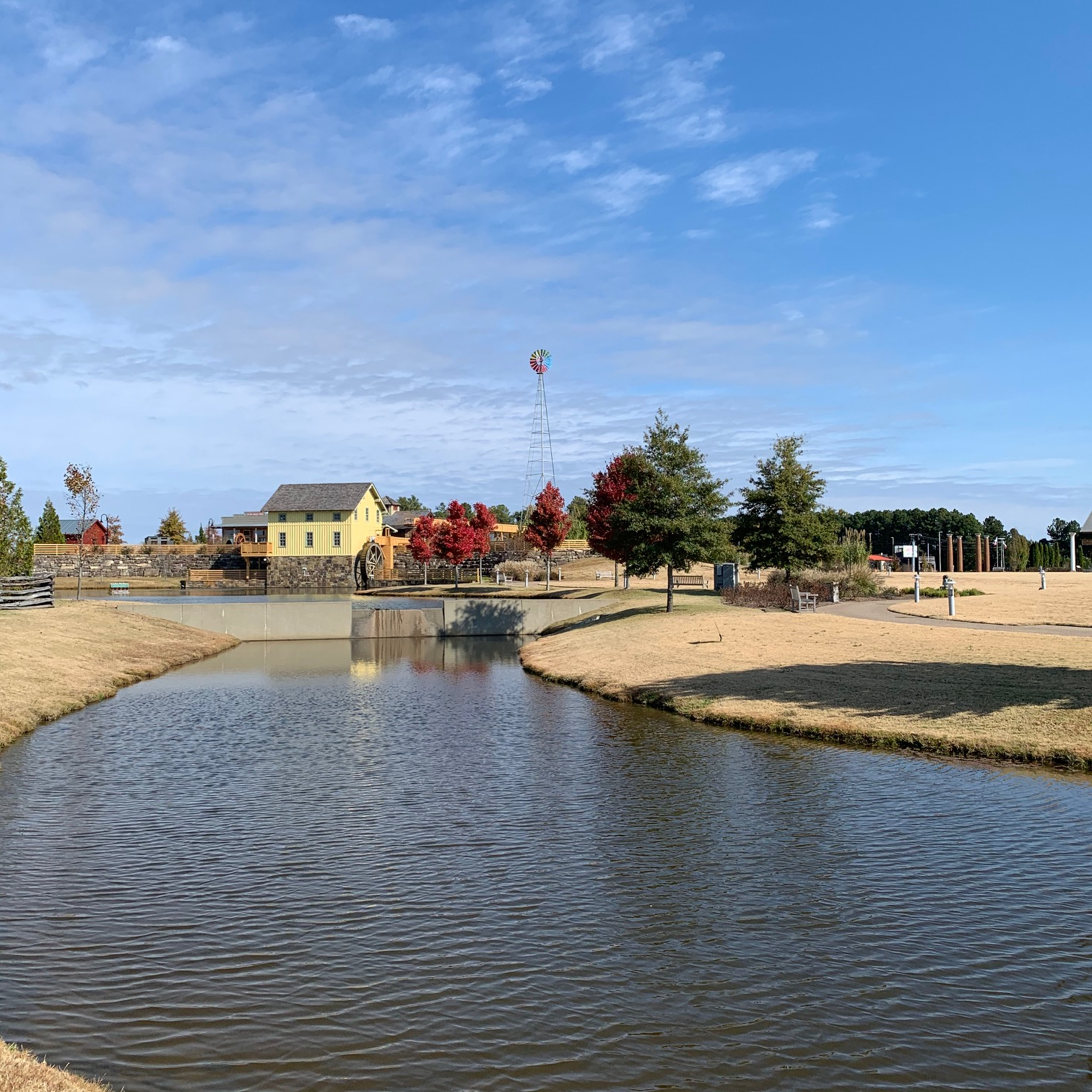
Discovery Park of America in Union City

- Russell Dickerson – country music singer
- Steve Finley – MLB outfielder, World Series champion with Arizona Diamondbacks
- Bruce Fleisher (1948–2021) – professional golfer
- Milton H. Hamilton Jr. – served in the Tennessee General Assembly; was majority leader of the Tennessee State Senate
- Andrieus A. Jones – US Senator of New Mexico 1917–1927, born in Union City
- Jovante Moffatt – NFL Player
- Jon Robinson – General Manager, Tennessee Titans
- Derrick Turnbow – MLB pitcher
- Koko B. Ware – professional wrestler
- Zach Underwood – professional fighter
